= List of Dutch painters =

This is a list of Dutch painters who were born and/or were primarily active in the Netherlands. For artists born and active in the Southern Netherlands, see the List of Flemish painters. The artists are sorted by century and then alphabetically by last name. In general, artists are included that are mentioned at the ArtCyclopedia website, in the Grove Dictionary of Art, and/or whose paintings regularly sell for over $20,000 at auctions. Active painters are therefore underrepresented, while more than half of the artists are baroque painters of the 17th century, roughly corresponding to the Dutch Golden Age. The names of older artists often have many different spellings; the preferred spelling is used as listed in the Netherlands Institute for Art History database, but several painters are listed twice when their common alternative names are alphabetically far apart.

== 14th and 15th century ==
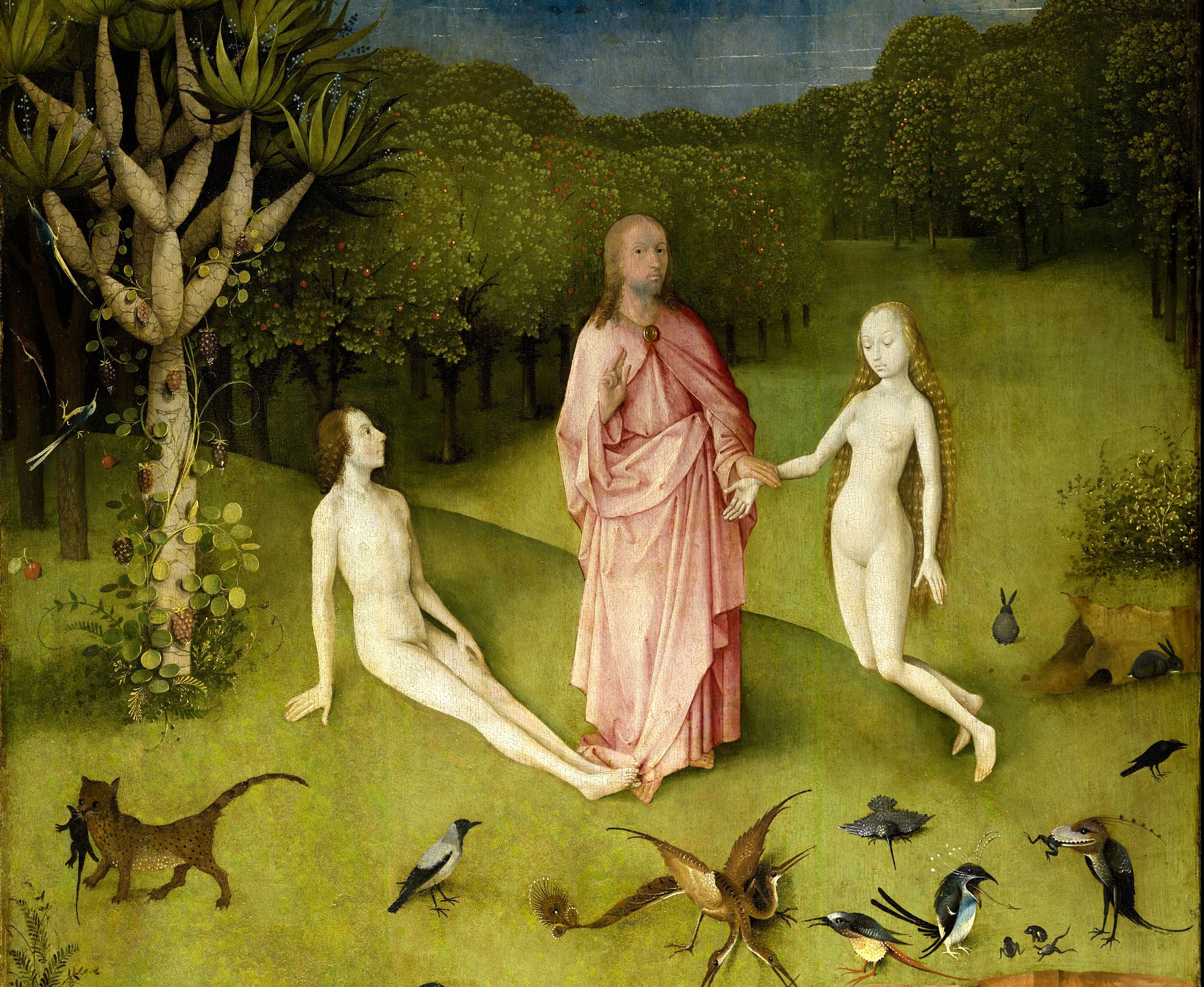
Jeroen Bosch, c. 1490

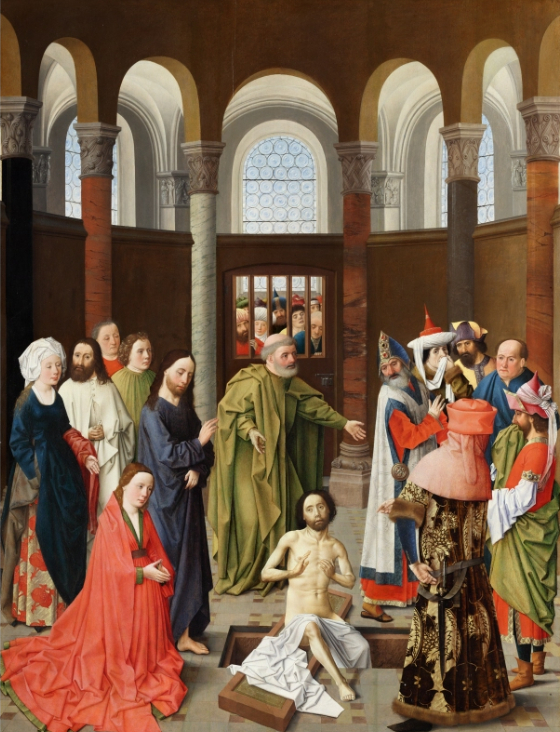
Albert van Ouwater, c. 1450

- Bosch, Hieronymus ('s-Hertogenbosch 1450 – 's-Hertogenbosch 1516)
- Bouts, Dieric (Haarlem 1415 – Leuven 1475)
- Christus, Petrus (Baarle 1415/1435 – Bruges 1476)
- David, Gerard (Oudewater 1460 – Bruges 1523)
- Engelbrechtsz, Cornelis (Gouda c. 1462 – Leiden 1527)
- Geertgen tot Sint Jans (Leiden? c. 1460 – Haarlem c.1495)
- Joest van Calcar, Jan (Kalkar c. 1450 – Haarlem 1519)
- Limbourg brothers (Nijmegen 1380/1390 – Dijon? 1416)
- Maelwael, Jan (Nijmegen c. 1365 – Dijon 1415)
- Master of Alkmaar (active 1475–1515 in Alkmaar)
- Master of Bellaert (active 1483–86 in Haarlem)
- Master of Delft (fl. 1490–1520 in Delft)
- Master of the Amsterdam Death of the Virgin (fl. 1485 – 1510 in Amsterdam or Utrecht)
- Master of the Brunswick Diptych (fl. 1485 – 1510 in Haarlem?)
- Master of the Figdor Deposition (fl. 1480 – 1500 in Haarlem)
- Master of the Saint Bartholomew Altarpiece (Nijmegen? c. 1450 – Cologne 1510)
- Master of the Tiburtine Sibyl (fl. 1470 – 1505 in Haarlem)
- Master of the Virgo inter Virgines (active 1470 – 1505 in Delft)
- Master of Zweder van Culemborg (fl. 1420 – 1440 in Culemborg)
- Mynnesten, Johan van den (Schüttorf 1425 – Zwolle 1504)
- Ouwater, Albert van (Oudewater c. 1410 – Haarlem? >1475)
- Reuwich, Erhard (Utrecht c. 1455 – Mainz c. 1490)
- Vrelant, Willem (Vreeland? <1430 – Bruges c. 1481)

== 16th century ==
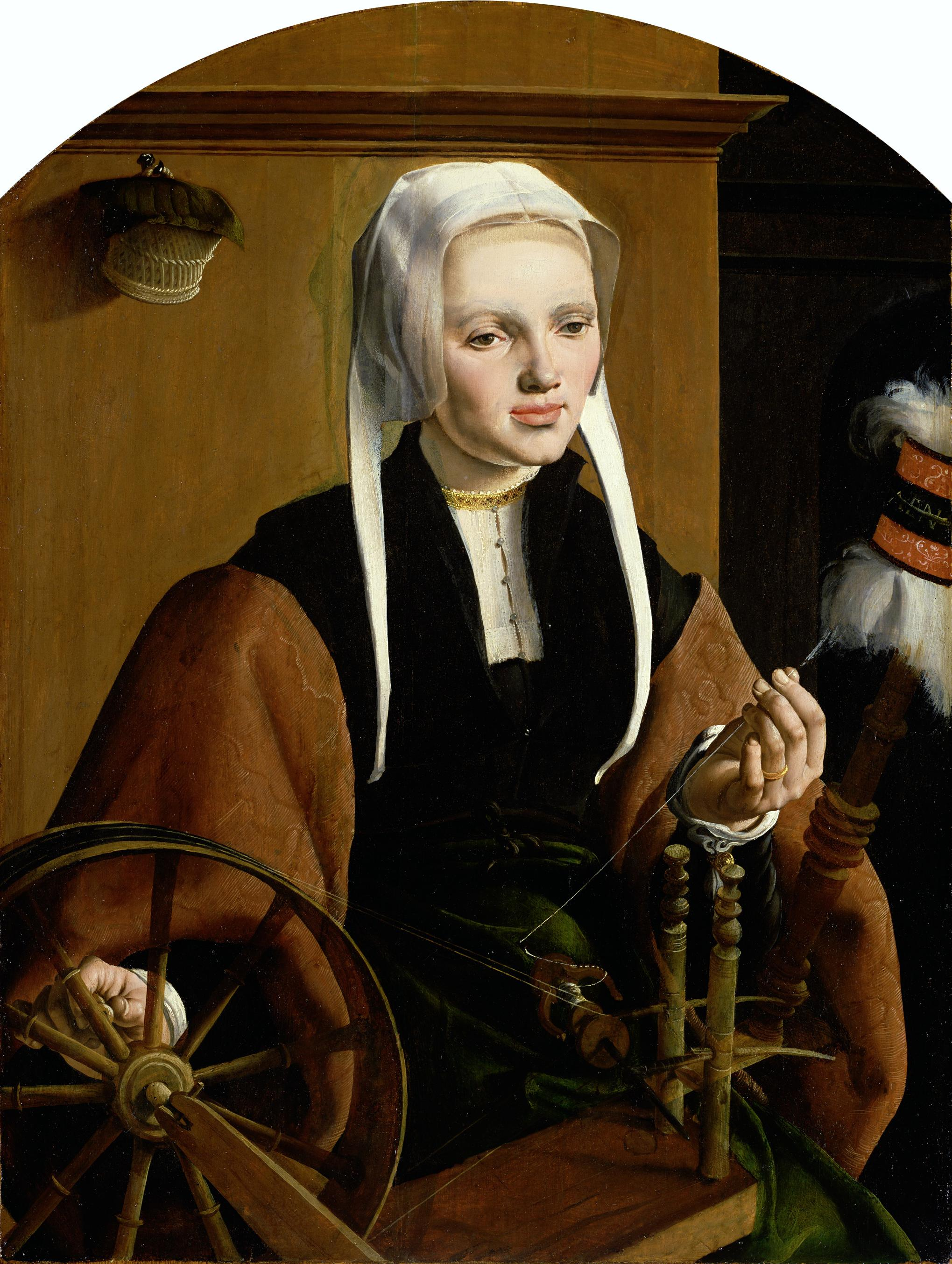
Maarten van Heemskerck, 1529

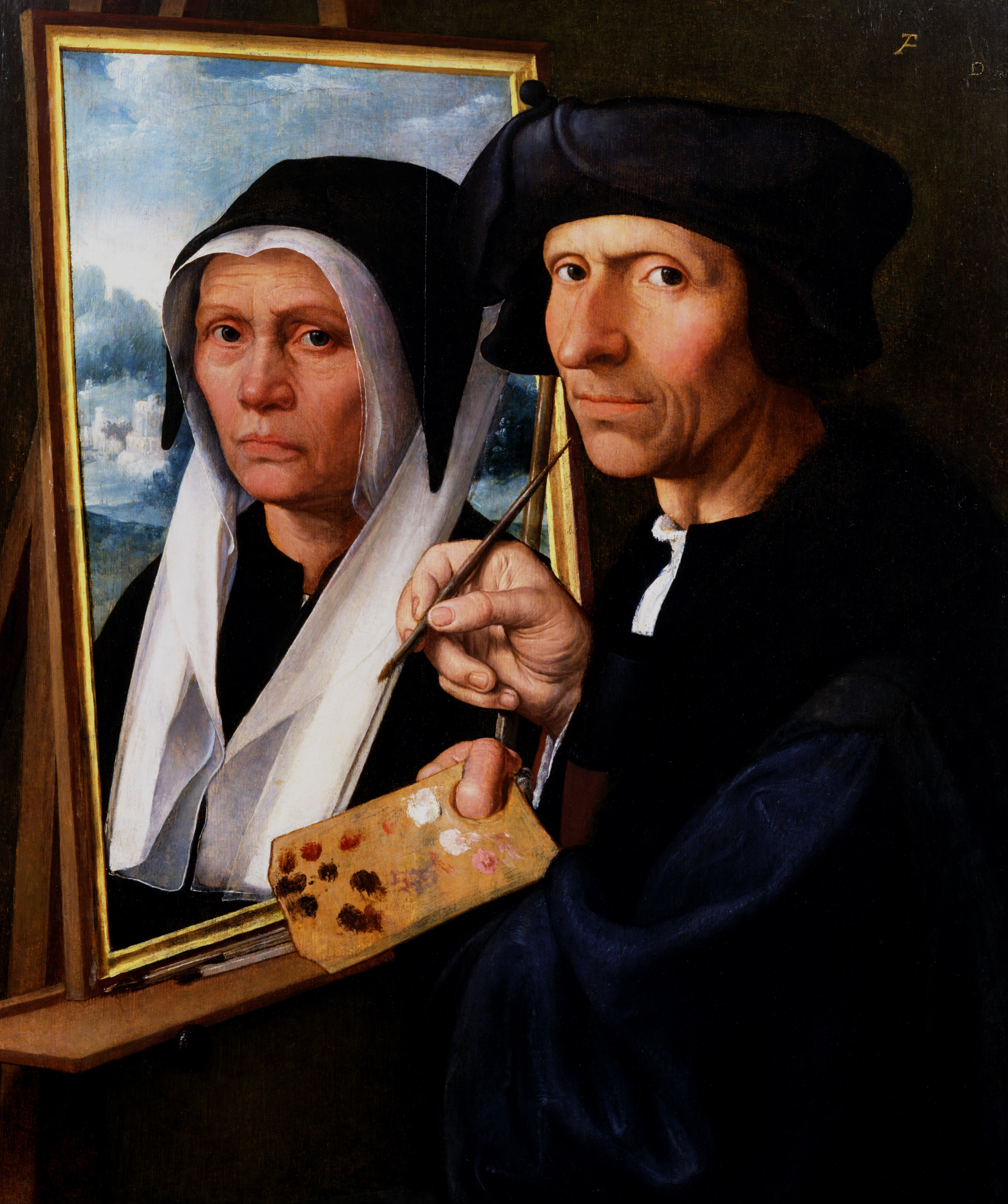
Dirk Jacobsz (van Oostsanen), 1550

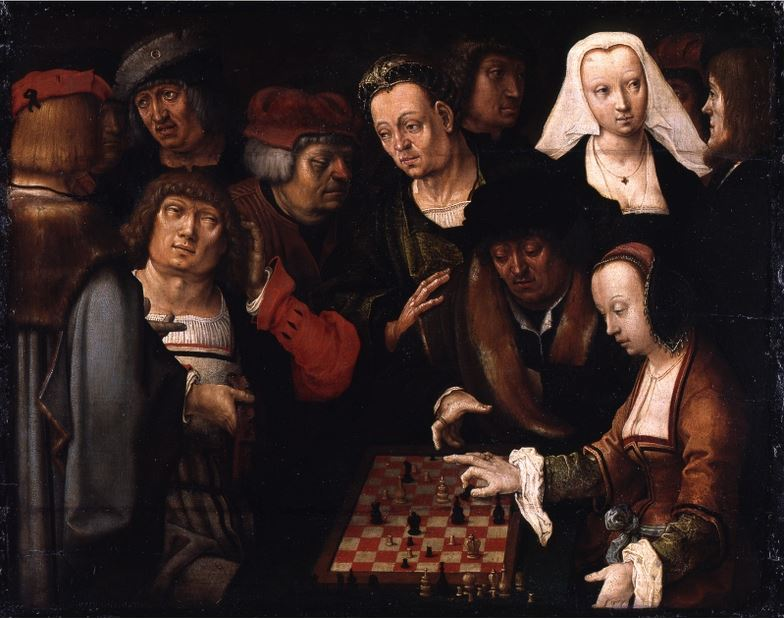
Lucas van Leyden, c.1508

=== A-L ===
- Aertsen, Pieter (Amsterdam 1508 – Amsterdam 1575)
- Aertsz, Rijckaert (Wijk aan Zee 1482 – Antwerp 1577)
- Amstel, Jan van (Amsterdam c. 1500 – Antwerp c. 1542)
- Barendsz, Dirck (Amsterdam 1534 – Amsterdam 1592)
- Beer, Joos de (Utrecht 1515/35 – Utrecht 1593)
- Blocklandt van Montfoort, Anthonie (Montfoort 1533 – Utrecht 1583)
- Cornelia toe Boecop (Kampen, Overijssel, 1551 – Sint-Michielsgestel after 1629)
- Margaretha toe Boecop (Kampen c. 1551 – Kampen after 1574)
- Bruegel the Elder, Pieter (Breda? 1525 – Brussels 1569)
- Cock, Jan Wellens de (Leiden? c. 1470 – Antwerp 1527)
- Coninxloo, Gillis van (Antwerp 1544 – Amsterdam 1607)
- Crabeth, Adriaen Pietersz (Gouda c. 1510 – Autun 1553)
- Crabeth, Dirk (Gouda 1501 – Gouda 1574)
- Crabeth, Wouter, I (Gouda c. 1510 – Gouda 1590)
- Cronenburg, Adriaen van (Schagen 1535/45 – Bergum c. 1604)
- Dalem, Cornelis van (Antwerp c. 1530 – Breda 1573)
- Delff, Jacob Willemsz (Gouda c. 1550 – Delft 1601)
- Dircksz, Barend (Amsterdam 1490/1510 – Amsterdam 1577)
- Elaut, Franchoys (Haarlem ca. 1589 – Haarlem 1635)
- Elburcht, Jan van der (Elburg ca. 1500 – Antwerp 1571)
- Goltzius, Hendrick (Mulbracht 1558 – Haarlem 1617)
- Gossaert, Jan (Maubeuge 1478 – Middelburg 1532)
- Haye, Corneille de la (The Hague 1505 – Lyon 1575)
- Heemskerck, Maarten van (Heemskerk 1498 – Haarlem 1574)
- Hoey, Jan de (Leiden 1544 – Avon, Seine-et-Marne 1615)
- Isenbrandt, Adriaen (Haarlem? c. 1485 – Bruges 1551)
- Jacobsz, Dirck (Amsterdam? bef. 1497 – Amsterdam 1567)
- Ketel, Cornelis (Gouda 1548 – Amsterdam 1616)
- Key, Willem (Breda 1515 – Antwerp 1568)
- Kraeck, Jan (Haarlem 1538 – Turin 1607)
- Kunst, Pieter Cornelisz (Leiden 1484 – Leiden 1561)
- Leyden, Aertgen Claesz van (Leiden 1498 – Leiden 1564)
- Leyden, Lucas van (Leiden 1494 – Leiden 1533)
- Lichtenberg, Mechtelt van (Utrecht? ca. 1520 – (Kampen 1598)
- Lyon, Corneille de (The Hague 1505 – Lyon 1575)

=== M-Z ===
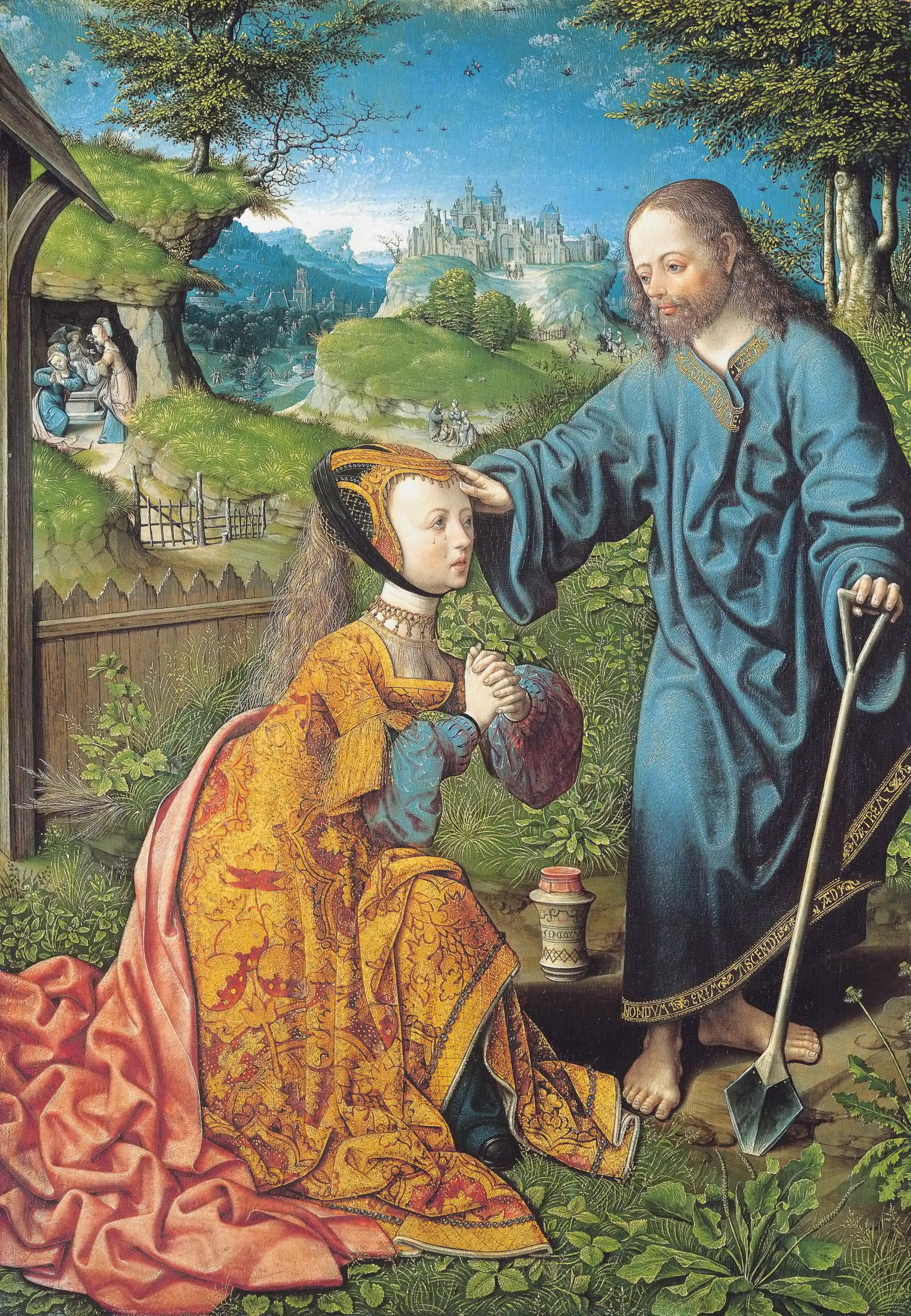
Jacob Cornelisz van Oostsanen, 1507

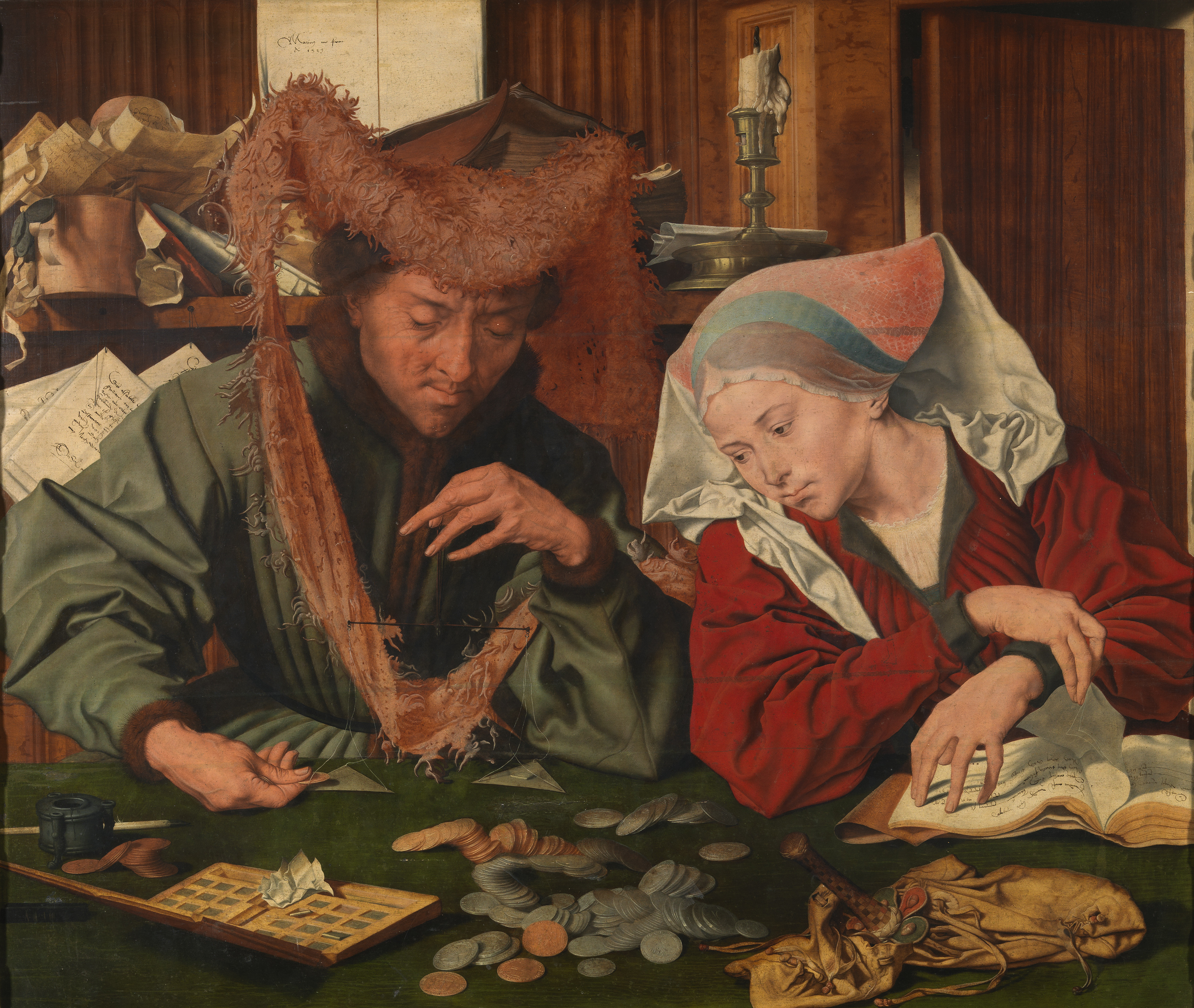
Marinus van Reymerswale, 1539

- Mabuse, Jan Gossaert van (Maubeuge 1478 – Middelburg 1532)
- Mander, Karel van (Meulebeke 1548 – Amsterdam 1606)
- Mandijn, Jan (Haarlem c. 1500 – Antwerp c. 1560)
- Mor, Anthonis (Utrecht 1519 – Antwerp 1575)
- Mostaert, Gillis (Hulst 1528 – Antwerp 1598)
- Mostaert, Jan (Haarlem c. 1475 – Haarlem 1553)
- Nagel, Jan (Haarlem c. 1560 – The Hague 1602)
- Oostsanen, Jacob Cornelisz van (Oostzaan 1472 – Amsterdam 1533)
- Pietersz, Aert (Amsterdam 1550 – Amsterdam 1612)
- Pietersz, Magdalena (Haarlem c. 1550 – Amsterdam aft. 1592)
- Pietersz, Pieter (Antwerp 1541 – Amsterdam 1603)
- Pourbus, Pieter (Gouda 1523 – Bruges 1584)
- Queborn, Daniel van den (Antwerp c. 1555 – The Hague c. 1605)
- Ravesteyn, Dirck de Quade van (The Hague 1565/70 – aft. 1619)
- Reymerswale, Marinus van (Reimerswaal c. 1490 – Goes 1546)
- Saenredam, Jan (Zaandam 1565 – Assendelft 1607)
- Savery, Jacob (Kortrijk c. 1565 – Amsterdam 1603)
- Scorel, Jan van (Schoorl 1495 – Utrecht 1562)
- Jan Soens ('s-Hertogenbosch c. 1547 – Parma 1611)
- Steenwijck, Hendrik I van (Kampen c. 1550 – Frankfurt am Main 1603)
- Sustris, Lambert (Amsterdam c. 1515 – Venice 1591)
- Swanenburg, Isaac Claesz van (Leiden 1537 – Leiden 1614)
- Swart van Groningen, Jan (Groningen c. 1495 – Antwerp? c. 1560)
- Weelink, Gerrit Pietersz (Amsterdam 1566 – Amsterdam 1611/12)
- Thibaut, Willem (Haarlem 1524 – Haarlem 1597)
- Utrecht, Jacob van (Utrecht? c. 1480 – Lübeck? >1530)
- Veen, Otto van (Leiden 1556 – Brussels 1629)
- Vermeyen, Jan Cornelisz (Beverwijk 1504 – Brussels 1559)
- Vredeman de Vries (Leeuwarden 1526 – Hamburg 1609)

== 17th century ==
=== A ===
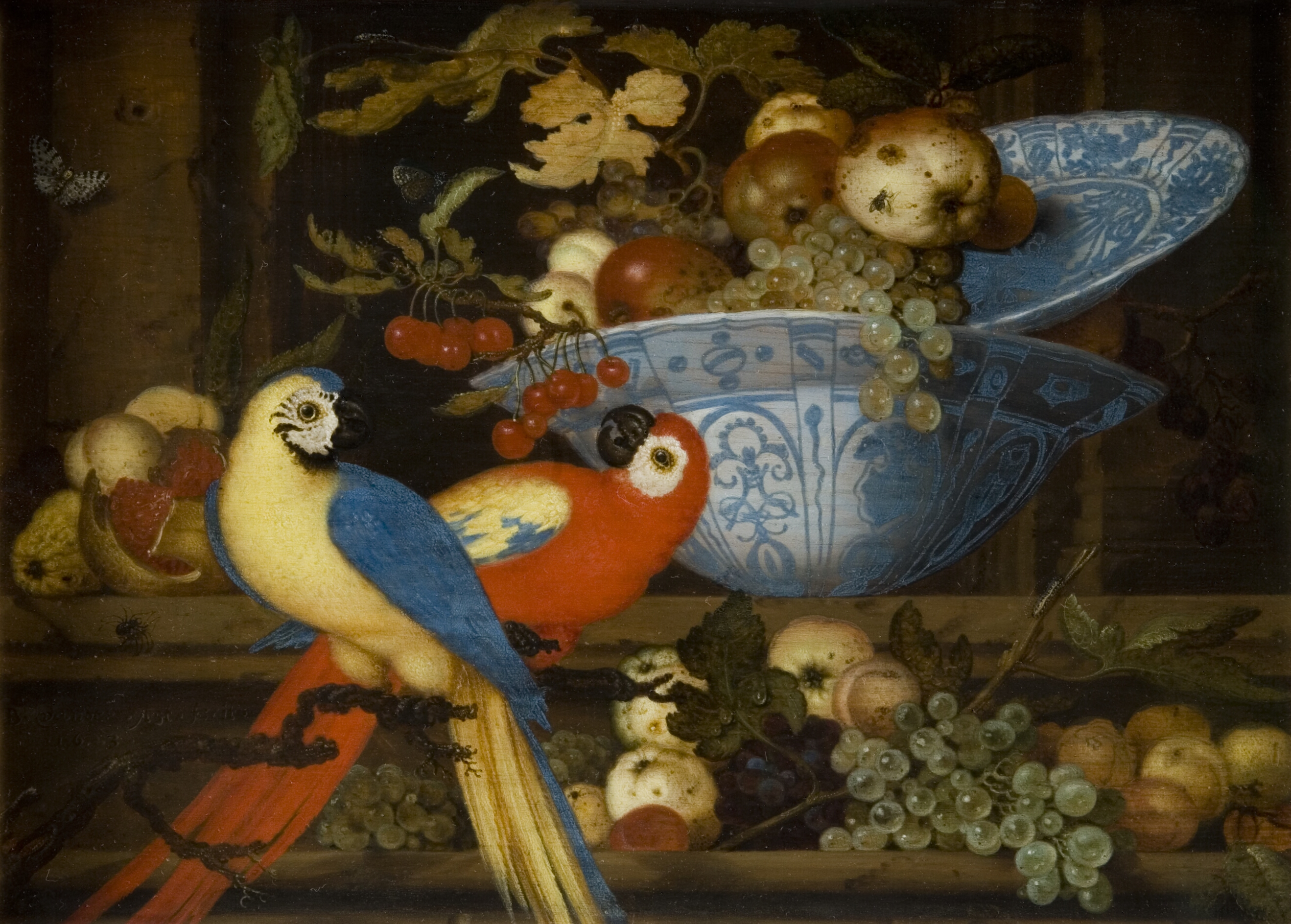
Balthasar van der Ast, 1623

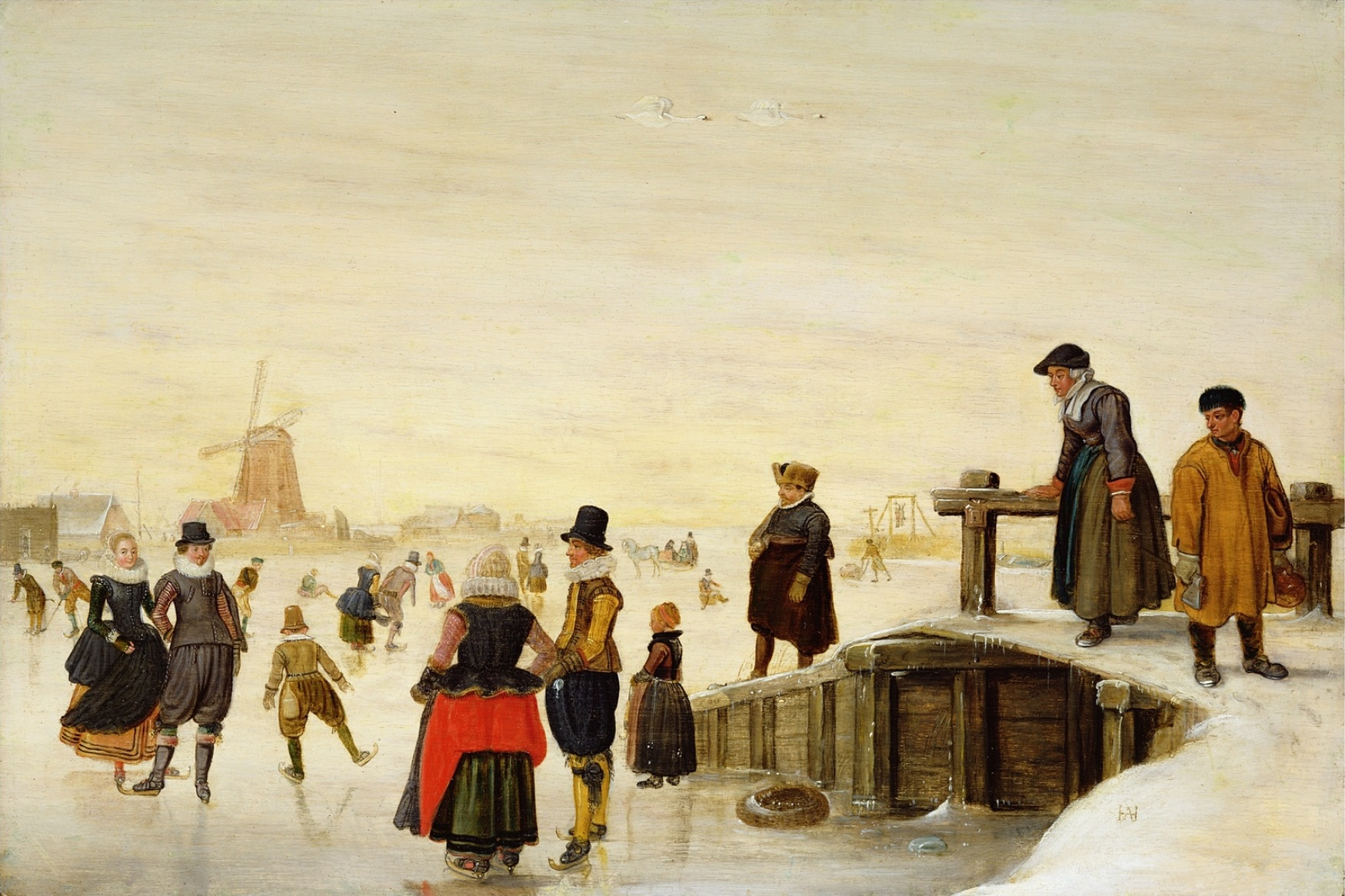
Hendrick Avercamp, c. 1625

- Aeck, Johannes van der (Leiden 1636 – Leiden 1662)
- Aelst, Evert van (Delft 1602 – Delft 1657)
- Aelst, Willem van (Delft 1627 – Amsterdam 1683)
- Aken, Jan van (Amsterdam 1614/15 – Amsterdam 1661)
- Aldewereld, Herman van (Amsterdam 1628/29 – Amsterdam 1669)
- Angel, Philips (I) (Middelburg 1616 – Middelburg aft. 1683)
- Angel, Philips (II) (Leiden c. 1618 – Batavia, Dutch East Indies 1664/65)
- Anraedt, Pieter van (Utrecht c. 1635 – Deventer 1678)
- Anthonissen, Hendrick van (Amsterdam 1605 – Amsterdam 1656)
- Anthonisz, Aert (Antwerp 1579/80 – Amsterdam 1620)
- Arentsz, Arent (Amsterdam)
- Asch, Pieter van (Delft 1603 – Delft 1678)
- Asselijn, Jan (Diemen c. 1610 – Amsterdam 1652)
- Assteyn, Bartholomeus (Dordrecht 1607 – Dordrecht 1670/77)
- Ast, Balthasar van der (Middelburg 1593/94 – Delft 1657)
- Avercamp, Barend (Kampen 1612/13 – Kampen 1679)
- Avercamp, Hendrick (Amsterdam 1585 – Kampen 1634)

=== B ===
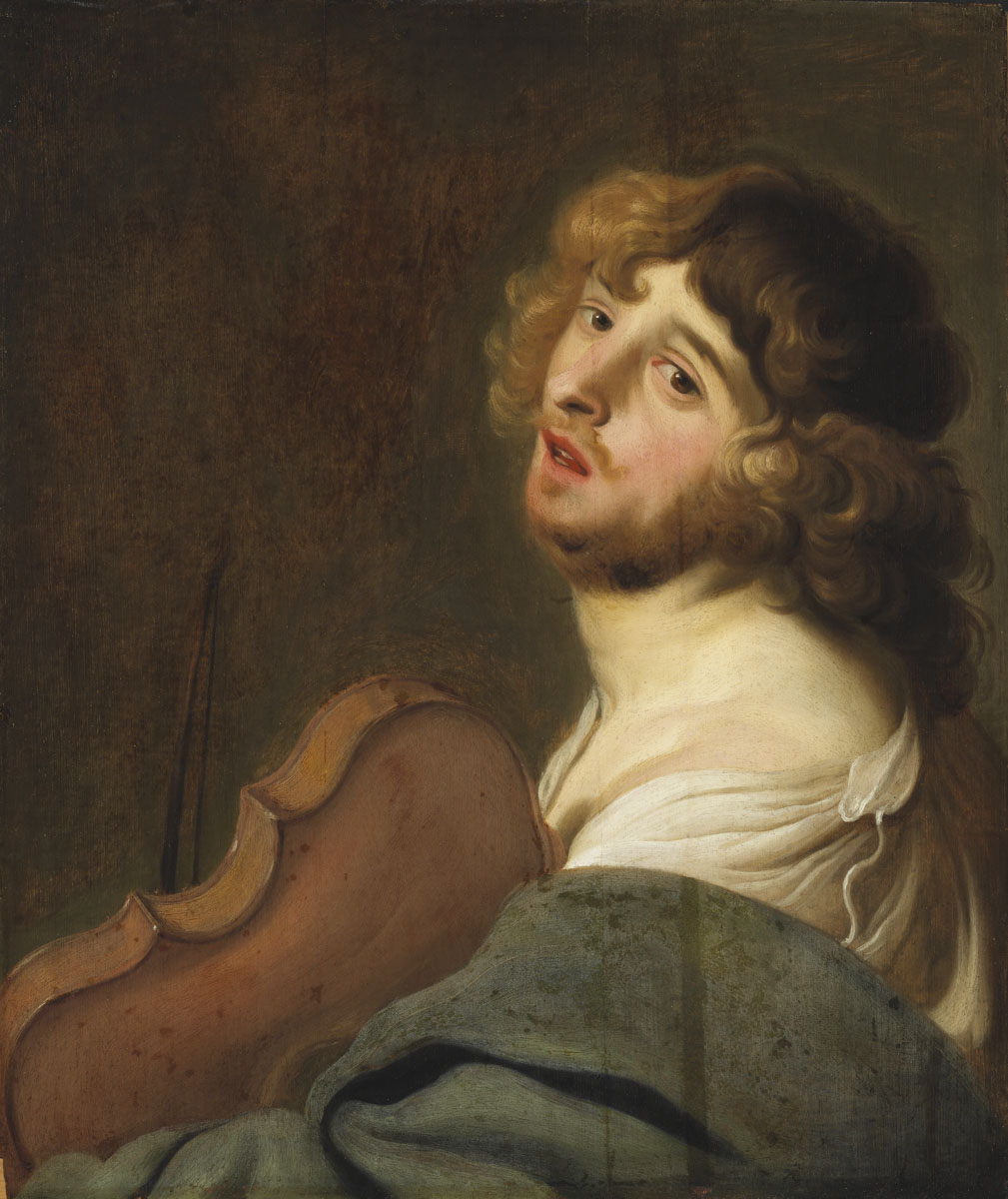
Jacob Adriaensz Backer, 1635

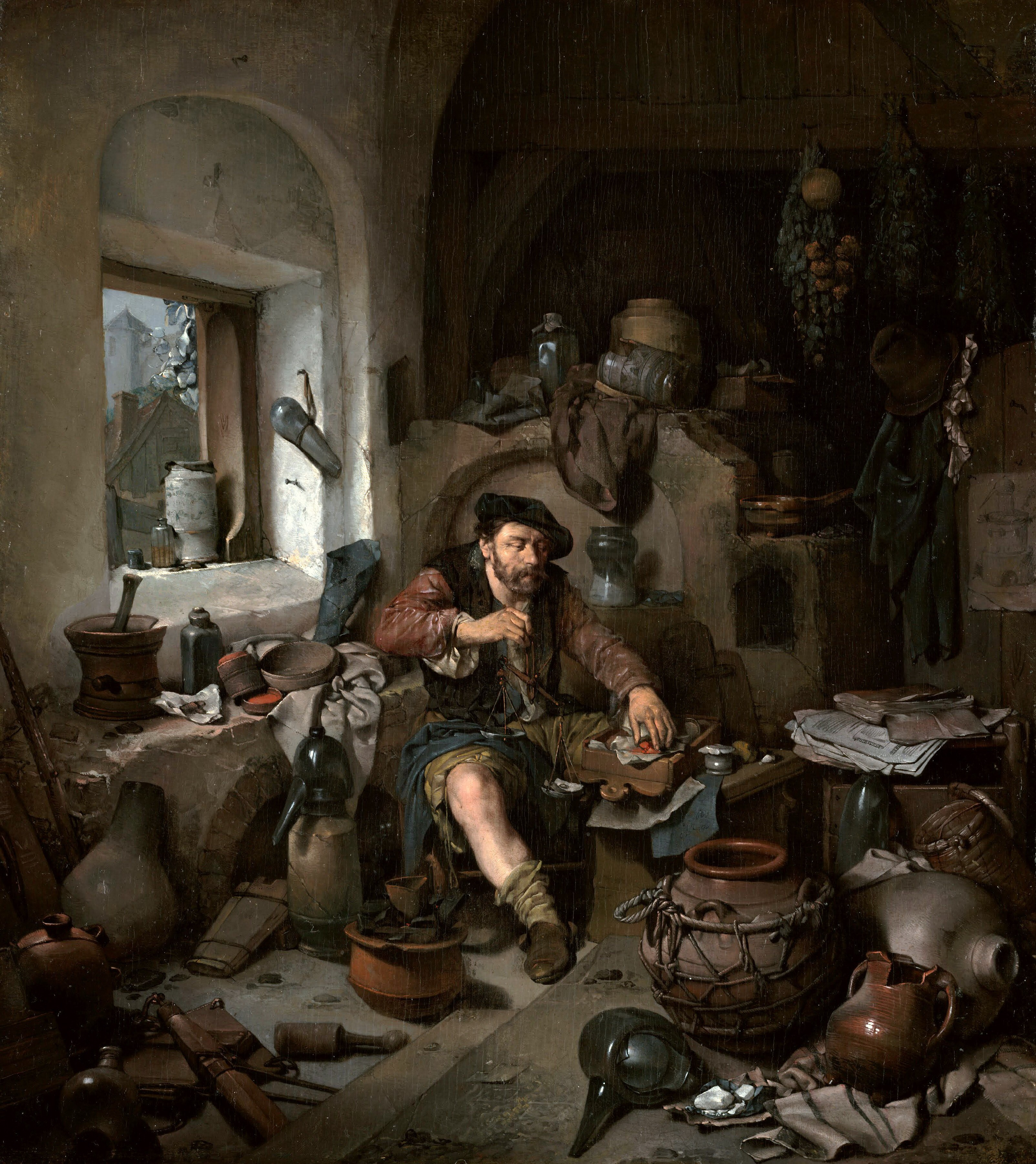
Cornelis Pietersz Bega, 1663

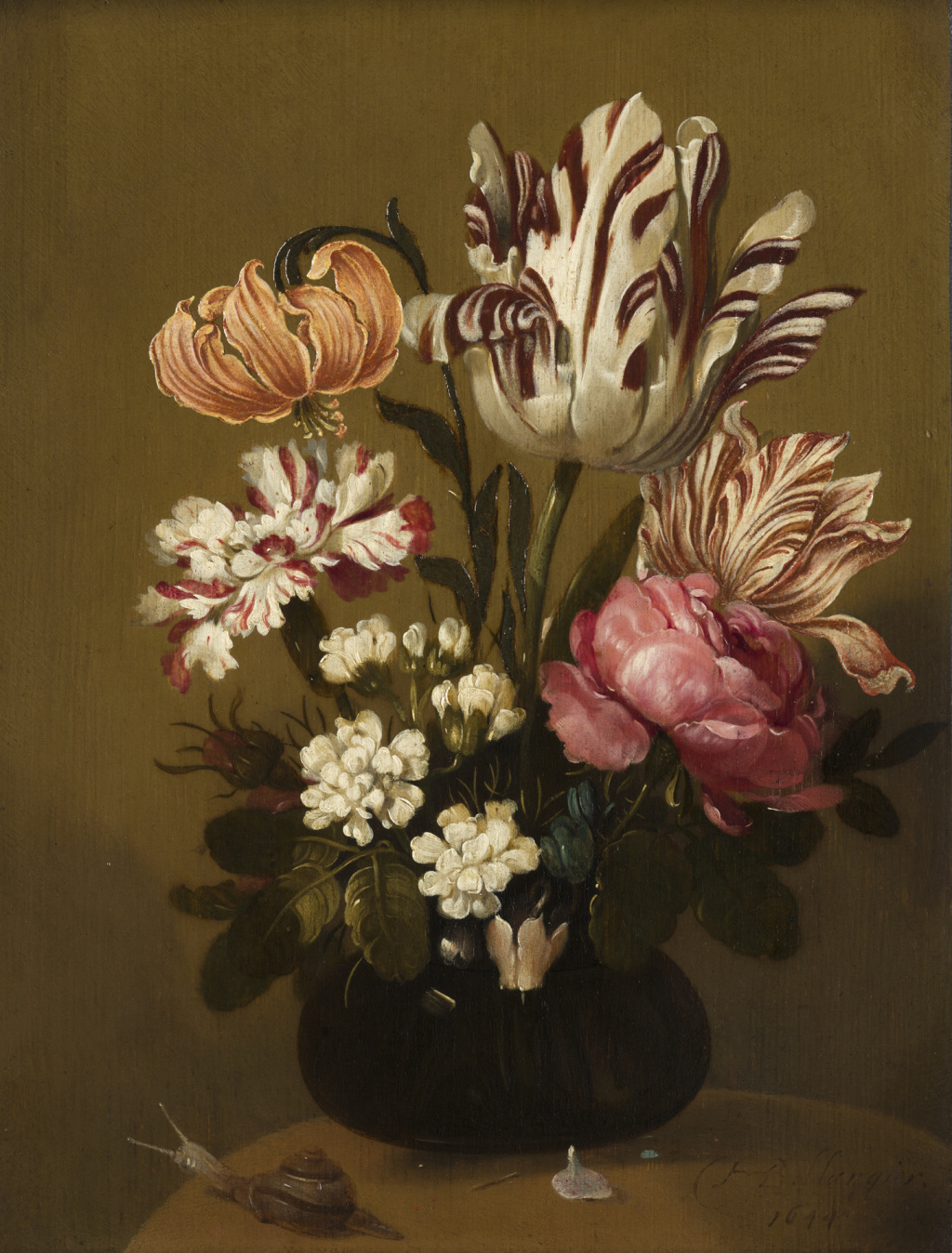
Hans Bollongier, 1644

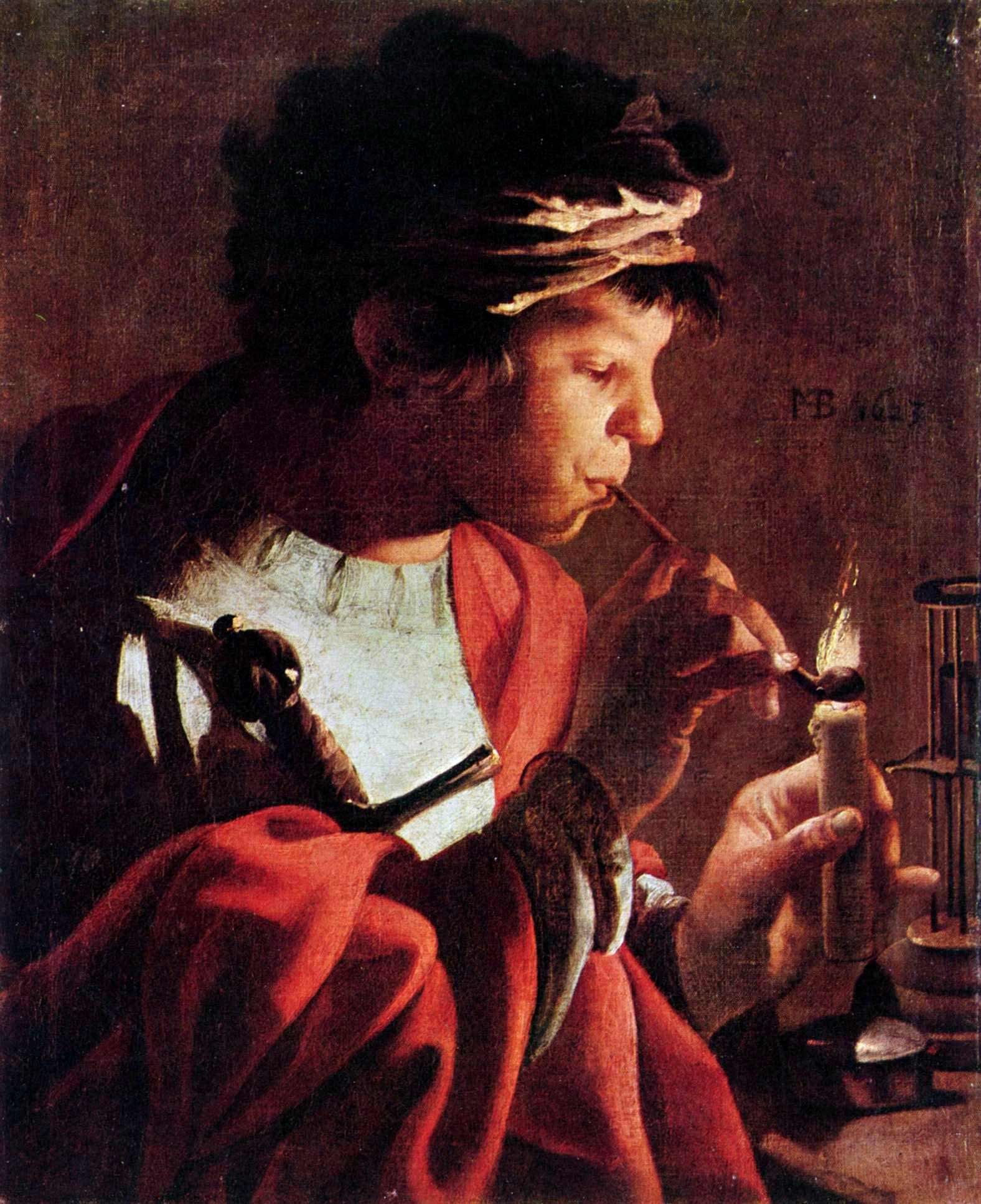
Hendrick ter Brugghen, 1623

- Baburen, Dirck van (Wijk bij Duurstede 1595 – Utrecht 1624)
- Backer, Jacob Adriaensz (Harlingen 1608 – Amsterdam 1651)
- Backhuizen, Ludolf (Emden 1630 – Amsterdam 1708)
- Baen, Jan de (Haarlem 1633 – The Hague 1702)
- Bailly, David (Leiden 1584 – Leiden 1657)
- Bary, Hendrik (Gouda c. 1640 – Gouda 1707)
- Bassen, Bartholomeus van (Antwerp 1590 – The Hague 1652)
- Battem, Gerrit (Rotterdam c. 1636 – Rotterdam 1684)
- Beck, David (Delft 1621 – The Hague 1656)
- Beeck, Johannes van der (Amsterdam 1589 – Amsterdam 1644)
- Beecq, Jan Karel Donatus van (Amsterdam 1638 – Amsterdam 1732)
- Beelt, Cornelis (Rotterdam c. 1630 – Haarlem or Rotterdam 1702)
- Beerstraaten, Jan Abrahamsz (Amsterdam 1622 – Amsterdam 1666)
- Bega, Cornelis Pietersz (Haarlem 1632 – Haarlem 1664)
- Begeyn, Abraham Jansz (Leiden 1637 – Berlin 1697)
- Beijeren, Abraham van (The Hague 1620 – Overschie 1690)
- Berchem, Nicolaes Pietersz (Haarlem 1620 – Amsterdam 1683)
- Berckheyde, Gerrit Adriaensz (Haarlem 1638 – Haarlem 1698)
- Berckheyde, Job Adriaensz (Haarlem 1630 – Haarlem 1693)
- Berghe, Christoffel van den (Middelburg 1590 – Middelburg 1645)
- Bijlert, Jan van (Utrecht 1597 – Utrecht 1671)
- Bisschop, Cornelis (Dordrecht 1630 – Dordrecht 1674)
- Bleker, Gerrit Claesz (Haarlem 1593 – Haarlem 1656)
- Bloemaert, Abraham (Gorinchem 1566 – Utrecht 1651)
- Bloemaert, Cornelis (Utrecht 1603 – Rome 1692)
- Bloemaert, Hendrick (Utrecht 1601 – Utrecht 1672)
- Bloot, Pieter de (Rotterdam 1601 – Rotterdam 1658)
- Bol, Ferdinand (Dordrecht 1616 – Amsterdam 1680)
- Bollongier, Hans (Haarlem c. 1600 – Haarlem 1675)
- Bor, Paulus (Amersfoort 1601 – Amersfoort 1669)
- Borch, Gerard (I) ter (Zwolle 1583 – Zwolle 1662)
- Borch, Gerard (II) ter (Zwolle 1617 – Deventer 1681)
- Borch, Gesina ter (Zwolle 1633 – Deventer 1690)
- Borssom, Anthonie van (Amsterdam 1631 – Amsterdam 1677)
- Bosschaert, Abraham (Middelburg 1612 – Utrecht 1643)
- Bosschaert, Ambrosius (I) (Antwerp 1573 – The Hague 1621)
- Bosschaert, Ambrosius (II) (Utrecht 1609 – Utrecht 1645)
- Both, Andries (Utrecht 1612 – Venice 1642)
- Both, Jan (Utrecht c. 1614 – Utrecht 1652)
- Boursse, Esaias (Amsterdam 1631 – at sea 1672)
- Brakenburg, Richard (Haarlem 1650 – Haarlem 1702)
- Bramer, Leonard (Delft 1596 – Delft 1674)
- Bray, Jan de (Haarlem 1627 – Haarlem 1697)
- Bray, Salomon de (Amsterdam 1597 – Haarlem 1664)
- Breenbergh, Bartholomeus (Deventer 1598 – Amsterdam 1657)
- Brekelenkam, Quiringh van (Zwammerdam 1622 – Leiden 1669)
- Broeck, Elias van den (Antwerp 1649 – Amsterdam 1708)
- Bronckhorst, Jan Gerritsz van (Utrecht 1603 – Amsterdam 1661)
- Brouwer, Adriaen (Oudenaarde 1605 – Antwerp 1638)
- Brugghen, Hendrick ter (Utrecht 1588 – Utrecht 1629)
- Burgh, Hendrick van der (Naaldwijk 1627 – Leiden? aft. 1666)
- Buytewech, Willem Pietersz (Rotterdam 1591 – Rotterdam 1624)

=== C ===
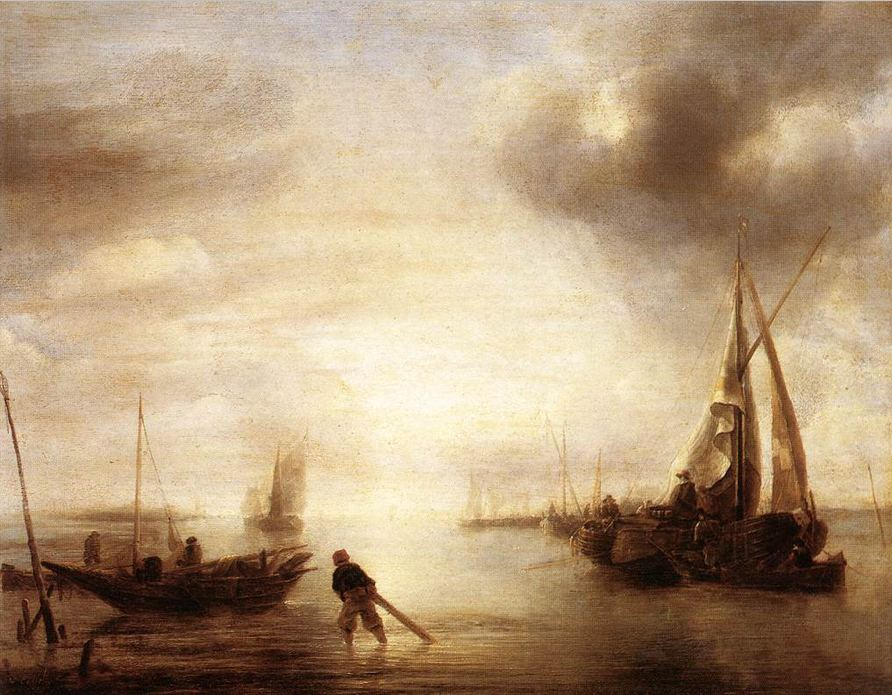
Jan van de Cappelle, 1655

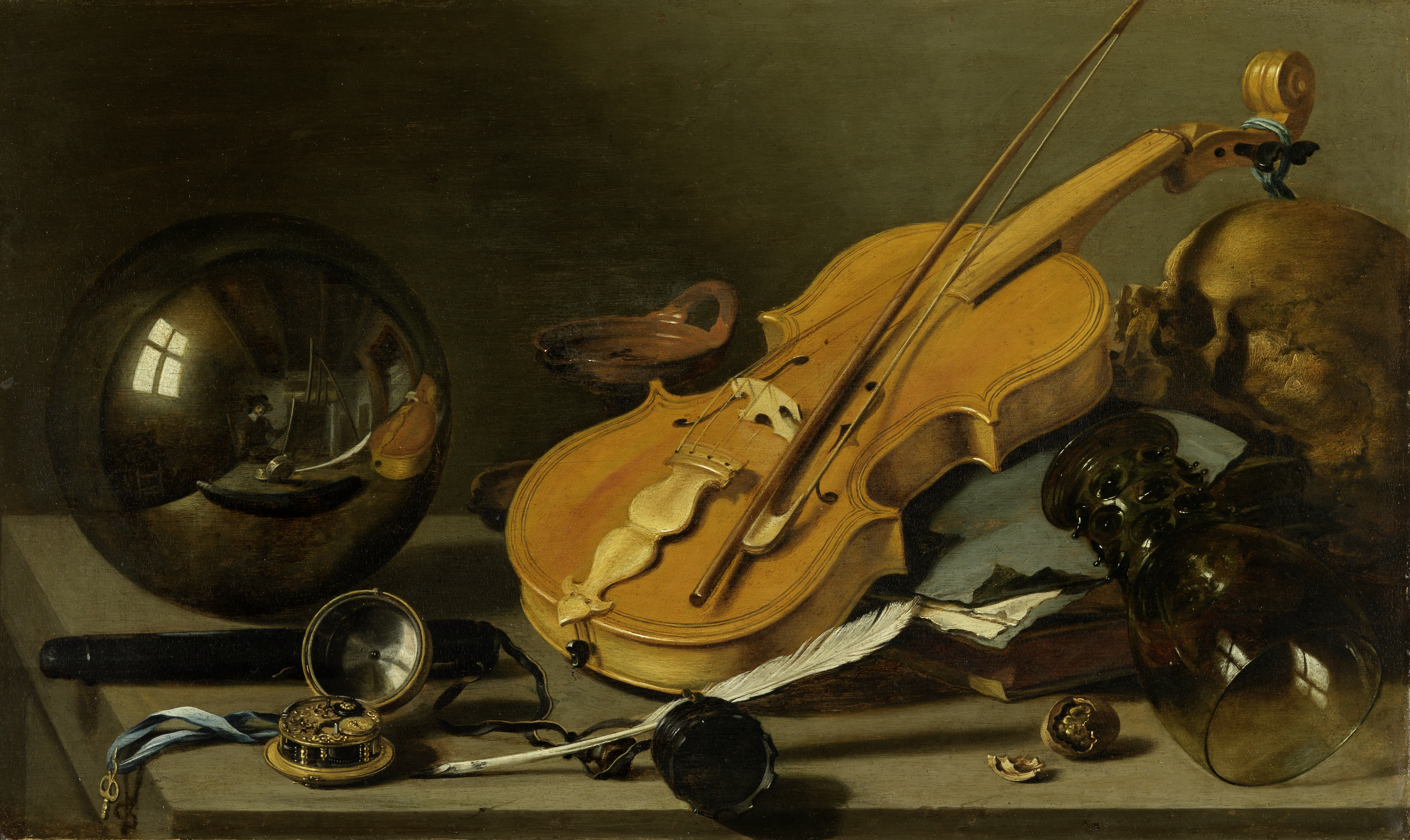
Pieter Claesz, 1628

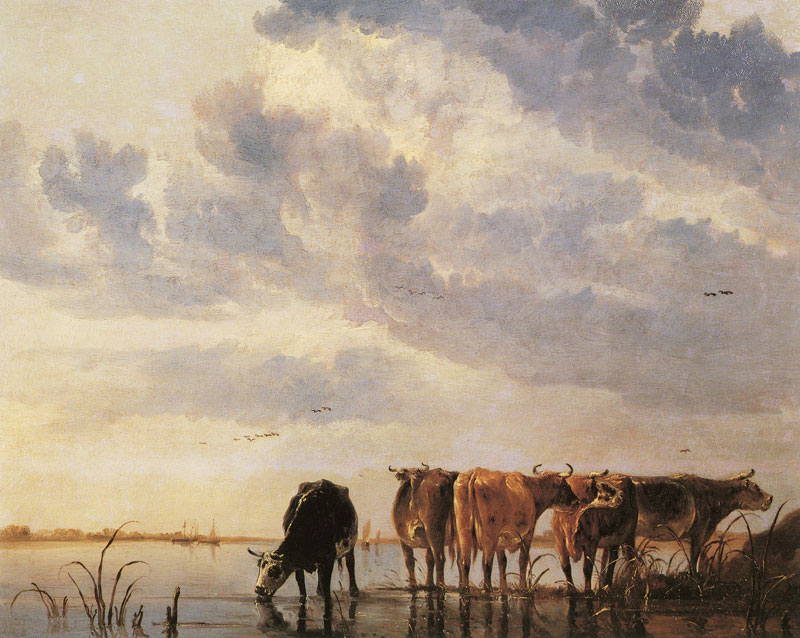
Aelbert Cuyp, c. 1650

- Cabel, Adriaen van der (Rijswijk 1630/31 – Lyon 1705)
- Cabel, Arent Arentsz (Amsterdam 1585/86 – Amsterdam 1631)
- Call, Jan I van (Nijmegen 1656 – The Hague 1706)
- Calraet, Abraham van (Dordrecht 1642 – Dordrecht 1722)
- Campen, Jacob van (Haarlem 1596 – Amersfoort 1657)
- Camphuysen, Govert Dircksz (Gorinchem 1623 – Amsterdam 1672)
- Cappelle, Jan van de (Amsterdam 1626 – Amsterdam 1679)
- Carré, Hendrik (Amsterdam 1656 – The Hague 1721)
- Carrée, Michiel (The Hague 1657 – Alkmaar1727)
- Claesz, Pieter (Berchem 1597/98 – Haarlem 1660)
- Claeuw, Jacques de (Dordrecht 1623 – Leiden 1694)
- Codde, Pieter (Amsterdam 1599 – Amsterdam 1678)
- Collier, Edwaert (Breda 1642 – London 1708)
- Colonia, Adam (Rotterdam 1634 – London 1685)
- Cooghen, Leendert van der (Haarlem 1632 – Haarlem 1681)
- Cool, Jan Daemen (Rotterdam c. 1589 – Rotterdam 1660)
- Coorte, Adriaen (IJzendijke 1659/64 – Vlissingen 1707)
- Cornelisz, Cornelis (Haarlem 1562 – Haarlem 1638)
- Couwenbergh, Christiaen van (Delft 1604 – Cologne 1667)
- Crabeth, Wouter Pietersz (II) (Gouda 1594 – Gouda 1644)
- Cracht, Tyman Arentsz (Wormer, c. 1600 – The Hauge 1646)
- Craen, Laurens (The Hague c. 1620 – Middelburg 1665/70)
- Croos, Anthonie Jansz van der (Alkmaar 1606/07 – The Hague 1662/63)
- Cuylenborch, Abraham van (Utrecht c. 1620 – Utrecht 1658)
- Cuyp, Aelbert (Dordrecht 1620 – Dordrecht 1691)
- Cuyp, Benjamin Gerritsz (Dordrecht 1612 – Dordrecht 1652)
- Cuyp, Jacob Gerritsz (Dordrecht 1594 – Dordrecht 1652)

=== D ===
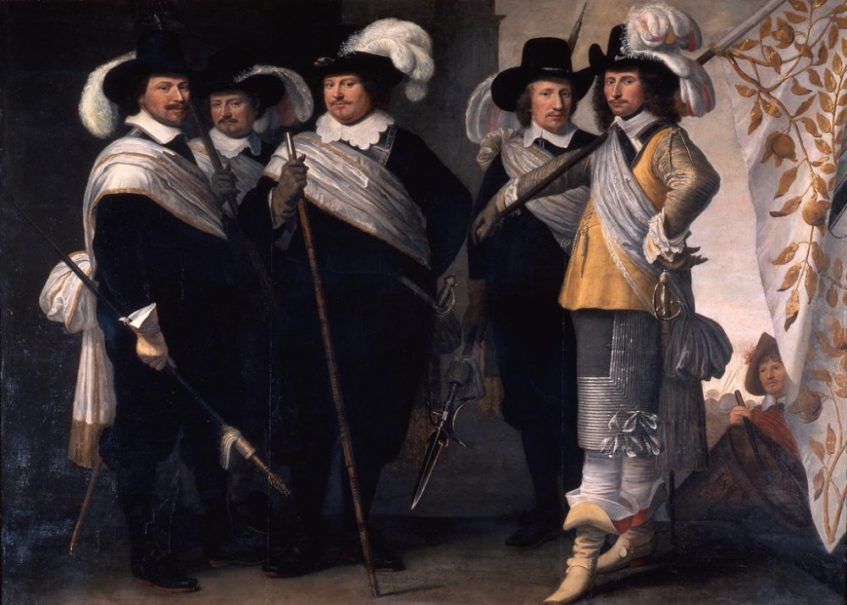
Jacob Willemsz Delff (II), 1648

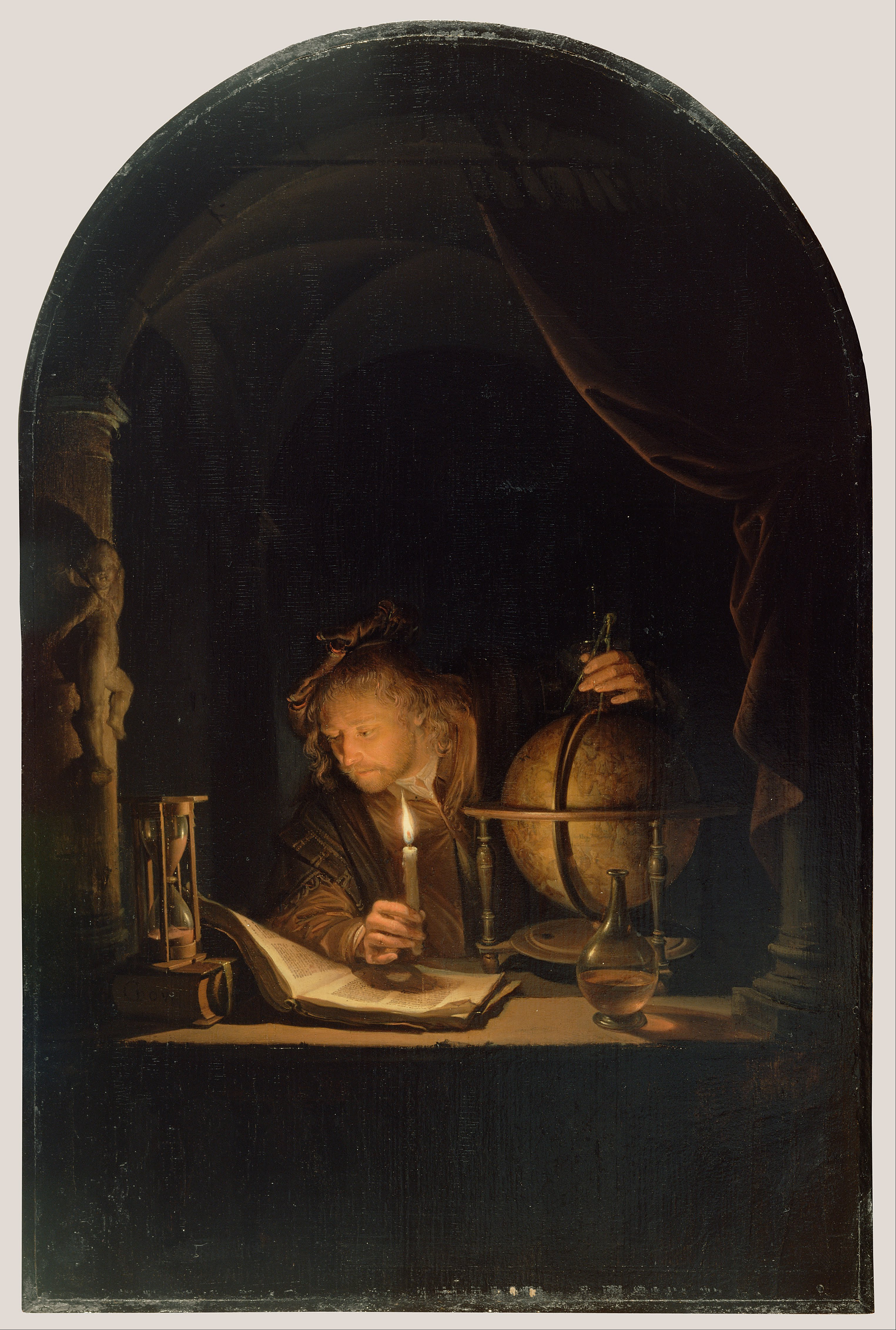
Gerard Dou, 1666

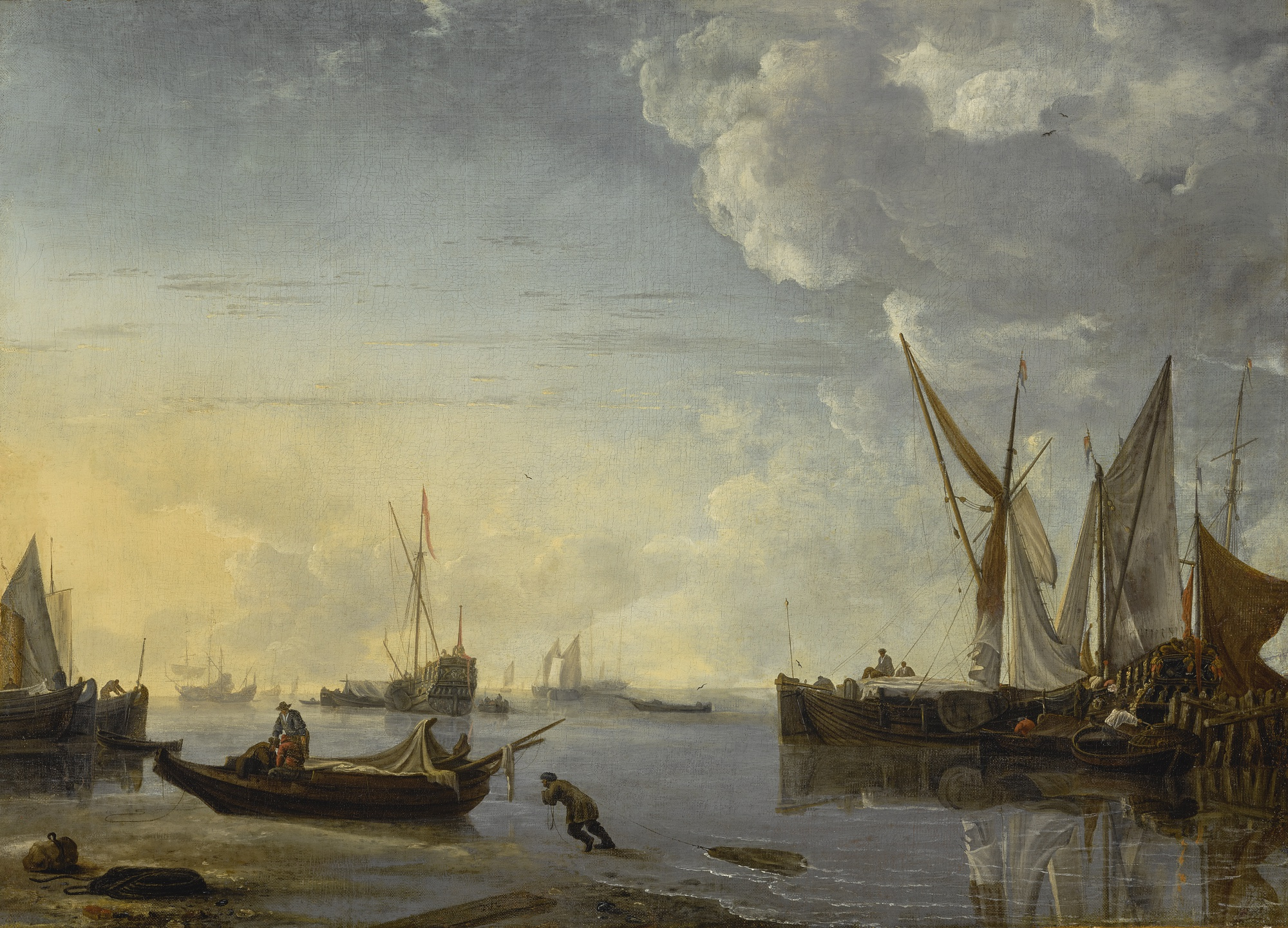
Hendrick Dubbels, c. 1655

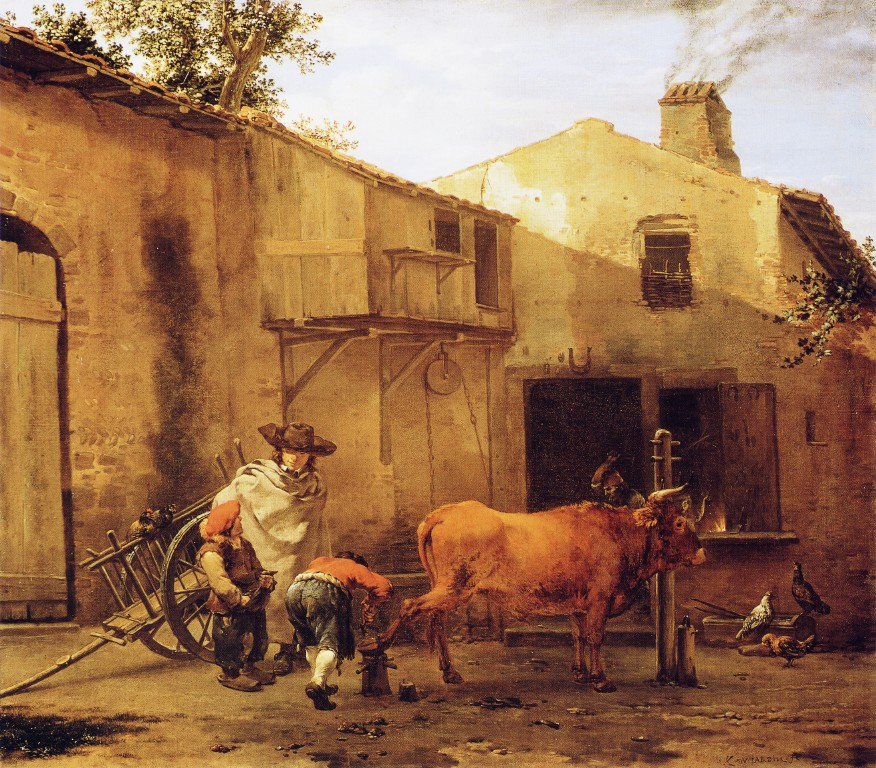
Karel Dujardin, 1650s

- Dalens, Dirck (I) (Dordrecht c. 1600 – Zierikzee 1676)
- Danckerts, Hendrick (The Hague c. 1625 – Amsterdam 1680)
- Danckerts de Rij, Pieter (Amsterdam 1605 – Amsterdam 1660)
- Decker, Cornelis Gerritsz (Haarlem? bef. 1618 – Haarlem 1678)
- Delen, Dirck van (Heusden 1604/05 – Arnemuiden 1671)
- Delff, Cornelis Jacobsz (Gouda 1570/71 – Delft 1643)
- Delff, Jacob Willemsz (II) (Delft 1619 – Delft 1661)
- Delff, Willem Jacobsz (Delft 1580 – Delft 1638)
- Diepenbeeck, Abraham van (Den Bosch 1596 – Antwerp 1675)
- Diepraam, Abraham (Rotterdam 1622 – Rotterdam 1670)
- Diest, Adriaen van (The Hague 1655 – London 1704)
- Diest, Jeronymus van (II) (The Hague 1631 – The Hague aft. 1677)
- Diest, Willem van (The Hague c. 1600 – unknown 1668/72)
- Dijck, Abraham van (Amsterdam? 1635/36 – Dordrecht 1680)
- Dijck, Floris van (Delft 1574/75 – Haarlem 1651)
- Does, Jacob van der (Amsterdam 1623 – Sloten, 1673)
- Does, Simon van der (The Hague 1653 – Antwerp, aft. 1718))
- Donck, Gerard (fl. Amsterdam 1627–1640)
- Doncker, Herman (Haarlem c.1595-1655)
- Doomer, Lambert (Amsterdam 1624 – Amsterdam 1700)
- Dou, Gerard (Leiden 1613 – Leiden 1675)
- Doudijns, Willem (The Hague 1630 – The Hague 1697)
- Douven, Jan Frans van (Roermond 1656 – Düsseldorf 1727)
- Droochsloot, Cornelis (Utrecht 1640 – Utrecht? aft. 1673)
- Droochsloot, Joost Cornelisz (Utrecht 1586 – Utrecht 1666)
- Drost, Willem (Amsterdam 1633 – Amsterdam 1659)
- Du Bois, Guillam (Haarlem 1625 – Haarlem 1680)
- Dubbels, Hendrick Jacobsz (Amsterdam 1621 – Amsterdam 1707)
- Dubordieu, Pieter (L'Île-Bouchard 1609 – Amsterdam? >1678)
- Duck, Jacob (Utrecht? c.1600 – Utrecht 1667)
- Ducq, Johan le (The Hague 1629 – The Hague 1676)
- Dujardin, Karel (Amsterdam 1626 – Venice 1678)
- Dullaart, Heiman (Rotterdam 1636 – Rotterdam 1684)
- Dusart, Cornelis (Haarlem 1660 – Haarlem 1704)
- Duyfhuysen, Pieter Jacobsz (Rotterdam 1608 – Rotterdam 1677)
- Duynen, Isaac van (Dordrecht 1628 – The Hague 1680)
- Duyster, Willem Cornelisz (Amsterdam 1599 – Amsterdam 1635)
- Dyck, Floris van (Delft 1574/75 – Haarlem 1651)

=== E–F ===
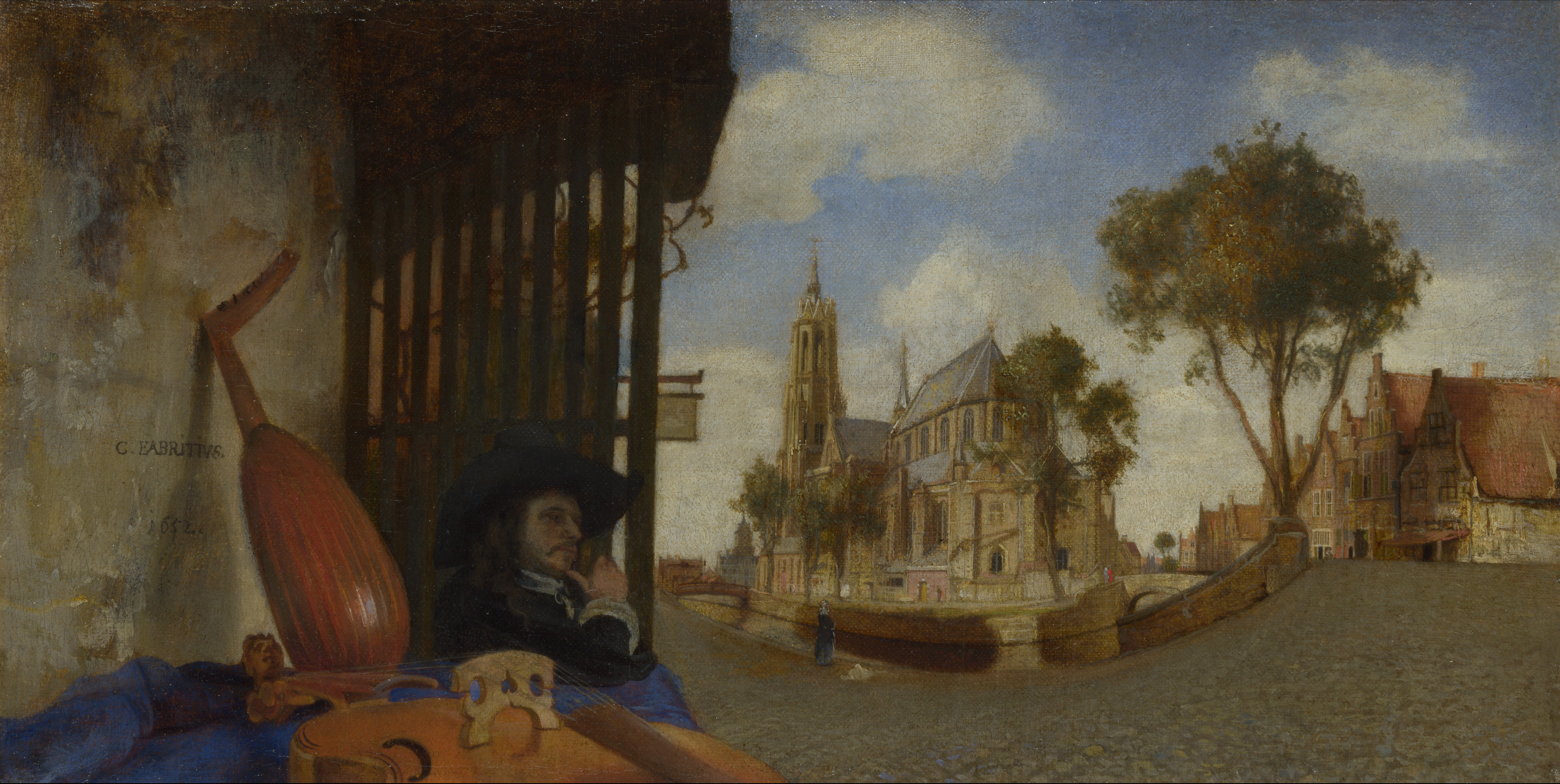
Carel Fabritius, 1652

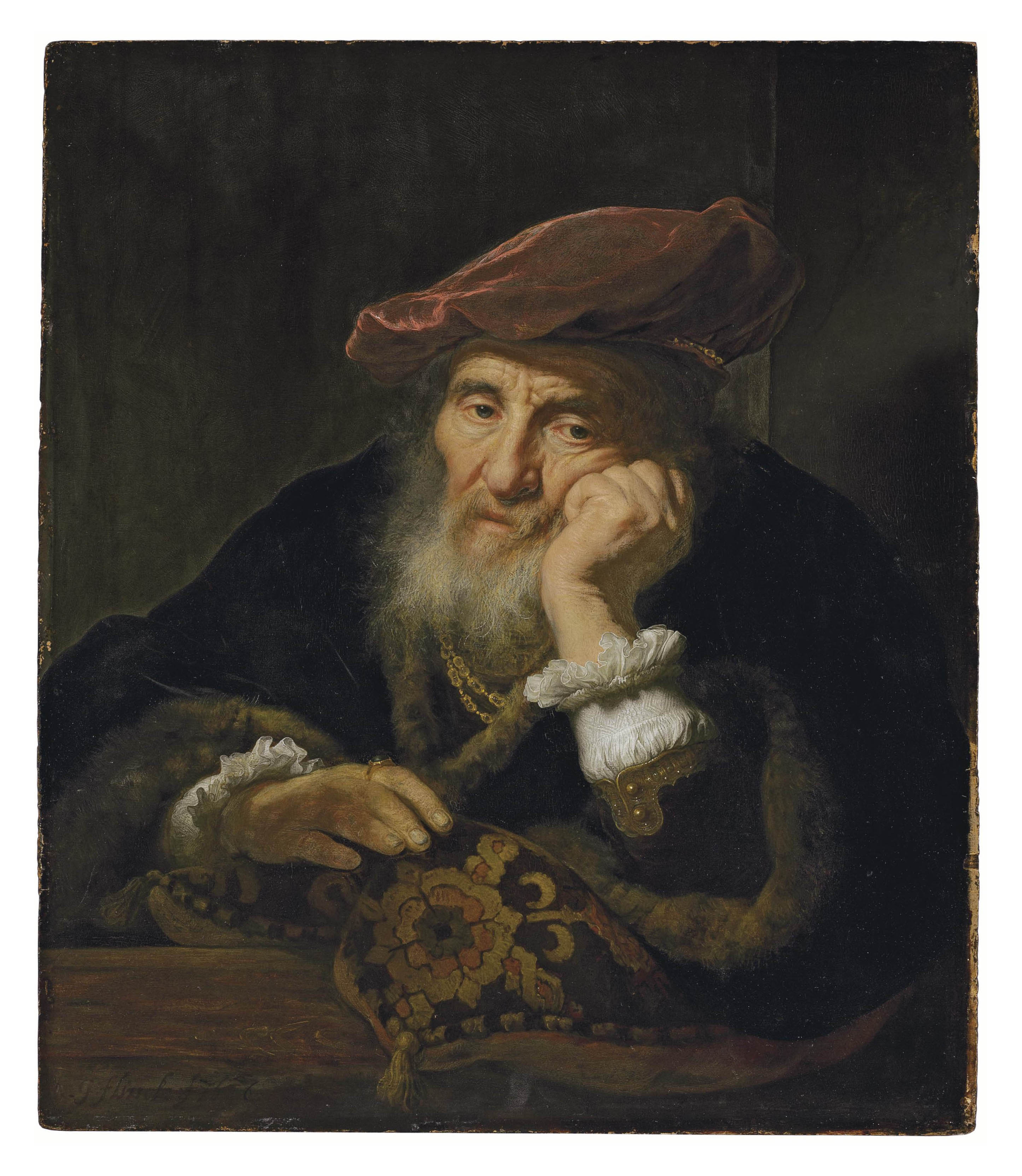
Govert Flinck, 1646

- Eckhout, Albert (Groningen c. 1610 – Groningen 1665/66)
- Eeckhout, Gerbrand van den (Amsterdam 1621 – Amsterdam 1674)
- Egmont, Justus van (Leiden 1601 – Antwerp 1674)
- Elinga, Pieter Janssens (Bruges 1623 – Amsterdam 1682)
- Engelsz, Cornelis (Gouda 1574/75 – Haarlem 1650)
- Esselens, Jacob (Amsterdam 1627/28 – Amsterdam 1687)
- Everdingen, Allaert van (Alkmaar 1621 – Amsterdam 1675)
- Everdingen, Cesar Boetius van (Alkmaar 1616/17 – Alkmaar 1678)
- Eversdijck, Willem (Goes 1616/20 – Middelburg 1671)
- Fabritius, Barent (Middenbeemster 1624 – Amsterdam 1673)
- Fabritius, Carel (Middenbeemster 1622 – Delft 1654)
- Fabritius, Johannes (Middenbeemster 1636 – Hoorn aft. 1693)
- Feddes van Harlingen, Pieter (Harlingen c. 1586 – Leeuwarden 1623)
- Flinck, Govert (Cleves 1615 – Amsterdam 1660)
- Fornenburgh, Jan Baptist van (Antwerp c. 1590 – The Hague 1648)
- Fris, Pieter (Amsterdam 1628 – Delft 1706)
- Fromantiou, Henri de (Maastricht 1633/34 – Potsdam aft. 1693)
- Furnerius, Abraham (Rotterdam 1628 – Rotterdam 1654)

=== G ===
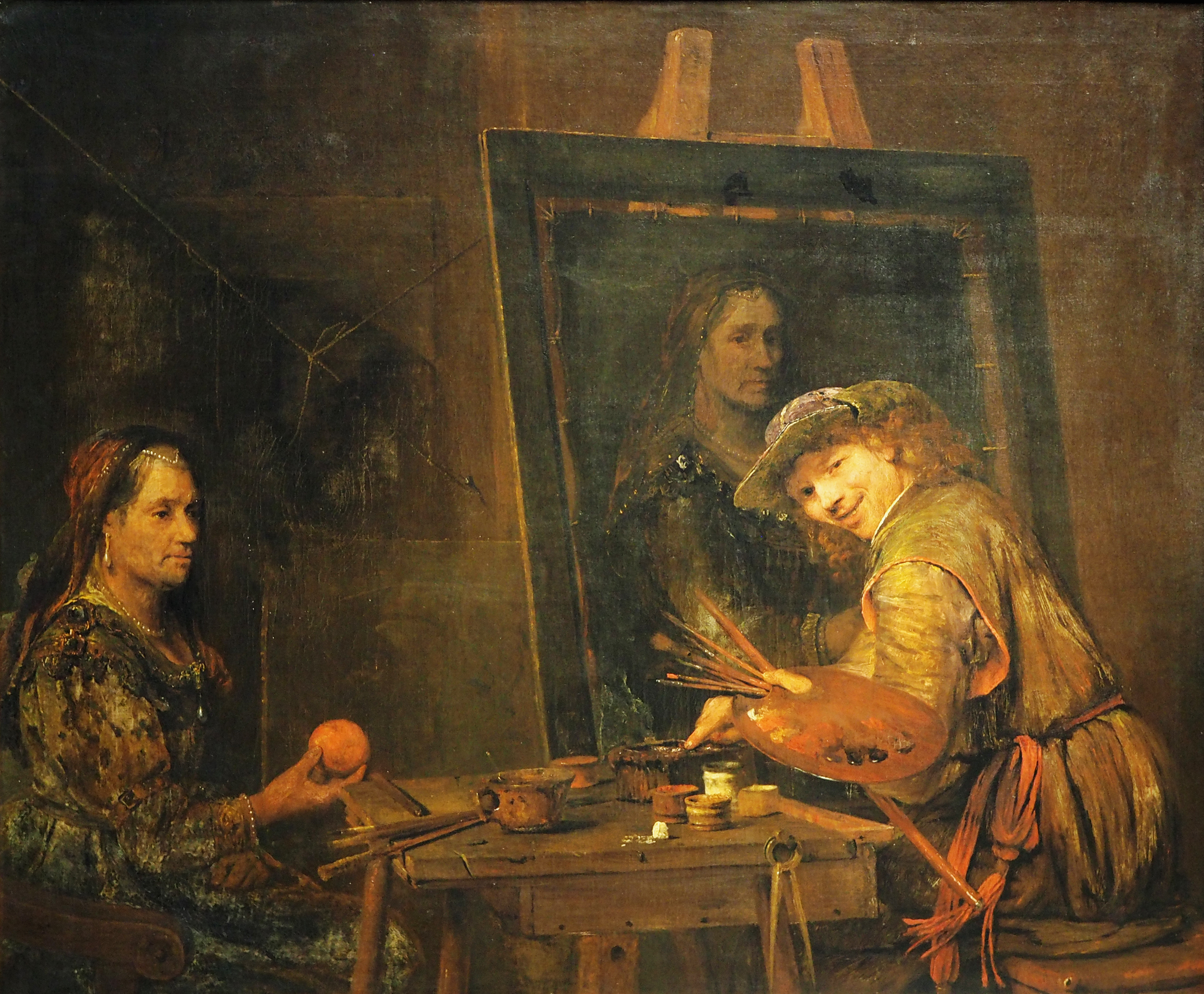
Aert de Gelder, 1685

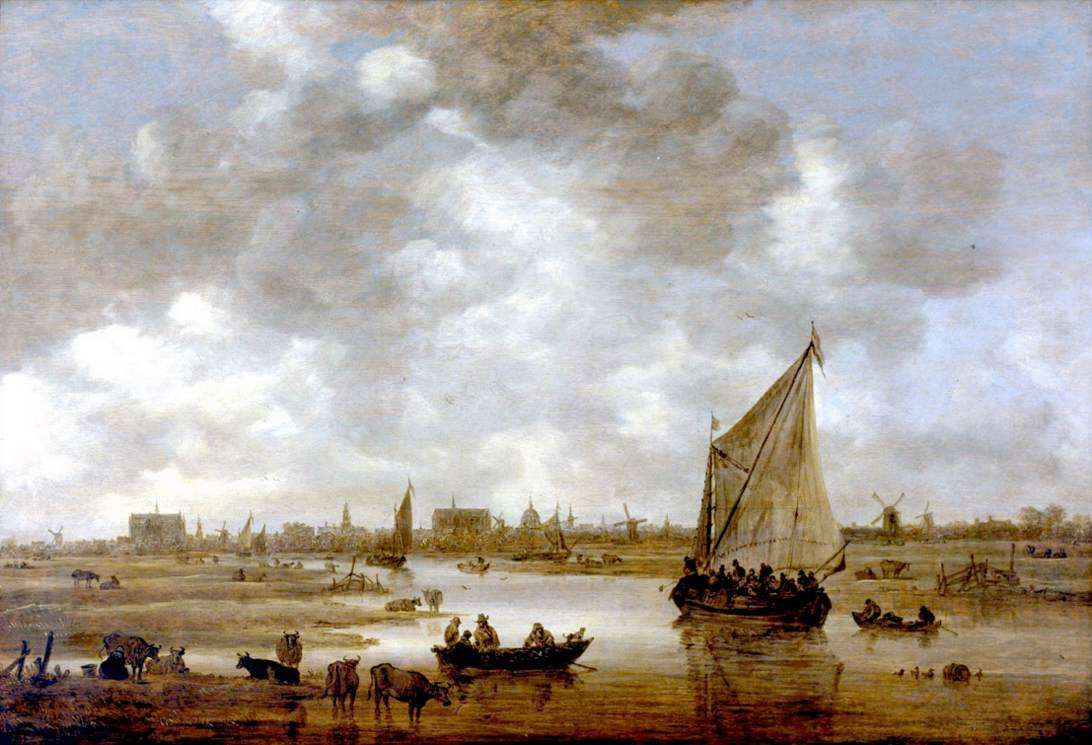
Jan van Goyen, 1650

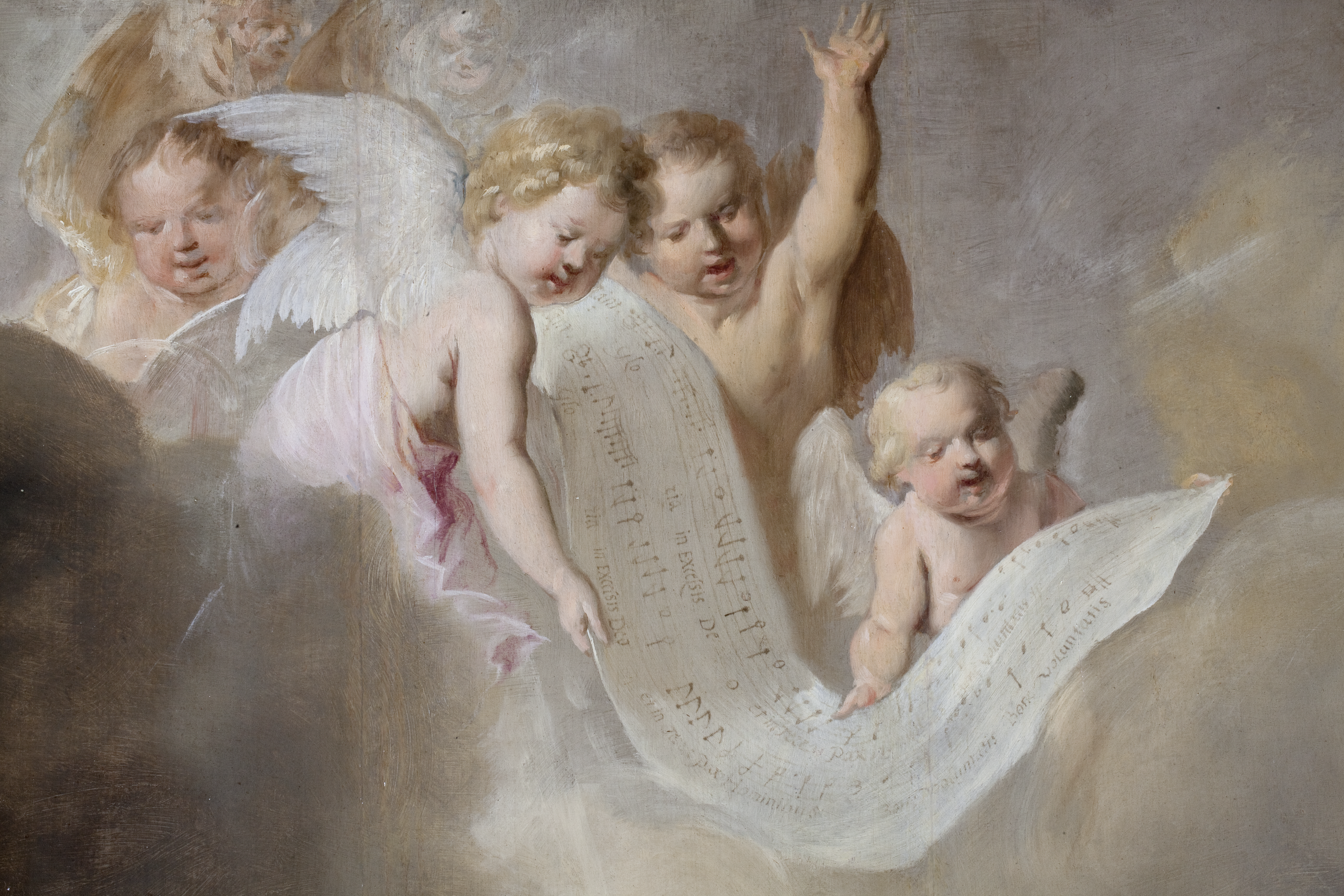
Pieter de Grebber, 1633

- Gael, Barent (Haarlem c. 1630 – Amsterdam 1698)
- Gaesbeeck, Adriaen van (Leiden 1621 – Leiden 1650)
- Gallis, Pieter (Enkhuizen 1633 – Hoorn 1697)
- Geel, Jacob van (Middelburg 1584/85 – Dordrecht? aft. 1638)
- Geel, Joost van (Rotterdam 1631 – Rotterdam 1698)
- Geest, Wybrand de (Leeuwarden 1592 – Leeuwarden aft. 1661)
- Gelder, Aert de (Dordrecht 1645 – Dordrecht 1727)
- Gelder, Nicolaes van (Leiden c. 1636 – Amsterdam 1677)
- Gherwen, Reynier van (Leiden c. 1620 – Leiden 1662)
- Gheyn, Jacques de (II) (Antwerp 1565 – The Hague 1629)
- Gheyn, Jacques de (III) (Haarlem or Leiden 1596 – Utrecht 1641)
- Gillig, Jacob (Utrecht c. 1636 – Utrecht 1701)
- Gillis, Nicolaes (Antwerp 1592/93 – Haarlem aft. 1632)
- Giselaer, Nicolaes (Dordrecht 1583 – Utrecht 1647)
- Glauber, Diana (Utrecht 1650 – Hamburg aft. 1721)
- Glauber, Johannes (Utrecht 1646 – Schoonhoven 1726)
- Goderis, Hans (Haarlem 1595/1600 – Haarlem 1656/59)
- Goedaert, Johannes (Middelburg 1617 – Middelburg 1668)
- Goudt, Hendrick (The Hague c. 1583 – Utrecht 1648)
- Goyen, Jan van (Leiden 1596 – The Hague 1656)
- Graat, Barend (Amsterdam 1628 – Amsterdam 1709)
- Grebber, Frans Pietersz de (Haarlem c. 1573 – Haarlem 1649)
- Grebber, Maria de (Haarlem c. 1602 – Enkhuizen 1680)
- Grebber, Pieter de (Haarlem c. 1600 – Haarlem 1652/53)
- Griffier, Jan (I) (Amsterdam 1645/52 – London 1718)
- Groenewegen, Pieter Anthonisz. van (Delft c. 1600 – The Hague 1658)

=== H ===
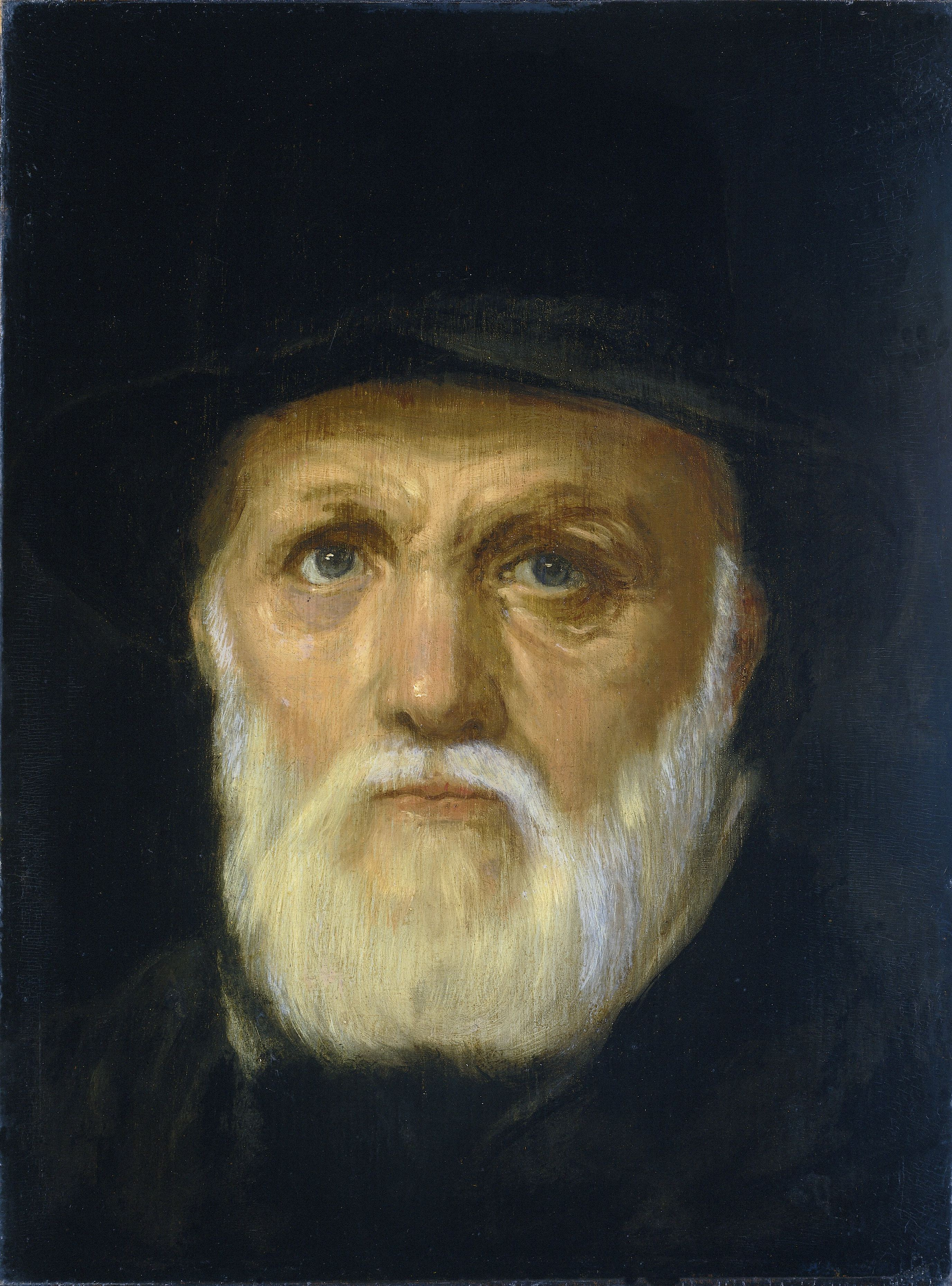
Cornelis van Haarlem, c. 1590

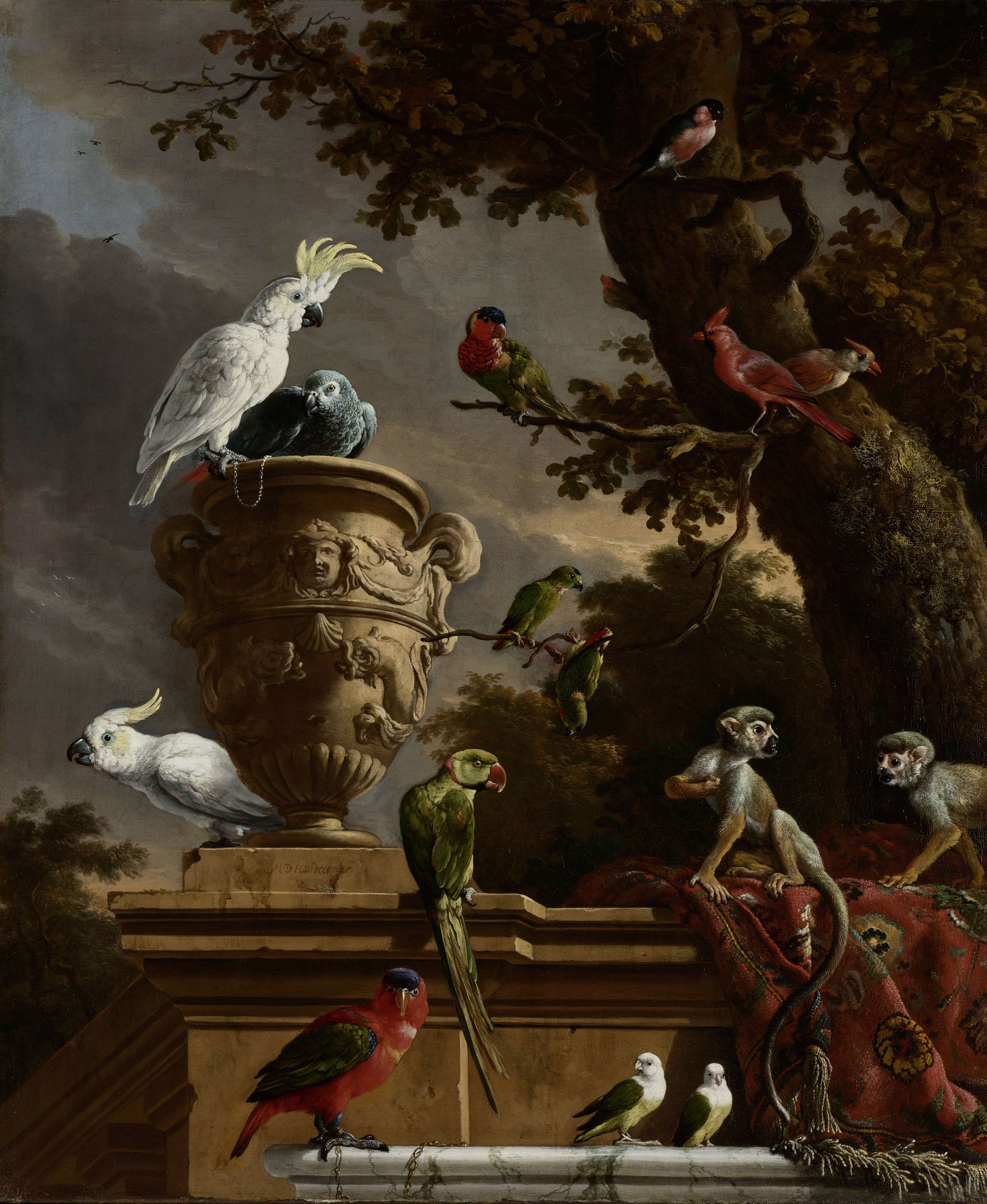
Melchior d'Hondecoeter, 2nd half of 17th century

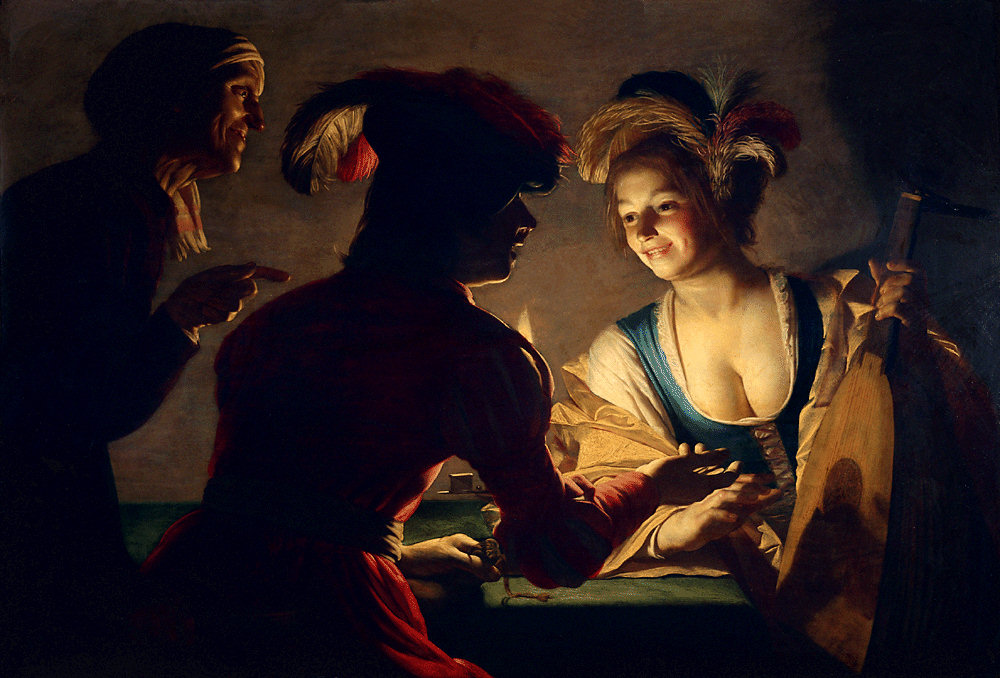
Gerard van Honthorst, 1625

- Haagen, Joris van der (Arnhem 1615 – The Hague 1669)
- Haarlem, Cornelis Cornelisz van (Haarlem 1562 – Haarlem 1638)
- Hackaert, Jan (Amsterdam 1628 – Amsterdam aft. 1685)
- Hals, Dirck (Haarlem 1591 – Haarlem 1656)
- Hals, Frans (Antwerp 1582 – Haarlem 1666)
- Hanneman, Adriaen (The Hague 1603/4 – The Hague 1671)
- Heck, Claes Dirckz van der (Alkmaar c. 1595 – Alkmaar 1649)
- Heck, Claes Jacobsz van der (Alkmaar c. 1578 – Alkmaar 1652)
- Hecken, Abraham van den (Antwerp c. 1610 – Amsterdam? aft. 1655)
- Heda, Gerret Willemsz (Haarlem c. 1625 – Haarlem 1649)
- Heda, Willem Claesz (Haarlem 1594 – Haarlem 1680)
- Heem, Cornelis de (Leiden 1631 – Antwerp 1695)
- Heem, David Cornelisz de (Antwerp 1663 – The Hague? aft. 1701)
- Heem, Jan Davidsz de (Utrecht 1606 – Antwerp 1683)
- Heem, Jan Jansz. de (Antwerp 1650 – Antwerp 1695)
- Heemskerck, Egbert van (Haarlem 1634 – London 1704)
- Helmbreker, Dirk (Haarlem 1633 – Rome 1696)
- Helst, Bartholomeus van der (Haarlem 1613 – Amsterdam 1670)
- Heusch, Jacob de (Utrecht 1657 – Amsterdam 1701)
- Heusch, Willem de (Utrecht 1625 – Utrecht 1692)
- Heyden, Jan van der (Gorinchem 1637 – Amsterdam 1712)
- Hobbema, Meindert (Amsterdam 1638 – Amsterdam 1709)
- Hoet, Gerard (Zaltbommel 1648 – The Hague 1733)
- Hondecoeter, Gillis Claesz d' (Antwerp c. 1575 – Amsterdam 1638)
- Hondecoeter, Melchior d' (Utrecht 1636 – Amsterdam 1695)
- Hondius, Abraham (Rotterdam 1625 – London 1691)
- Honthorst, Gerard van (Utrecht 1592 – Utrecht 1656)
- Hooch, Pieter de (Rotterdam 1629 – Amsterdam 1684)
- Hooghe, Romeyn de (Amsterdam 1645 – Haarlem 1708)
- Hoogstraten, Samuel van (Dordrecht 1627 – Dordrecht 1678)
- Houbraken, Arnold (Dordrecht 1660 – Amsterdam 1719)
- Houckgeest, Gerard (The Hague 1600 – Bergen op Zoom 1661)
- Huchtenburg, Jan van (Haarlem 1647 – Amsterdam 1733)
- Hulst, Frans de (Haarlem c. 1610 – Haarlem 1661)

=== I–J ===
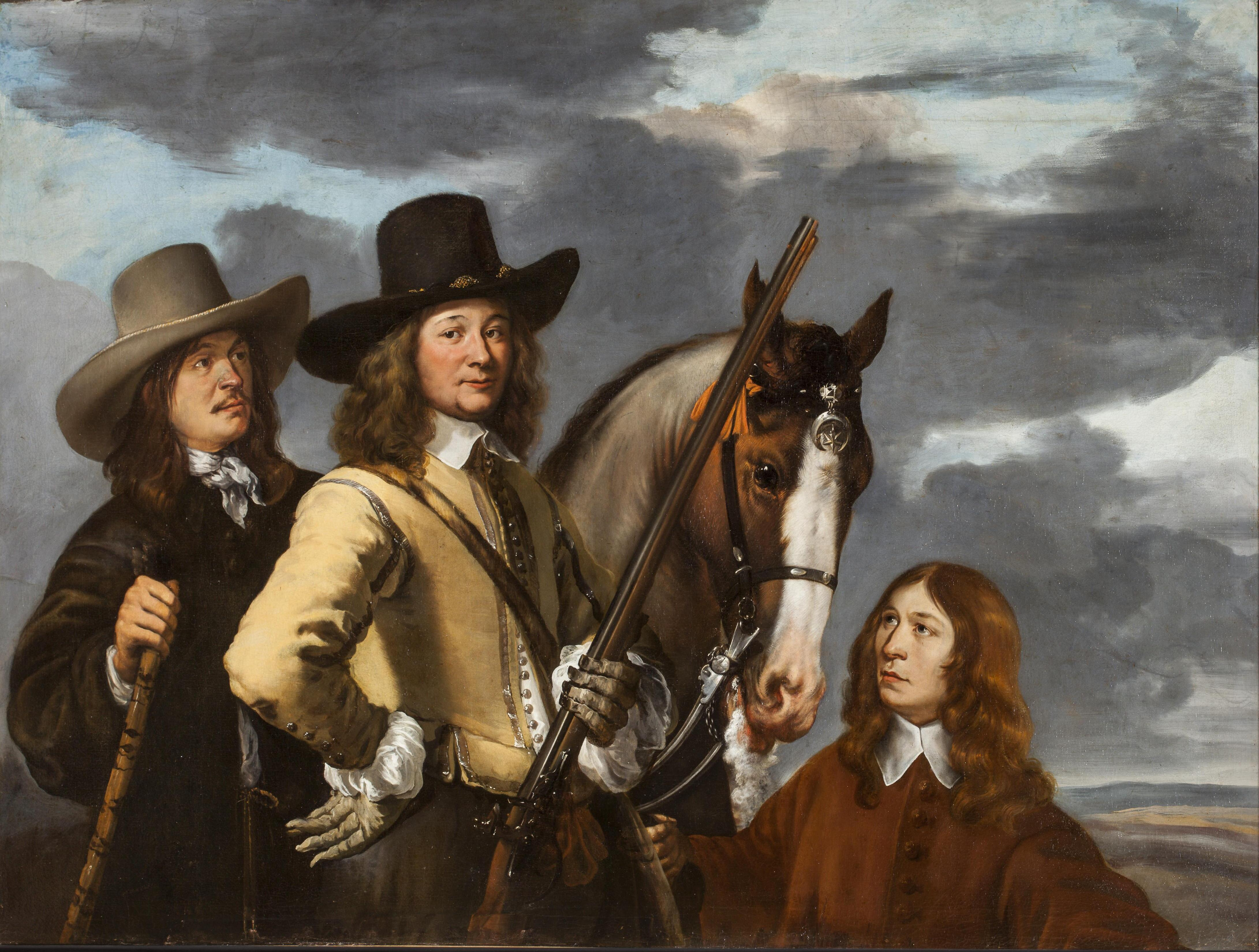
Ludolf de Jongh, c. 1655

- Isaacsz, Pieter (Helsingør 1568 – Amsterdam 1625)
- Jacobsz, Lambert (Amsterdam c. 1598 – Leeuwarden 1636)
- Jacobsze, Juriaen (Hamburg 1624 – Leeuwarden 1685)
- Jansz de Stomme, Jan (Franeker 1615 – Groningen 1658)
- Jongh, Claude de (Utrecht 1605/06 – Utrecht 1663)
- Jongh, Ludolf de (Overschie 1616 – Hillegersberg 1679)
- Jonson van Ceulen, Cornelis (London 1593 – Utrecht 1661)
- Jouderville, Isaac de (Leiden 1612 – Amsterdam 1645)

=== K ===
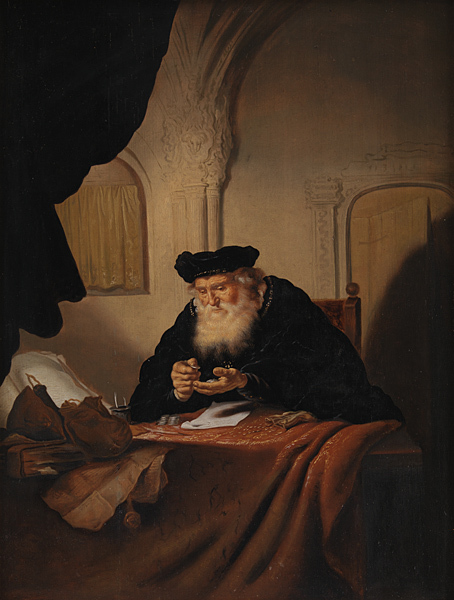
Salomon Koninck, 1635

- Kabel, Adriaen van der (Rijswijk 1630/31 – Lyon 1705)
- Kalf, Willem (Rotterdam 1619 – Amsterdam 1693)
- Keirincx, Alexander (Antwerp 1600 – Amsterdam 1652)
- Kessel, Jan van (Amsterdam 1641 – Amsterdam 1680)
- Keyser, Thomas de (Amsterdam 1596 – Amsterdam 1667)
- Kick, Cornelis (Amsterdam 1634 – Amsterdam 1681)
- Kick, Simon (Delft 1603 – Amsterdam 1652)
- Klomp, Albert Jansz (Amsterdam 1625 – Amsterdam 1688)
- Knibbergen, Catharina van (fl. The Hague 1634 – 1665)
- Knibbergen, François van (The Hague 1596/99 – aft. 1664)
- Knijff, Wouter (Wesel 1605/07 – Bergen op Zoom 1694)
- Knüpfer, Nicolaes (Leipzig c. 1609 – Utrecht 1655)
- Koedijck, Isaac (Amsterdam 1616/17 – Amsterdam 1668)
- Koets, Roelof (Haarlem 1592/93 – Haarlem 1654)
- Koninck, Philips (Amsterdam 1619 – Amsterdam 1688)
- Koninck, Salomon (Amsterdam 1609 – Amsterdam 1656)
- Kruys, Cornelis (Haarlem 1619/20 – Schiedam 1660)
- Kuijl, Gerard van (Gorinchem 1604 – Gorinchem 1673)

=== L ===
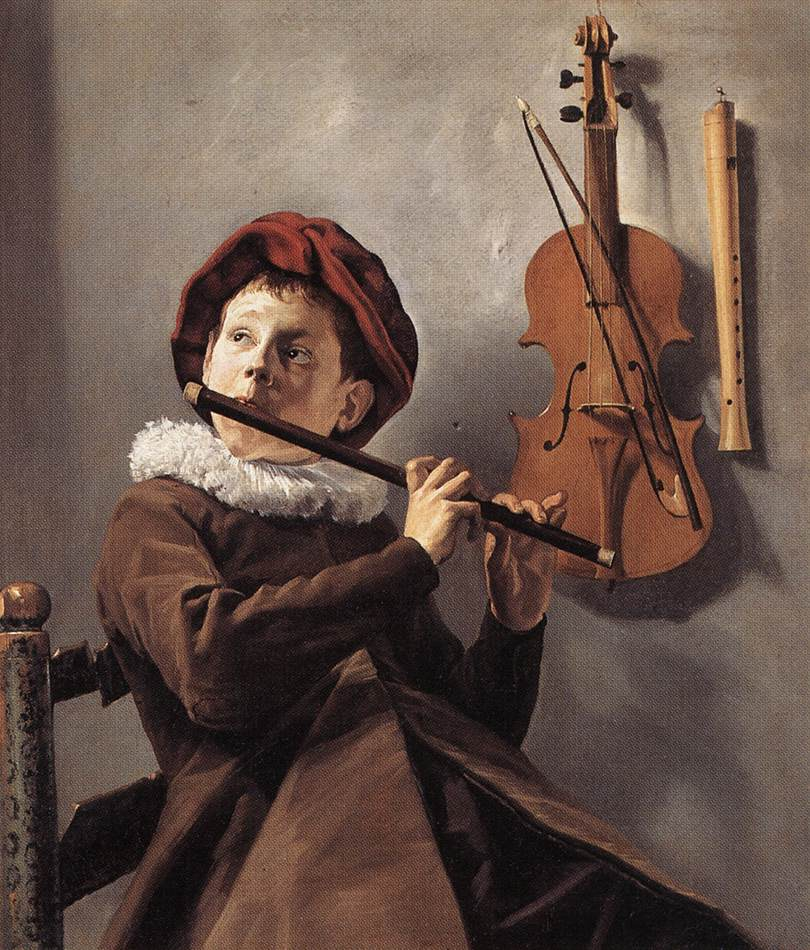
Judith Leyster, c. 1630

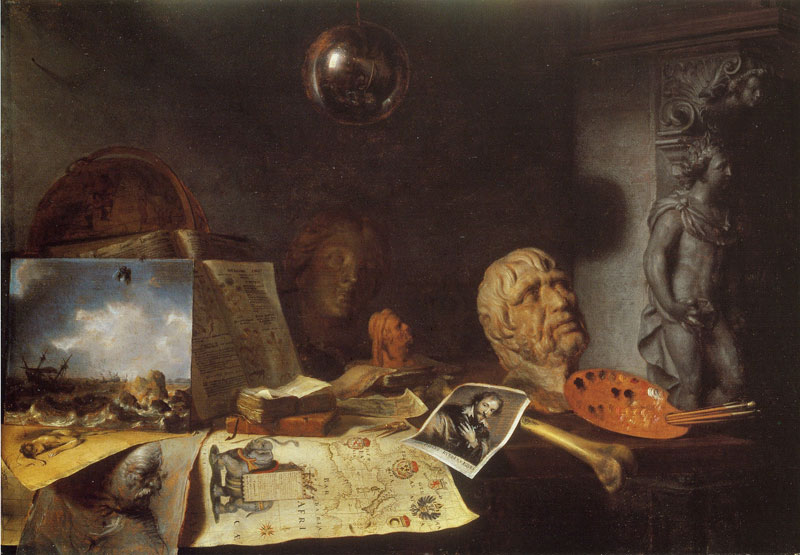
Simon Luttichuys, 1646

- Lachtropius, Nicolaes (Kampen? 1630/40 – Alphen aan den Rijn 1711)
- Laer, Pieter van (Haarlem 1599 – unknown, 1642)
- Lairesse, Gerard de (Liège 1641 – Amsterdam 1711)
- Lastman, Pieter (Amsterdam 1583 – Amsterdam 1633)
- Leemans, Anthonie (The Hague 1631 – Amsterdam or Dordrecht 1671/73)
- Leemans, Johannes (The Hague c. 1633 – The Hague 1688)
- Legouch, Pieter (Lokeren – Middelburg 1664)
- Lely, Peter (Soest 1618 – London 1680)
- Leveck, Jacobus (Dordrecht 1634 – Dordrecht 1675)
- Lesire, Paulus (Dordrecht 1611 – The Hague? aft. 1656)
- Leyster, Judith (Haarlem 1609 – Heemstede 1660)
- Liefrinck, Cornelis (Leiden ca. 1581 – unknown, aft. 1652)
- Lievens, Jan (Leiden 1607 – Amsterdam 1674)
- Lingelbach, Johannes (Frankfurt 1622 – Amsterdam 1674)
- Linsen, Jan (Hoorn 1602/03 – Hoorn 1635)
- Lisse, Dirck van der (The Hague 1607 – The Hague 1669)
- Loo, Jacob van (Sluis 1614 – Paris 1670)
- Looten, Jan (Amsterdam 1617/18 – York 1681)
- Lorme, Anthonie de (Tournai ca. 1610 – Rotterdam 1673)
- Lubieniecki, Christoffel (Szczecin 1658 – Amsterdam 1729)
- Lundens, Gerrit (Amsterdam 1622 – Amsterdam 1686)
- Luttichuys, Isaack (London 1616 – Amsterdam 1673)
- Luttichuys, Simon (London 1610 – Amsterdam 1661)

=== M ===
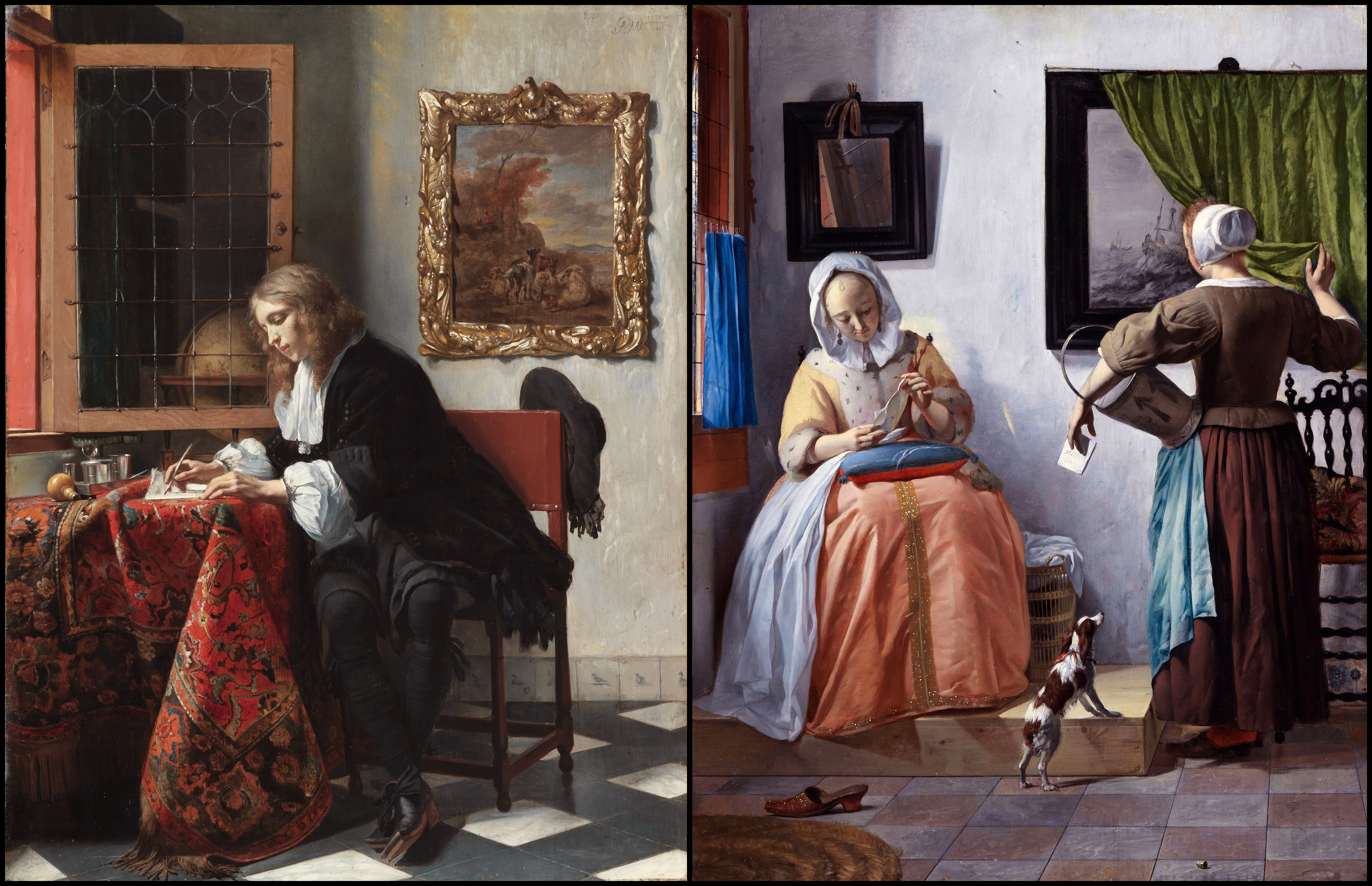
Gabriel Metsu, c. 1665

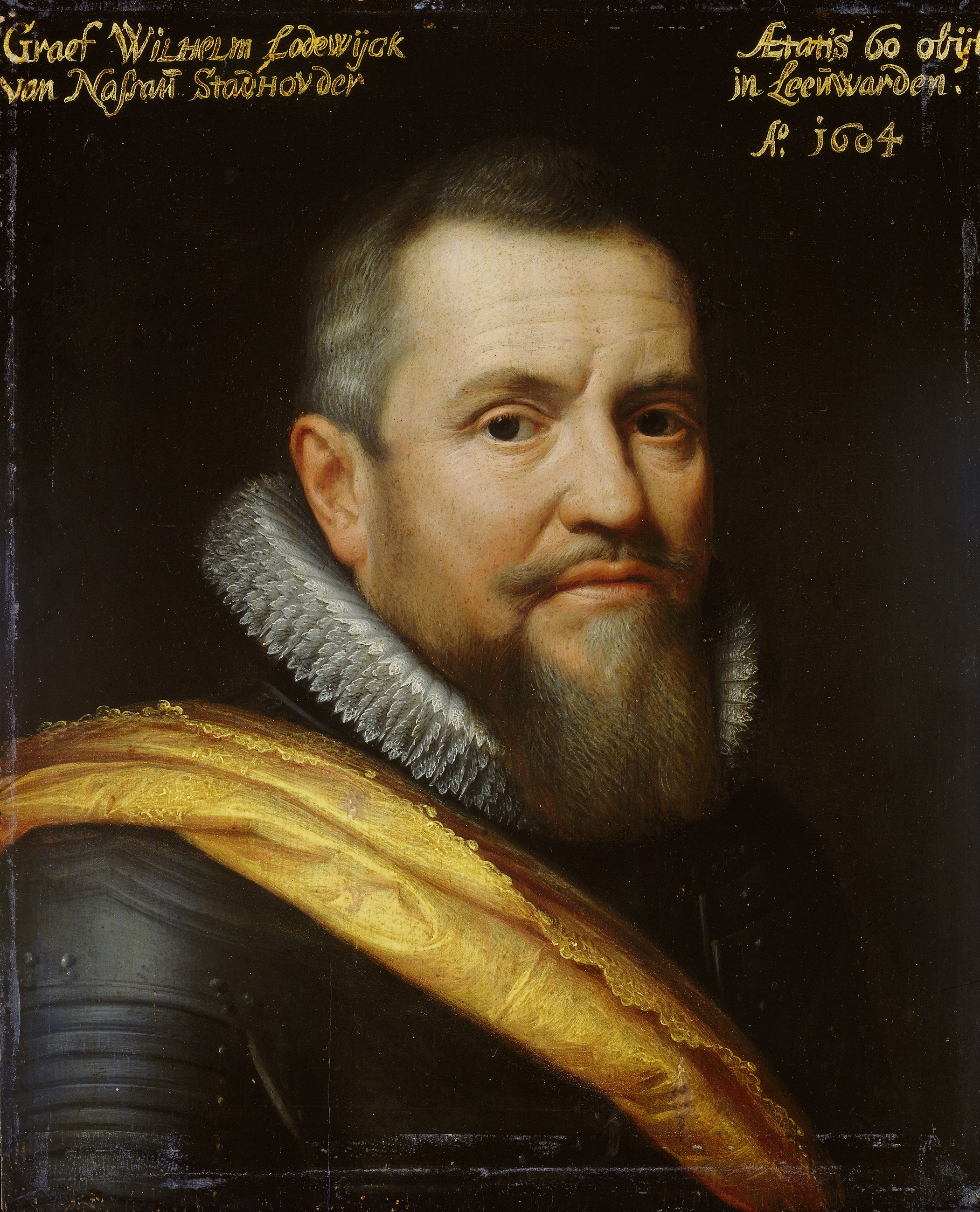
Studio of Michiel van Mierevelt, 1609

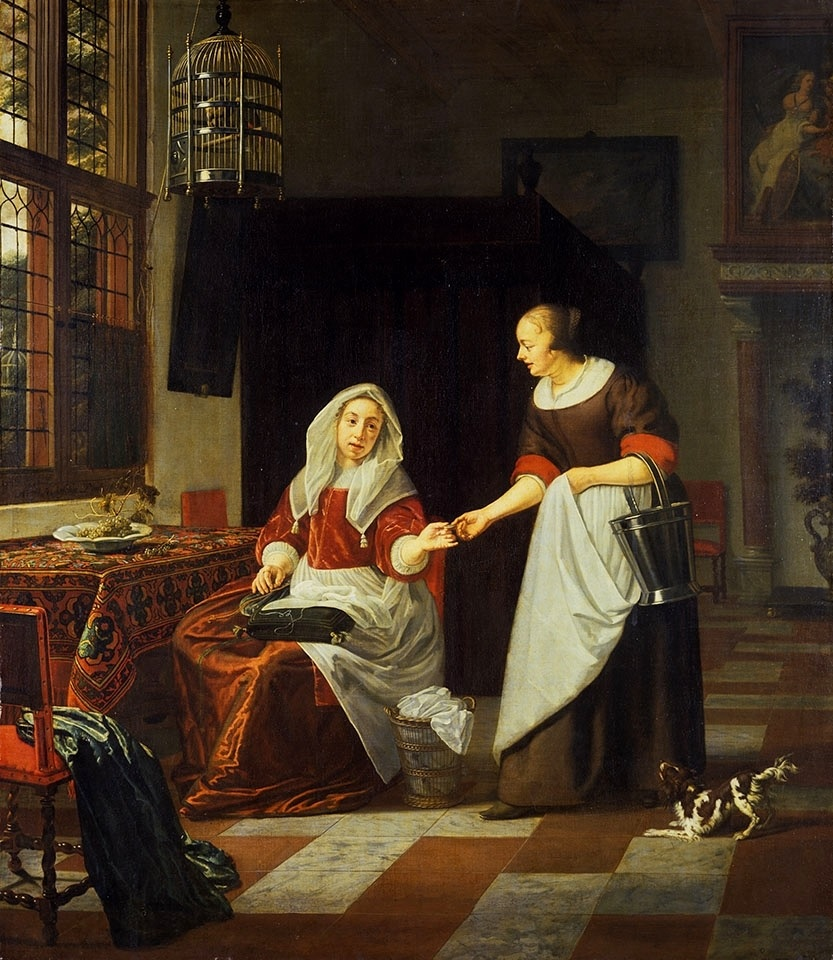
Michiel van Musscher, 1669

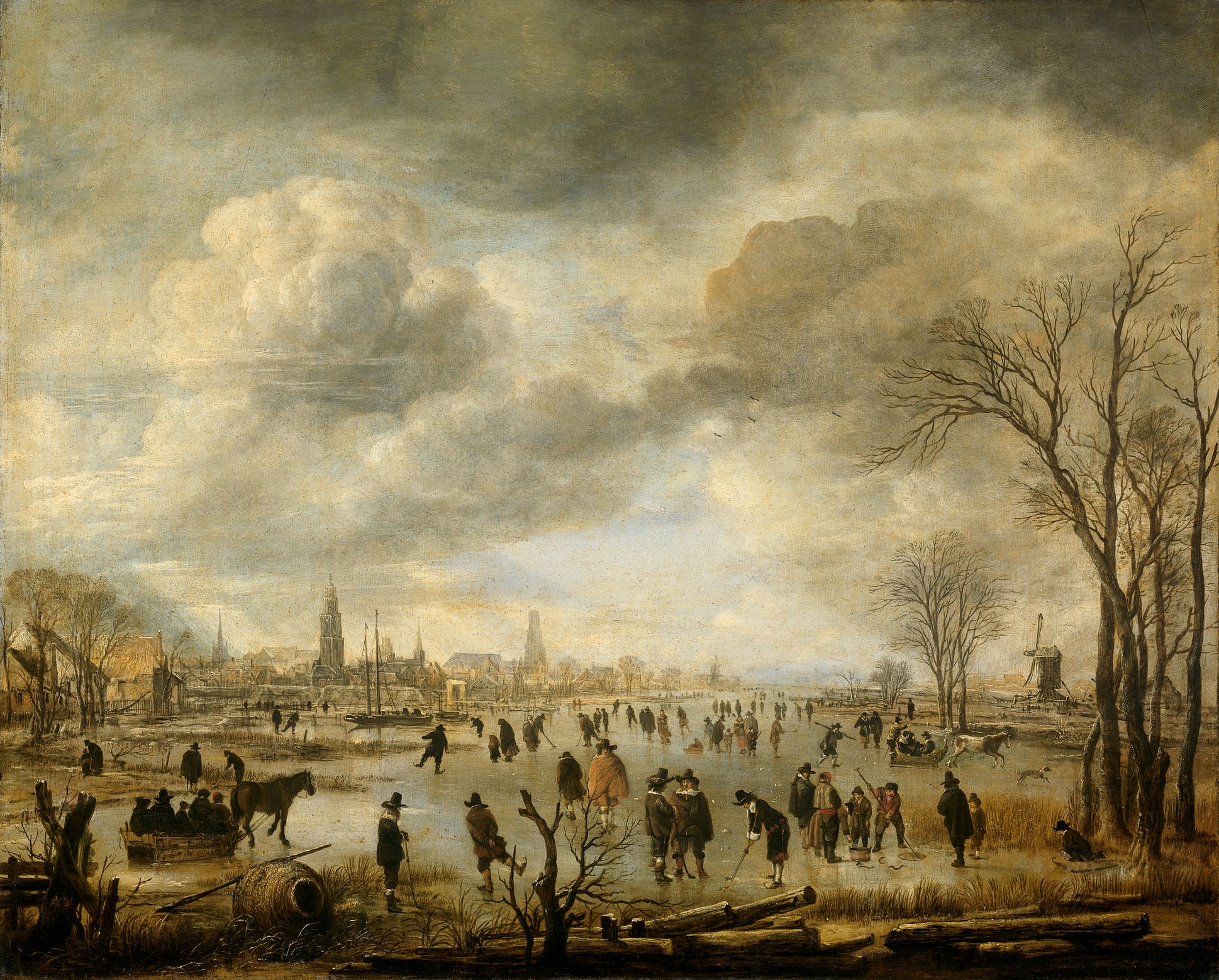
Aert van der Neer, c. 1650

- Maas, Dirk (Haarlem 1659 – Haarlem 1717)
- Maddersteeg, Dirk (Enkhuizen 1662 – Berlin 1708)
- Maes, Nicolaes (Dordrecht 1634 – Amsterdam 1693)
- Man, Cornelis de (Delft 1621 – Delft 1706)
- Mancadan, Jacob Sibrandi (Minnertsga 1602 – Tjerkgaast 1680)
- Mander, Karel van (II) (Kortrijk 1579/1580 – Delft 1623)
- Mander, Karel van (III) (Delft 1609 – Copenhagen 1670)
- Marienhof, Aert Jansz (Utrecht 1625/26 – Brussels aft. 1652)
- Marseus van Schrieck, Otto (Nijmegen 1619 – Amsterdam 1678)
- Martszen de Jonge, Jan (Haarlem 1609/10 – Haarlem 1647)
- Matham, Jacob (Haarlem 1571 – Haarlem 1631)
- Matham, Jan (Haarlem 1600 – Haarlem 1648)
- Meer, Barend van der (Haarlem 1659 – Amsterdam 1692/1702)
- Meer, Jan van der (Haarlem 1656 – Haarlem 1705)
- Meerhout, Jan (Gorinchem c. 1625 – Amsterdam 1677)
- Meijer, Hendrick de (Rotterdam c. 1620 – Rotterdam 1689/98)
- Merian, Maria Sibylla (Frankfurt 1647 – Amsterdam 1717)
- Mesdach, Salomon (fl. Middelburg 1600 – 1632)
- Metsu, Gabriel (Leiden 1629 – Amsterdam 1669)
- Meulen, Cornelis van der (Dordrecht 1642 – Stockholm 1691)
- Meyne, David de (Maastricht c. 1569 – Amsterdam c. 1620)
- Mierevelt, Michiel van (Delft 1566 – Delft 1641)
- Mieris, Frans van (I) (Leiden 1635 – Leiden 1681)
- Mieris, Jan van (Leiden 1660 – Rome 1690)
- Mignon, Abraham (Frankfurt 1640 – Utrecht 1679)
- Mijtens, Daniël (I) (Delft c. 1590 – The Hague 1647/48)
- Mijtens, Daniël (II) (The Hague 1644 – The Hague 1688)
- Mijtens, Johannes (The Hague c. 1614 – The Hague 1670)
- Mijtens, Martin (I) (The Hague 1648 – Stockholm 1736)
- Moeyaert, Claes Cornelisz (Durgerdam 1591 – Amsterdam 1655)
- Molenaer, Bartolomeus (Haarlem 1618 - Haarlem 1650)
- Molenaer, Jan Miense (Haarlem 1610 – Haarlem 1668)
- Molenaer, Klaes (Haarlem 1626/29 – Haarlem 1676)
- Molijn, Pieter de (London 1595 – Haarlem 1661)
- Mommers, Hendrick (Amsterdam 1620 – Amsterdam 1693)
- Moor, Carel de (Leiden 1655 – Warmond 1738)
- Moreelse, Johan (Utrecht c. 1600 – Utrecht 1634)
- Moreelse, Paulus (Utrecht 1571 – Utrecht 1638)
- Mosscher, Jacob van (fl. Haarlem 1635 – 1650)
- Moucheron, Frederik de (Emden 1633 – Amsterdam 1686)
- Mulier, Pieter (I) (Haarlem c. 1600 – Haarlem 1670)
- Mulier, Pieter (II) (Haarlem 1637 – Milan 1701)
- Muller, Jan Harmensz (Amsterdam 1571 – Amsterdam 1628)
- Murant, Emanuel (Amsterdam 1622 – Leeuwarden aft. 1692)
- Musscher, Michiel van (Rotterdam 1645 – Amsterdam 1705)

=== N ===
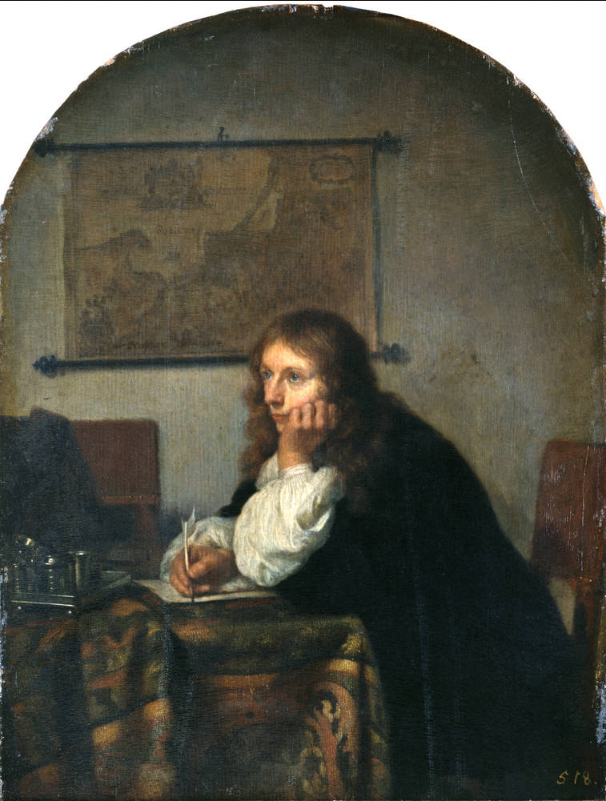
Caspar Netscher, 1665

- Naiveu, Matthijs (Leiden 1647 – Amsterdam 1726)
- Naiwincx, Herman (Schoonhoven 1623 – Hamburg 1651/55)
- Nason, Pieter (Amsterdam 1612 – The Hague 1688/90)
- Neck, Jan van (Naarden 1634/35 – Amsterdam 1714)
- Neer, Aert van der (Gorinchem 1603/04 – Amsterdam 1677)
- Neer, Eglon van der (Amsterdam 1635/36 – Düsseldorf 1703)
- Netscher, Caspar (Heidelberg or Prague c. 1636 – The Hague 1684)
- Neyn, Pieter de (Leiden 1597 – Leiden 1639)
- Nieulandt, Adriaen van (Antwerp 1586/87 – Amsterdam 1658)
- Nieulandt, Willem van (II) (Antwerp 1583/84 – Amsterdam 1635)
- Nooms, Reinier (Amsterdam 1623/24 – Amsterdam 1664)
- Noordt, Jan van (Schagen 1623/24 – aft. 1676)
- Noort, Pieter van (Leiden 1623 – Zwolle 1672)

=== O ===
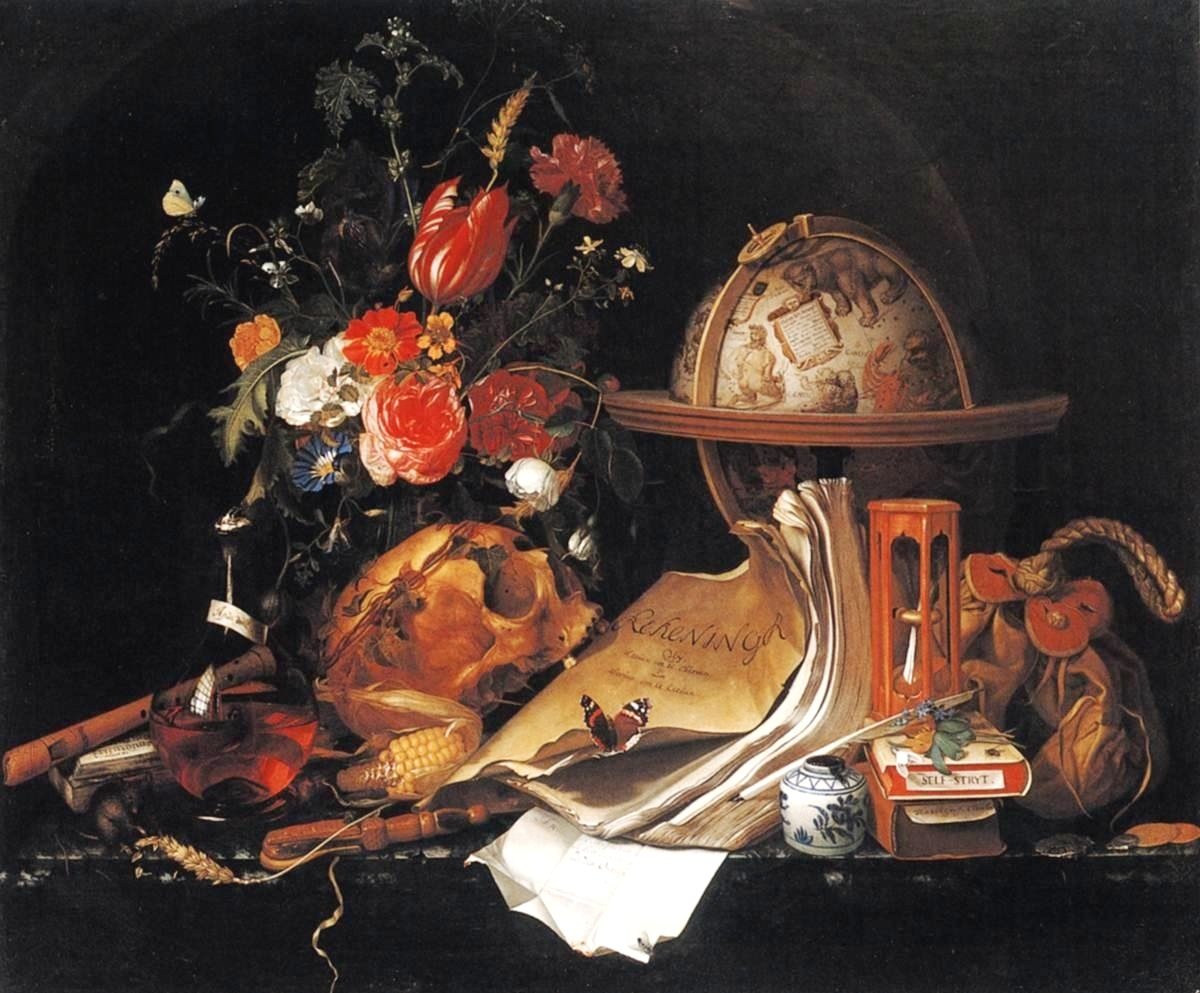
Maria van Oosterwijck, 1668

- Ochtervelt, Jacob (Rotterdam 1634 – Amsterdam 1682)
- Oever, Hendrik ten (Zwolle 1639 – Zwolle 1716)
- Olis, Jan (Gorinchem c. 1610 – Heusden 1676)
- Oosterwijck, Maria van (Nootdorp 1630 – Uitdam 1693)
- Oostvries, Catharina (Nieuwkoop 1636/38 – Alkmaar 1708)
- Ostade, Adriaen van (Haarlem 1610 – Haarlem 1685)
- Ostade, Isaac van (Haarlem 1621 – Haarlem 1649)
- Ovens, Jurriaen (Taning 1623 – Frederiksstad 1678)

=== P–Q ===
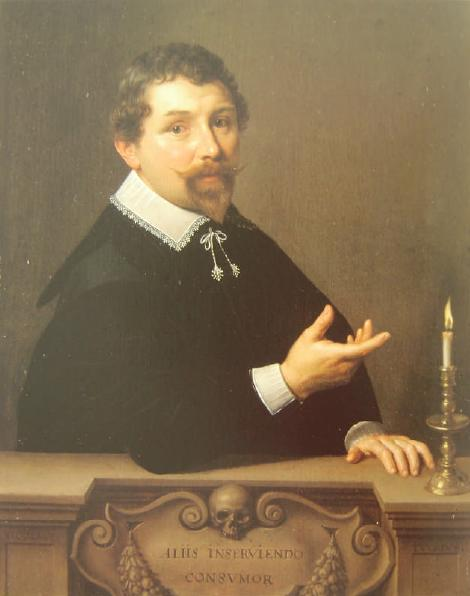
Nicolaes Eliasz Pickenoy, 1633

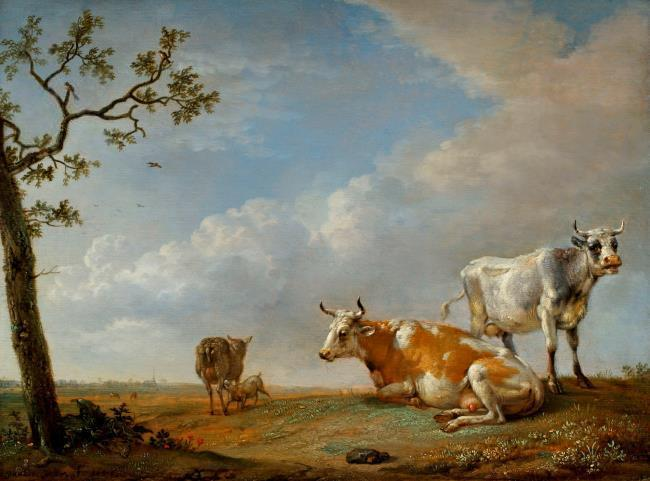
Paulus Potter, 1650

- Palamedesz, Anthonie (Leith 1602 – Amsterdam 1673)
- Palamedesz, Palamedes (Leith 1605 – Delft 1638)
- Peschier, N.L. (Ardèche bef. 1640 – Leiden? aft. 1661)
- Pickenoy, Nicolaes Eliaszoon (Amsterdam 1588 – Amsterdam 1650/56)
- Pierson, Christoffel (The Hague 1631 – Gouda 1714
- Pijnacker, Adam (Schiedam 1622 – Amsterdam 1673)
- Plas, David van der (Amsterdam 1647 – Amsterdam 1704)
- Pluym, Karel van der (Leiden 1625 – Leiden 1672)
- Poel, Egbert Lievensz van der (Delft 1621 – Rotterdam 1664)
- Poelenburch, Cornelis van (Utrecht 1594 – Utrecht 1667)
- Poorter, Willem de (Haarlem 1608 – Haarlem? aft. 1648)
- Porcellis, Jan (Ghent 1584 – Zoeterwoude 1632)
- Porcellis, Julius (Rotterdam c. 1610 – Leiden 1645)
- Post, Frans Jansz (Haarlem 1612 – Haarlem 1680)
- Post, Pieter Jansz (Haarlem 1608 – The Hague 1669)
- Pot, Hendrik Gerritsz (Amsterdam c. 1580 – Amsterdam 1657)
- Potter, Paulus (Enkhuizen 1625 – Amsterdam 1654)
- Potter, Pieter Symonsz (Enkhuizen 1597/1600 – Amsterdam 1652)
- Pynas, Jacob Symonsz (Haarlem or Amsterdam 1592/93 – Delft c. 1650)
- Pynas, Jan Symonsz (Alkmaar 1581 – Amsterdam 1631)
- Quast, Pieter Jansz (Amsterdam 1605/06 – Amsterdam 1647)

=== R ===
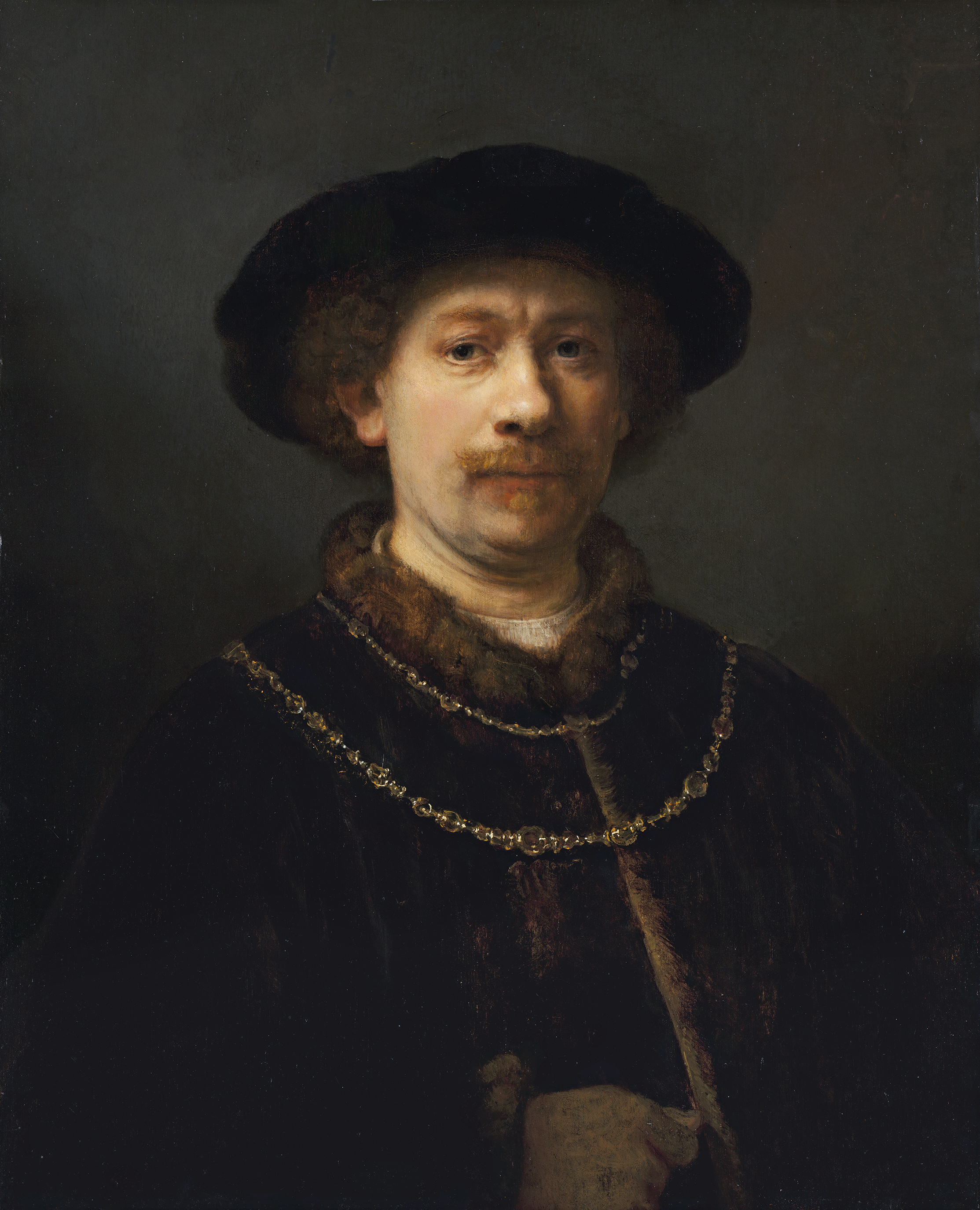
Rembrandt, 1640s

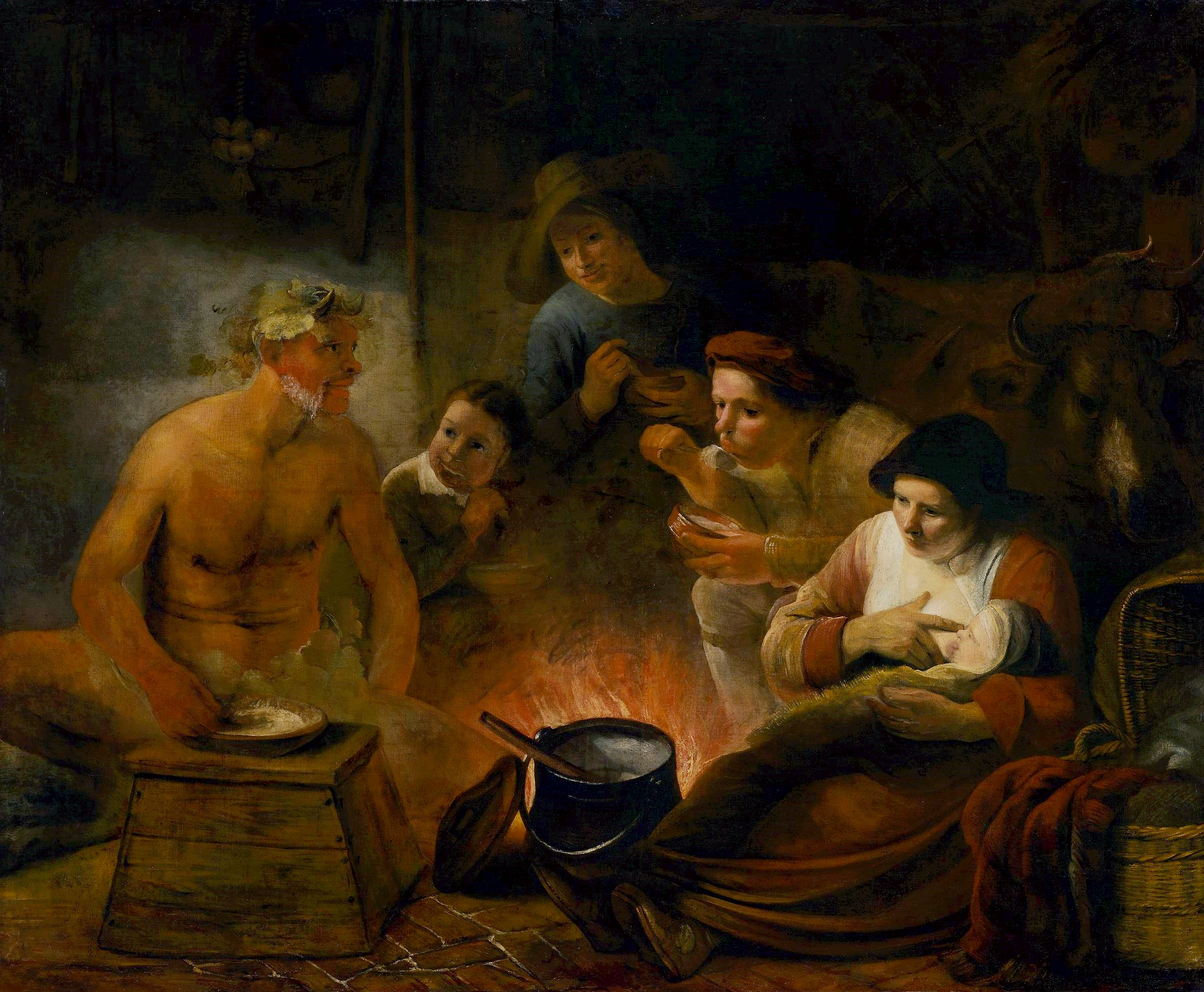
Constantijn à Renesse, 1653

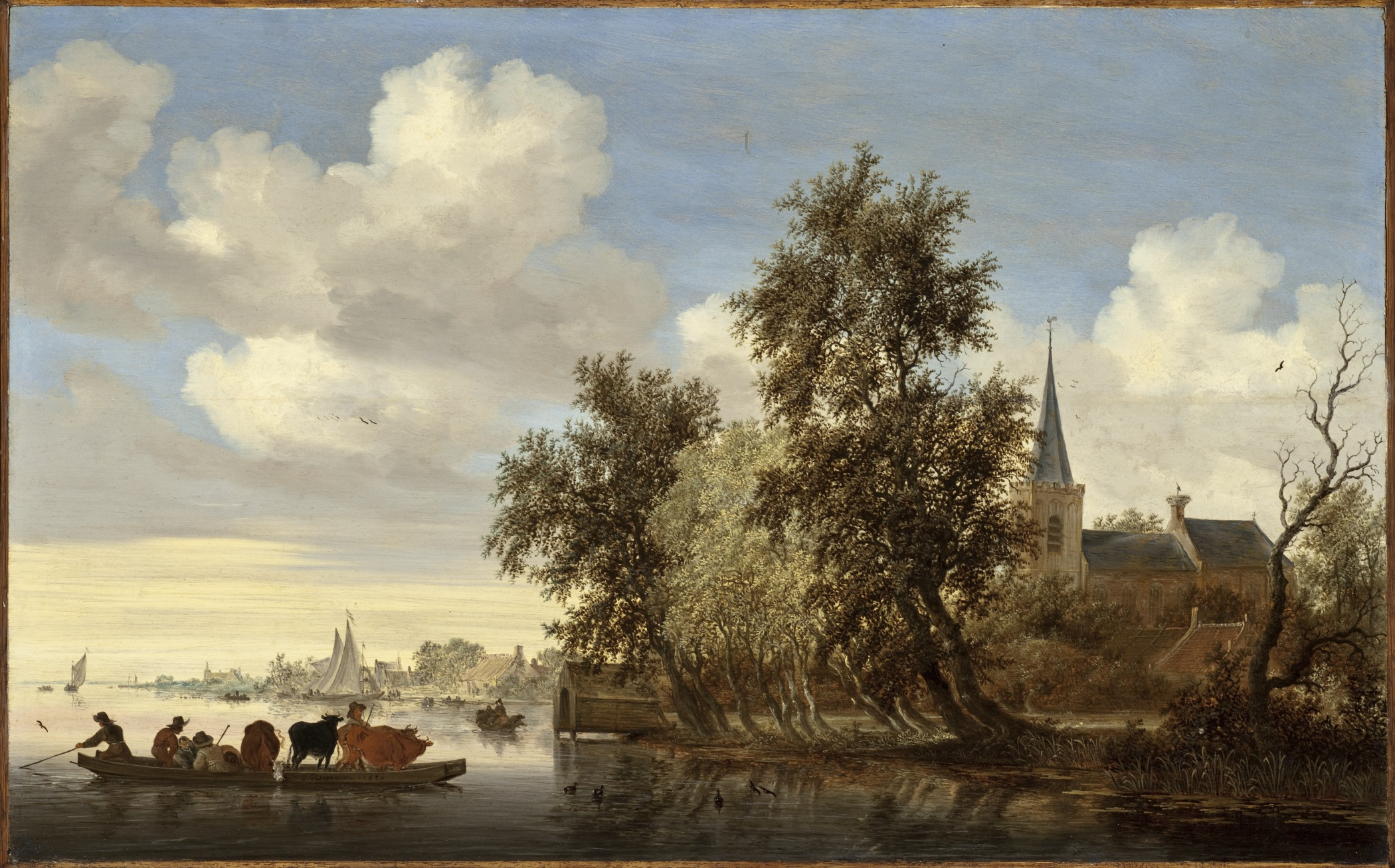
Salomon van Ruysdael, 1650

- Ravesteyn, Arnold van (The Hague c. 1605 – The Hague 1690)
- Ravesteyn, Hubert van (Dordrecht 1638 – Dordrecht 1683/91)
- Ravesteyn, Jan van (The Hague c. 1572 – The Hague 1657)
- Van Rijn, Rembrandt (Leiden 1606 – Amsterdam 1669)
- Renesse, Constantijn à (Maarssen 1626 – Eindhoven 1680)
- Rietschoof, Jan Claesz (Hoorn 1652 – Hoorn 1719)
- Rijck, Pieter Cornelisz van (Delft 1567/68 – Italy aft. 1635
- Ring, Pieter de (Ypres c. 1615 – Leiden 1660)
- Roestraten, Pieter Gerritsz van (Haarlem 1630 London 1700)
- Roghman, Roelant (Amsterdam 1627 – Amsterdam 1692)
- Rombouts, Gillis (Haarlem 1631 – Haarlem 1672)
- Rombouts, Salomon (Haarlem 1655 – Florence? 1690/1702)
- Romeyn, Willem (Haarlem c. 1624 – Haarlem 1694)
- Rotius, Jacob (Hoorn 1644 – Hoorn 1681/82)
- Rotius, Jan Albertsz (Medemblik 1624 – Hoorn 1666)
- Royen, Willem Frederiksz van (Haarlem c. 1645 – Berlin 1723)
- Ruisdael, Isaack van (Naarden 1599 – Haarlem 1677)
- Ruisdael, Jacob van (Haarlem 1629 – Haarlem 1682)
- Ruysch, Anna (The Hague 1666 – Amsterdam 1741)
- Ruysch, Rachel (The Hague 1664 – Amsterdam 1750)
- Ruysdael, Salomon van (Naarden 1600/03 – Haarlem 1670)

=== S ===
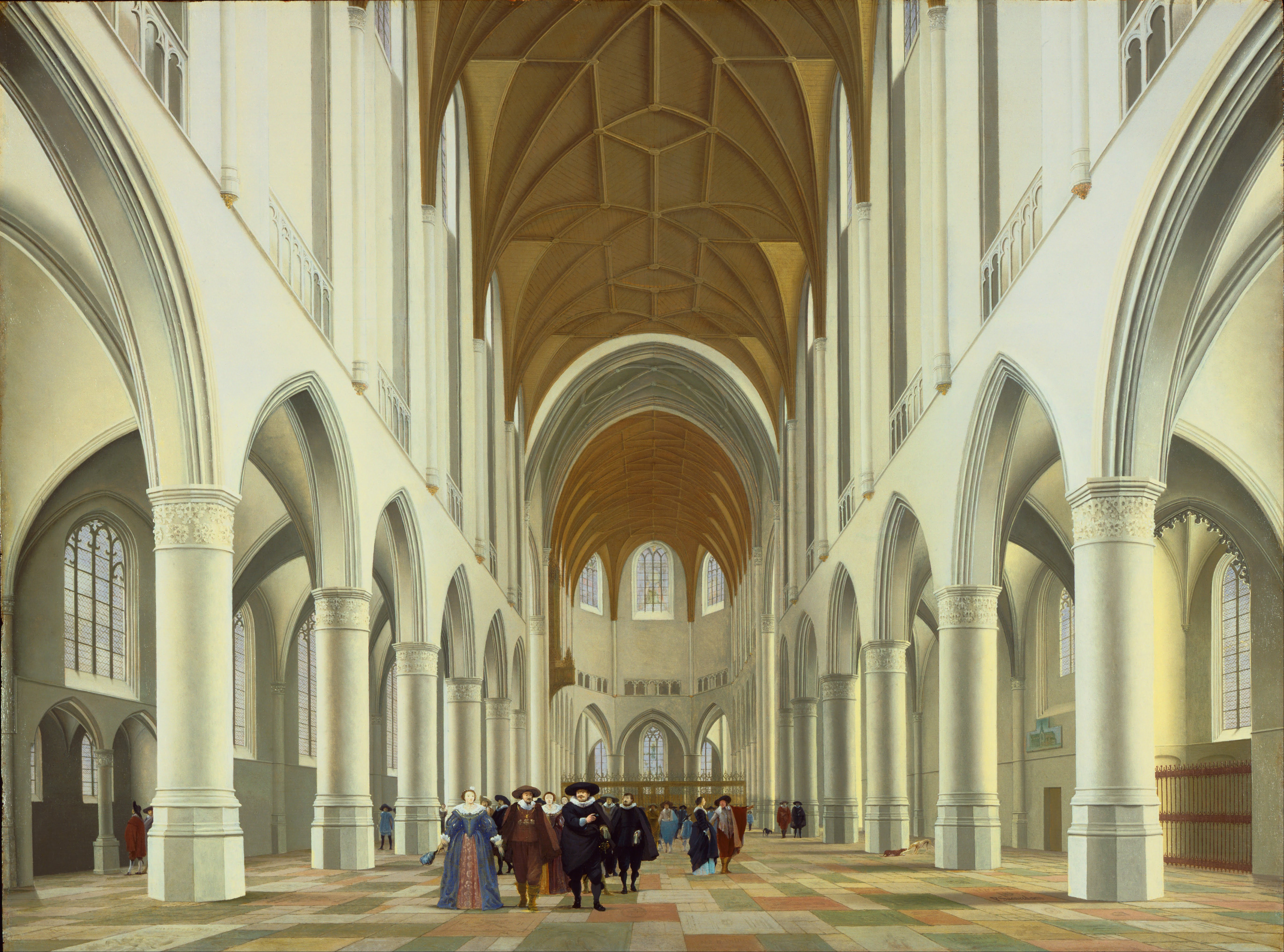
Pieter Jansz Saenredam, 1631

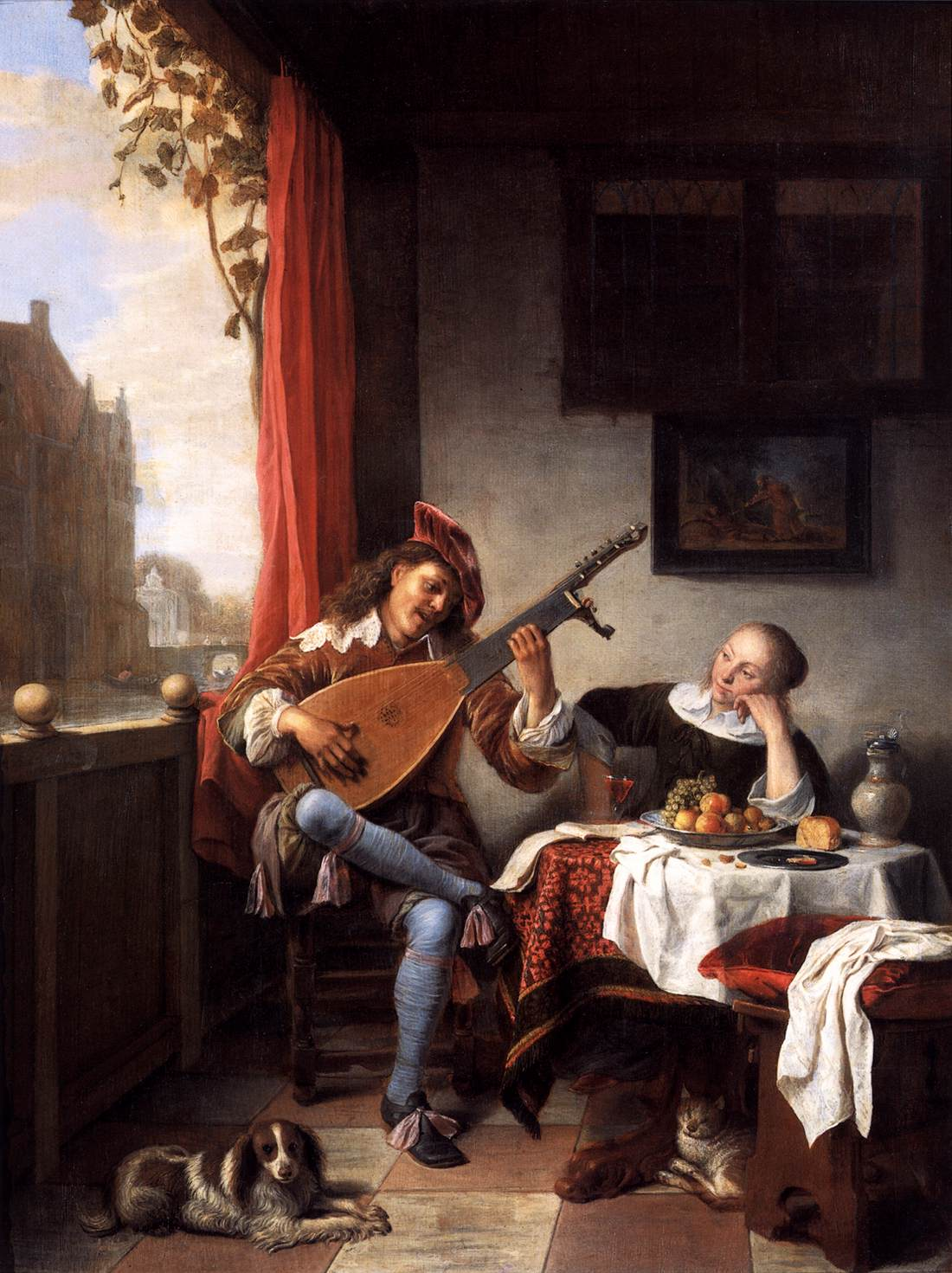
Hendrick Martensz Sorgh, 1661

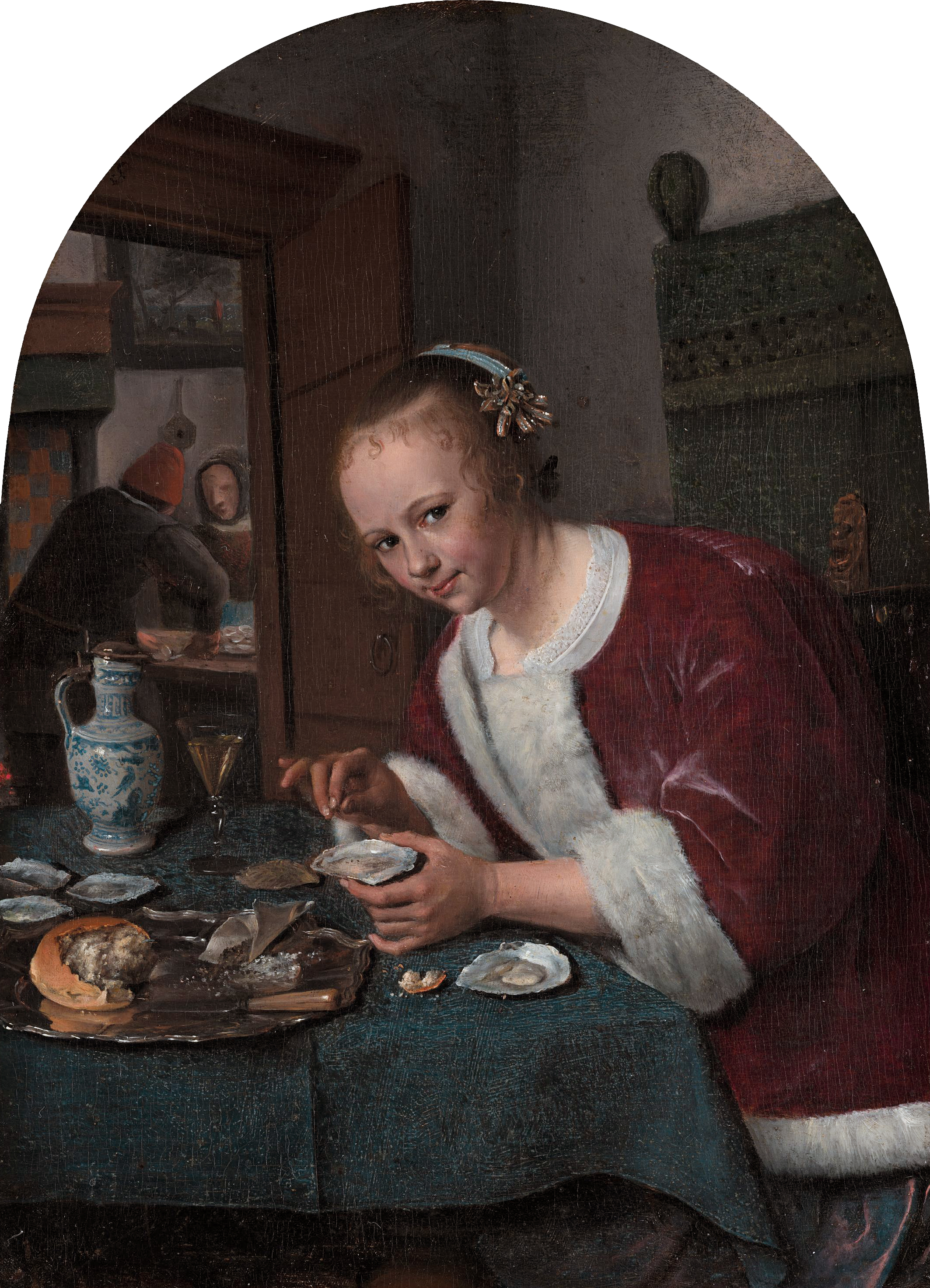
Jan Steen, c. 1665

- Saenredam, Pieter Jansz (Assendelft 1597 – Haarlem 1665)
- Saftleven, Cornelis (Gorinchem 1607 – Rotterdam 1681)
- Saftleven, Herman (Rotterdam c. 1609 – Utrecht 1685)
- Sailmaker, Isaac (Scheveningen 1633 – London 1721)
- Salm, Adriaen van (Delfshaven c. 1660 – Delfshaven 1720)
- Santvoort, Dirck Dircksz van (Amsterdam 1609 – Amsterdam 1680)
- Savery, Roelant (Kortrijk 1576 – Utrecht 1639)
- Schaeyenborgh, Pieter van (Antwerp 1600 – Alkmaar 1657)
- Schalcken, Godfried (Made 1643 – The Hague 1706)
- Schalcken, Maria (Dordrecht 1645 – Dordrecht 1699)
- Schellinks, Willem (Amsterdam 1623 – Amsterdam 1678)
- Schooten, Floris van (Schoten? 1585/88 – Haarlem 1656)
- Schooten, Joris van (Leiden c. 1587 – Leiden 1651)
- Schrieck, Otto Marseus van (Nijmegen 1619 – Amsterdam 1678)
- Schuer, Theodor van der (The Hague 1634 – The Hague 1707)
- Schurman, Anna Maria van (Cologne 1607 – Wieuwerd 1678)
- Seghers, Hercules (Haarlem 1589/90 – The Hague 1638)
- Slingeland, Cornelis van (Dordrecht c. 1635 – Dordrecht 1686)
- Slingelandt, Pieter Cornelisz van (Leiden 1640 – Leiden 1691)
- Smit, Abraham (Lokeren c. 1621 – Amsterdam 1672)
- Snellinck, Cornelis (Rotterdam or Antwerp c. 1605 – Rotterdam 1669)
- Soest, Gerard (Soest 1600 – London 1681)
- Soest, Pieter Cornelisz van (fl. Amsterdam 1642–1667)
- Sorgh, Hendrick Martensz (Rotterdam 1610/11 – Rotterdam 1670)
- Soutman, Pieter (Haarlem 1593/1601 – Haarlem 1657)
- Spelt, Adriaen van der (Leiden 1630/31 – Gouda 1673)
- Spilberg, Adriana (Amsterdam 1652 – Düsseldorf 1700)
- Staveren, Jan Adriaensz van (Leiden 1613/14 – Leiden 1669)
- Steen, Jan Havicksz (Leiden 1626 – Leiden 1679)
- Steenwijck, Harmen (Delft c. 1612 – Delft? aft. 1656)
- Steenwijck, Pieter (Delft c. 1615 – aft. 1656)
- Steenwijck, Hendrik II van (Antwerp 1580 – The Hague 1649)
- Steenwijck, Susanna van (London aft. 1602 – Amsterdam 1664)
- Stom, Matthias (Amersfoort 1600 – Sicilia aft. 1652)
- Stoop, Dirck (Utrecht c. 1618 – Utrecht or Hamburg aft. 1681)
- Storck, Abraham (Amsterdam 1644 – Amsterdam 1708)
- Storck, Jacobus (Amsterdam 1641 – Amsterdam 1692)
- Streeck, Hendrick van (Amsterdam 1659 – Amsterdam 1720)
- Streeck, Juriaen Hendricksz van (Amsterdam 1632 – Amsterdam 1687)
- Striep, Christiaen (Den Bosch 1634 – Amsterdam 1673)
- Stuven, Ernst (Hamburg c. 1657 – Rotterdam 1712)
- Susenier, Abraham (Leiden c. 1620 – Dordrecht 1672)
- Swanenburg, Jacob Isaacsz van (Leiden 1571 – Utrecht 1638)
- Swanevelt, Herman van (Woerden 1603 – Paris 1655)

=== T–U ===
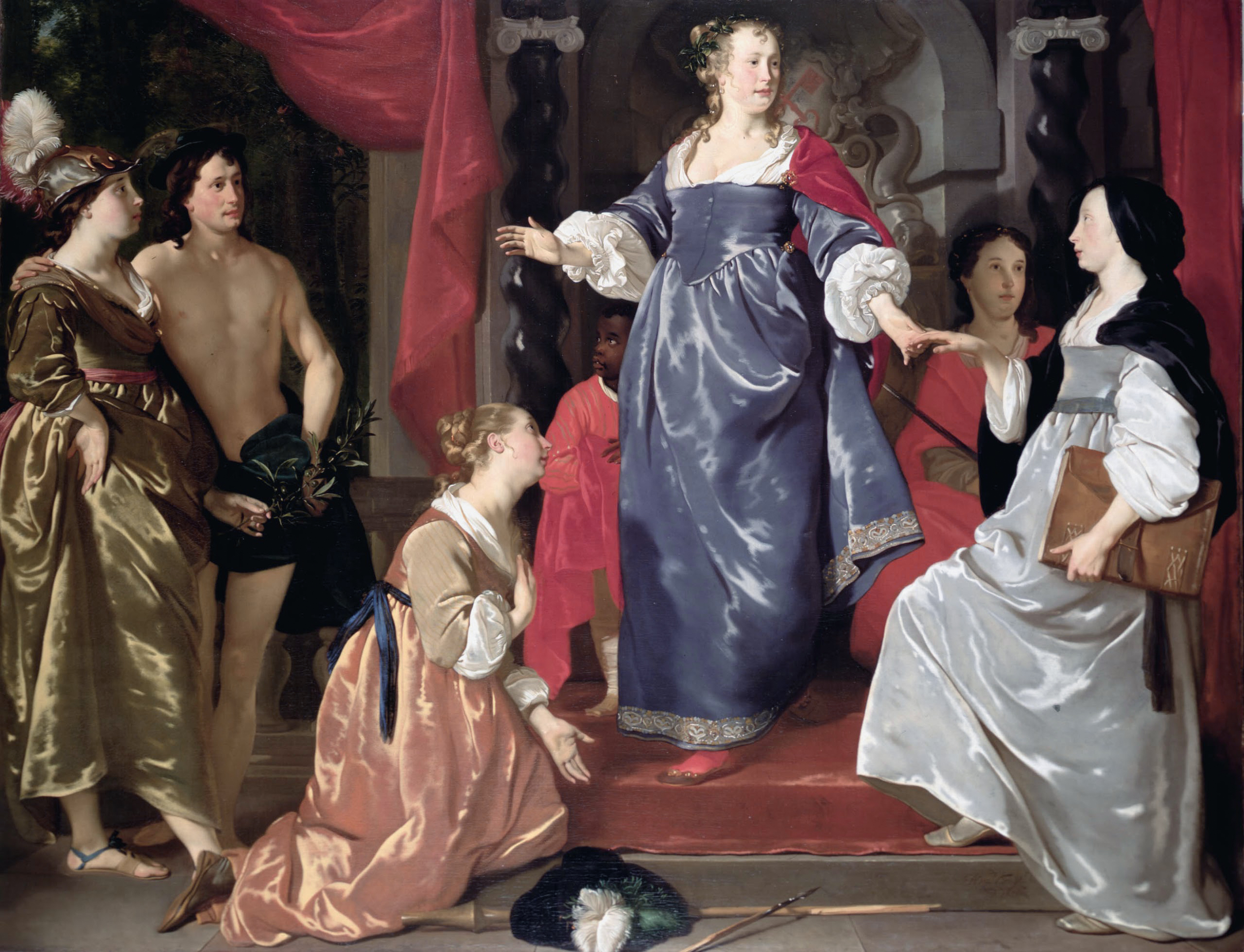
Abraham van den Tempel, 1651

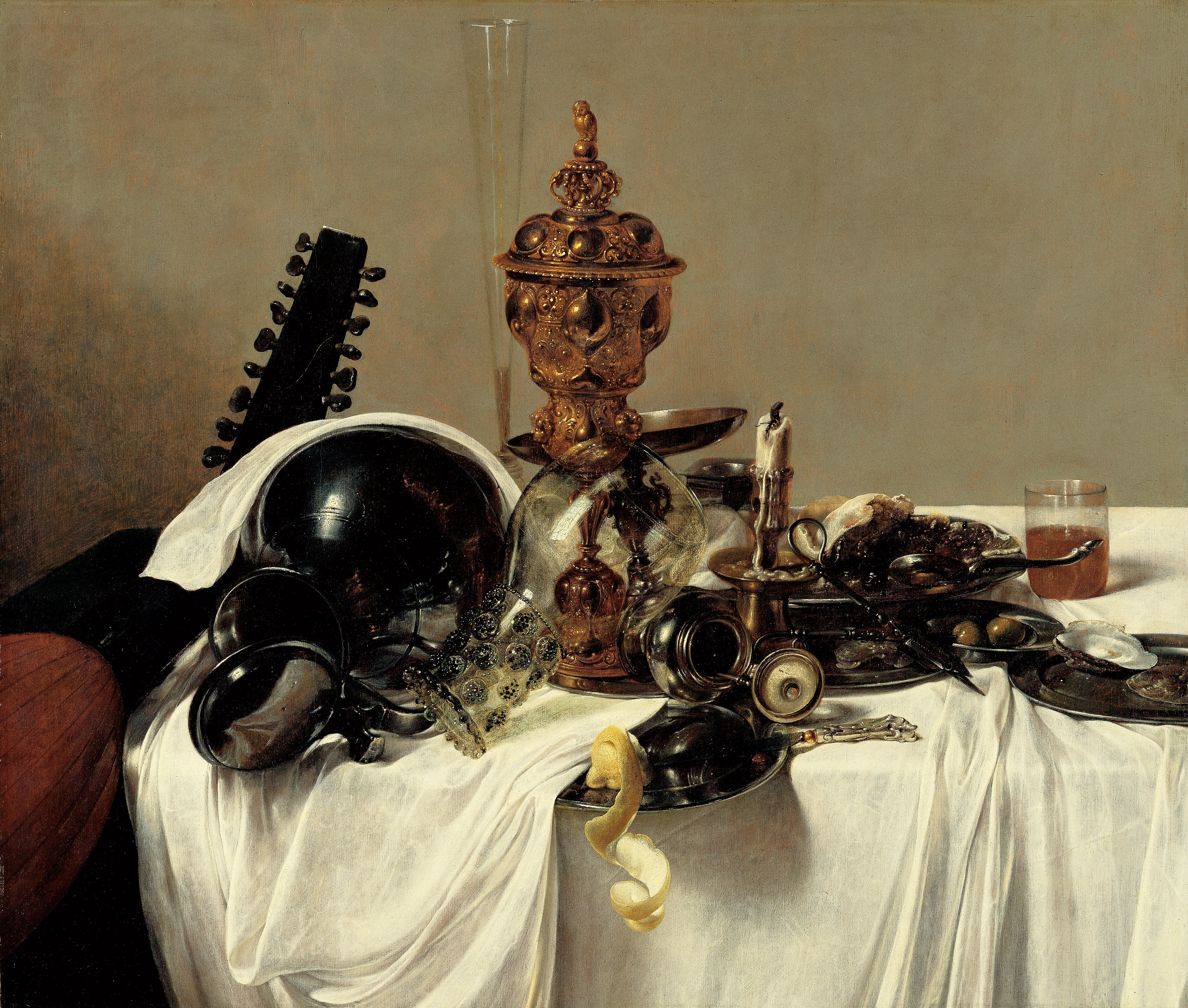
Jan den Uyl, c. 1635

- Tempel, Abraham van den (Leeuwarden 1622 – Amsterdam 1672)
- Tengnagel, Jan (Amsterdam 1584 – Amsterdam 1635)
- Terborch, Gerard (II) (Zwolle 1617 – Deventer 1681)
- Terbrugghen, Hendrick (Utrecht 1588 – Utrecht 1629)
- Terwesten, Augustinus (The Hague 1649 – Berlin 1711)
- Teyler, Johan (Nijmegen 1648 – Nijmegen, c. 1709)
- Thopas, Jan (Arnhem 1625/27 – Assendelft or Westzaandam 1688/95)
- Thulden, Theodoor van (Den Bosch 1606 – Den Bosch 1669)
- Tol, Domenicus van (Bodegraven c. 1635 – Leiden 1676)
- Toorenvliet, Jacob (Leiden 1640 – Oegstgeest 1719)
- Torrentius, Johannes (Amsterdam 1589 – Amsterdam 1644)
- Treck, Jan (Amsterdam 1605/06 – Amsterdam 1652)
- Troyen, Rombout van (Amsterdam 1605 – Amsterdam aft. 1657)
- Ulft, Jacob van der (Gorinchem 1627 – Noordwijk 1690)
- Uyl, Jan den (Kampen? 1596 – Amsterdam 1639)
- Uyttenbroeck, Moses van (The Hague c. 1595 – The Hague 1647)

=== V ===
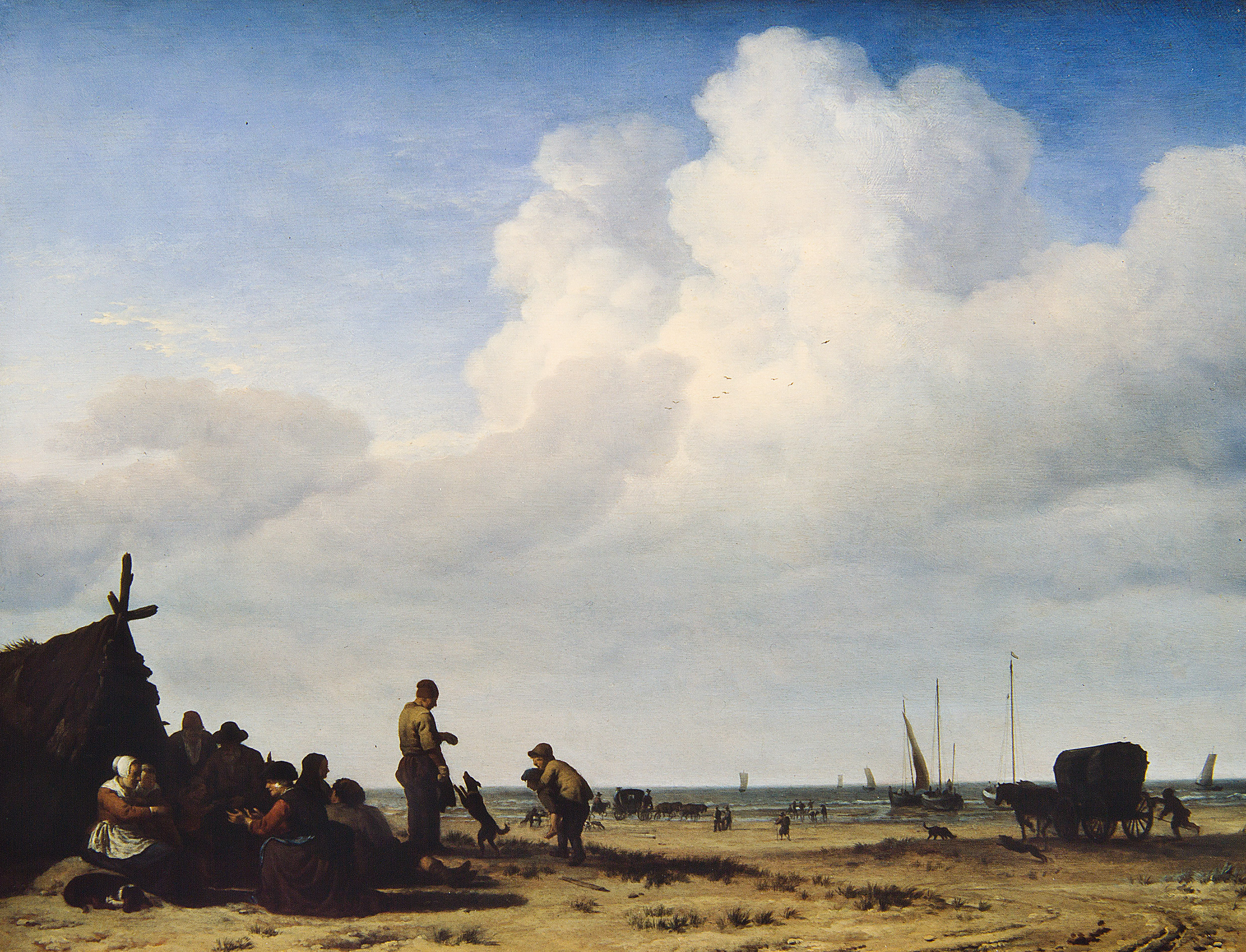
Adriaen van de Velde. 1664

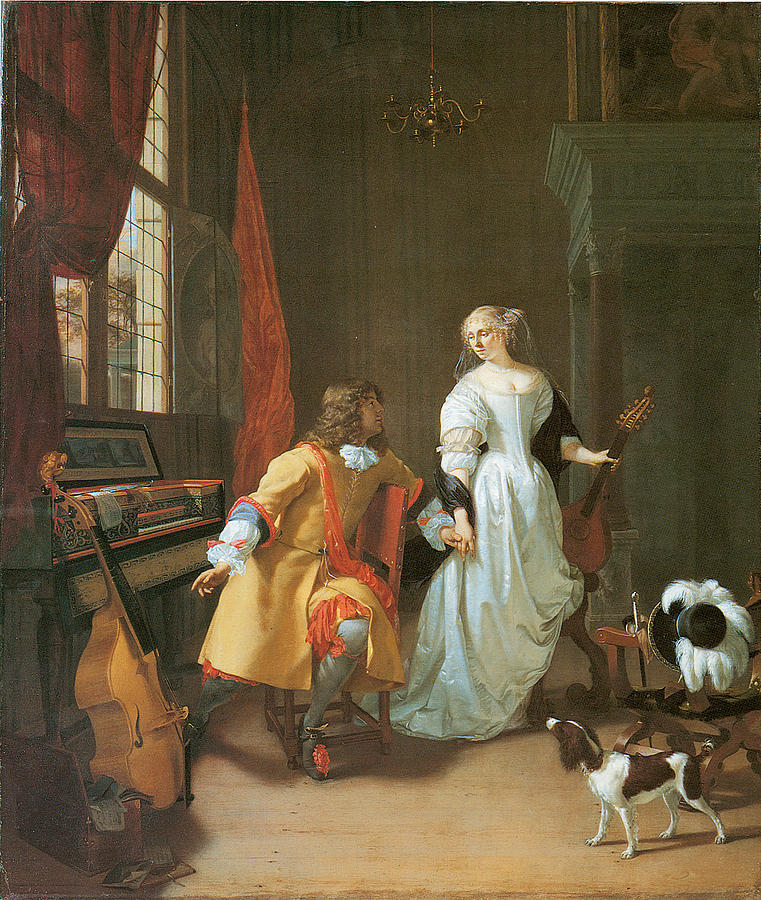
Jan Verkolje, 1674

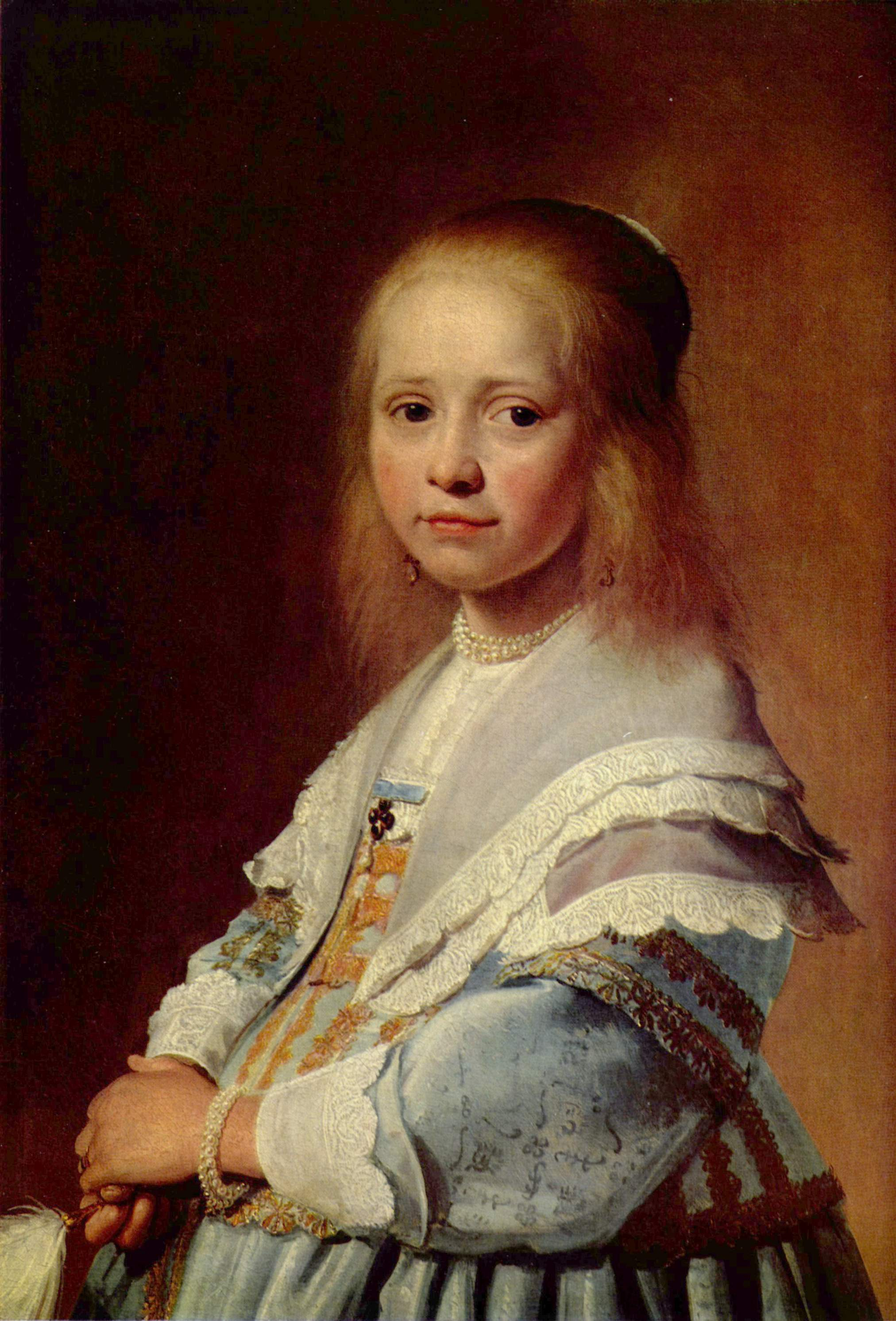
Jan Cornelisz Verspronck, 1641

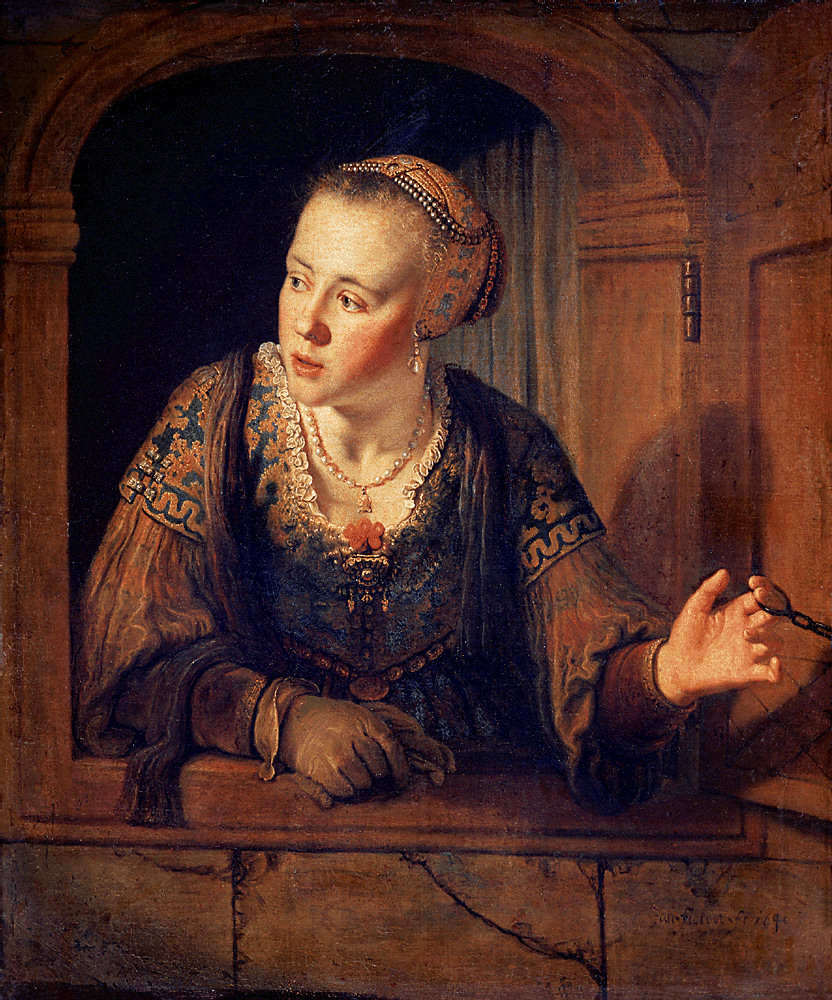
Jan Victors, 1640

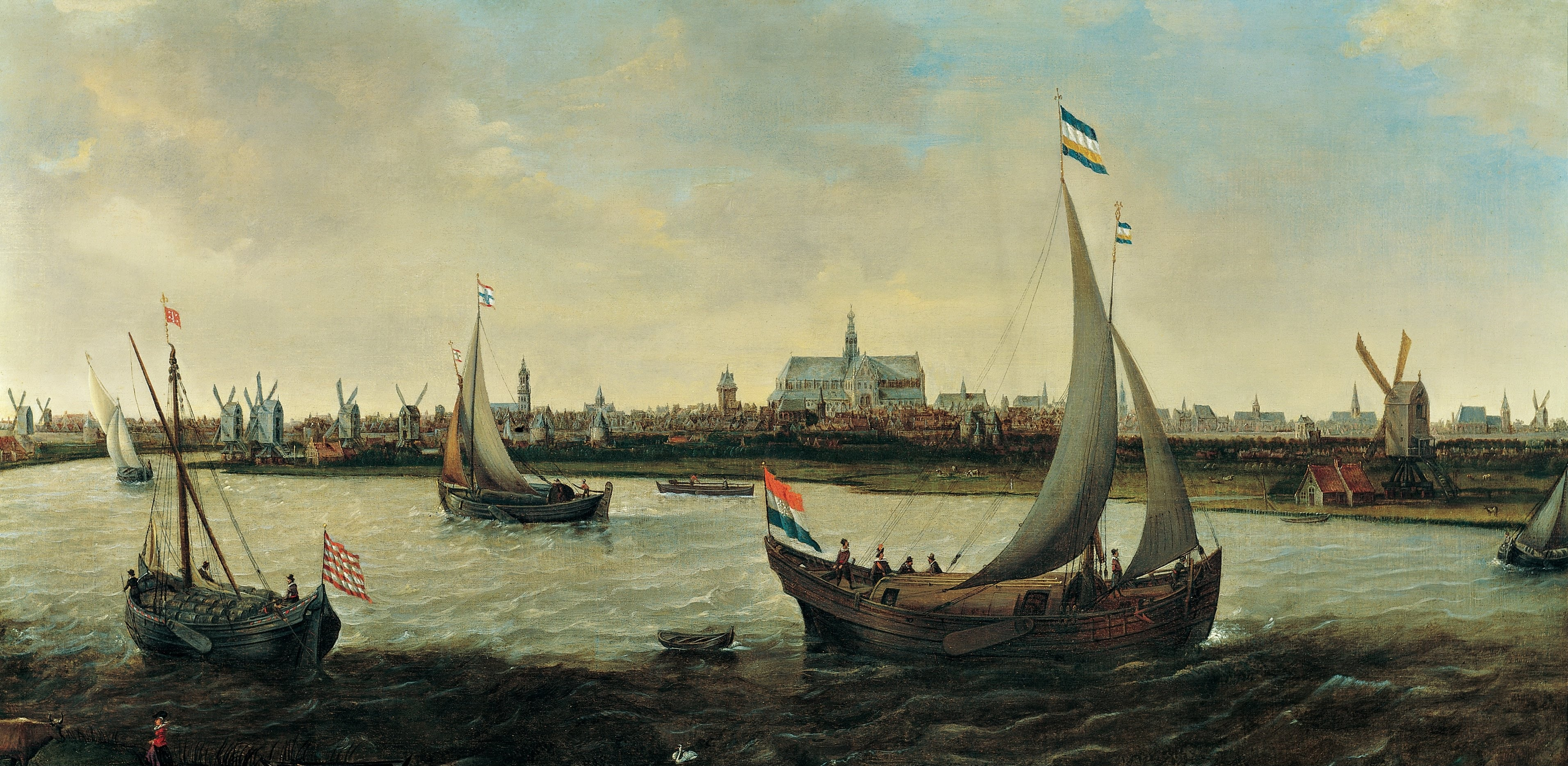
Hendrik Cornelisz Vroom, 1625

- Vaillant, Bernard (Lille 1632 – Leiden 1677)
- Vaillant, Jacques (Amsterdam 1643 – Berlin 1691)
- Vaillant, Wallerant (Lille 1623 – Amsterdam 1677)
- Valckert, Werner van den (The Hague? c. 1580 – Delft? 1644?)
- Veen, Otto van (Leiden 1556 – Brussels 1629)
- Velde, Adriaen van de (Amsterdam 1636 – Amsterdam 1672)
- Velde, Esaias van de (Amsterdam 1587 – The Hague 1630)
- Velde, Jan (II) van de (Rotterdam or Delft 1593 – Enkhuizen 1641)
- Velde, Jan Jansz (III) van de (Haarlem 1620 – Enkhuizen 1662)
- Velde, Willem (I) van de (Leiden 1611 – Greenwich 1693)
- Velde, Willem (II) van de (Leiden 1633 – London 1707)
- Velsen, Jacob Jansz van (Delft c. 1597 – Amsterdam 1656)
- Venne, Adriaen van de (Delft c. 1588 – The Hague 1662)
- Verbeeck, Cornelis (Amsterdam? 1585/92 – Haarlem aft. 1637)
- Verbeeck, Pieter Cornelisz (Haarlem c. 1600 - Haarlem c. 1653)
- Verboom, Adriaen Hendriksz (Rotterdam 1627 – Rotterdam 1673)
- Verelst, Herman (Rotterdam 1641 – London 1699)
- Verelst, Lodvick (Amsterdam 1668 - Stourbridge 1704)
- Verelst, Pieter Hermansz (Dordrecht c. 1618 – England 1668)
- Verelst, Simon Pietersz (The Hague 1644 – London c. 1718)
- Verelst, William (The Hague 1751 - London 1702)
- Verkolje, Jan (Amsterdam 1650 – Delft 1693)
- Vermeer, Johannes (Delft 1632 – Delft 1675)
- Vermeer van Haarlem, Jan (I) (Haarlem 1628 – Haarlem 1691)
- Vermeer van Haarlem, Jan (II) (Haarlem 1656 – Haarlem 1705)
- Vermeer van Utrecht (Schipluiden 1630 – Vreeswijk 1695/97)
- Verschuier, Lieve (Rotterdam 1627 – Rotterdam 1686)
- Verschuring, Hendrick (Gorinchem 1627 – Dordrecht 1690)
- Verspronck, Johannes Cornelisz (Haarlem 1600/03 – Haarlem 1662)
- Verstraelen, Anthonie (Gorinchem 1594 – Amsterdam 1641)
- Vertangen, Daniel (The Hague c. 1630 – Amsterdam 1681)
- Verwer, Abraham de (Haarlem c. 1585 – Amsterdam 1650)
- Verwer, Justus de (Amsterdam 1625 – Amsterdam 1689)
- Verwilt, François (Rotterdam 1620/23 – Rotterdam 1691)
- Verzijl, Jan Franse (Gouda 1602/03 – Gouda 1647)
- Veth, Jan Damesz de (Gouda c. 1595 – Gouda 1625)
- Victors, Jan (Amsterdam 1619 – Java or Moluccas 1676)
- Vinckboons, David (Mechelen 1576 – Amsterdam 1631/32)
- Vingboons, Johannes (Amsterdam 1616/17 – Amsterdam 1670)
- Vinne, Vincent van der (Haarlem 1628 – Haarlem 1702)
- Visscher, Cornelis (Haarlem 1628 – Amsterdam 1658)
- Vlieger, Simon de (Rotterdam 1600/1 – Weesp 1653)
- Vliet, Hendrick Cornelisz van (Delft 1611/12 – Delft 1675)
- Vliet, Willem van der (Delft c. 1584 – Delft 1642)
- Vogelaer, Carel de (Maastricht 1653 – Rome 1695)
- Vois, Ary de (Utrecht 1632/34 – Leiden 1680)
- Vonck, Elias (Amsterdam c. 1605 – Amsterdam 1652)
- Vonck, Jan (Toruń 1631 – Amsterdam 1664)
- Voorhout, Johannes (Uithoorn 1647 – Amsterdam 1717)
- Voort, Cornelis van der (Antwerp 1576 – Amsterdam 1624)
- Vos, Cornelis de (Hulst 1584 – Antwerp 1651)
- Voskuijl, Huijgh Pietersz (Amsterdam 1591 – Amsterdam 1665)
- Vosmaer, Daniël (Delft 1622 – Den Briel 1666/70)
- Vosmaer, Jacob (Delft c. 1580 – Delft 1641)
- Vrel, Jacob (fl. Delft and Haarlem 1654–1662)
- Vries, Abraham de (The Hague c. 1590 – The Hague 1649/50)
- Vries, Roelof Jansz van (Haarlem 1630/31 – Amsterdam aft. 1681)
- Vrije, Adriaan Gerritsz de (Gouda c. 1570 – Gouda 1643)
- Vroom, Cornelis Hendriksz (Haarlem or Danzig 1590/91 – Haarlem 1661)
- Vroom, Hendrik Cornelisz (Haarlem 1562/63 – Haarlem 1640)

=== W ===
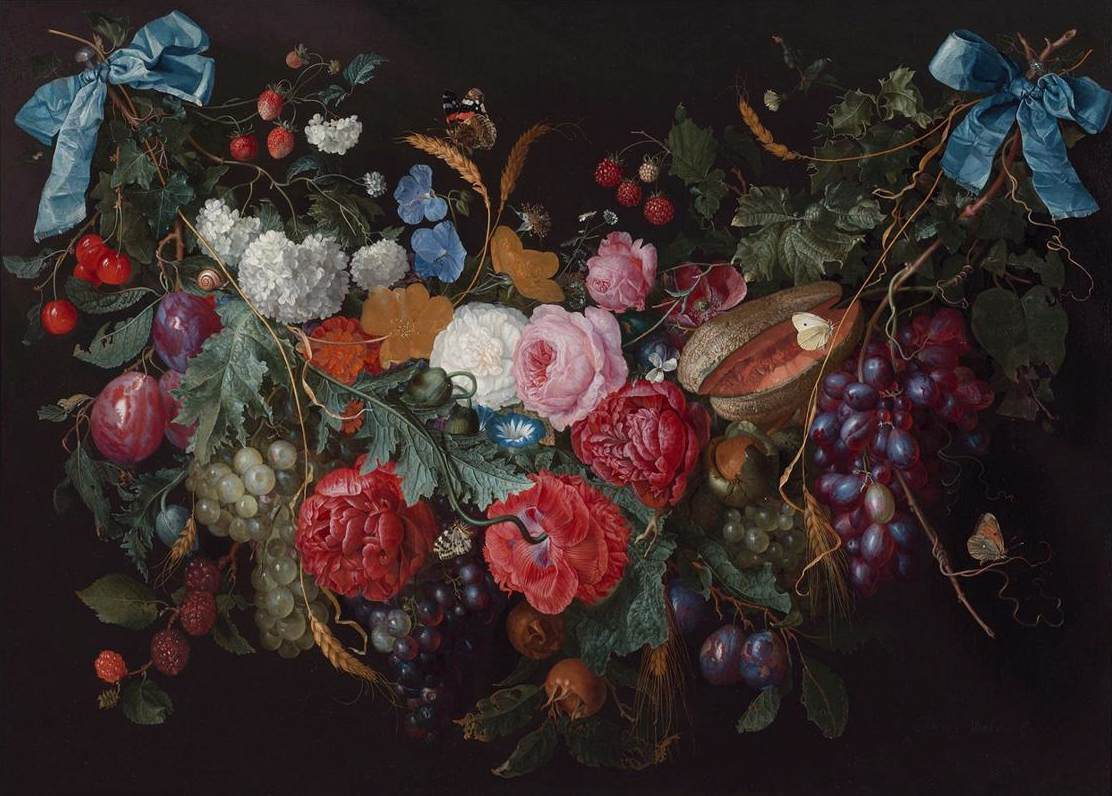
Jacob van Walscapelle, 1670s

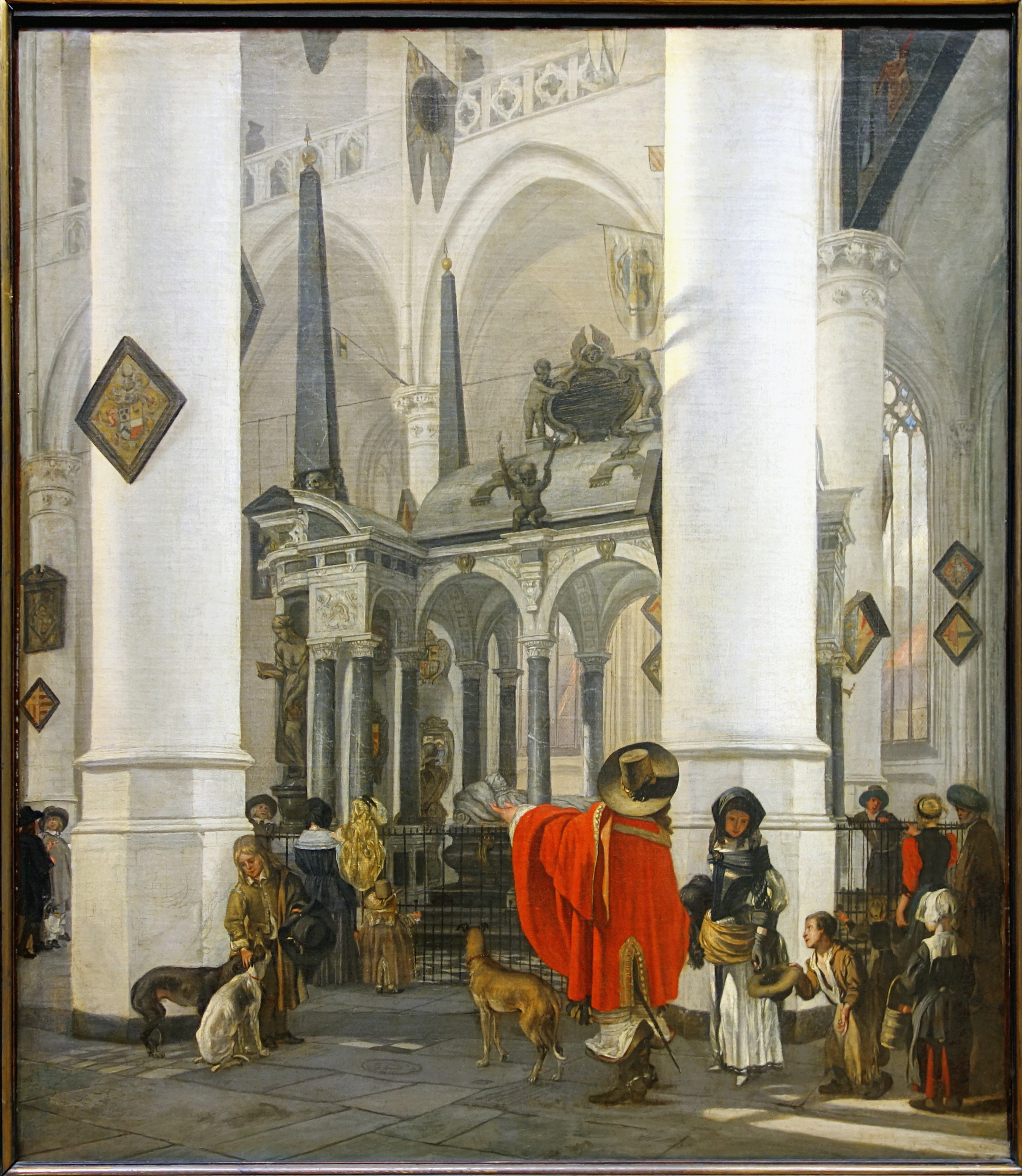
Emanuel de Witte, 1656

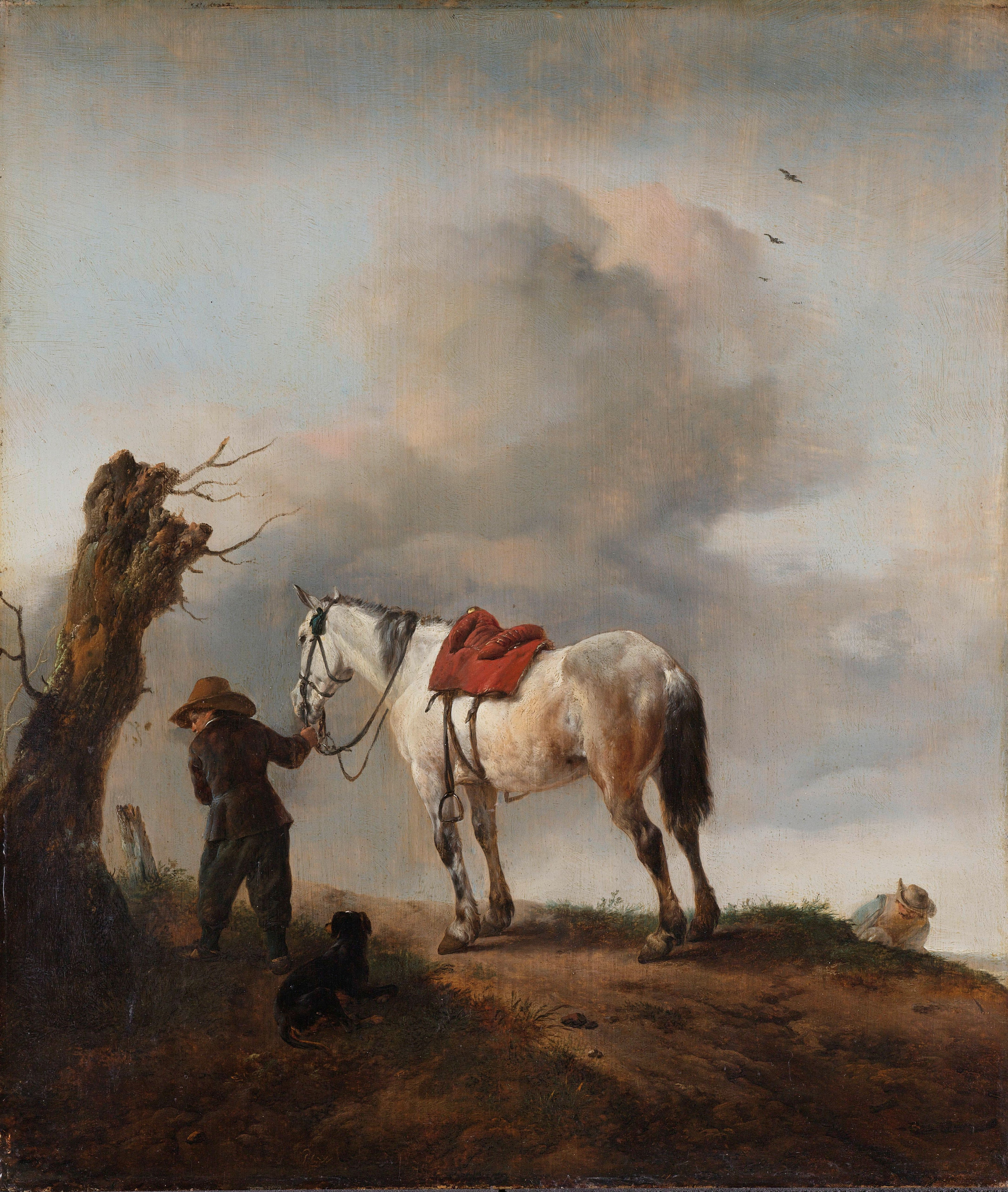
Philips Wouwerman, 1646

- Waben, Jacques (Alkmaar 1584/86 – Hoorn 1641/42)
- Walscapelle, Jacob van (Dordrecht 1644 – Amsterdam 1727)
- Waterloo, Antonie (Lille 1609 – Utrecht 1690)
- Weenix, Jan (Amsterdam 1642 – Amsterdam 1719)
- Weenix, Jan Baptist (Amsterdam 1621 – Vleuten 1659)
- Werff, Adriaen van der (Kralingen 1659 – Rotterdam 1722)
- Werff, Pieter van der (Kralingen 1665 – Rotterdam 1722)
- Wet, Jacob de (Haarlem c. 1610 – Haarlem or Cologne aft. 1677)
- Wet, Jacob Jacobsz de (Haarlem 1641/42 – Amsterdam 1697)
- Wieringen, Cornelis Claesz van (Haarlem 1575/76 – Haarlem 1633)
- Wijck, Thomas (Beverwijk c. 1620 – Haarlem 1677)
- Wijckersloot, Jan van (Utrecht 1625/30 – Amsterdam 1687)
- Wijnants, Jan (Haarlem 1632 – Amsterdam 1684)
- Wijtmans, Mattheus (Den Bosch 1638 – Utrecht 1689
- Willaerts, Abraham (Utrecht 1607/13 – Utrecht 1669)
- Willaerts, Adam (London 1577 – Utrecht 1664)
- Willingh, Nicolaes (The Hague 1638/40 – Berlin 1678)
- Wissing, Willem (Amsterdam c. 1656 – Stamford, Lincolnshire 1687)
- Withoos, Alida (Amersfoort 1659/60 – Hoorn 1730)
- Withoos, Matthias (Amersfoort 1627 – Hoorn 1703)
- Withoos, Pieter (Amersfoort 1655 – Amsterdam 1692)
- Witte, Emanuel de (Alkmaar 1617 – Amsterdam 1692)
- Wittel, Caspar van (Amersfoort 1652/56 – Rome 1736)
- Wolfsen, Aleijda (Zwolle 1648 – Zwolle 1692)
- Wouwerman, Jan (Haarlem 1629 – Haarlem 1666)
- Wouwerman, Philips (Haarlem 1619 – Haarlem 1668)
- Wouwerman, Pieter (Haarlem 1623 – Amsterdam 1682)
- Wtenbrouck, Moyses van (The Hague c. 1595 – The Hague 1647)
- Wtewael, Joachim (Utrecht 1566 – Utrecht 1638)
- Wtewael, Peter (Utrecht 1596 – Utrecht 1660)
- Wyck, Jan (Haarlem 1644/45 or 1652 – Mortlake 1702)

=== X–Z ===
- Zeelander, Pieter de (Haarlem bef. 1620 – aft. 1648)
- Zeeman, Reinier (Amsterdam 1623/24 – Amsterdam 1664)
- Zijl, Gerard Pietersz van (Leiden 1607/08 – Amsterdam 1665)

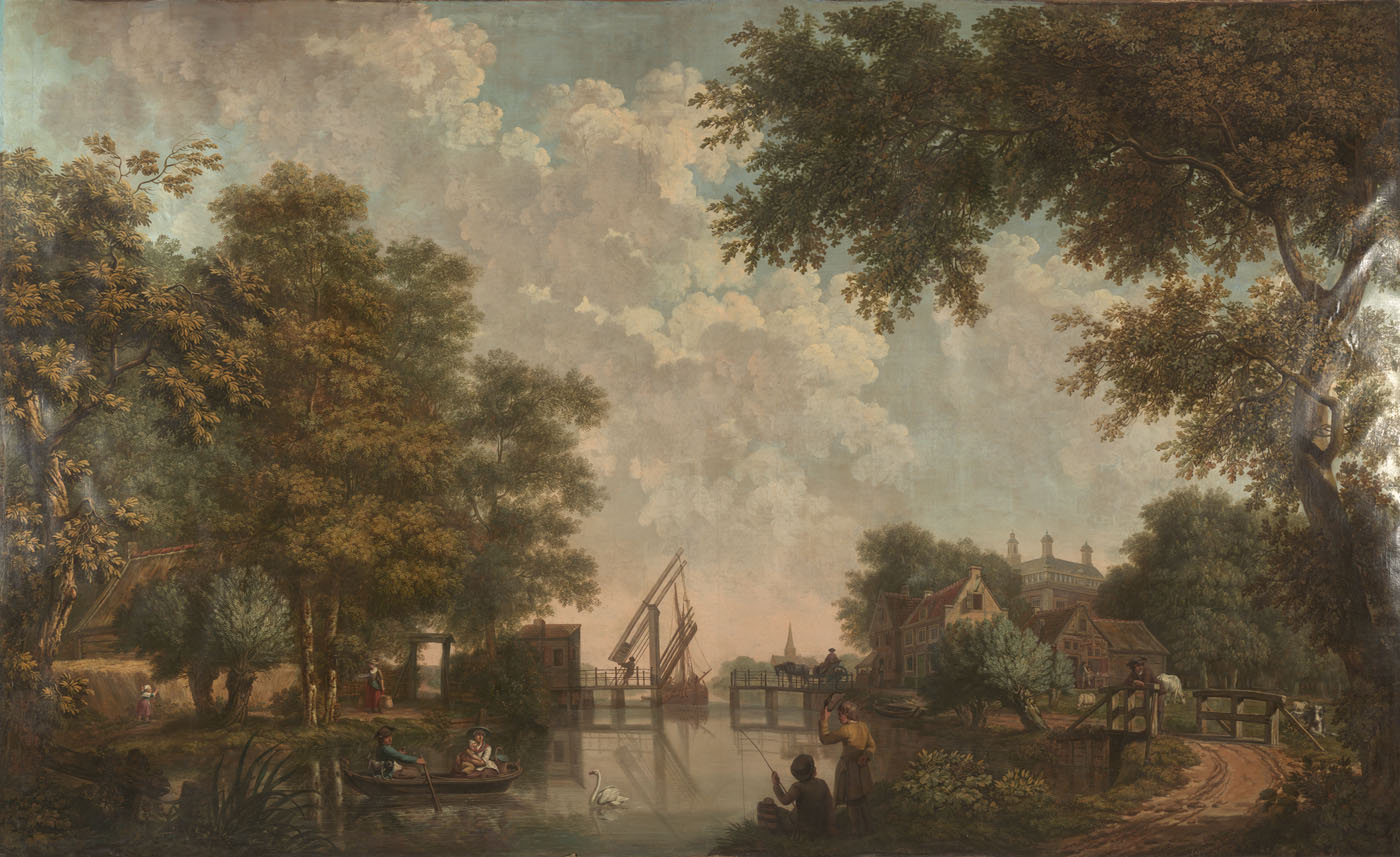
Jurriaan Andriessen, 1776

== 18th century ==
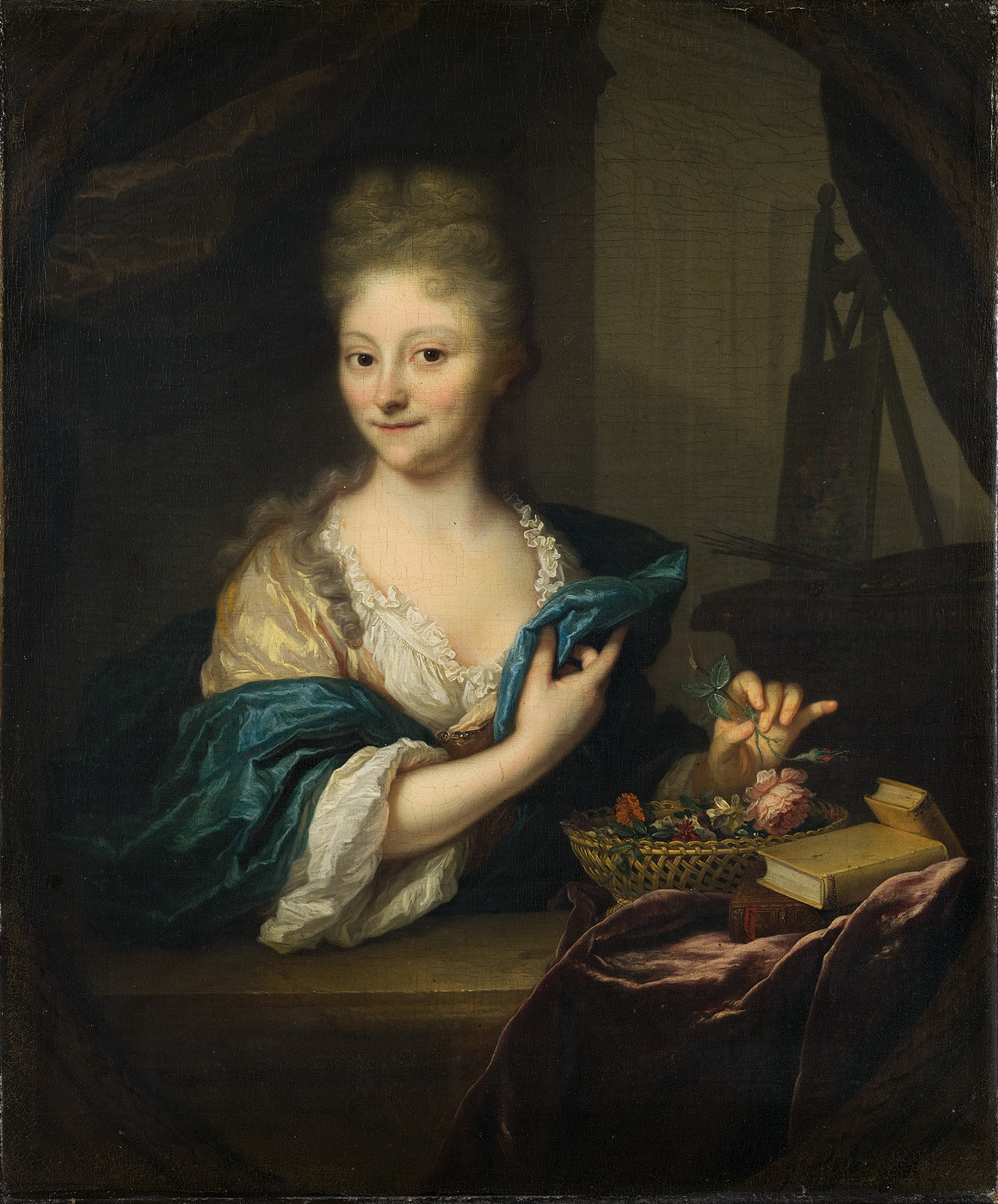
Catharina Backer, 1713

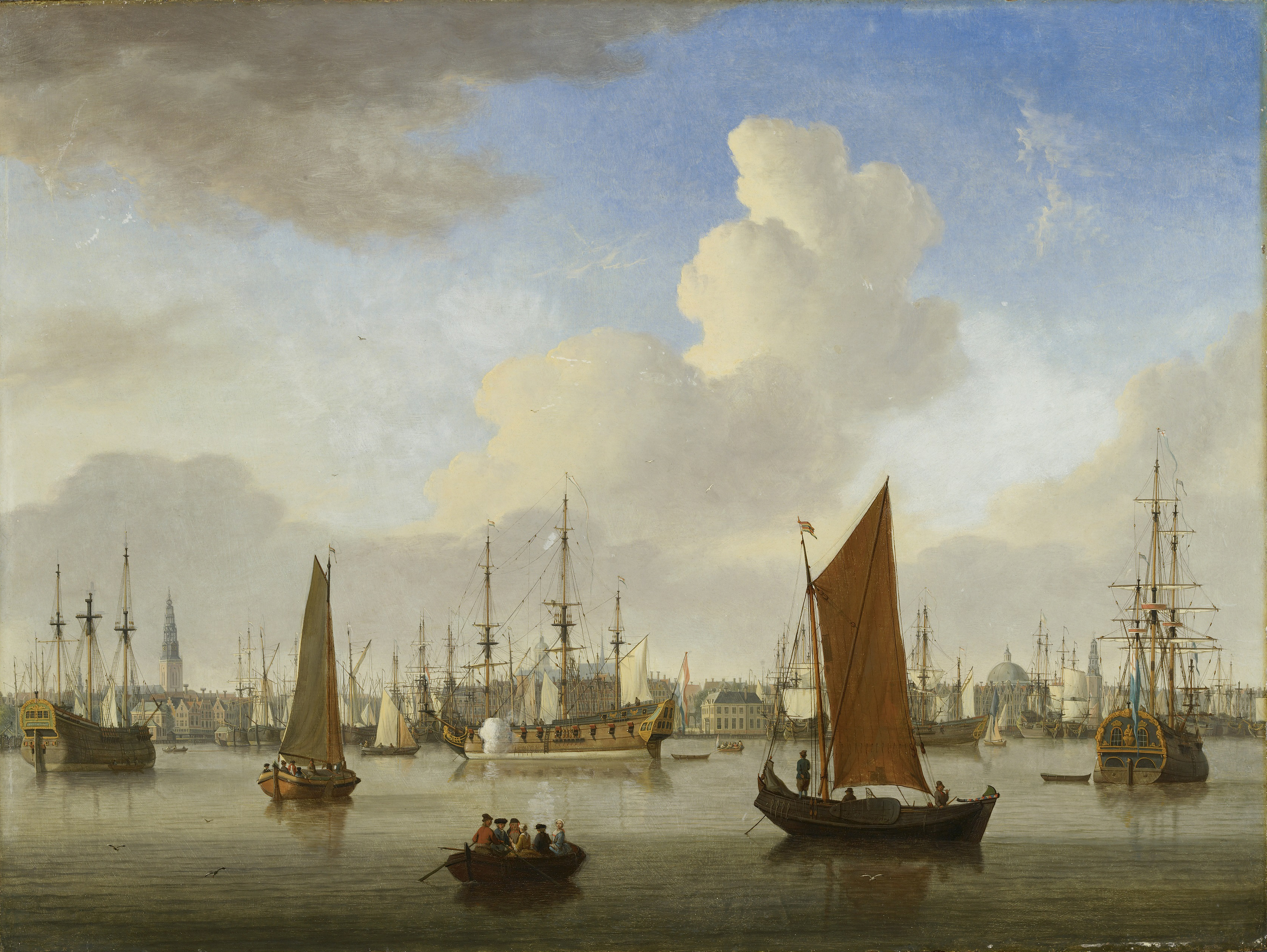
Jan ten Compe, 1752

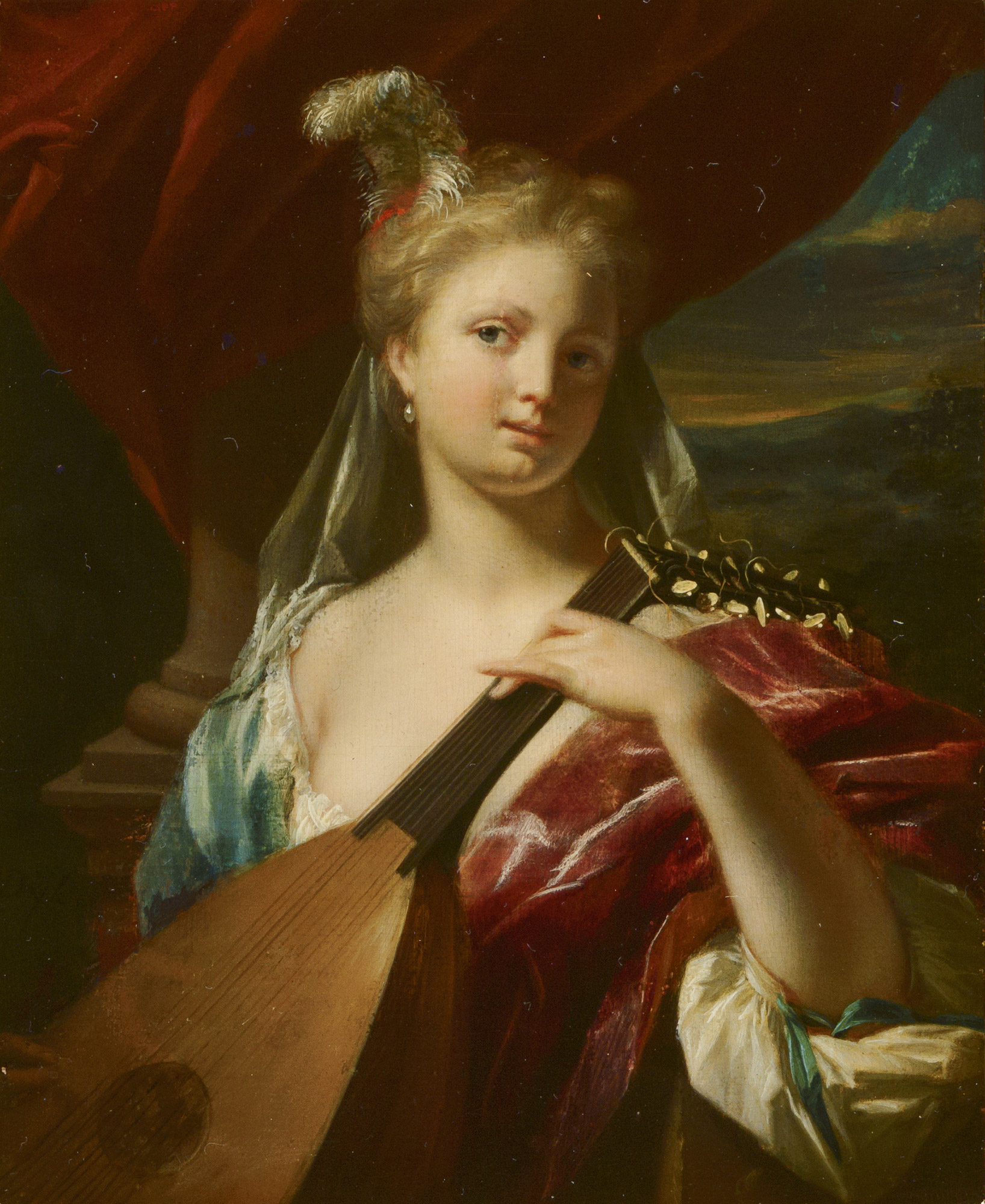
Philip van Dijk, ca. 1725

=== A-F ===
- Aa, Dirk van der (The Hague, 1731 – The Hague 1809)
- Accama, Bernardus (Burum 1697 – Leeuwarden 1756)
- Andriessen, Jurriaan (Amsterdam 1742 – Amsterdam 1819)
- Jan Augustini, Jan (Groningen 1725 – Haarlem 1773)
- Backer, Catharina (Amsterdam 1689 – Leiden 1766)
- Balen, Matthijs (Dordrecht 1684 – Dordrecht 1766)
- Barbiers, Bartholomeus (Amsterdam 1743 – Amsterdam 1808)
- Barbiers, Pieter (Amsterdam 1717 – Amsterdam 1780)
- Beijer, Jan de (Aarau 1703 – Cleves 1785)
- Bleeck, Peter van (The Hague 1697 – London 1764)
- Boonen, Arnold (Dordrecht 1669 – Amsterdam 1729)
- Brussel, Hermanus van (Haarlem 1763 – Utrecht 1815)
- Brussel, Paul Theodor van (Zuid-Polsbroek 1754 – Amsterdam 1795)
- Jan Bulthuis (Groningen 1750 – Amsterdam 1801)
- Burg, Adriaan van der (Dordrecht 1693 – Dordrecht 1733)
- Burg, Dirk van der (Utrecht 1721 – Utrecht 1773)
- Busschop, Abraham (Dordrecht 1670 – Middelburg 1729)
- Buys, Jacobus (Amsterdam 1724 – Amsterdam 1801)
- Cats, Jacob (Altona, Hamburg 1741 – Amsterdam 1799)
- Chalon, Christina (Amsterdam 1749 – Hazerswoude 1808)
- Coclers, Louis Bernard (Maastricht 1740 – Liège 1817)
- Compe, Jan ten (Amsterdam 1713 – Amsterdam 1761)
- Croix, Pierre Frédéric de la (France, 1709 – The Hague 1782)
- Croix, Susanna de la (Amsterdam, 1755 – The Hague 1789)
- Dalens, Dirck (III) (Amsterdam 1688 – Amsterdam 1753)
- Decker, Frans (Haarlem 1684 – Haarlem 1751)
- Dijk, Philip van (Oud-Beijerland 1683 – The Hague 1753)
- Dongen, Dionys van (Dordrecht 1748 – Rotterdam 1819)
- Drielst, Egbert van (Groningen 1745 – Amsterdam 1818)
- Ekels the Elder, Jan (Amsterdam 1724 – Amsterdam 1781)
- Ekels the Younger, Jan (Amsterdam 1759 – Amsterdam 1793)
- Fargue, Jacob Elias la (Voorburg 1735 – The Hague 1778)
- Fargue, Karel la (The Hague 1738 – The Hague 1793)
- Fargue, Maria Margaretha la (The Hague 1738 – The Hague 1813)
- Fargue, Paulus Constantijn la (The Hague 1729 – The Hague 1782)
- Frey, Aletta de (Amsterdam 1768 – Mannheim 1808)
- Van Edele, Pieter (Amsterdam 1770 - London 1839)

=== G-M ===
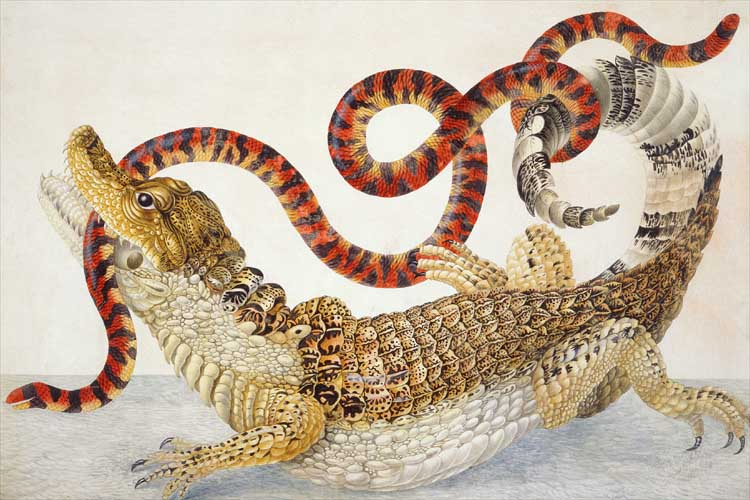
Dorothea Maria Graff, 1701/05

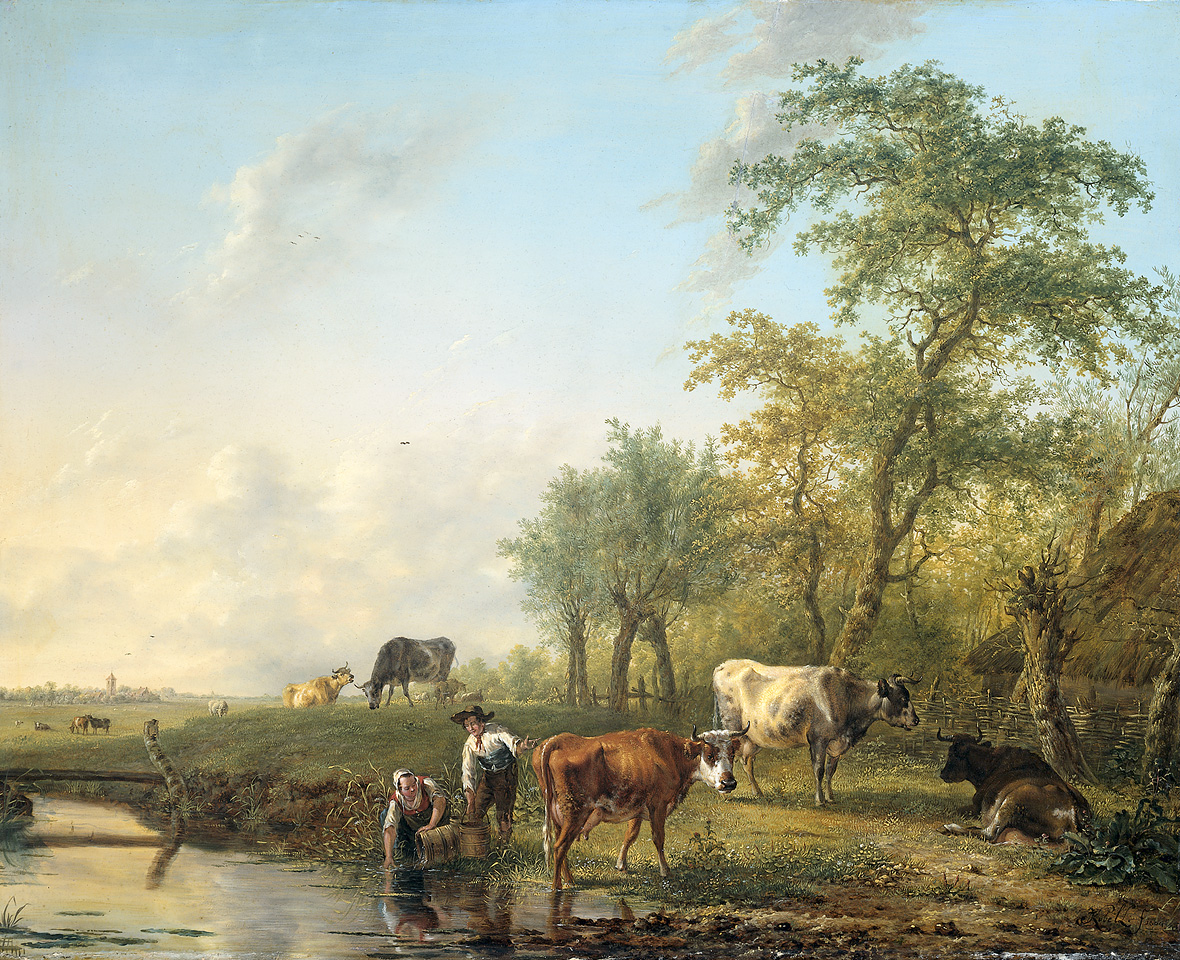
Jan Kobell, 1804

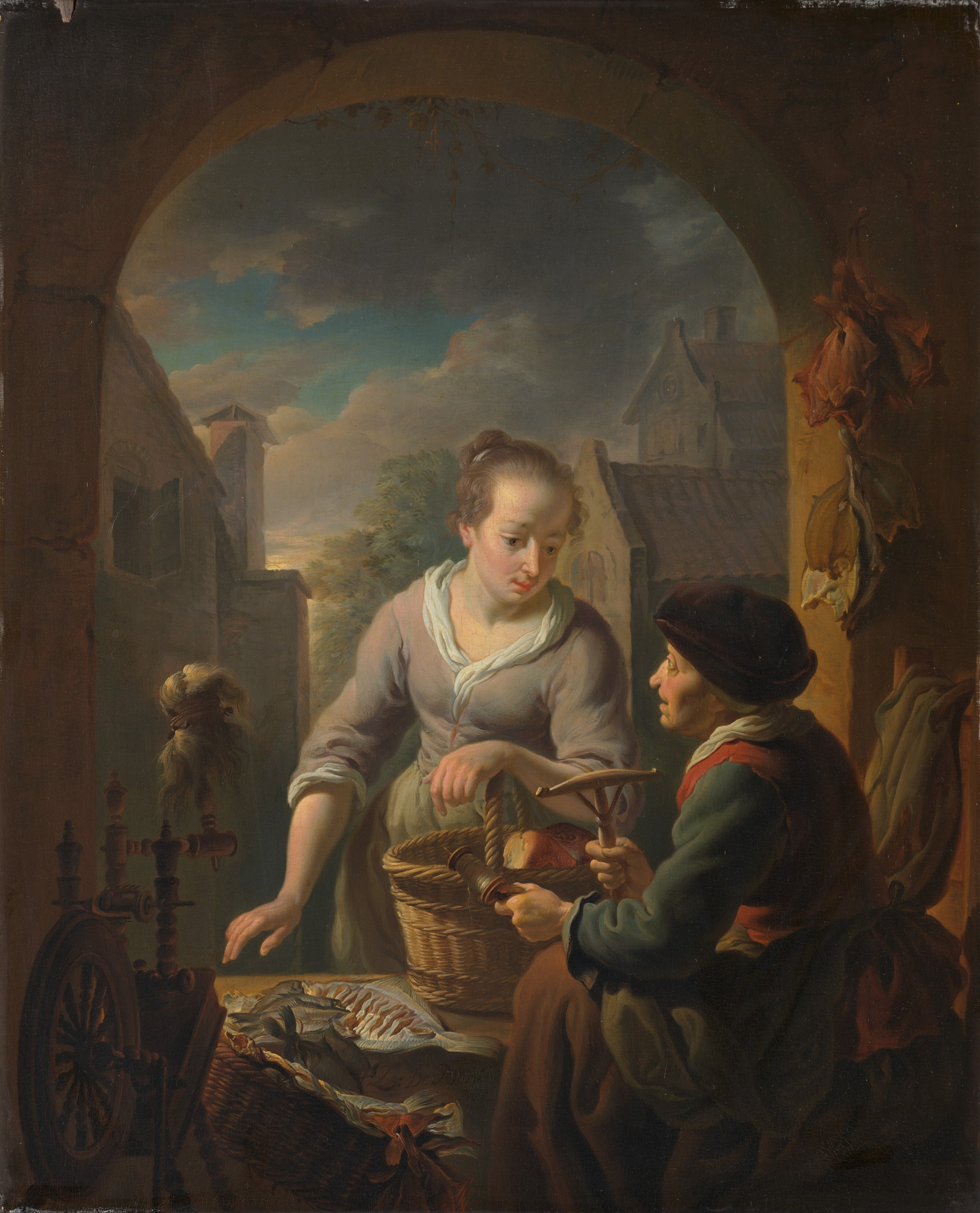
Louis de Moni, 1742

- Gool, Jan van (The Hague 1685 – The Hague 1763)
- Graff, Dorothea Maria (Nuremberg 1678 – Saint Petersburg 1743)
- Grandjean, Jean (Amsterdam 1752 – Rome 1781)
- Grasdorp, Willem (Zwolle 1678 – Amsterdam 1723)
- Greve, Aleida (Zwolle 1670 – Zwolle 1742)
- Haag, Tethart Philipp Christian (Kassel 1737 – The Hague 1812)
- Haverman, Margaretha (Breda 1693 – France? after 1739)
- Hendriks, Wybrand (Amsterdam 1744 – Haarlem 1831)
- Herolt, Johanna Helena (Frankfurt 1668 – Suriname ? after 1723)
- Houbraken, Jacob (Dordrecht 1698 – Amsterdam 1780)
- Humbert, Jean (Amsterdam 1734 – Nieuwer-Amstel 1794)
- Huysum, Francina Margaretha van (Amsterdam 1707 – Amsterdam 1789)
- Huysum, Jacob van (Amsterdam 1688 – London 1740)
- Huysum, Jan van (Amsterdam 1682 – Amsterdam 1749)
- Jelgerhuis, Rienk (Leeuwarden 1729 – Amsterdam 1806)
- Jelgersma, Tako Hajo (Harlingen 1702 – Haarlem 1795)
- Keun, Hendrik (Haarlem 1738 – Haarlem 1787)
- Kobell, Hendrik (Rotterdam 1751 – Rotterdam 1779)
- Kobell, Jan (Delfshaven 1778 – Amsterdam 1814)
- Kouwenbergh, Philip van (Amsterdam 1671 – Amsterdam 1729)
- Langendijk, Dirk (Rotterdam 1748 – Rotterdam 1805)
- Meijer, Hendrik (Amsterdam 1744 – London 1793)
- Mieris, Frans II van (Leiden 1689 – Leiden 1763)
- Mieris, Willem van (Leiden 1662 – Leiden 1747)
- Mijn, Agatha van der (Amsterdam 1700 – England? after 1768)
- Mijn, Cornelia van der (Amsterdam 1709 – London 1782)
- Mijn, George van der (London 1727 – Amsterdam 1763)
- Mijn, Herman van der (Amsterdam 1684 – London 1741)
- Moni, Louis de (Breda 1698 – Leiden 1771)
- Moninckx, Maria (The Hague 1673/76 – Amsterdam 1757)
- Moucheron, Isaac de (Amsterdam 1667 – Amsterdam 1744)

=== N-R ===
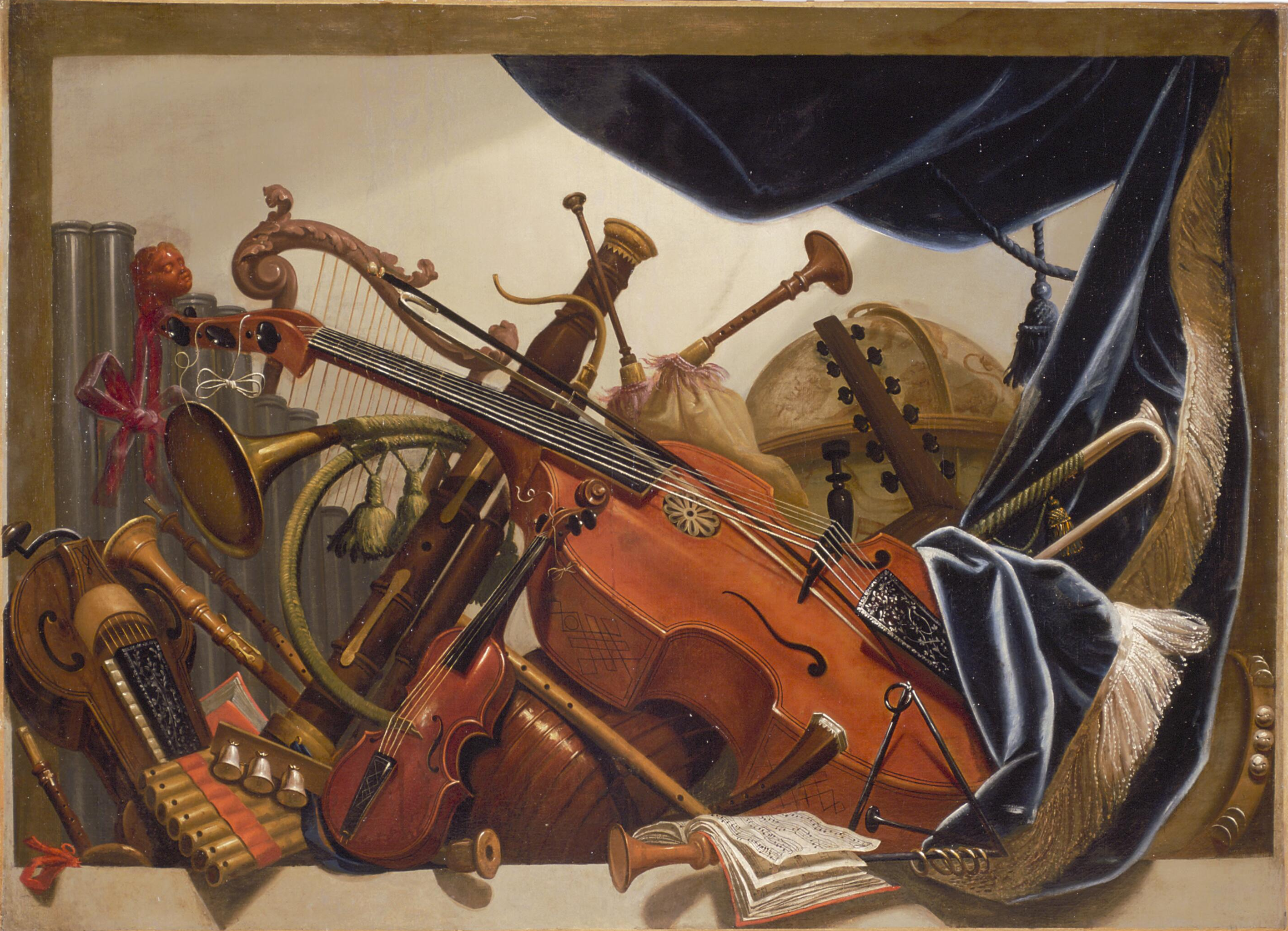
Elias van Nijmegen, 1700/50

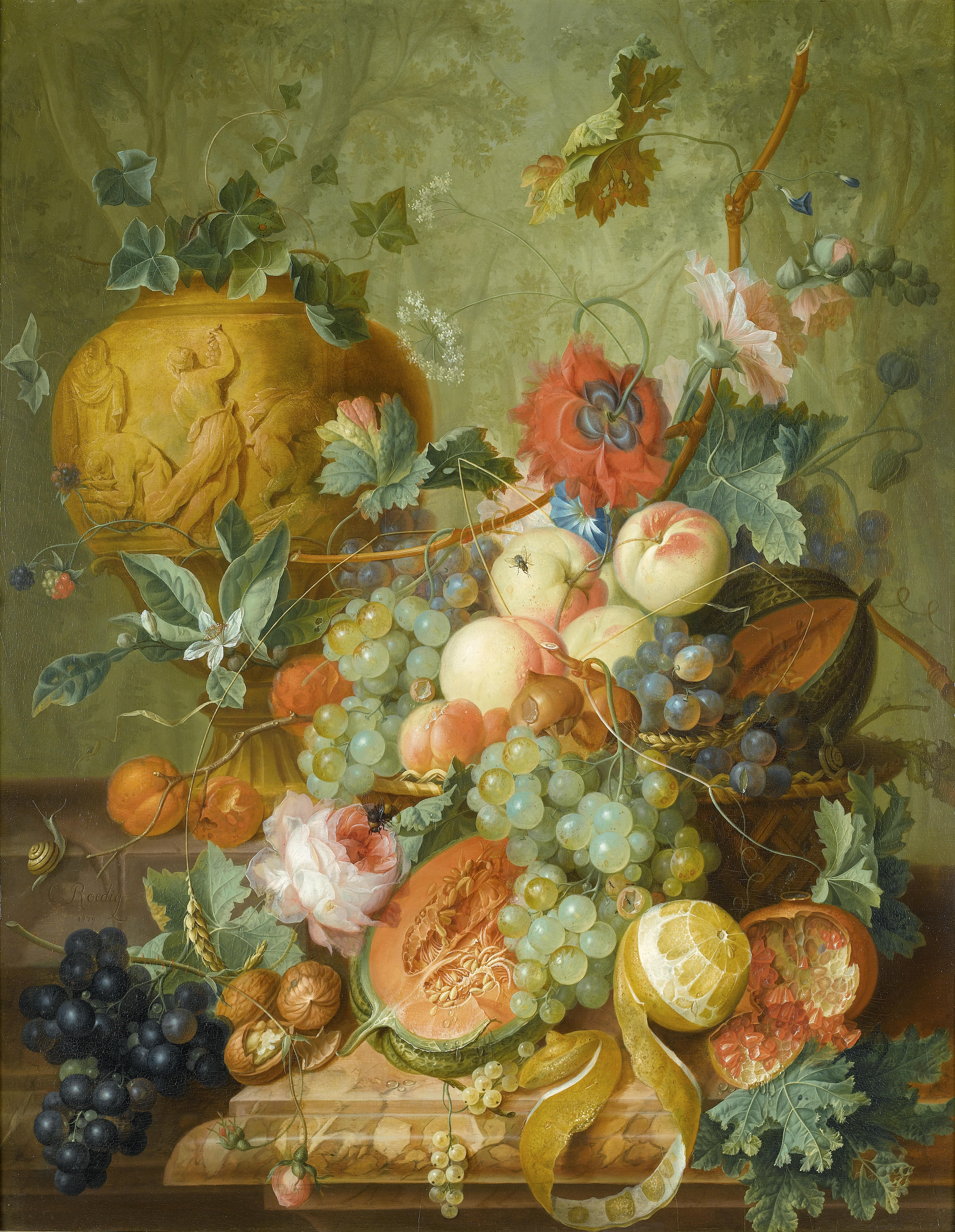
Johannes Christianus Roedig, 1779

- Netscher, Constantijn (The Hague 1668 – The Hague 1723)
- Nickelen, Jacoba Maria van (Haarlem 1680/90 – Amsterdam 1749)
- Nijmegen, Dionys van (Rotterdam 1705 – Rotterdam 1798)
- Nijmegen, Elias van (Nijmegen 1667 – Rotterdam 1755)
- Noorde, Cornelis van (Haarlem 1731 – Amsterdam 1795)
- Numan, Hermanus (Ezinge 1744 – Amsterdam 1820)
- Os, Jan van (Middelharnis 1744 – The Hague 1808)
- Ouwater, Isaac (Amsterdam 1748 – Amsterdam 1793)
- Palthe, Gerhard Jan (Denekamp 1681 – Deventer 1767)
- Palthe, Jan (Deventer 1717 – Leiden 1769)
- Pee, Henriëtta van (Amsterdam 1692 – Haarlem 1741)
- Ploos van Amstel, Cornelis (Weesp 1726 – Amsterdam 1798)
- Pol, Christiaan van (Heemstede 1752 – Paris 1813)
- Ponse, Joris (Dordrecht 1723 – Dordrecht 1783)
- Pool Juriaen (Amsterdam 1666 — Amsterdam 1745)
- Pothoven, Hendrik (Amsterdam 1725 – The Hague 1807)
- Pronk, Cornelis (Amsterdam 1691 – Amsterdam 1759)
- Quinkhard, Jan Maurits (Rees 1688 – Amsterdam 1772)
- Rademaker, Abraham (Lisse 1676/77 – Haarlem 1735)
- Regters, Tibout (Dordrecht 1710 – Amsterdam 1768)
- Rietschoof, Hendri (Hoorn 1678 – Koog aan de Zaan 1746)
- Roedig, Johannes Christianus (The Hague 1750 – The Hague 1802)
- Roepel, Coenraet (The Hague 1678 – The Hague 1748)
- Ruysch, Rachel (The Hague 1664 – Amsterdam 1750)

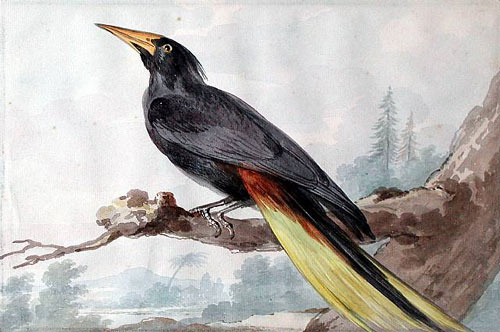
Aert Schouman, ca 1780

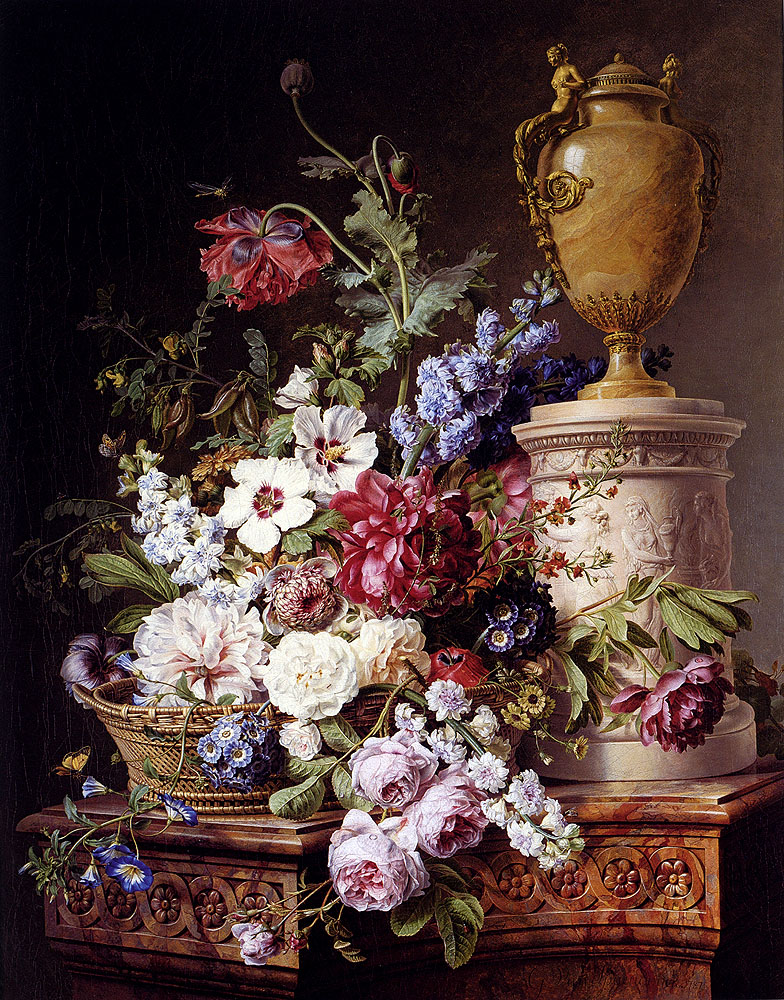
Gerard van Spaendonck, 1787

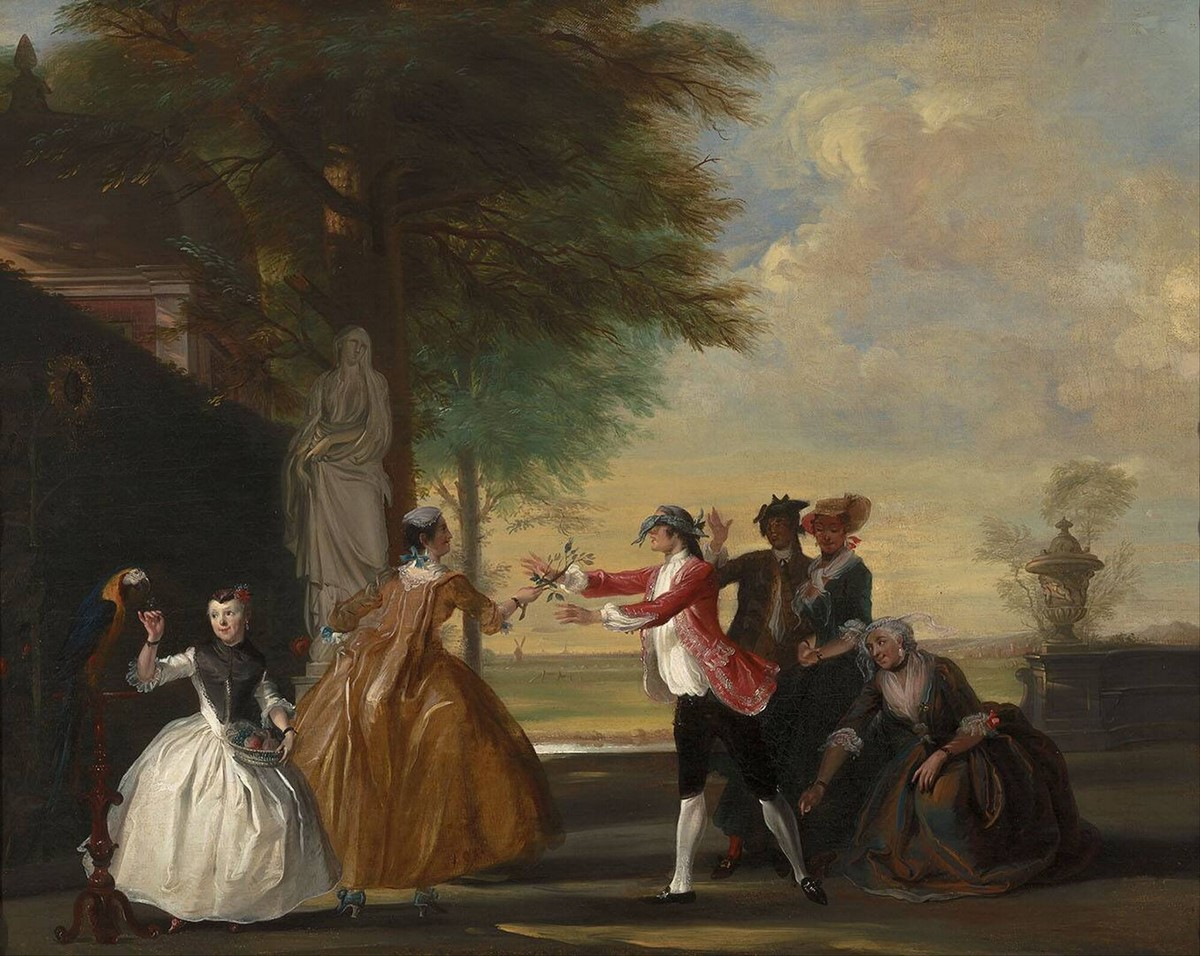
Cornelis Troost, c. 1740

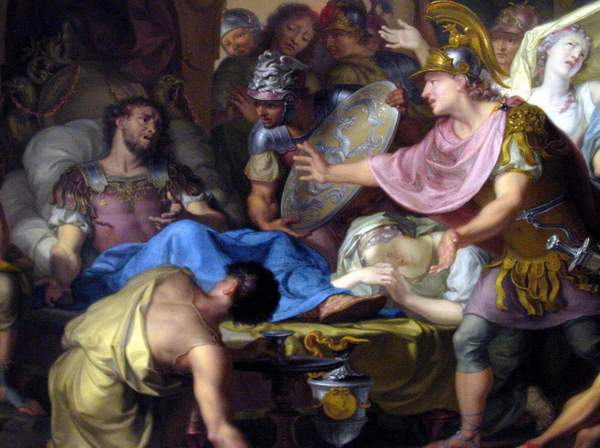
Isaac Walraven, 1726

=== S-Z ===
- Scheffer, Johan Bernard (Homberg 1764 – Amsterdam 1809)
- Schouman, Aert (Dordrecht 1710 – The Hague 1792)
- Silo, Adam (Amsterdam 1674 – Amsterdam 1760)
- Spaendonck, Cornelis van (Tilburg 1756 – Paris 1839)
- Spaendonck, Gerard van (Tilburg 1746 – Paris 1822)
- Spilman, Hendrik (Amsterdam 1721 – Haarlem 1784)
- Stolker, Jan (Amsterdam 1724 – Rotterdam 1785)
- Strij, Abraham van (Dordrecht 1753 – Dordrecht 1826)
- Strij, Jacob van (Dordrecht 1756 – Dordrecht 1815)
- Sypesteyn, Maria Machteld van (Haarlem 1724 – Heemstede 1774)
- Tavnier, Hendrik (Haarlem 1734 – Haarlem 1807)
- Terwesten, Mattheus (The Hague 1670 – Berlin 1757)
- Troost, Cornelis (Amsterdam 1696 – Amsterdam 1750)
- Troost, Sara (Amsterdam 1732 – Amsterdam 1803)
- Troost, Willem (Amsterdam 1684 – Amsterdam 1752)
- Valkenburg, Dirk (Amsterdam 1675 – Amsterdam 1721)
- Vanderlyn, Pieter (Netherlands 1687 – Kingston, New York? 1778)
- Verbruggen, Jan (Enkhuizen 1712 – London 1781)
- Verelst, Cornelis (Amsterdam 1667 – London 1734)
- Verheyden, Mattheus (Breda 1700 – The Hague 1776)
- Verkolje, Nicolaas (Delft 1673 – Amsterdam 1746)
- Vermeulen, Andries (Dordrecht 1763 – Amsterdam 1814)
- Vinkeles, Reinier (Amsterdam 1741 – Amsterdam 1816)
- Vinne, Vincent Jansz van der (Haarlem 1736 – Haarlem 1811)
- Vinne, Vincent Laurensz van der (Haarlem 1686 – Haarlem 1742)
- Walraven, Isaac (Amsterdam 1686 – Amsterdam 1765)
- Wandelaar, Jan (Amsterdam 1690 – Leiden 1759)
- Wassenbergh, Elisabeth Geertruida (Groningen 1729 – Groningen 1781)
- Wassenbergh, Jan Abel (Groningen 1689 – Groningen 1750)
- Weenix, Maria (Amsterdam 1697 – Amsterdam 1774)
- Werff, Adriaen van der (Kralingen 1659 – Rotterdam 1722)
- Werff, Pieter van der (Kralingen 1665 – Rotterdam 1722)
- Weyerman, Jacob Campo (Charleroi 1677 – The Hague 1747)
- Wigmana, Gerard (Workum 1673 – Amsterdam 1741)
- Wilkens, Theodoor (Amsterdam 1682 – Amsterdam 1748)
- Wilt, Thomas van der (Piershil 1659 – Delft 1733)
- Wit, Jacob de (Amsterdam 1695 – Amsterdam 1754)
- Xavery, Frans (The Hague 1740 – after 1788)
- Zegelaar, Gerrit (Loenen aan de Vecht 1719 – Wageningen 1794)

== 19th century ==
=== A-G ===
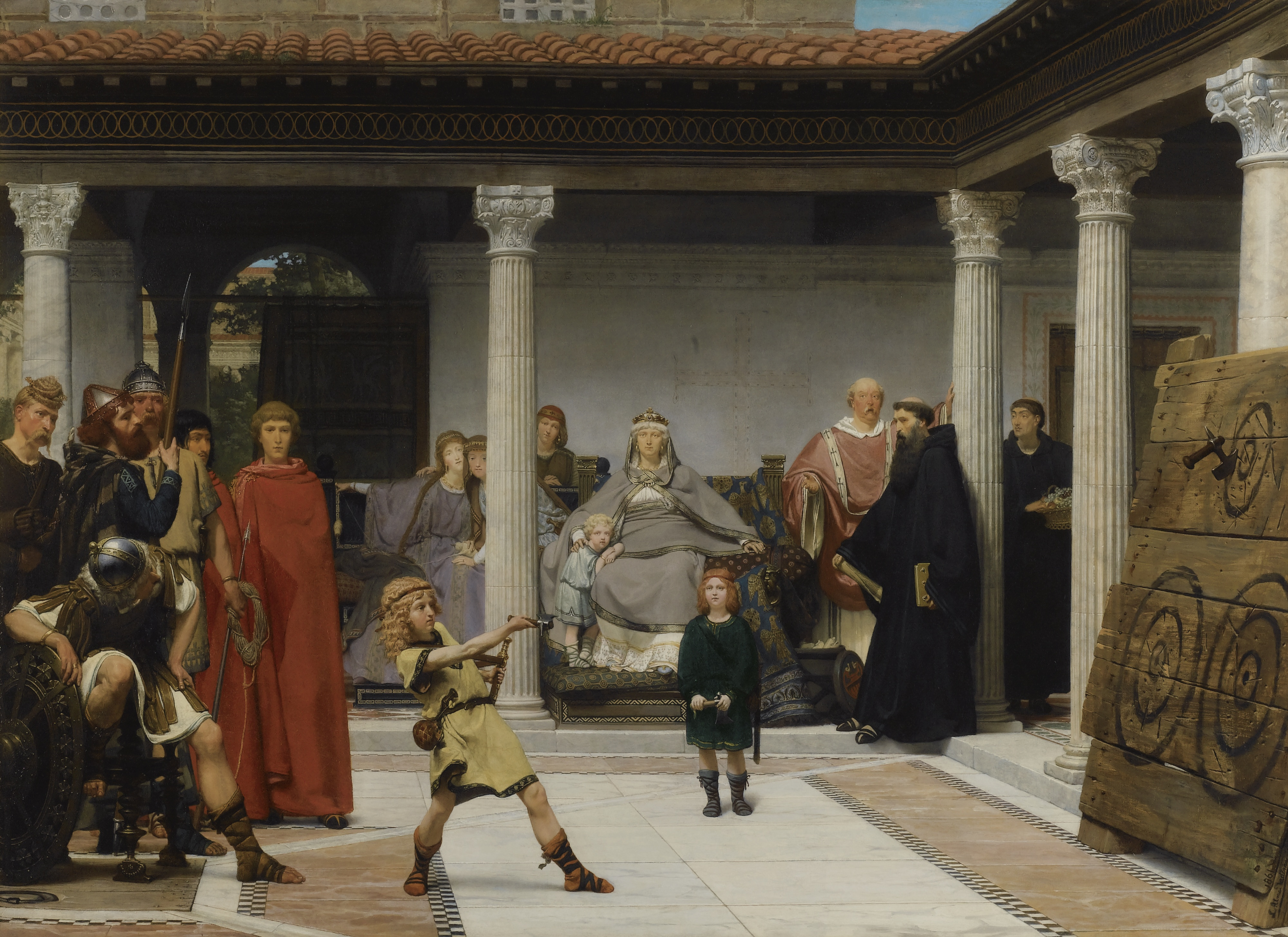
Lourens Alma Tadema, 1861

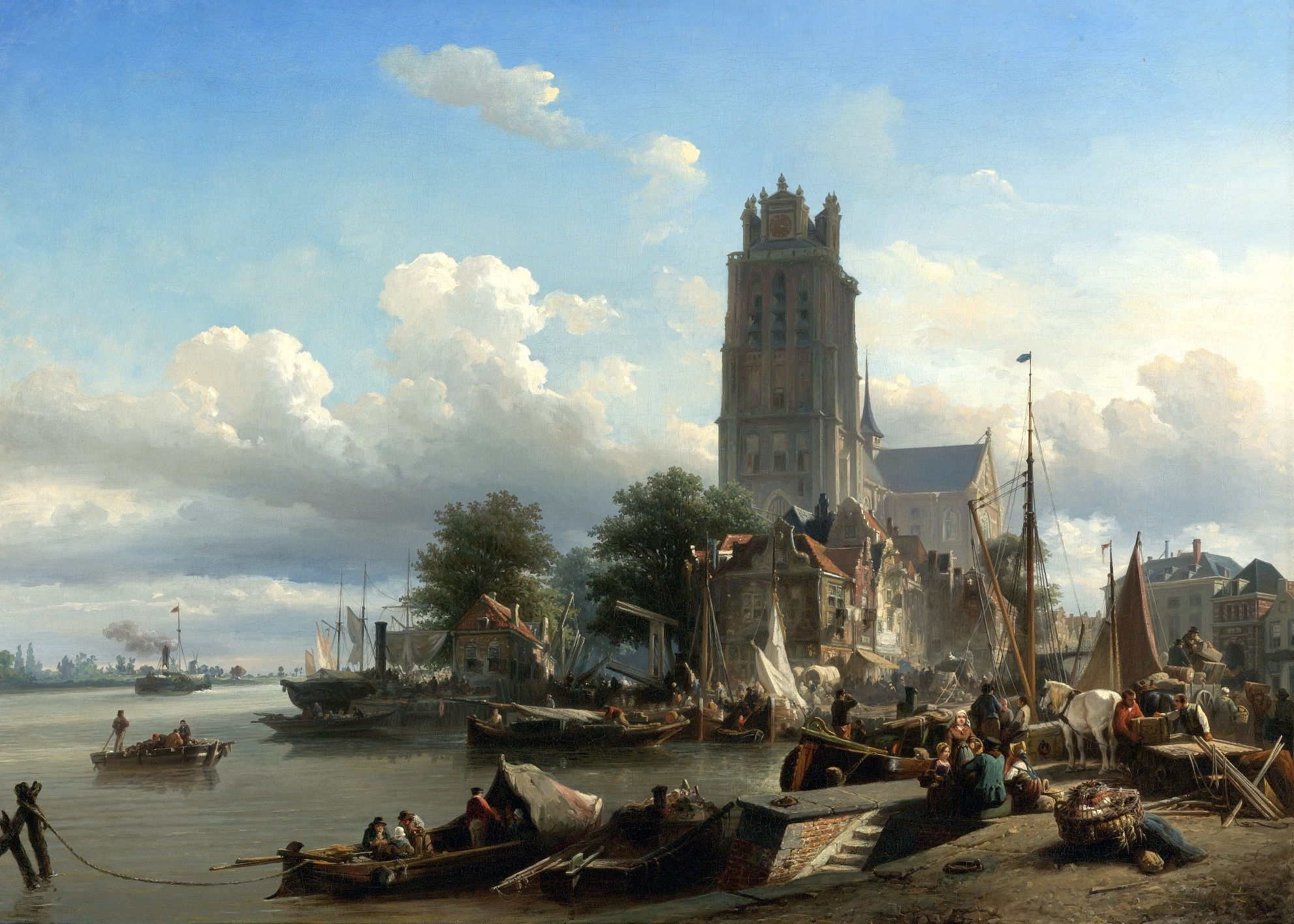
Elias van Bommel, 1882

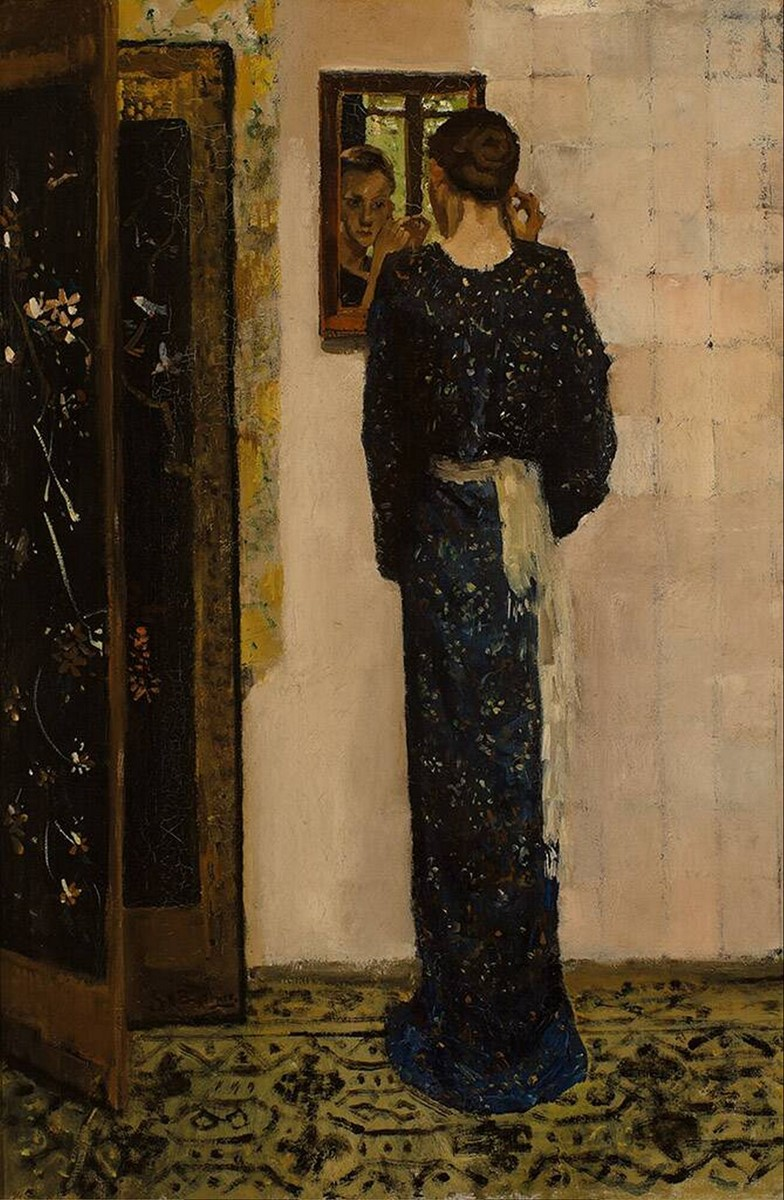
George Hendrik Breitner, 1894

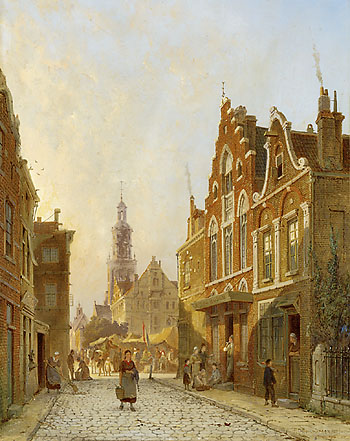
Pieter Cornelis Dommersen, 1889

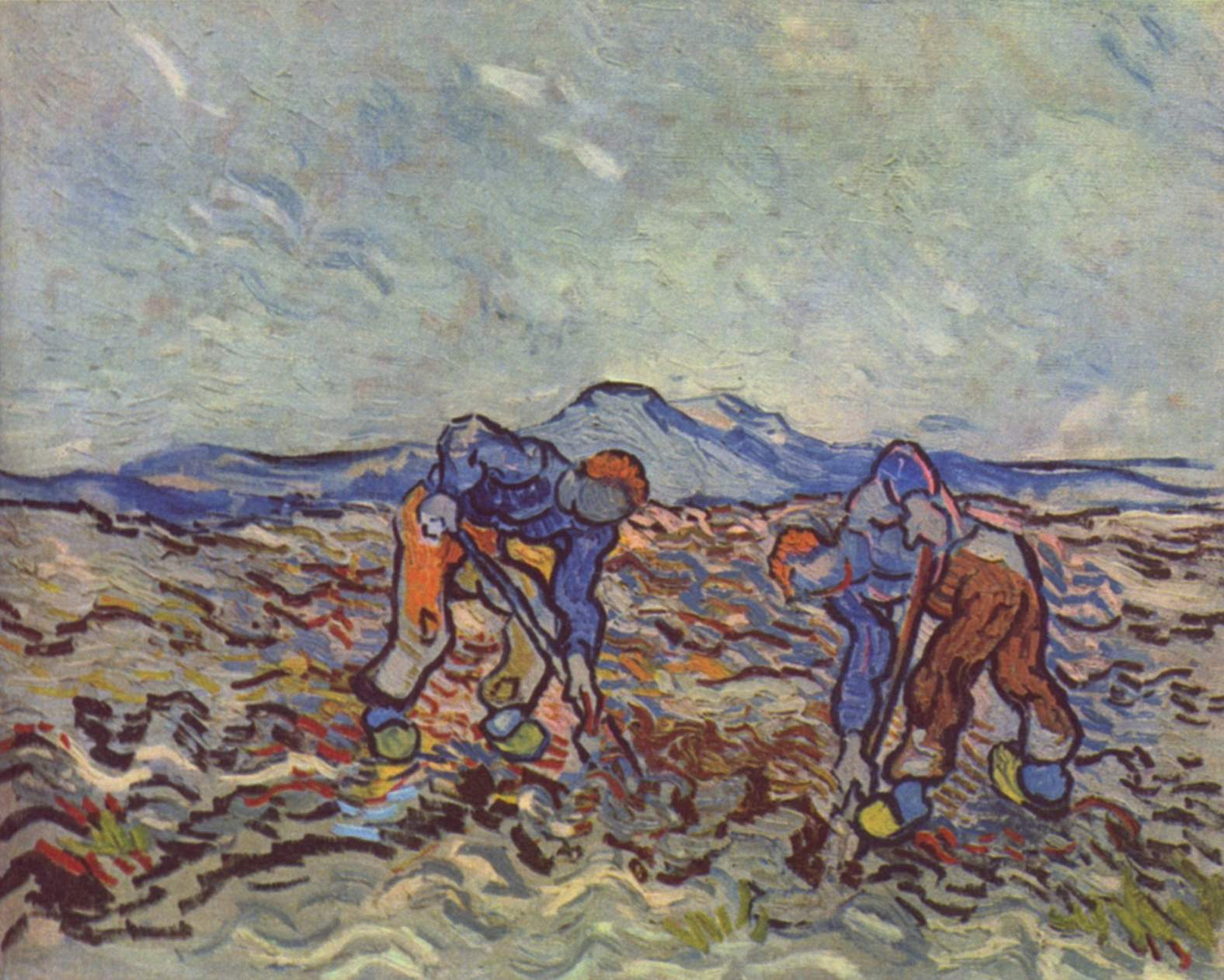
Vincent van Gogh, 1890

- Abels, Jacob (Amsterdam 1803 – Abcoude 1866)
- Abrahams, Anna Adelaïde (Middelburg 1849 – The Hague 1930)
- Allebé, August (Amsterdam 1838 – Amsterdam 1927)
- Alma-Tadema, Lawrence (Dronrijp 1836 – Wiesbaden 1912)
- Andriessen, Christiaan (Amsterdam 1775 – Amsterdam 1846)
- Apol, Louis (The Hague 1850 – The Hague 1936)
- Artan de Saint-Martin, Louis (The Hague 1837 – Oostduinkerke 1890)
- Artz, Adolph (The Hague 1837 – The Hague 1890)
- Bakker Korff, Alexander Hugo (The Hague 1824 – Leiden 1882)
- Barbiers, Maria Geertruida (Haarlem 1801 – Haarlem 1879)
- Bastert, Nicolaas (Maarssen 1854 – Loenen aan de Vecht 1939)
- Bilders, Gerard (Utrecht 1838 – The Hague 1865)
- Bilders, Johannes (Utrecht 1811 – Oosterbeek 1890)
- Bilders-van Bosse, Marie (Amsterdam 1837 – Wiesbaden 1900)
- Bisschop (Leeuwarden 1828 – The Hague 1904)
- Bisschop, Richard (Leeuwarden 1849 – Bergen 1926)
- Bisschop-Swift, Kate (London 1834 – The Hague 1928)
- Bles, David (The Hague 1821 – The Hague 1899)
- Blommers, Bernardus Johannes (The Hague 1845 – The Hague 1914)
- Bock, Théophile de (The Hague 1851 – Haarlem 1914)
- Boellaard, Margaretha Cornelia (Utrecht 1795 – Utrecht 1872)
- Borselen, Jan Willem van (Gouda 1825 – The Hague 1892)
- Bosch Reitz, Gijs (Amsterdam 1860 – Amsterdam 1938)
- Bosboom, Johannes (The Hague 1817 – The Hague 1891)
- Braakensiek, Johan (Amsterdam 1858 – Amsterdam 1940)
- Brandt, Albertus Jonas (Amsterdam 1787 – Amsterdam 1821)
- Breitner, George Hendrik (Rotterdam 1857 – Amsterdam 1923)
- Brondgeest, Albertus (Amsterdam 1786 – Amsterdam 1849)
- Calisch, Moritz (Amsterdam 1819 – Amsterdam 1870)
- Caspel (Ootmarsum 1870 – Utrecht 1928)
- Cate, Siebe Johannes ten (Sneek 1858 – Paris 1908)
- Cornet, Jacobus Ludovicus (Leiden 1815 – Leiden 1882)
- Craeyvanger, Gijsbertus (Utrecht 1810 – Amsterdam 1875)
- Craeyvanger, Reinier (Utrecht 1812 – Amsterdam 1880)
- Daiwaille, Jean Augustin (Cologne 1786 – Amsterdam 1850)
- Dankmeijer, Charles (Amsterdam 1861 – Scheveningen 1923)
- Derkinderen, Antoon (20 December 1859 – Amsterdam, 2 November 1925)
- Dijsselhof, Gerrit Willem (Zwollerkerspel 1866 – Overveen 1924)
- Doeleman, Jan Hendrik (Rotterdam 1848 – Voorburg 1913)
- Dommersen, Cornelis Christiaan (Utrecht 1842 – The Hague 1928)
- Dommersen, Pieter Cornelis (Utrecht 1834 – Hexham 1918)
- Eelkema, Eelke Jelles (Leeuwarden 1788, Leeuwarden 1839)
- Eerelman, Otto (Groningen 1839 – Groningen 1926)
- Egenberger, Johannes Hinderikus (Arnhem 1822 – Utrecht 1897)
- Ehnle, Adrianus Johannes (The Hague 1819 – Haarlem 1863)
- Enschedé, Catharina Jacoba Abrahamina (Haarlem 1828 – Bloemendaal 1883)
- Eversen, Adrianus (Amsterdam 1818 – Delft 1897)
- Famars Testas, Willem de (Utrecht 1834 – Arnhem 1896)
- Fontijn, Pieter (Dordrecht 1773 – Dordrecht 1839)
- Frankfort, Eduard (Meppel 1864 – Laren 1920)
- Gaal, Jacobus Cornelis (Oost-Souburg 1796 – Kampen 1866)
- Gabriël, Paul (Amsterdam 1828 – Scheveningen 1903)
- Gaykema Jacobsz, Jan (Heemstede 1798 – Leiden 1875)
- Gogh, Vincent van (Zundert 1853 – Auvers-sur-Oise 1890)
- Goovaerts, Henri (Maastricht 1865 – Maastricht 1912)
- Greive, Johan Conrad (Amsterdam 1837 – Amsterdam 1891)
- Greive, Petrus Franciscus (Amsterdam 1811 – Amsterdam 1872)

=== H-K ===
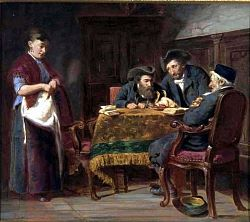
Meijer de Haan, 1880

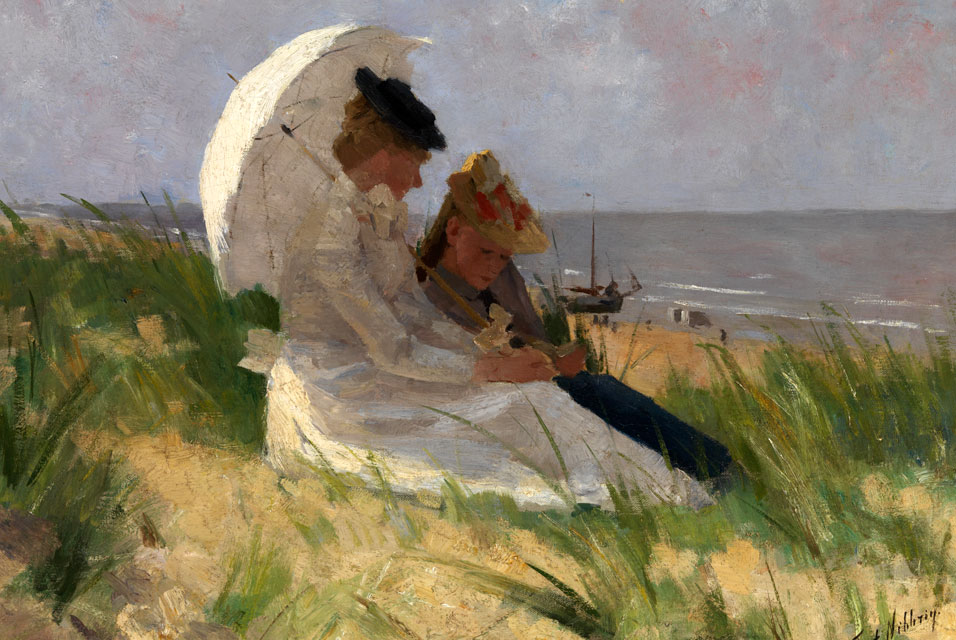
Ferdinand Hart Nibbrig, 1892

Hendrik Manfried Haus, 1841

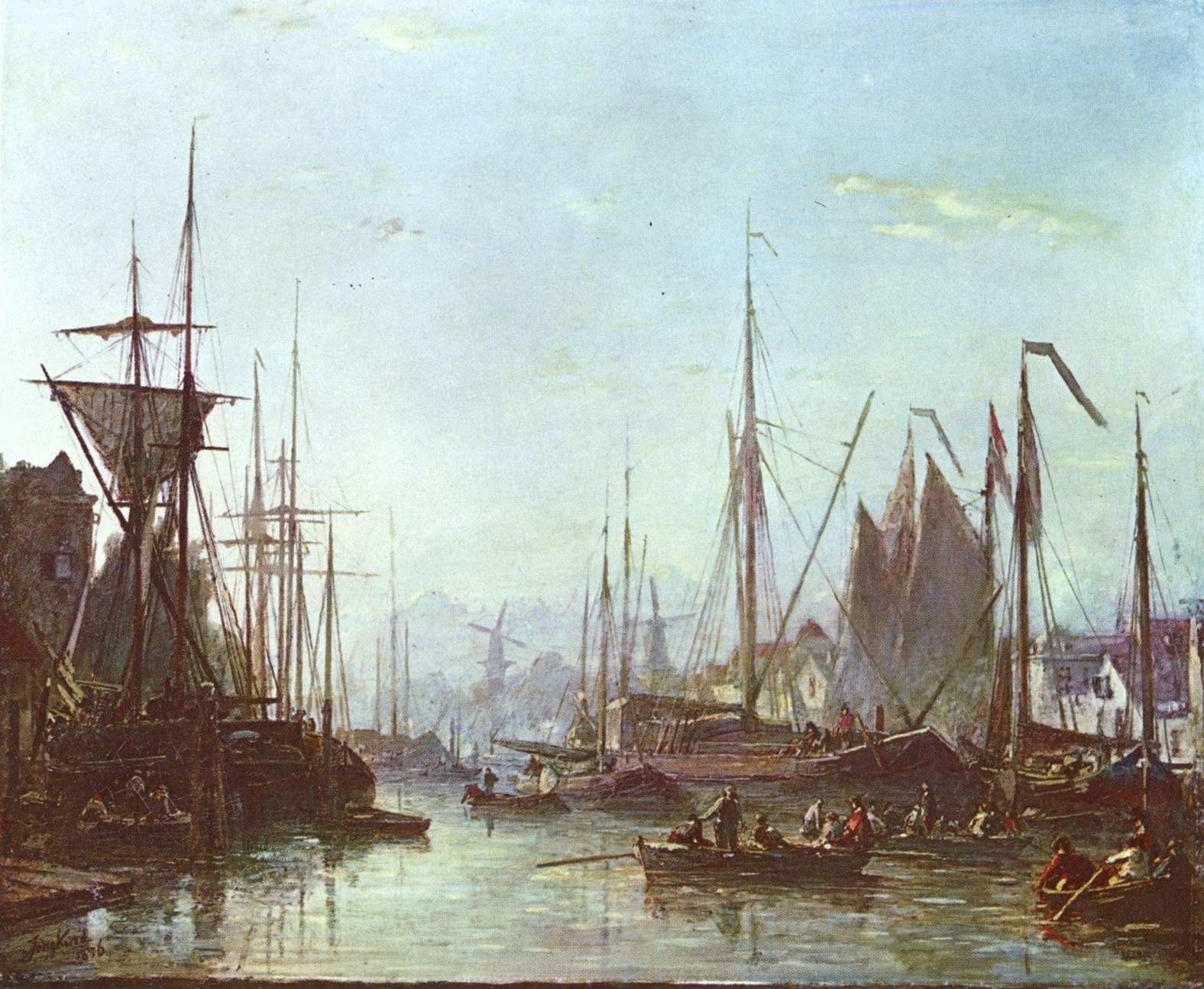
Johan Barthold Jongkind, 1856

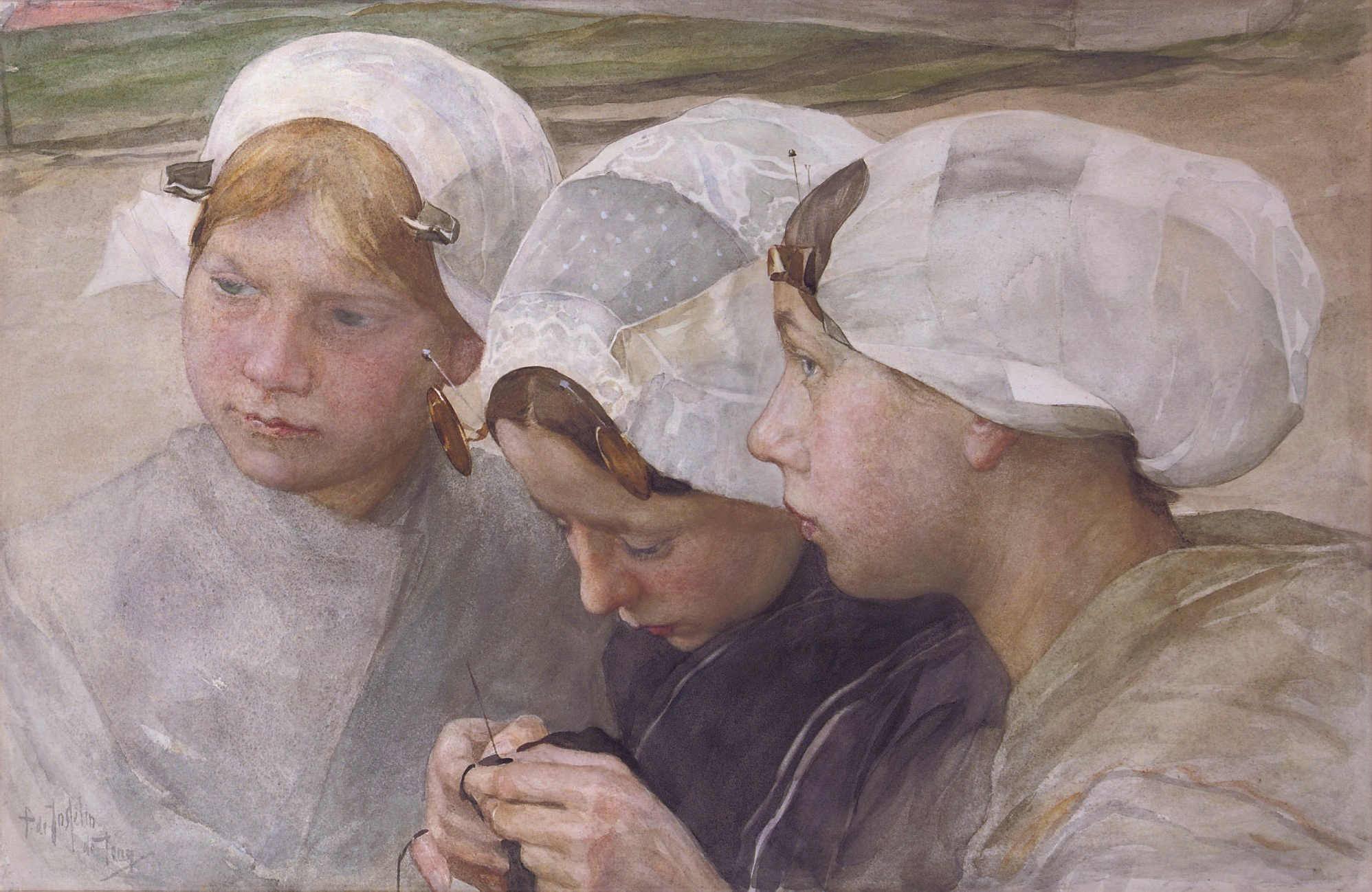
Pieter de Josselin de Jong, 1894

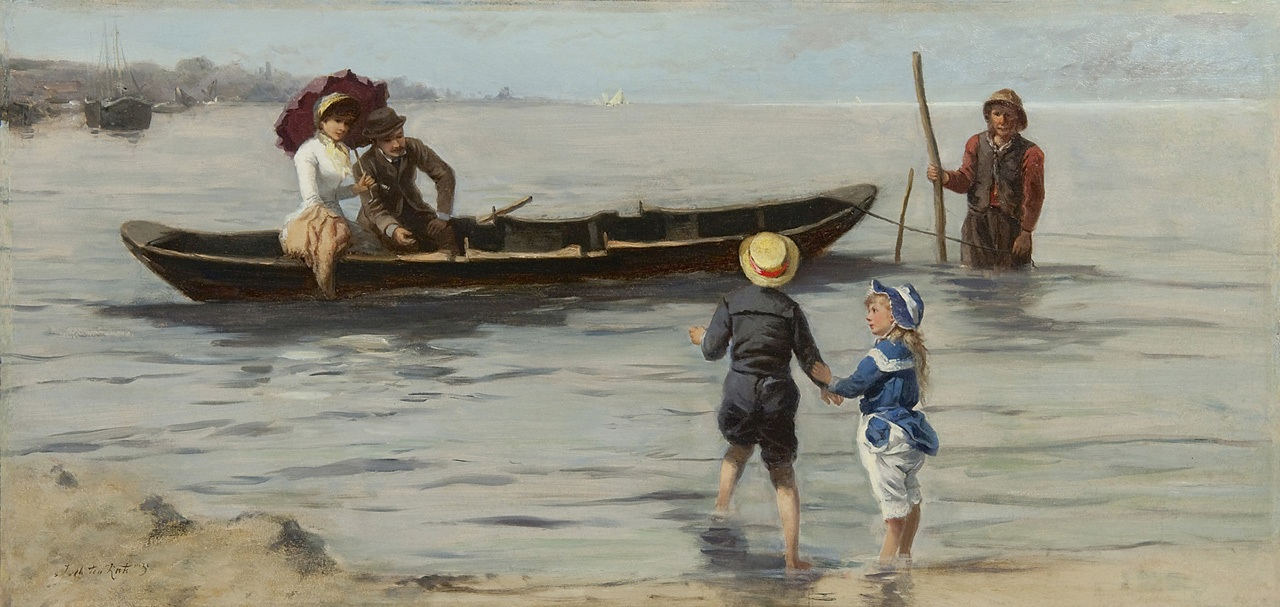
Johannes Marius ten Kate, c. 1885

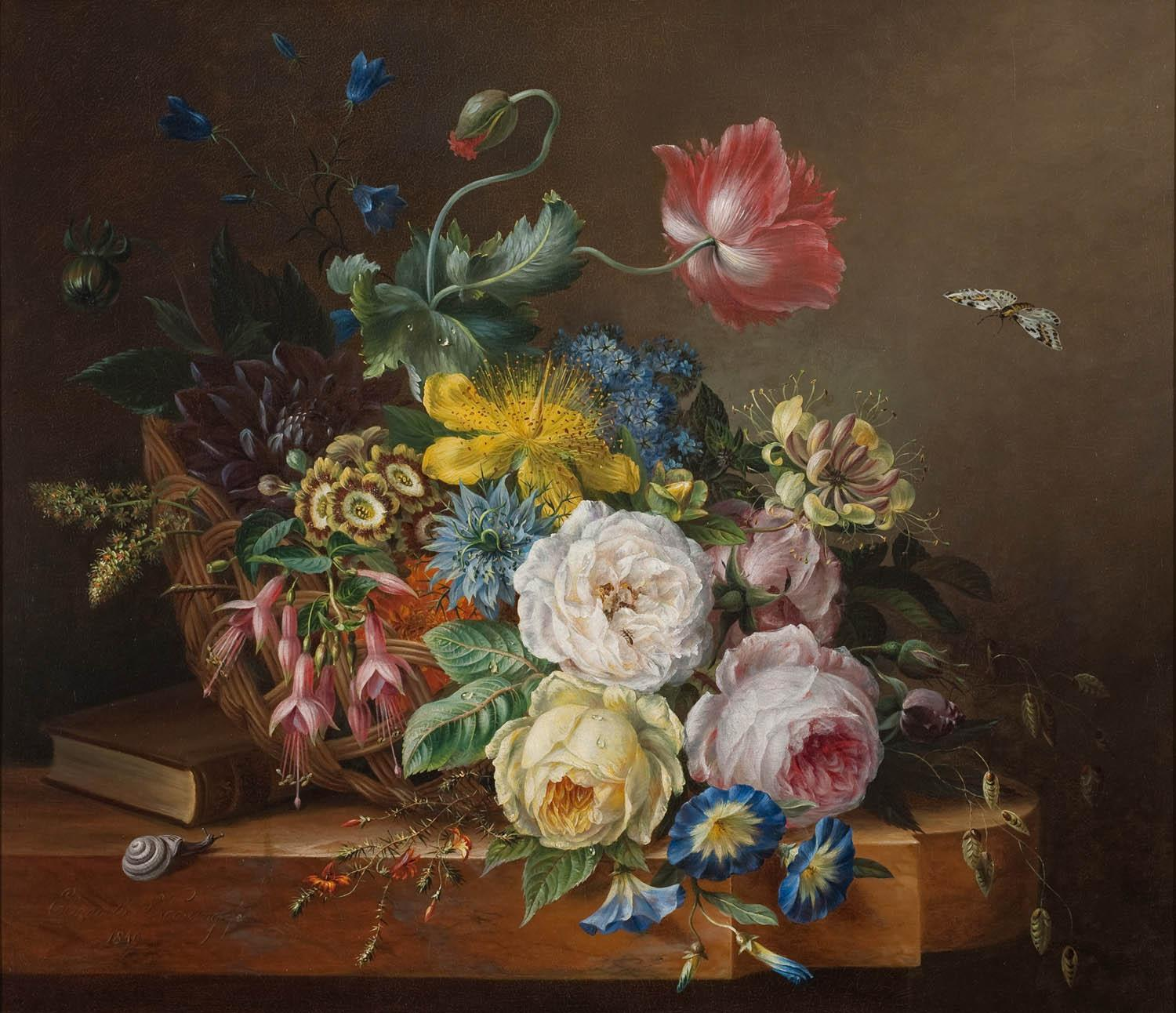
Elizabeth Koning, 1849

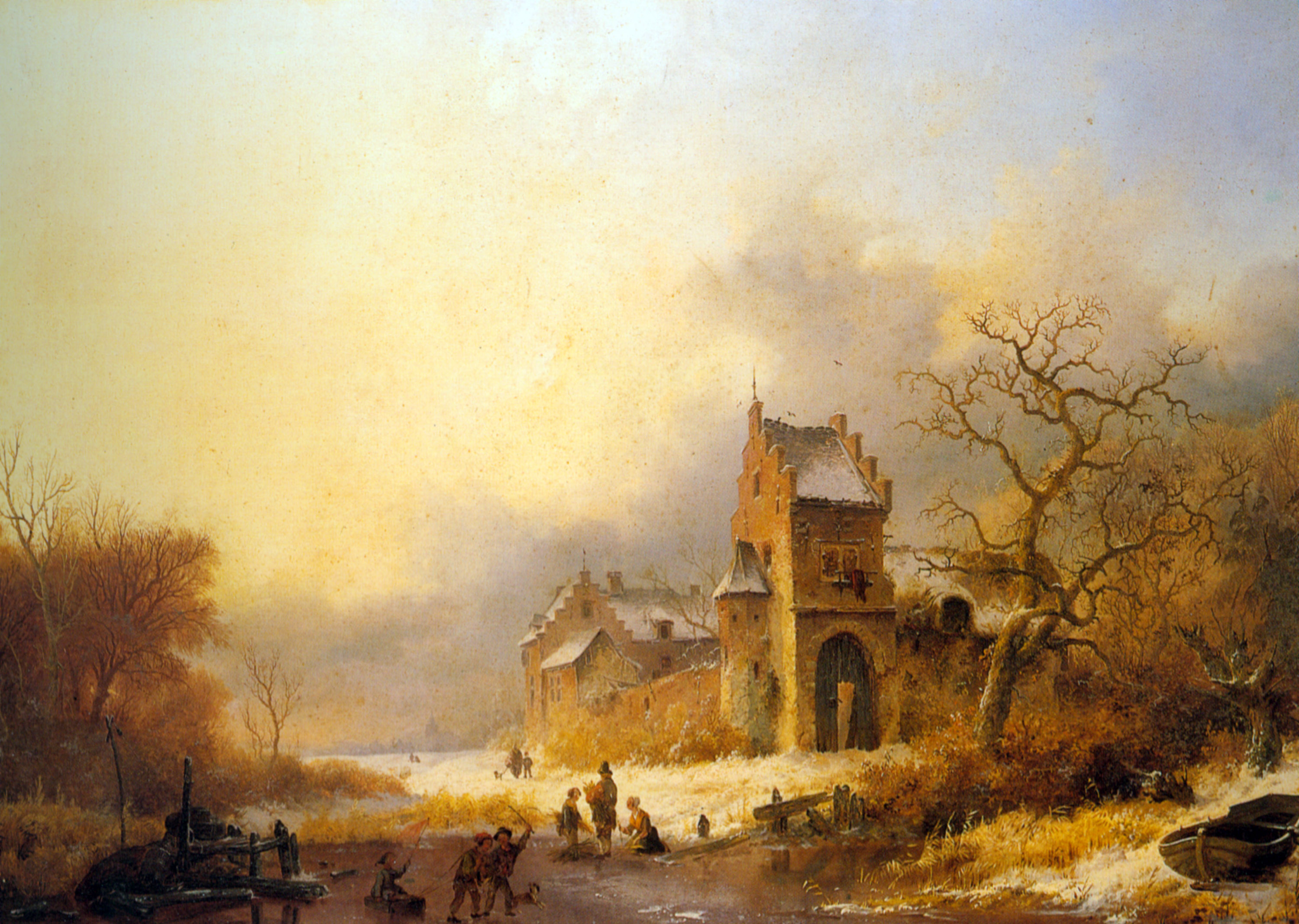
Fredrik Marinus Kruseman, 1849

- Haan, Meijer de (Amsterdam 1852 – Amsterdam 1895)
- Haanen, Adriana Johanna (Oosterhout 1814 – Oosterbeek 1895)
- Haanen, Elisabeth Alida (Utrecht 1809 – Amsterdam 1845)
- Haanen, George Gillis (Utrecht 1807 – Bilzen 1879)
- Haanen, Remigius Adrianus (Oosterhout 1812 – Bad Aussee 1894)
- Haas, Johannes Hubertus Leonardus de (Hedel 1832 – Königswinter 1908)
- Haas, Maurits Frederik Hendrik de (Rotterdam 1832 – New York City 1895)
- Haas, Willem Frederik de (Rotterdam 1830 – Faial 1880)
- Haaxman, Pieter (The Hague 1854 – Haarlem 1937)
- Hanedoes, Louwrens (Woudrichem 1822 – Woudrichem 1905)
- Hansen, Carel Lodewijk (Amsterdam 1765 – Epe 1840)
- Hansen, Lambertus Johannes (Staphorst 1803 – Amsterdam 1859)
- Hart Nibbrig, Ferdinand (Amsterdam 1866 – Laren 1915)
- Haus, Hendrik Manfried (Bergen op Zoom 1803 - Utrecht 1843)
- Heemskerck van Beest, Jacob Eduard van (Kampen 1828 – The Hague, 1894)
- Hoevenaar, Cornelis Willem (Utrecht 1802 – Utrecht 1873)
- Hoevenaar, Willem Pieter (Utrecht 1808 – Utrecht 1863)
- Hogendorp-s'Jacob, Adrienne van (Batavia 1857 – Scheveningen 1920)
- Houten, Gerrit van (Groningen 1866 – Santpoort 1934)
- Hove, Bartholomeus Johannes van (The Hague 1790 – The Hague 1880)
- Hoynck van Papendrecht, Jan (Amsterdam 1858 – The Hague 1933)
- Hove, Hubertus van (The Hague 1814 – Antwerp 1864)
- Hubrecht, Bramine (Rotterdam 1855 – Holmbury St Mary 1913)
- Hugenholtz, Arina (Cillaarshoek 1848 – Laren 1934)
- Huijsmans, Constant Cornelis (Breda 1810 – The Hague 1886)
- Hulk, Abraham, Senior (London 1813 – Zevenaar 1897)
- Hulk, Johannes Frederik (Amsterdam 1829 – Haarlem 1911)
- Israëls, Jozef (Groningen 1824 – Scheveningen 1911)
- Israëls, Isaac (Amsterdam 1865 – The Hague 1934)
- Isselt, Lucie van Dam van (Bergen op Zoom 1871 – The Hague 1949)
- Jelgerhuis, Johannes (Leeuwarden 1770 – Amsterdam 1836)
- Jongkind, Johan Barthold (Lattrop 1819 – La Côte-Saint-André 1891)
- Josselin de Jong, Pieter de (Sint-Oedenrode 1861 – The Hague 1906)
- Kaemmerer, Frederik Hendrik (The Hague 1839 – Paris 1902)
- Karsen, Eduard (Amsterdam 1860 – Amsterdam 1941)
- Karsen, Kasparus (Amsterdam 1810 – Bieberich 1896)
- Kate, Herman Frederik Carel ten (Amsterdam 1837 – Amsterdam 1894)
- Keulemans, Johannes Gerardus (Rotterdam 1842 – Essex 1912)
- Kever, Hein (Amsterdam 1854 – Amsterdam 1922)
- Kiers, Petrus (Meppel 1807 – Amsterdam 1875)
- Kikkert, Jan Elias (Amsterdam 1843 – Leiden 1925)
- Kleijn, Pieter Rudolph (Hooge Zwaluwe 1785 – Leiden 1816)
- Klinkenberg, Johannes Christiaan Karel (The Hague 1852 – The Hague 1924)
- Knip, Henriëtte Geertruida (Tilburg 1783 – Haarlem 1843)
- Knip, Joseph August (Tilburg 1777 – Berlicum 1847)
- Koekkoek, Barend Cornelis (Middelburg 1803 – Cleves 1862)
- Koekkoek, Hendrik Pieter (Hilversum 1843 – England 1890s)
- Koekkoek, Hermanus (Middelburg 1815 – Haarlem 1882)
- Koekkoek, Hermanus Willem (Amsterdam 1867 – Amsterdam 1929)
- Koekkoek, Johannes Hermanus (Veere 1778 – Amsterdam 1851)
- Koekkoek, Johannes Hermanus Barend (Amsterdam 1840 – Hilversum 1912)
- Koekkoek, Marinus Adrianus (Middelburg 1807 – Amsterdam 1868)
- Koekkoek, Willem (Amsterdam 1839 – Niewer-Amstel 1885)
- Koekkoek-Daiwaille, Elise Thérèse (Amsterdam 1814 – Koblenz 1881)
- Koelman, Jan Philip (The Hague 1818 – The Hague 1893)
- Koning, Elisabeth Johanna (Haarlem 1816 – Rotterdam 1887)
- Koster, Everhardus (The Hague 1817 – Dordrecht 1892)
- Koster, Jo (Kampen 1868 - Heelsum 1944)
- Krieghoff, Cornelius (Amsterdam 1815 – Chicago 1872)
- Kruseman, Cornelis (Amsterdam 1797 – Lisse 1857)
- Kruseman, Jan Adam (Haarlem 1804 – Haarlem 1862)
- Kruseman van Elten, Hendrik Dirk (Alkmaar 1823 – Paris 1904)

=== L-R ===
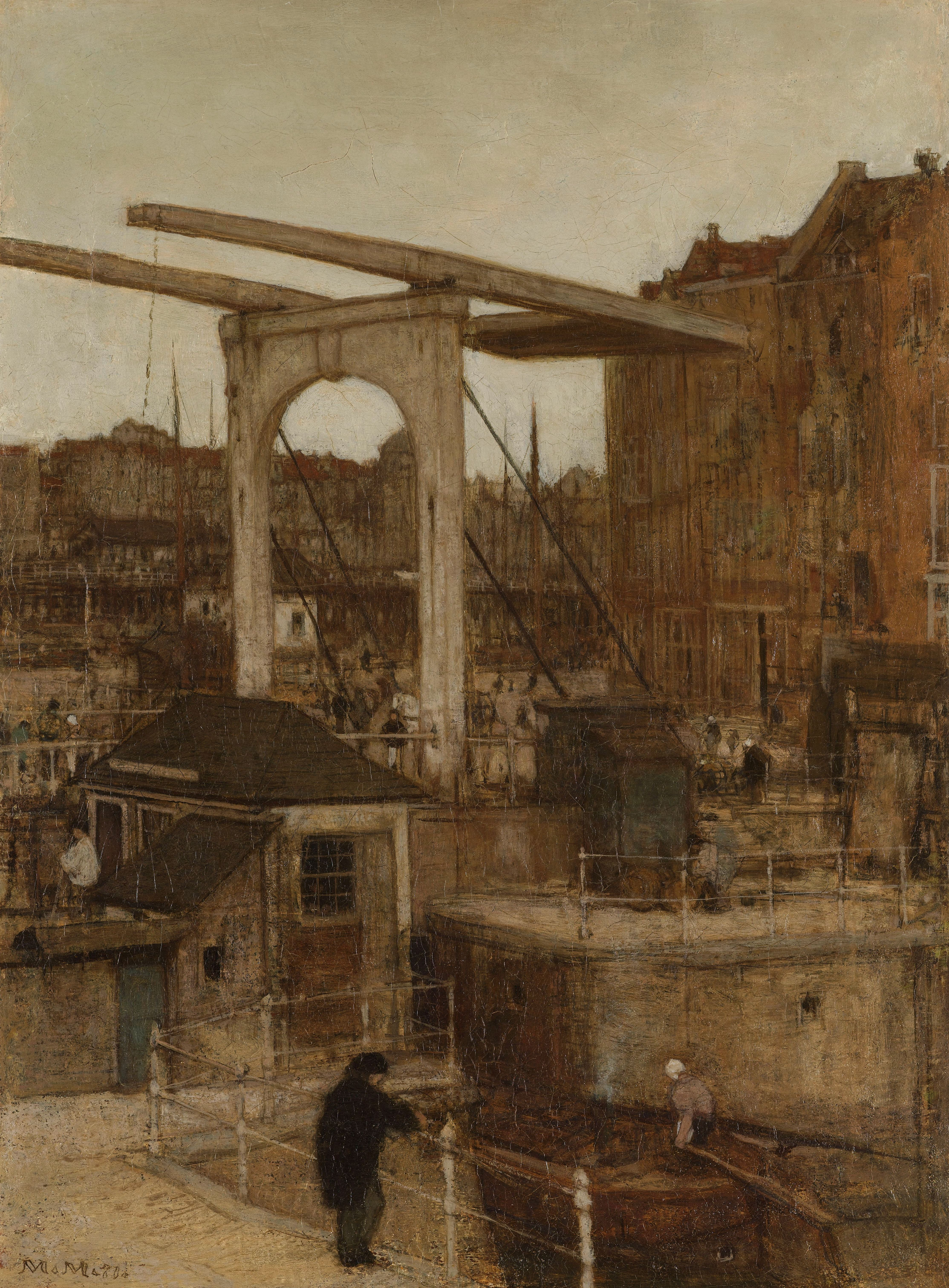
Jacob Henricus Maris, 1880

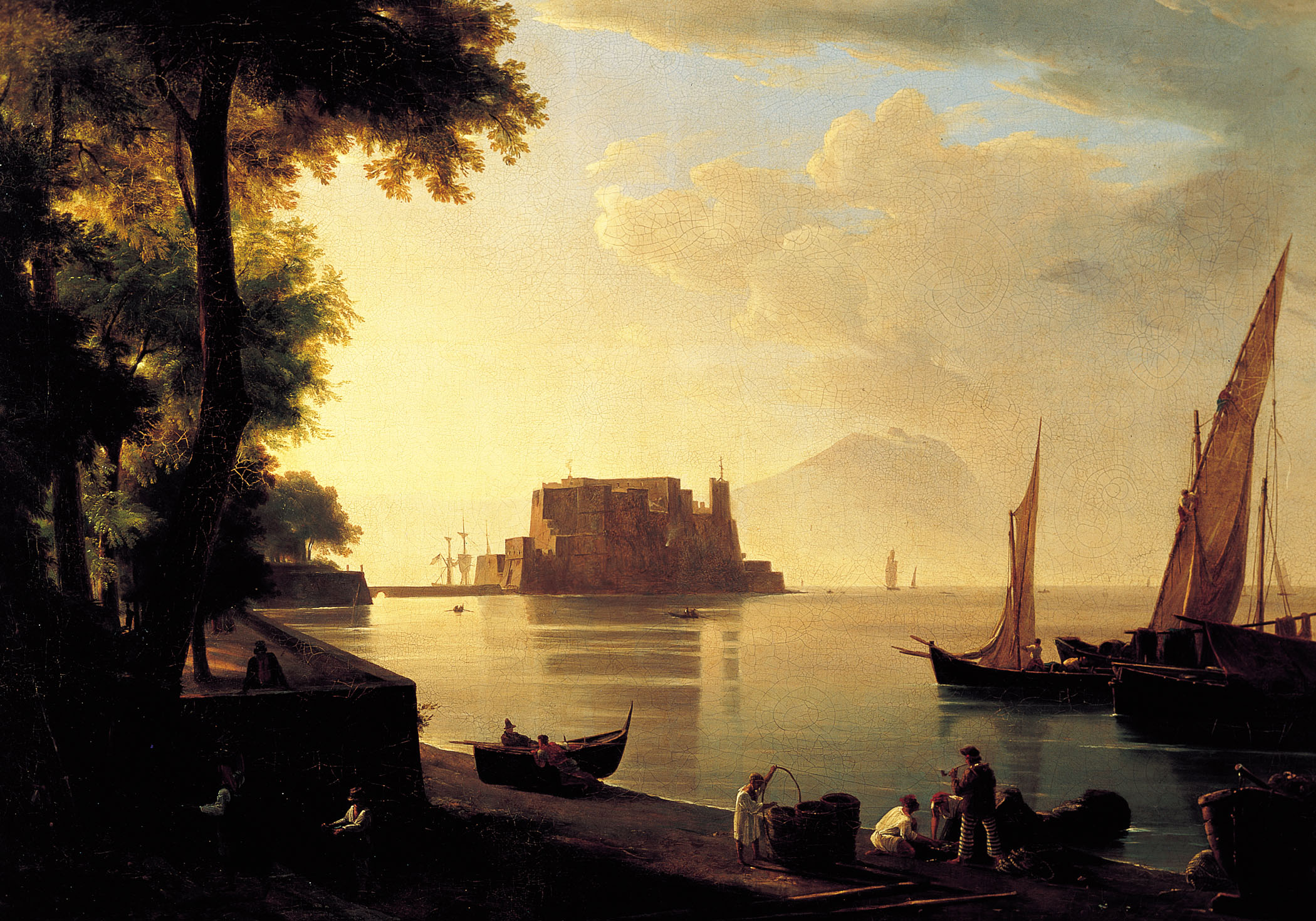
Antonie Sminck Pitloo, c.1820

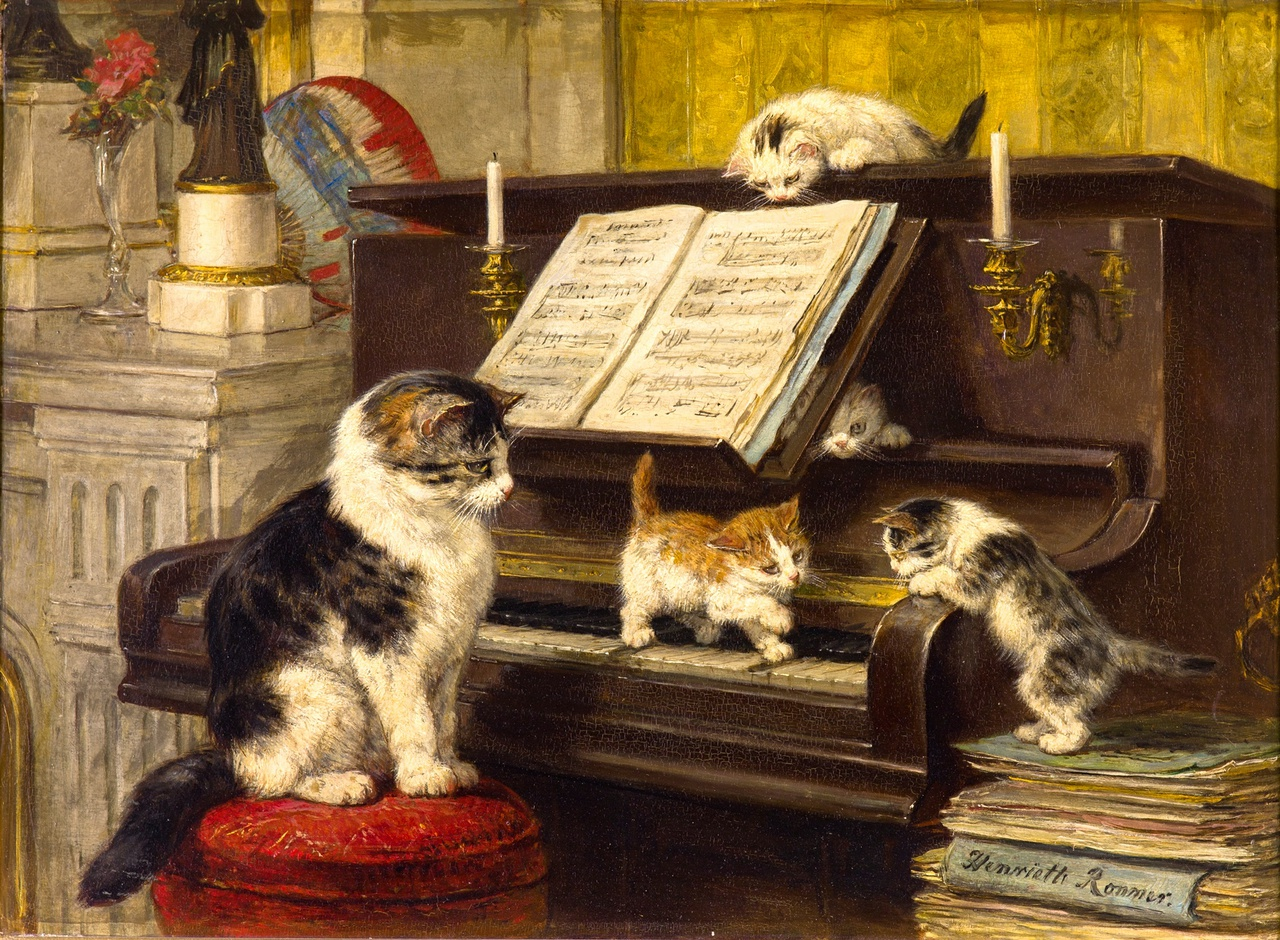
Henriëtte Ronner-Knip, 1897

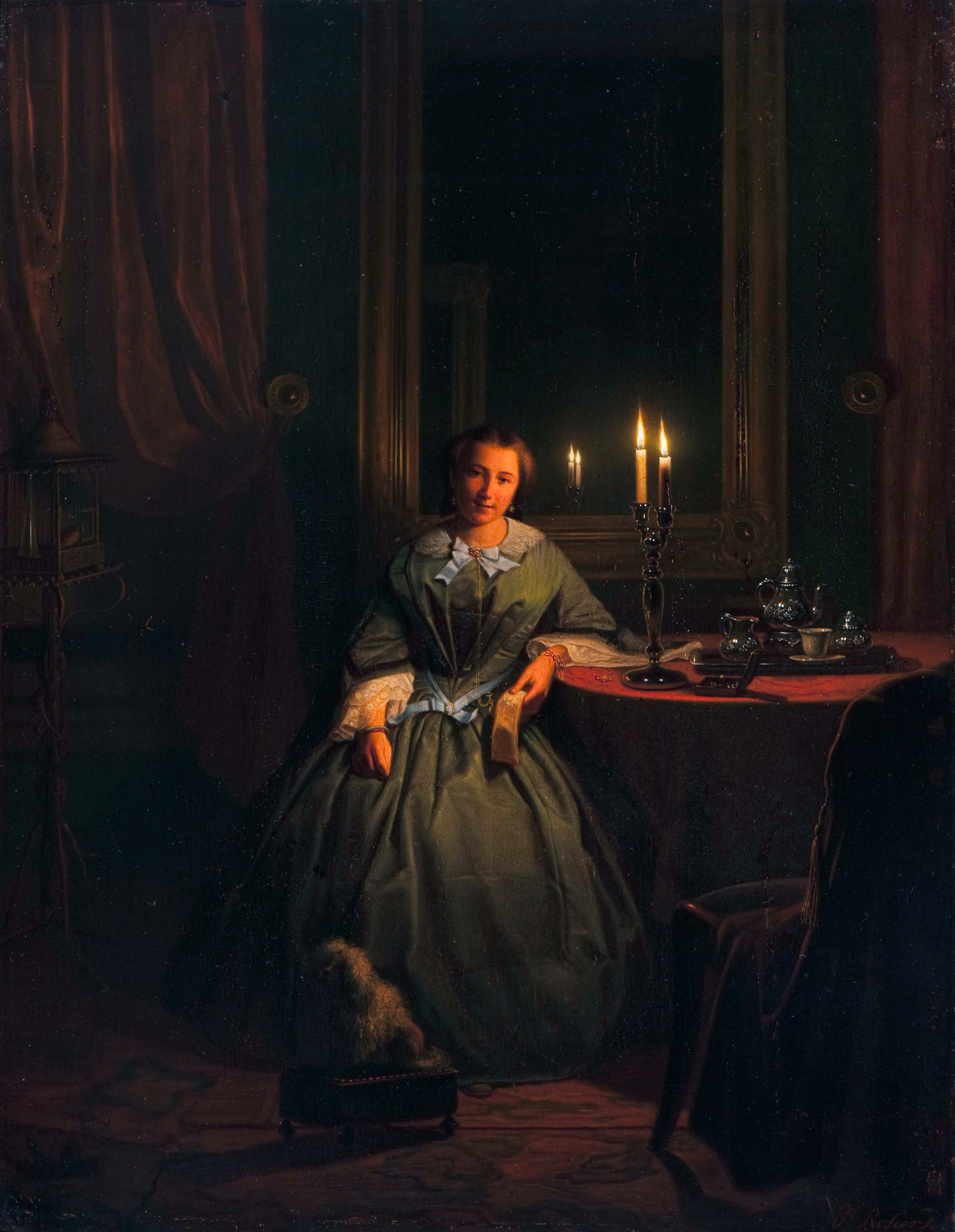
Johannes Rosierse, c. 1860

- Lamme, Arie Johannes (Dordrecht 1812 – Berg en Dal 1900)
- Leickert, Charles (Brussels 1816 – Mainz 1907)
- Linssen, Henri (Roermond 1805 – Roermond 1869)
- Looy, Jacobus van (Haarlem 1855 – Haarlem 1930)
- Maaten, Jacob Jan van der (Elburg 1820 – Apeldoorn 1879)
- Maris, Jacob (The Hague 1837 – Karlsbad 1899)
- Maris, Matthijs (The Hague 1839 – London 1917)
- Maris, Willem (The Hague 1844 – The Hague 1910)
- Maris, Grada Hermina (Hengelo 1854 – The Hague 1919)
- Mauve, Anton (Zaandam 1838 – Arnhem 1888)
- Meijer, Louis (Amsterdam 1809 – Utrecht 1866)
- Meijer de Haan, Isaäc de (Amsterdam 1852 – Amsterdam 1895)
- Mesdag, Hendrik Willem (Groningen 1831 – The Hague 1915)
- Mesdag, Taco (Groningen 1829 – The Hague 1902)
- Mesdag-van Calcar, Geesje (Hoogezand 1850 – The Hague 1936)
- Mesdag-van Houten, Sina (Groningen 1834 – The Hague 1909)
- Michaëlis, Gerrit Jan (Amsterdam 1775 – Haarlem 1857)
- Moes, Wally (Amsterdam 1856 – Laren 1918)
- Mol, Woutherus (Haarlem 1785 – Haarlem 1857)
- Mollinger, Alexander (Utrecht 1836 – Utrecht 1867)
- Mooy, Jan (Callantsoog 1776 – Den Helder 1847)
- Muller, Gerard (Amsterdam 1861 – Amsterdam 1929)
- Neuhuys, Albert (Utrecht 1844 – Locarno 1914)
- Neuman, Clasine (Amsterdam 1851 – The Hague 1908)
- Nuijen, Wijnand (The Hague 1813 – The Hague 1839)
- Oort, Hendrik van (Utrecht 1775 – Utrecht 1847)
- Os, Georgius Jacobus Johannes van (The Hague 1782 – Paris 1861)
- Os, Pieter Frederik van (Amsterdam 1808 – Haarlem 1892)
- Os, Pieter Gerardus van (The Hague 1776 – The Hague 1839)
- Oever, Albarta ten (Groningen 1771 – Groningen 1854)
- Oyens, David (Amsterdam 1842 – Brussels 1902)
- Oyens, Pieter (Amsterdam 1842 – Brussels 1894)
- Pieneman, Jan Willem (Abcoude 1779 – Amsterdam 1853)
- Pieneman, Nicolaas (Amersfoort 1809 – Amsterdam 1860)
- Pieters, Evert (Amsterdam 1856 – Laren 1932)
- Pitloo, Antonie Sminck (Arnhem 1790 – Naples 1837)
- Poggenbeek, George (Amsterdam 1853 – Amsterdam 1903)
- Prooijen, Albert Jurardus van (Groningen 1834 – Amsterdam 1898)
- Rappard, Anthon van (Zeist 1858 – Santpoort 1892)
- Ravenswaay, Adriana van (Hilversum 1816 – Hilversum 1872)
- Ravenswaay, Jan van (Hilversum 1789 – Hilversum 1869)
- Reekers, Hendrik (Haarlem 1815 – Haarlem 1854)
- Repelius, Betsy (Amsterdam 1848 – Amsterdam 1921)
- Robertson, Suze (The Hague 1855 – The Hague 1922)
- Rochussen, Charles (Rotterdam 1814 – Rotterdam 1894)
- Roelofs, Willem (Amsterdam 1822 – Berchem 1897)
- Roeters van Lennep, Catharina Julia (Amsterdam 1813 – Amsterdam 1883)
- Ronner-Knip, Henriette (Amsterdam 1821 – Elsene 1909)
- Roosenboom, Margaretha (The Hague 1843 – Voorburg 1896)
- Roosenboom, Nicolaas Johannes (Schellingwoude 1805 – Assen 1880)

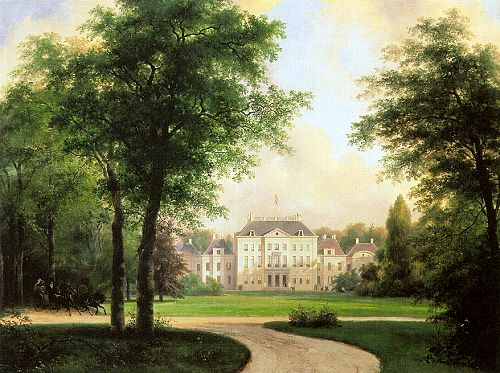
Andreas Schelfhout, 1838

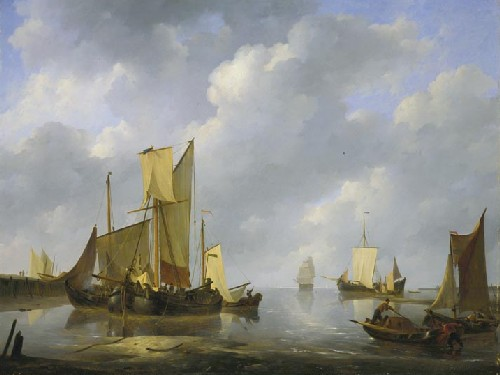
Johannes Christiaan Schotel, 1822

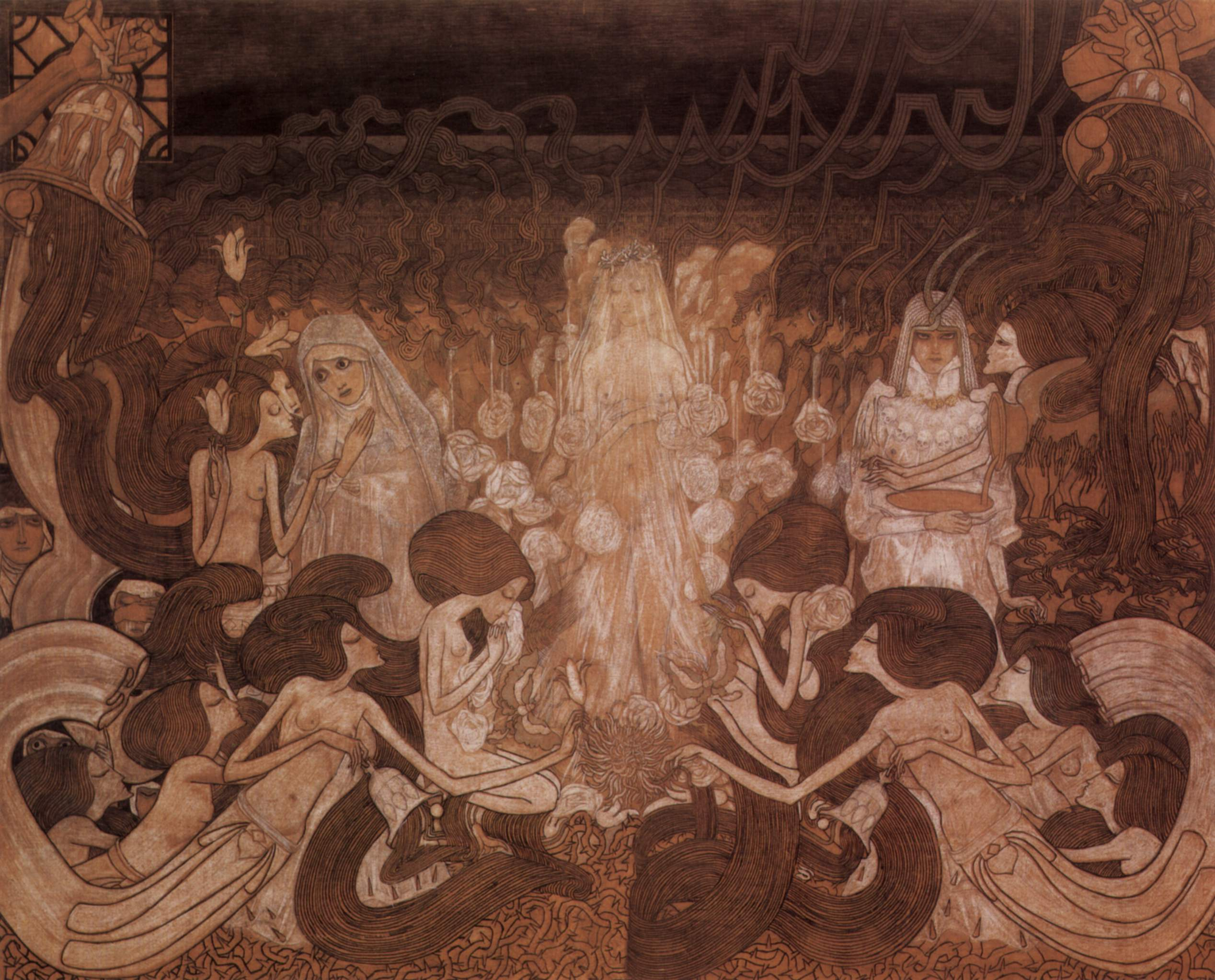
Jan Toorop, 1893

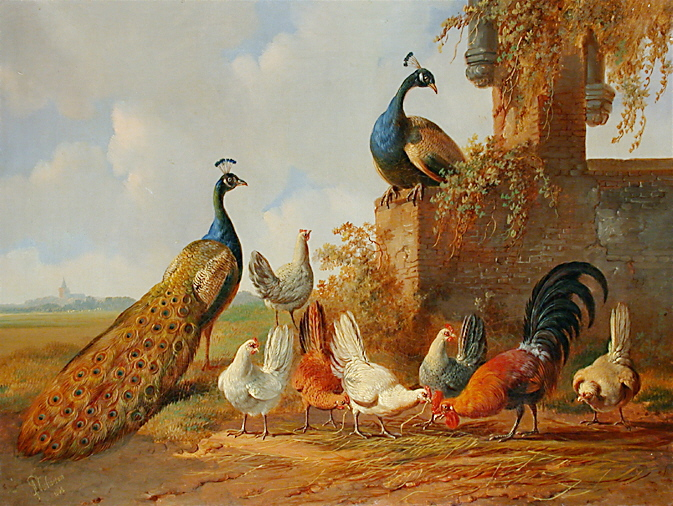
Albertus Verhoesen, 1882

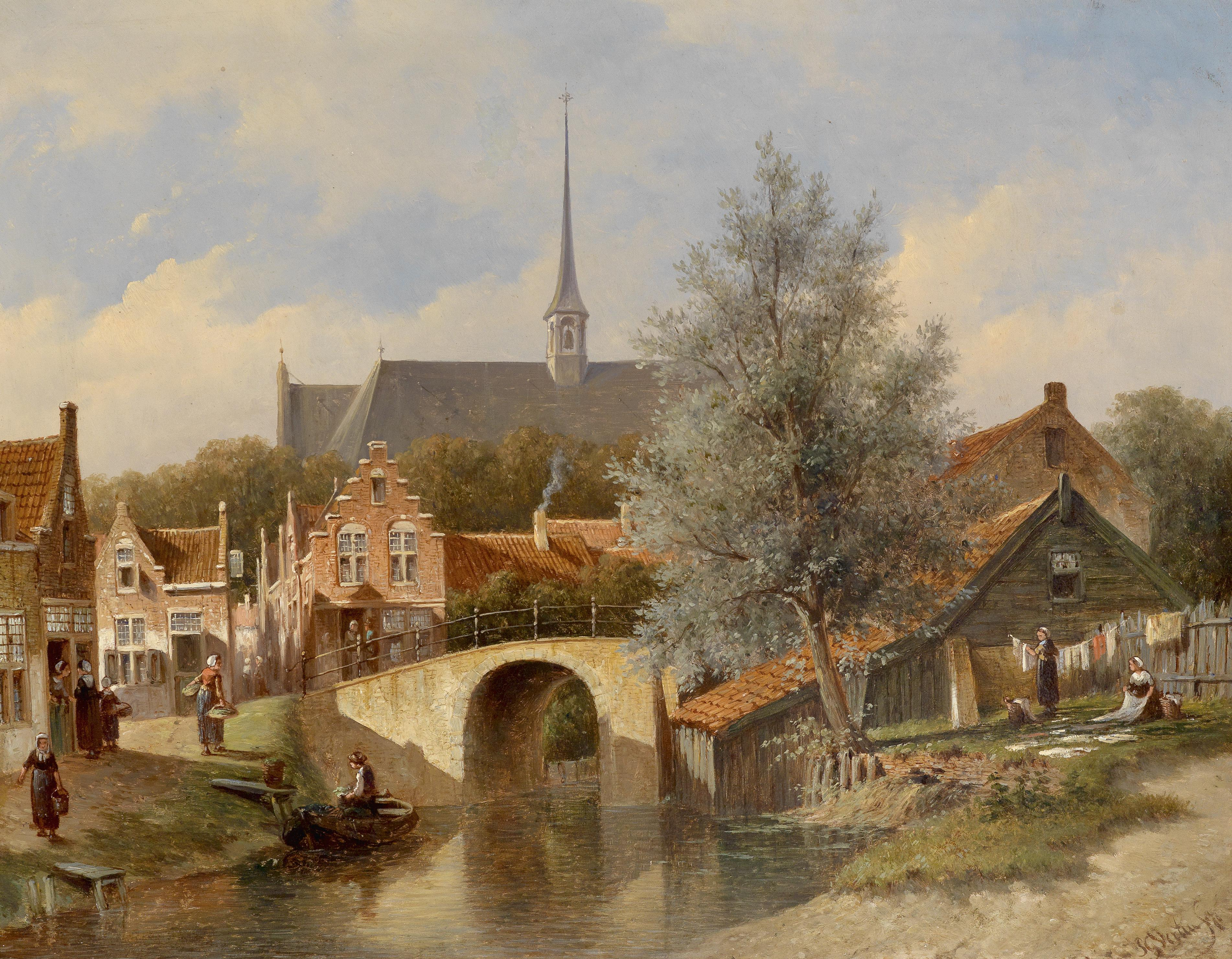
Pieter Gerard Vertin, 1871

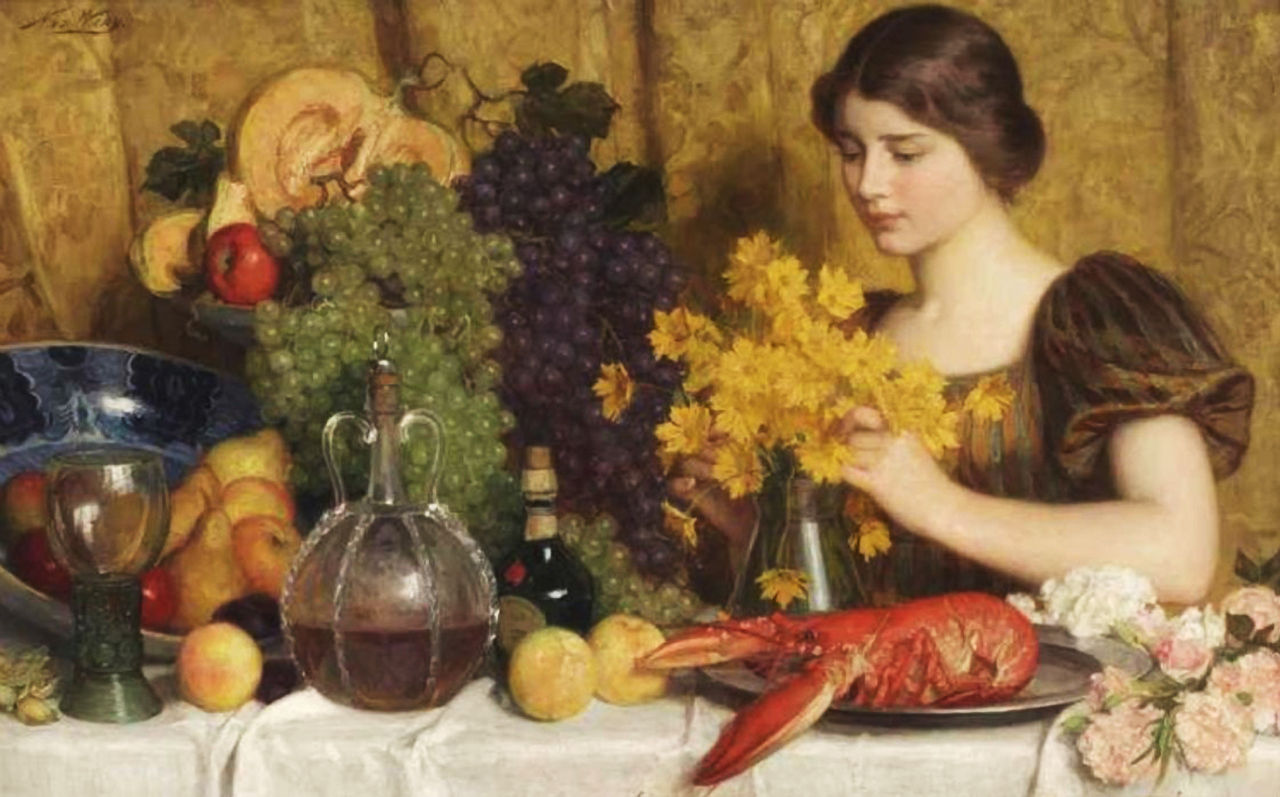
Nicolaas van der Waay, 1890s

=== S-Z ===
- Sadée, Philip (The Hague 1837 – The Hague 1904)
- Sande Bakhuyzen, Gerardine van de (The Hague 1827 – The Hague 1895)
- Sande Bakhuyzen, Hendrikus van de (The Hague 1795 – The Hague 1860)
- Sande Bakhuyzen, Julius van de (The Hague 1835 – The Hague 1925)
- Scheffer, Ary (Dordrecht 1795 – Argenteuil 1858)
- Scheffer, Cornelia (Dordrecht 1769 – Paris 1839)
- Scheffer, Hendrik (The Hague 1798 – Paris 1858)
- Schelfhout, Andreas (The Hague 1787 – The Hague 1870)
- Scheltema, Jan Hendrik (The Hague 1861 – Brisbane 1941)
- Schendel, Petrus van (Terheijden 1806 – Brussels 1870)
- Fritz Schiller, Amsterdam (1886 – 1971)
- Schmetterling, Elisabeth Barbara (Amsterdam 1801 – Amsterdam 1881)
- Schoemaker Doyer, Jacobus (Crefeld 1792 – Zutphen 1867)
- Scholten, Hendrik Jacobus (Amsterdam 1824 – Heemstede 1907)
- Schot, Francina Louise (Rotterdam 1816 – Schaerbeek 1894)
- Schotel, Johannes Christiaan (Dordrecht 1787 – Dordrecht 1838)
- Schotel, Petrus Johannes (Dordrecht 1808 – Dresden 1865)
- Schouman, Martinus (Dordrecht 1770 – Breda 1848)
- Schwartze, Thérèse (Amsterdam 1851 – Amsterdam 1918)
- Smit, Joseph (Lisse 1836 – Radlett 1929)
- Smits, Jacob (Rotterdam 1855 – Achterbos-Sluis 1928)
- Snabilie, Maria Geertruida (Haarlem 1776 – Haarlem 1838)
- Spohler, Jan Jacob Coenraad (Amsterdam 1837 – Amsterdam 1894)
- Spohler, Johannes Franciscus (Rotterdam 1853 – Amsterdam 1923)
- Springer, Cornelis (Amsterdam 1817 – Hilversum 1891)
- Steelink, Willem (Amsterdam 1856 – Voorburg 1928)
- Storm van 's-Gravesande, Carel Nicolaas (Breda 1841 – The Hague 1924)
- Stroebel, Johannes Anthonie Balthasar (The Hague 1821 – Leiden 1905)
- Suij, Pauline (Amersfoort 1863 – Amsterdam 1949)
- Teerlink, Abraham (Dordrecht 1776 – Rome 1857)
- Toorop, Jan (Purworedjo, Java 1858 – The Hague 1928)
- Troostwijk, Wouter Johannes van (Amsterdam 1782 – Amsterdam 1810)
- Velde, Charles William Meredith van de (Leeuwarden 1818 – Menton 1898)
- Velden, Petrus van der (Rotterdam 1837 – Auckland 1913)
- Verschuur, Wouterus (Amsterdam 1812 – Vorden 1874)
- Verster, Floris (Leiden 1861 – Leiden 1927)
- Verveer, Salomon (The Hague 1813 – Tha Hague 1876)
- Veth, Jan (Dordrecht 1864 – Amsterdam 1925)
- Vogel, Johannes Gijsbert (Hooge Zwaluwe 1828 – Velp 1915)
- Voogd, Hendrik (Amsterdam 1768 – Rome 1839)
- Vos, Hubert (Maastricht 1855 – New York 1935)
- Vos, Maria (Amsterdam 1824 – Oosterbeek 1906)
- Waay, Nicolaas van der (Amsterdam 1855 – Amsterdam 1936)
- Waldorp, Anthonie (The Hague 1803 – Amsterdam 1866)
- Weele, Herman Johannes van der (Middelburg 1852 – The Hague 1930)
- Weissenbruch, Jan (The Hague 1822 – The Hague 1880)
- Weissenbruch, Jan Hendrik (The Hague 1824 – The Hague 1903)
- Wijnveld, Barend (Amsterdam 1820 – Haarlem 1902)
- Wijsmuller, Jan Hillebrand (Amsterdam 1855 – Amsterdam 1925)
- Witkamp, Ernst (Amsterdam 1854 – Amsterdam 1897)
- Witsen, Willem (Amsterdam 1860 – Amsterdam 1923)
- Wonder, Pieter Christoffel (Utrecht 1780 – Amsterdam 1852)
- Zilcken, Philip (The Hague 1857 – Villefranche-sur-Mer 1930)
- Zwart, Willem de (The Hague 1862 – The Hague 1931)

== 20th century ==
=== A-F ===
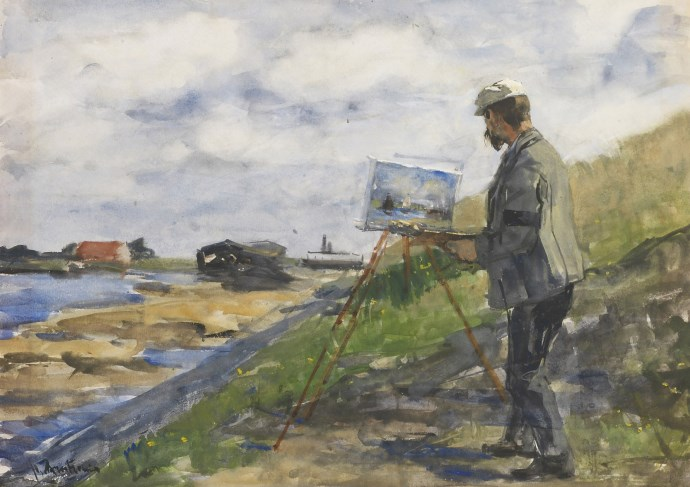
Floris Arntzenius, c. 1900

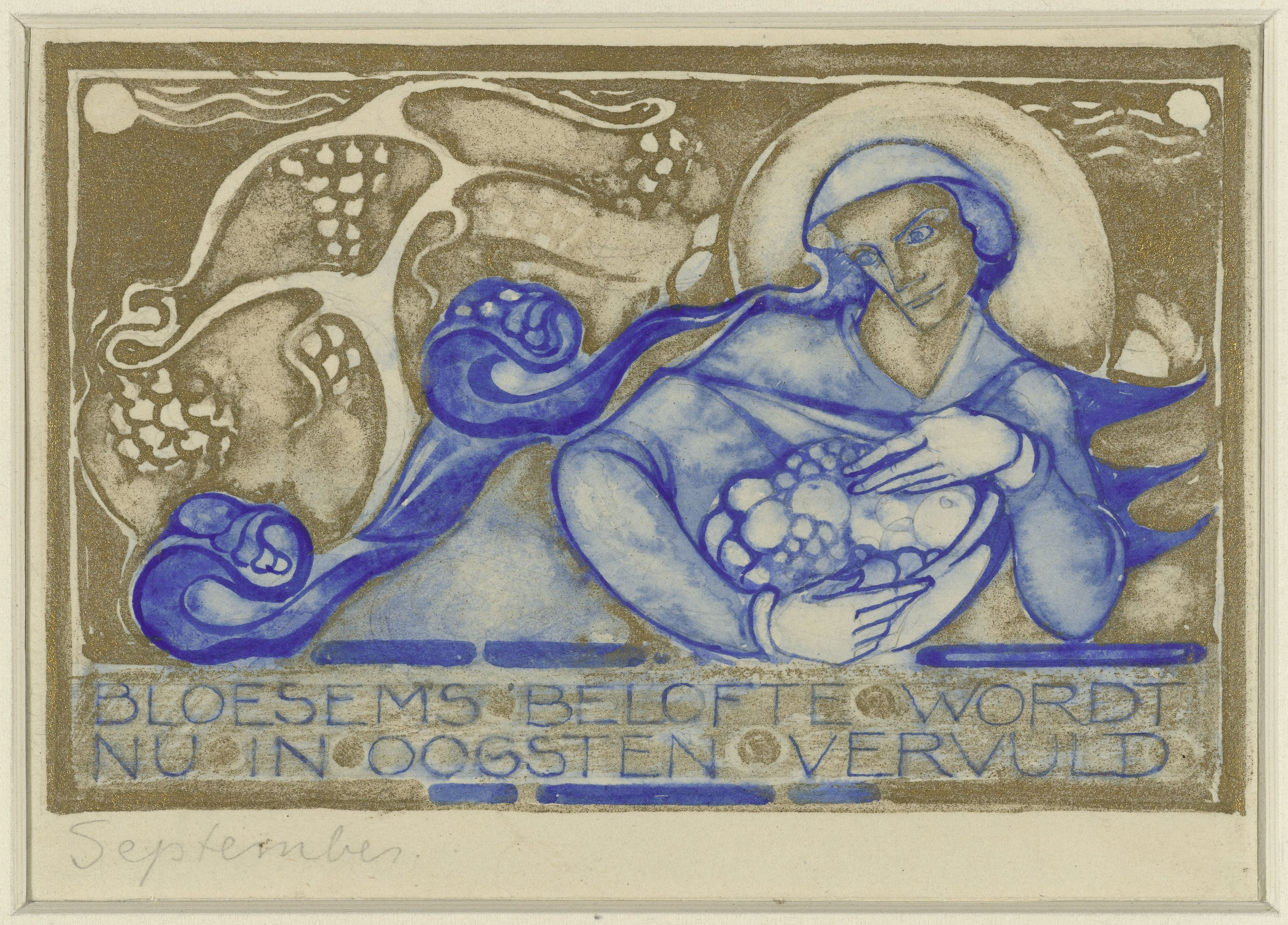
Willem Arondeus, c. 1929

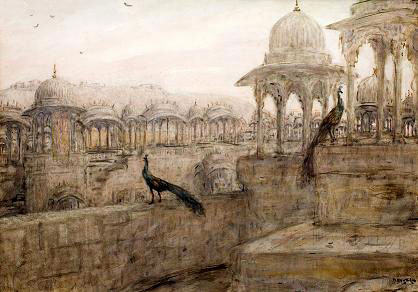
Marius Bauer, c. 1920

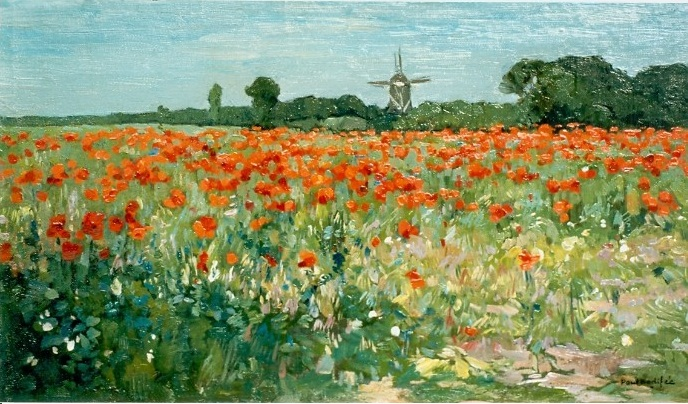
Paul Bodifée, c. 1900

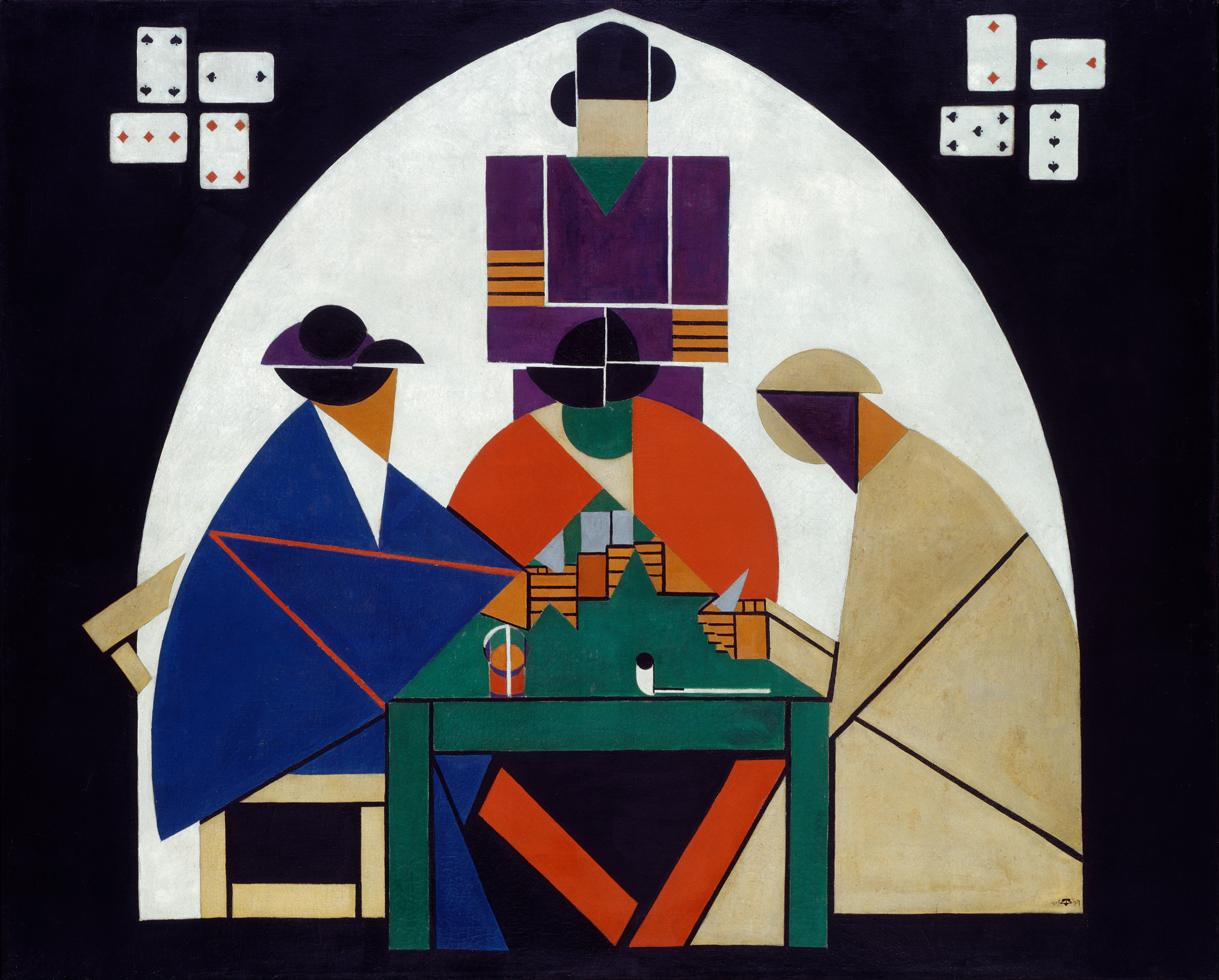
Theo van Doesburg, 1916/17

- Adolfs, Gerard Pieter (Semarang 1897 – Den Bosch 1968)
- Akkeringa, Johannes Evert Hendrik (Bangka 1861 – Amersfoort 1942)
- Altink, Jan (Groningen 1885 – The Hague 1971)
- Ansingh, Lizzy (Utrecht 1875 – Amsterdam 1959)
- Appel, Karel (Amsterdam 1921 – Zürich 2006)
- Armando (Amsterdam 1929 – Potsdam 2018)
- Arntzenius, Floris (Surabaya 1864 – The Hague 1925)
- Bach, Franciscus Hermanus (Groningen 1865 – Groningen 1956)
- Balth, Carel (Rotterdam 1939)
- Bastin, Marjolein (Loenen aan de Vecht 1943)
- Bauer, Jo (Amsterdam 1873 – Amsterdam 1964)
- Bauer, Marius (The Hague 1867 – Amsterdam 1932)
- Beek, Bernard van (Amsterdam 1875 – Kortenhoef 1941)
- Berkemeier, Ludolph (Tilburg 1864 – Noordwijk 1930)
- Berens, Chris (Oss 1976)
- Bikkers, Rudolf (Hilversum 1943)
- Bogart, Bram (Delft 1921 – Sint-Truiden 2012)
- Bol, Kees (Oegstgeest 1916 – Waalwijk 2009)
- Bol, Henri (Eindhoven 1945 – Den Bosch 2000)
- Bouter, Henk de (1968)
- Breman, Co (Zwolle 1865 – Laren 1938)
- Bolsius, Charles, (Den Bosch 1907 – Tucson, Arizona 1983)
- Broeckman, Anne Marinus (1874–1946)
- Bruckman, Lodewijk (The Hague 1903 – Leeuwarden 1995)
- Bruna, Dick (Utrecht 1927 – Utrecht 2017)
- Chabot, Henk (Sprang-Capelle 1894 – Rotterdam 1949)
- Citroen, Paul (Berlin 1896 – Wassenaar 1983)
- Constant (Amsterdam 1921 – Utrecht 2005)
- Corneille (Liège 1922 – Paris 2010)
- Cox, Jan (The Hague 1919 – Antwerp 1980)
- De Leeuw, Judith (1994/1995)
- Does, Willem Jan Pieter van der (Rotterdam 1889 - Zeist 1966)
- Daniëls, René (Eindhoven 1950)
- Deutmann, Franz (Zwolle 1867 – Blaricum 1915)
- Doesburg, Theo van (Utrecht 1883 – Davos 1931)
- Doorn, Tinus van (Padang 1905 – Uccle 1940)
- Doeve, Eppo (Bandung 1907 – Amsterdam 1981)
- Domela Nieuwenhuis, César (Amsterdam 1900 – Paris 1992)
- Dongen, Kees van (Delfshaven 1877 – Monte Carlo 1968)
- Dumas, Marlene (Cape Town 1953)
- Eeden, Marcel van (The Hague 1965)
- Escher, Maurits Cornelis (Leeuwarden 1898 – Hilversum 1972)
- Eyck, Charles (Meerssen 1898 – Schimmert 1972)
- Fernhout, Edgar (Bergen 1912 – Bergen 1974)
- Filarski, Dirk (Amsterdam 1885 – Zeist 1964)
- Frankot, Roelof (Meppel 1911 – Raalte 1984)

=== G-L ===
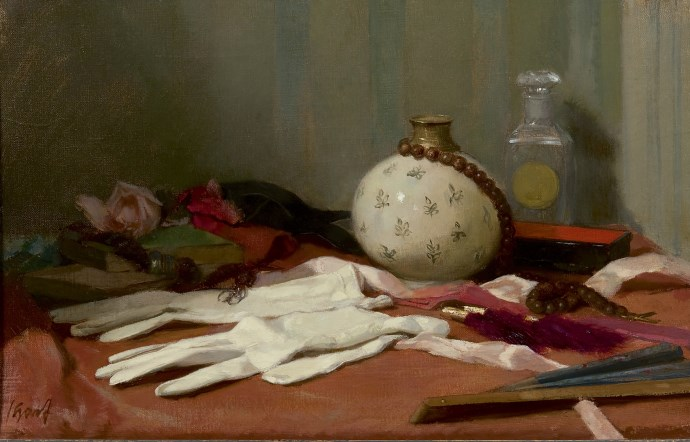
Salomon Garf, 1920s

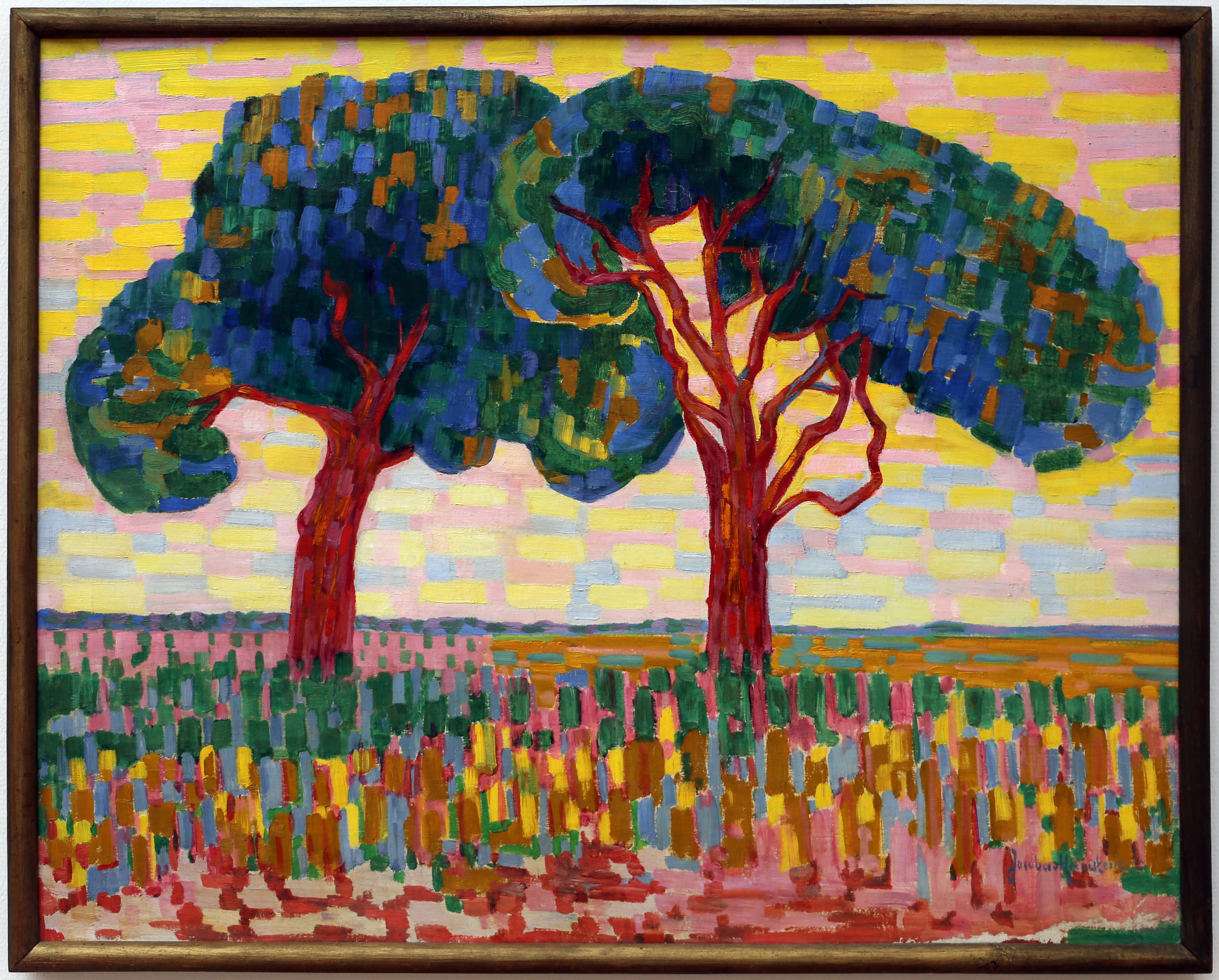
Jacoba van Heemskerck, 1908–10

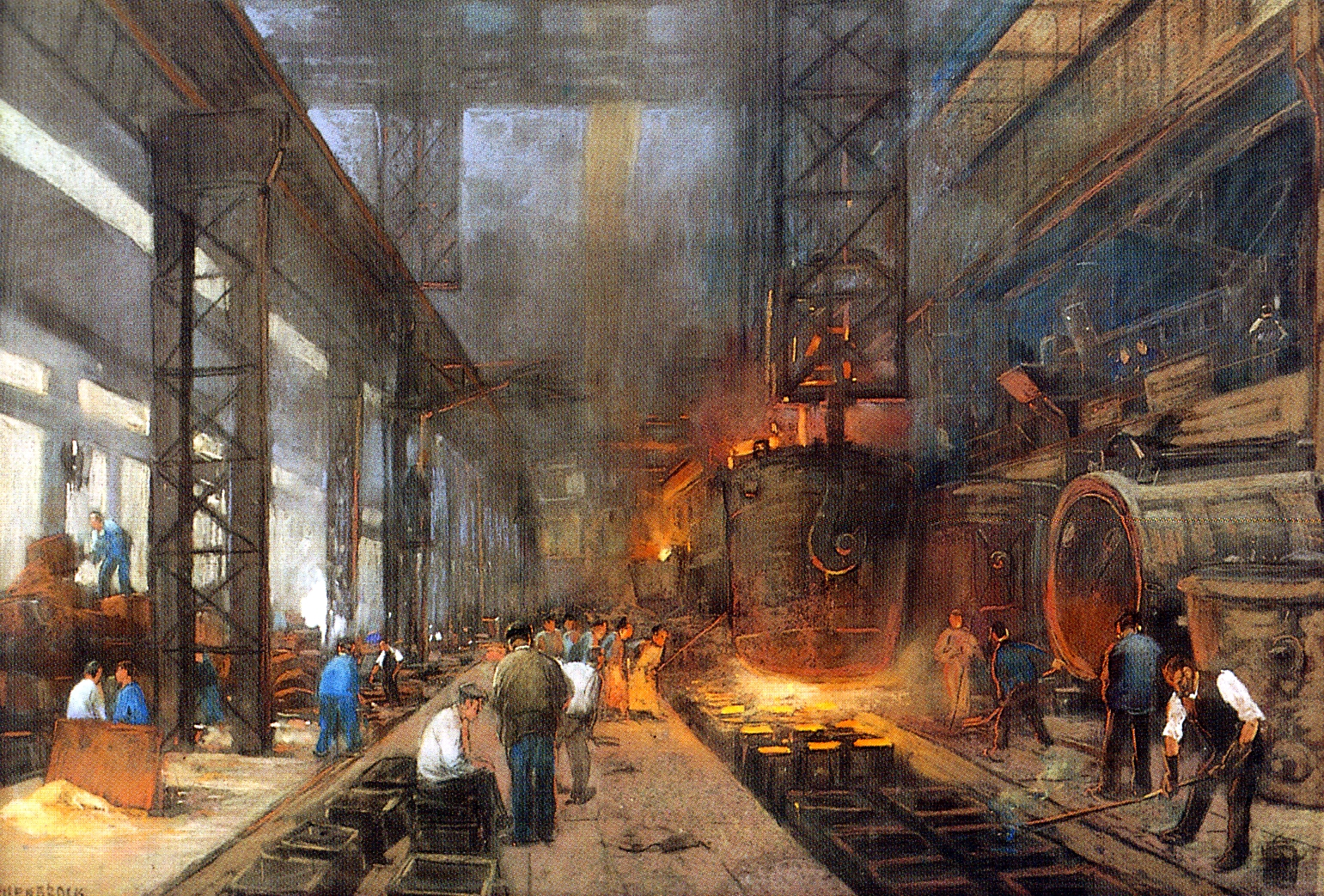
Herman Heijenbrock, 1890

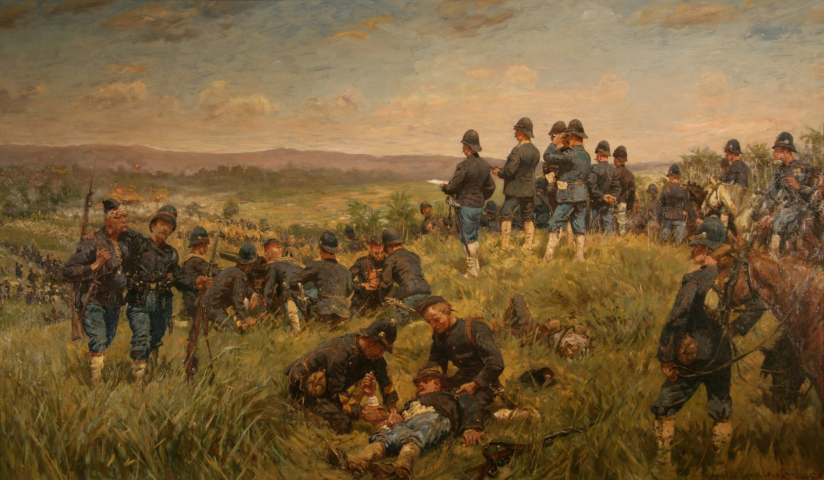
Jan Hoynck van Papendrecht, 1901

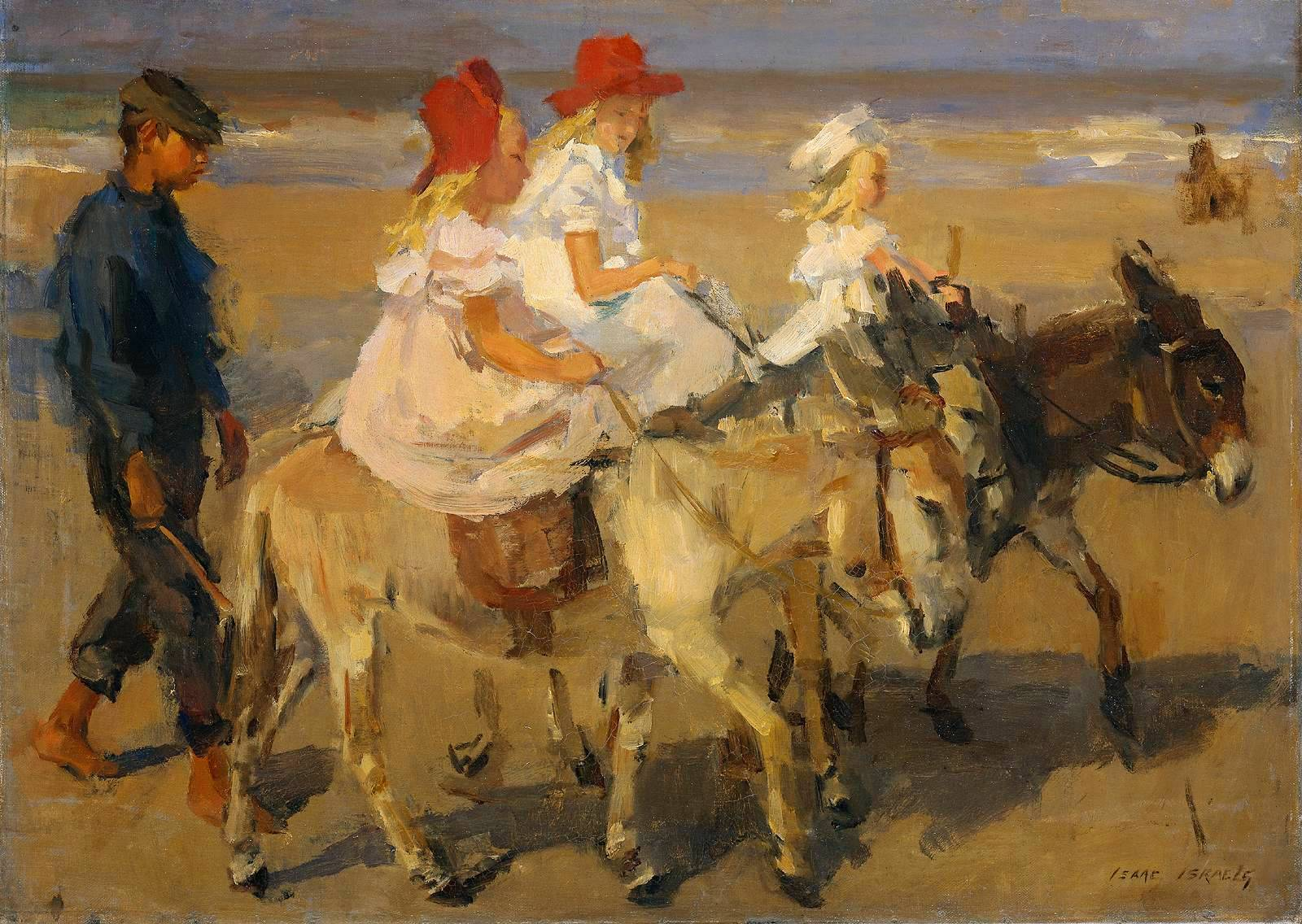
Isaac Israëls, 1900

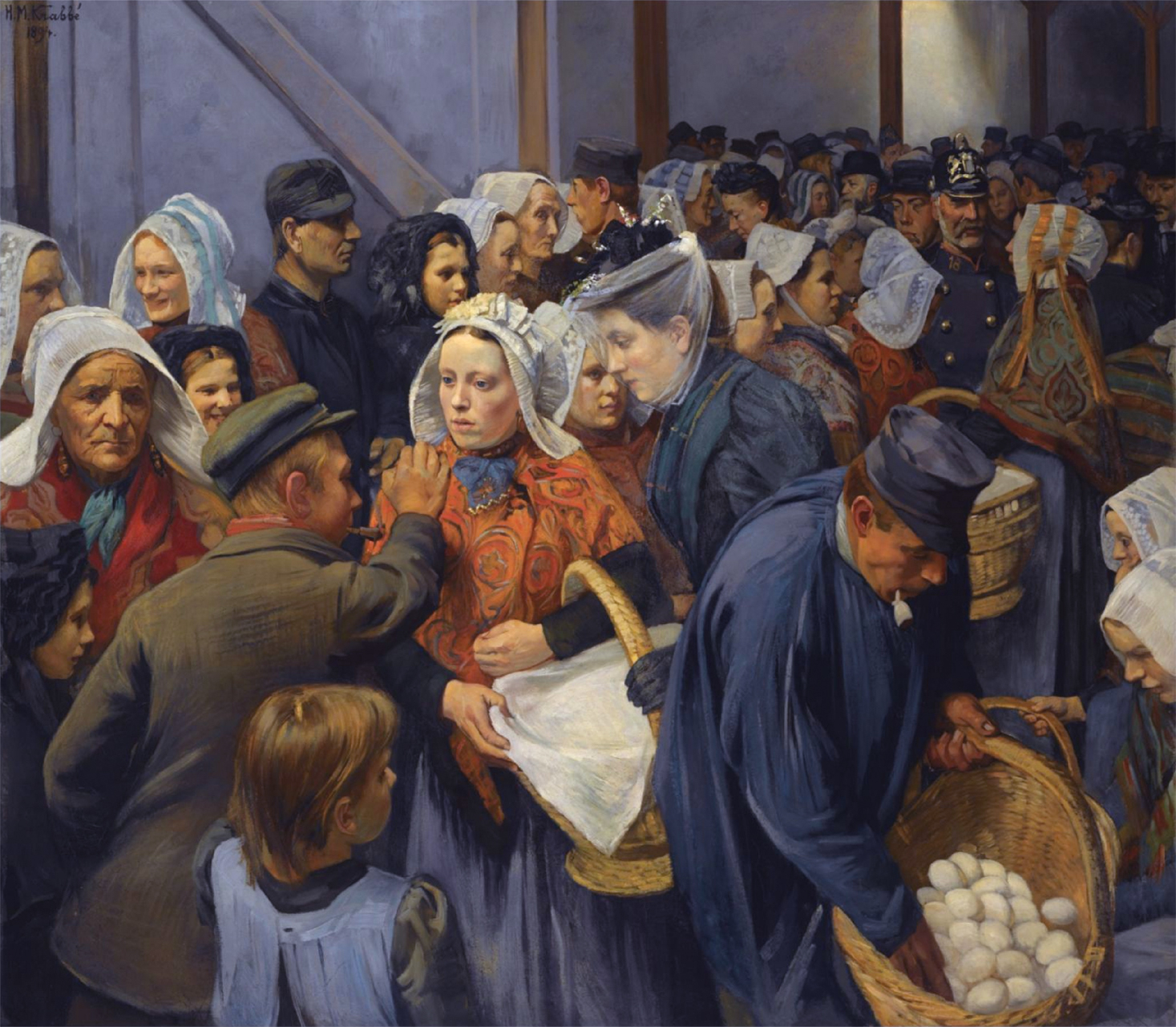
Hendrik Maarten Krabbé, 1894

- Garf, Salomon (Amsterdam 1879 – Auschwitz 1943)
- Gebski, Ed (Heerlen 1959)
- Genk, Willem van (Voorburg 1921 – The Hague 2005)
- Gestel, Leo (Woerden 1881 – Hilversum 1941)
- Gildemeester, Anna (Amsterdam 1867 – Florence 1945)
- Goede, Jules de (Rotterdam 1937 – London 2007)
- Golden, Daan van (Katendrecht 1936 – Schiedam 2017)
- Gorter, Arnold Marc (Almelo 1866 – Amsterdam 1933)
- Gregoor, Jan (The Hague 1914 – Veldhoven 1982)
- Graafland, Rob (Maastricht 1875 – Heerlen 1940)
- Gubbels, Klaas (Rotterdam 1934)
- Haaren, Dirk van (Amsterdam 1878 – Amsterdam 1953)

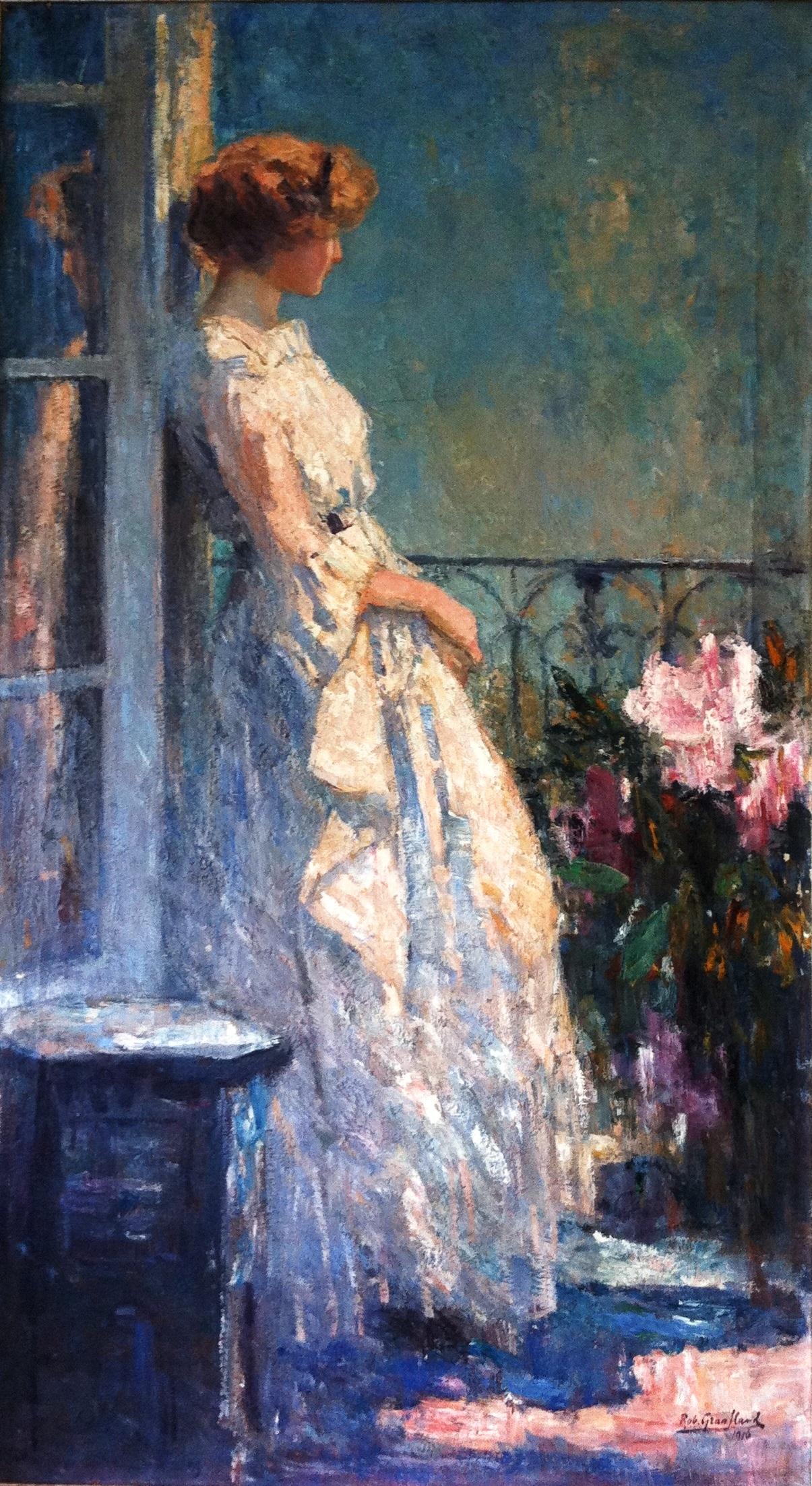
Rob Graafland, 1916

- Haaxman, Pieter (The Hague 1854 – Haarlem 1937)
- Hartwig, Peter (Hoogezand 1963)
- Heemskerck, Jacoba van (The Hague 1876 – Domburg 1923)
- Heerdink, Maurice (The Hague, 1955)
- Heijenbrock, Herman (Amsterdam 1871 – Blaricum 1948)
- Heijnes, Marinus (Amsterdam 1888 – Kaag 1963)
- Hellendoorn, Eduard ( Amsterdam 1912 – Waalsdorpervlakte 1941)
- Herwijnen, Jan van (Delft 1889 – Bergen 1965)
- Heyboer, Anton (Sabang, Sumatra 1924 – Den Ilp 2005)
- Heusden, Wout van (Rotterdam 1896 – Rotterdam 1982)
- Hofhuizen, Willem (Amsterdam 1915 – Maastricht 1986)
- Hoog, Bernard de (Amsterdam 1867 – The Hague 1943)
- Houten, Barbara Elisabeth van (Groningen 1863 – The Hague 1950)
- Houten, Gerrit van (Groningen 1866 – Santpoort 1934)
- Hoynck van Papendrecht, Jan (Amsterdam 1858 – The Hague 1933)
- Huszar, Vilmos (Budapest 1884 – Harderwijk 1960)
- Israëls, Isaac (Amsterdam 1865 – The Hague 1934)
- Jong, Jacqueline (Hengelo 1939)
- Jongh, Tinus de (Amsterdam 1885 – Bloemfontein 1942)
- Jungmann, Nico (Amsterdam 1872 – London 1935)
- Kamerlingh Onnes, Harm (Zoeterwoude 1893 – Leiden 1985)
- Karsen, Eduard (Amsterdam 1860 – Amsterdam 1941)
- Kat, Otto B. de (Dordrecht 1907 – Laren 1995)
- Ket, Dick (Den Helder 1902 – Bennekom 1940)
- Klein, Fred (Bandung 1898 – Paris 1990)
- Kloosterboer, Lorena (Alkmaar 1962)
- Koch, Pyke (Beek 1901 – Amsterdam 1991)
- Koekkoek, Marinus Adrianus (II) (Amsterdam 1873 – Amsterdam 1944)
- Koekkoek, Hermanus Willem (Amsterdam 1867 – Amsterdam 1929)
- Koekkoek, Stephen Robert (London 1887 – Santiago 1934)
- Kooi, Jan van der (Groningen 1957)
- Kooning, Willem de (Rotterdam 1904 – East Hampton 1997)
- Koppelaar, Frans (The Hague 1943)
- Kort, Kees de (Nijkerk 1934)
- Kouwen, Philip (Rotterdam 1922 – Warnsveld 2002)
- Krabbé, Hendrik Maarten (London 1868 – Amsterdam 1931)
- Kruyder, Herman (Lage Vuursche 1881 – Amsterdam 1935)
- Labeij, Willem (Rotterdam 1943 – Dokkum 2011)
- Laguna, Baruch Lopes Leão de (Amsterdam 1864 – Auschwitz 1943)
- Leck, Bart van der (Utrecht 1876 – Blaricum 1958)
- Lo-A-Njoe, Guillaume (Amsterdam 1937)
- Lucebert (Amsterdam 1924 – Alkmaar 1994)
- Luns, Huib (Paris 1881 – Amsterdam 1942)
- Lussenburg, Jos (Enkhuizen 1898 – Nunspeet 1975)

=== M-S ===
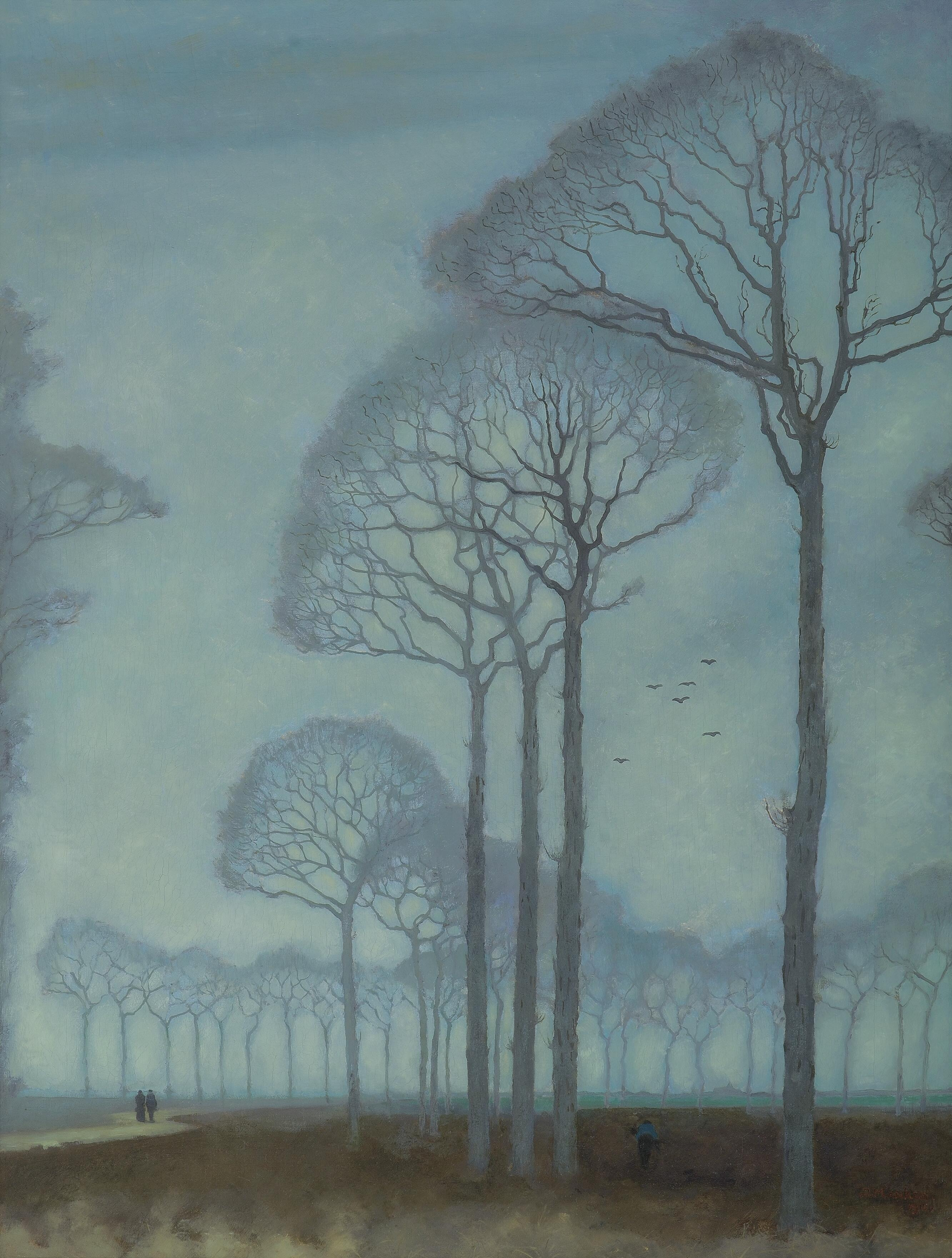
Jan Mankes, 1915

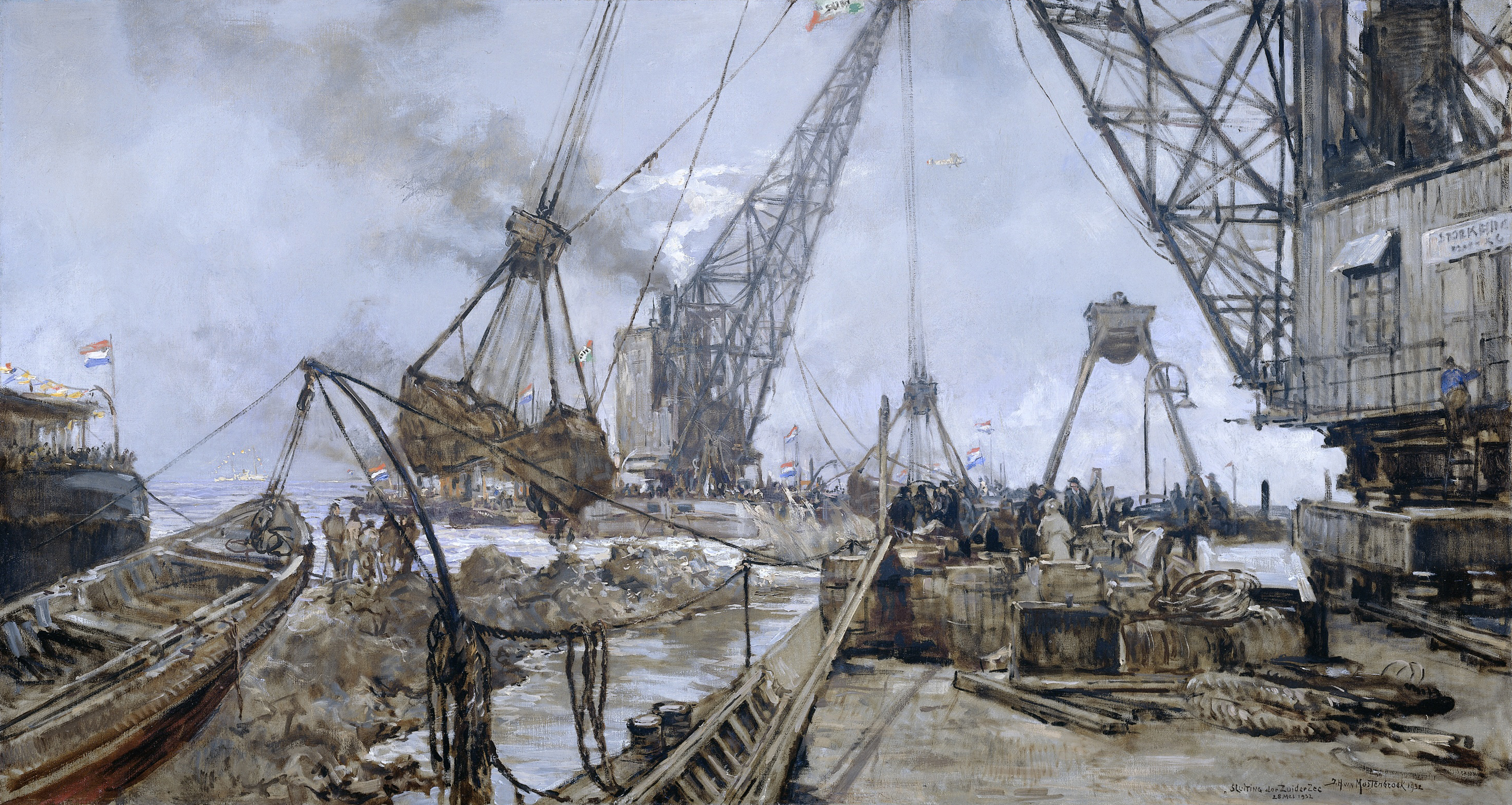
Johan H. van Mastenbroek, 1932

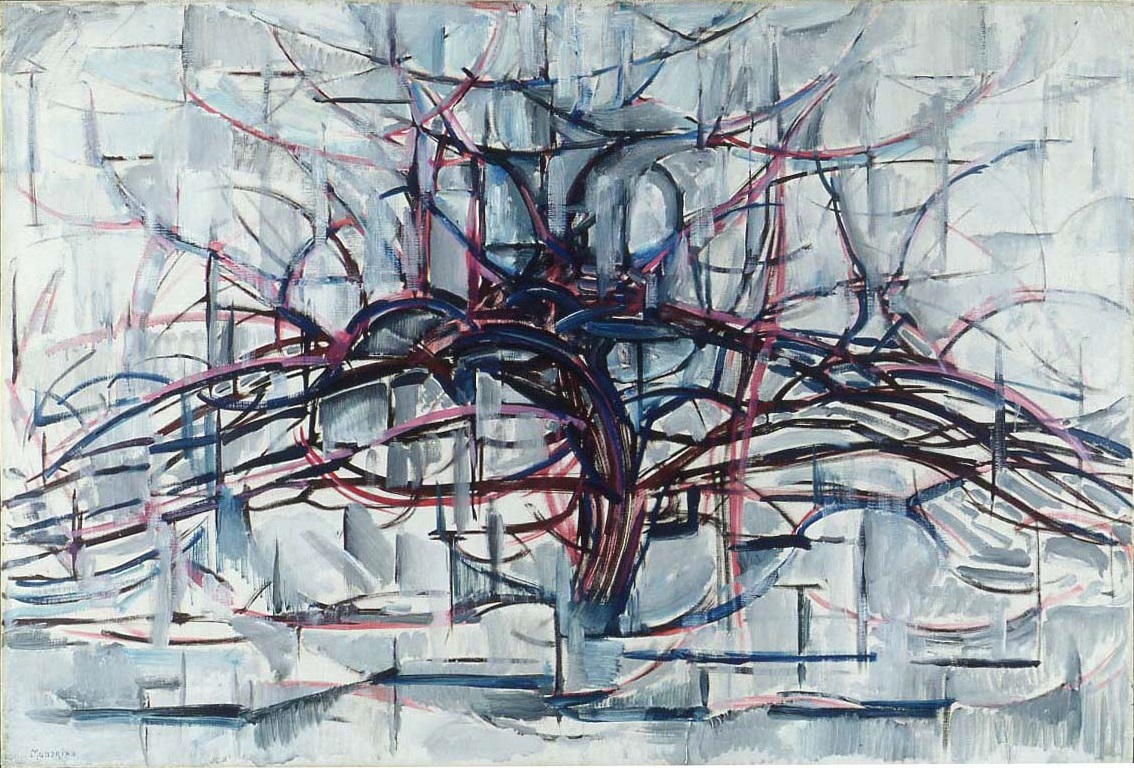
Piet Mondriaan, 1911

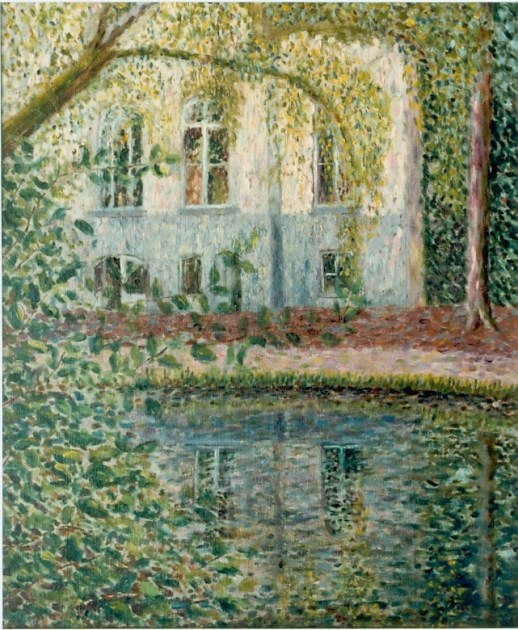
Maurits Niekerk, c. 1900

- Maas, Tjaarke (Lopik 1974 – Assisi 2004)
- Mackenzie, Marie Henry (Rotterdam 1878 – Hilversum 1961)
- Maks, Kees (Amsterdam 1876 – Amsterdam 1967)
- Mankes, Jan (Meppel 1889 – Eerbeek 1920)
- Meegeren, Han van (Deventer 1889 – Amsterdam 1947)
- Mees, Herman (Veendam 1880 – Zuidlaren 1964)
- Melchers, Cor (Huissen 1954 – Huissen 2015)
- Meijer, Sal (Amsterdam 1877 – Blaricum 1965)
- Molkenboer, Theo (Leeuwarden 1871 – Lugano 1920)
- Mondriaan, Piet (Amersfoort 1872 – New York 1944)
- Moulijn, Simon (Rotterdam 1866 – The Hague 1948)
- Muller, Gerard (Amsterdam 1861 – Amsterdam 1929)
- Nerée tot Babberich, Karel de (Zevenaar 1880 – Todtmoos 1909)
- Niekerk, Maurits (Amsterdam 1871 – Paris 1940)
- Nieuwenkamp, W. O. J. (Amsterdam 1874 – Fiesole 1950)
- Nieuwenhuys, Constant (Amsterdam 1920 – Utrecht 2005)
- Nieuwenhuys, Jan (Amsterdam 1922 – Amsterdam 1986)
- Noppen, Daan (Arnhem, 1977)
- Numans, Henriëtte Gesina (Sintang, Borneo 1877 – Zeist 1955)
- Oomens, Wilhelm Josef, (The Hague 1918 – Nijmegen 2008)
- Ouborg, Piet (Dordrecht 1893 – The Hague 1956)
- Coen van Oven (Dordrecht 1883 – Amsterdam 1963)
- Paalman, Fra (Hengelo 1945 – Hengelo 2020)
- Pieck, Anton (Den Helder 1895 – Overveen 1987)
- Pinkhof, Leonard (Amsterdam 1898 – Sobibor extermination camp 1943)
- Poortvliet, Rien (Schiedam 1932 – Soest 1995)
- Postma, Gerriet (Twijzelerheide 1932 – Groningen 2009)
- Pott, Alida Jantina (Groningen 1888 – Groningen 1931)
- Raedecker, Michael (Amsterdam 1963)
- Rees, Otto van (Freiburg 1884 – Utrecht 1957)
- Rijkhart de Voogd, Thierry (Grand-Couronne 1944 – Zutphen 1999)
- Ritsema, Coba (Haarlem 1876 – Amsterdam 1961)
- Roëde, Jan (Groningen 1914 – The Hague 2007)
- Röling, Matthijs (Oostkapelle 1943)
- Schrofer, Willem (Scheveningen 1898 – Leiden 1968)
- Schuhmacher, Wim (Amsterdam 1894 – Amsterdam 1986)
- Schulten, Ton (Ootmarsum 1938)
- Sierhuis, Jan (Amsterdam 1928)
- Sjardijn, Martin (Den Haag 1947)
- Sluijters, Jan ('s-Hertogenbosch 1881 – Amsterdam 1957)
- Sluiter, Willy (Amersfoort 1873 – The Hague 1949)
- Sparnaay, Tjalf (Hilversum 1954)
- Smit, Arie (Zaandam 1916 – Denpasar 2016)
- Smorenberg, Dirk (Alkmaar 1883 – Oud-Loosdrecht 1960)
- Stapel, Dick (The Hague 1942)
- Sterkenburg, Peter (Harlingen 1955 – Zurich 2000)
- Stoop, Pieter (Breda 1946)
- Stuivenberg, Piet van (Schiedam 1901 – Schiedam 1988)
- Surie, Jacoba (Amsterdam 1879 – Amsterdam 1970)

=== T-Z ===
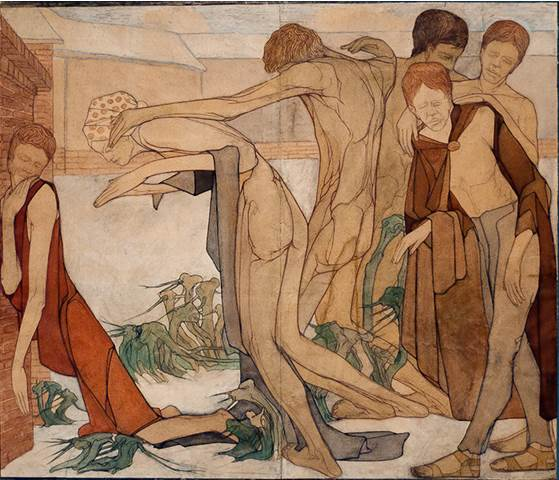
Jan Thorn-Prikker, 1907

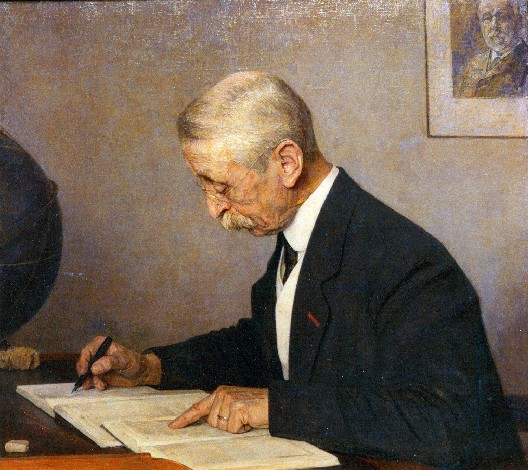
Jan Veth, 1918

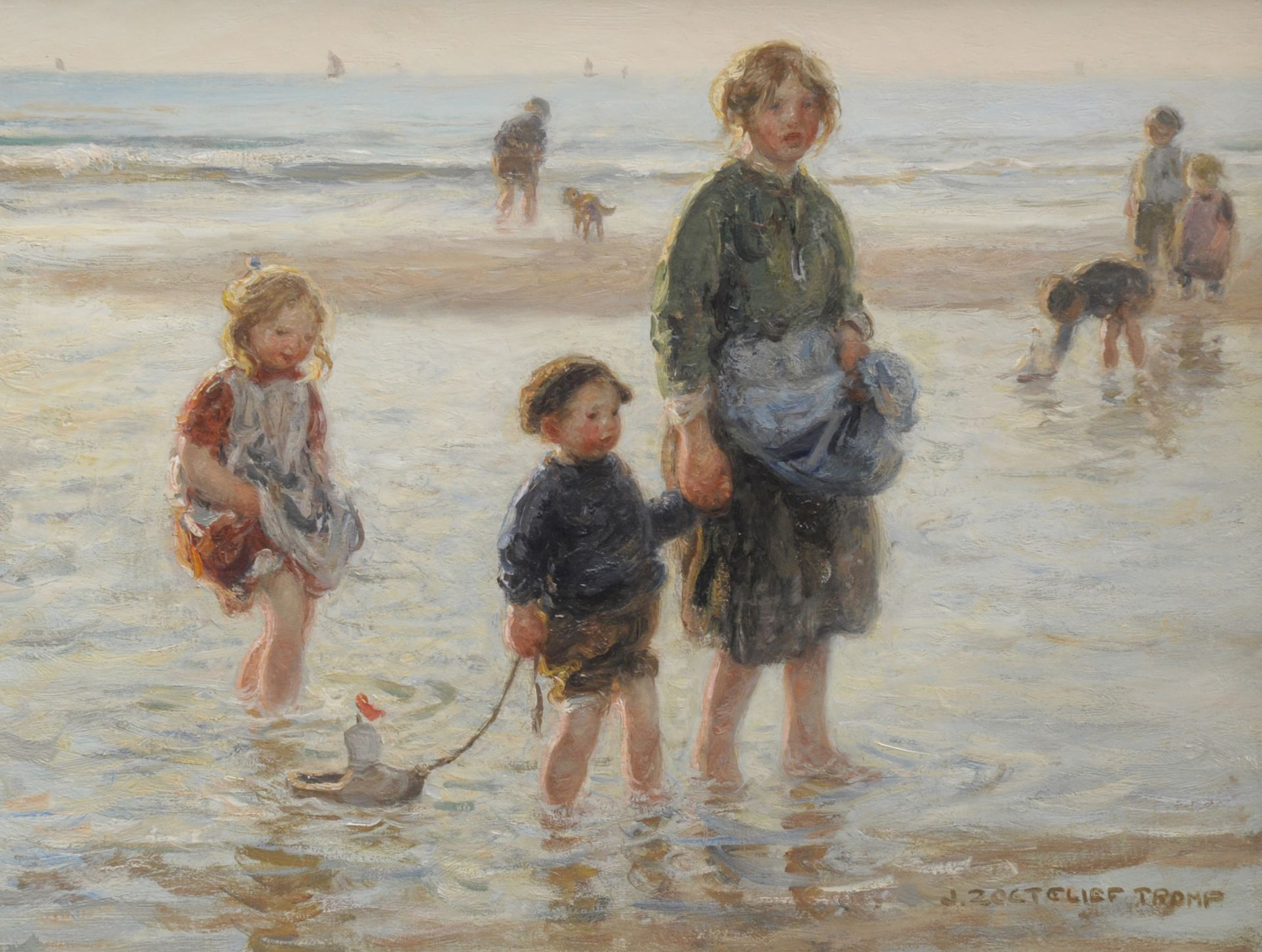
Jan Zoetelief Tromp, c. 1910

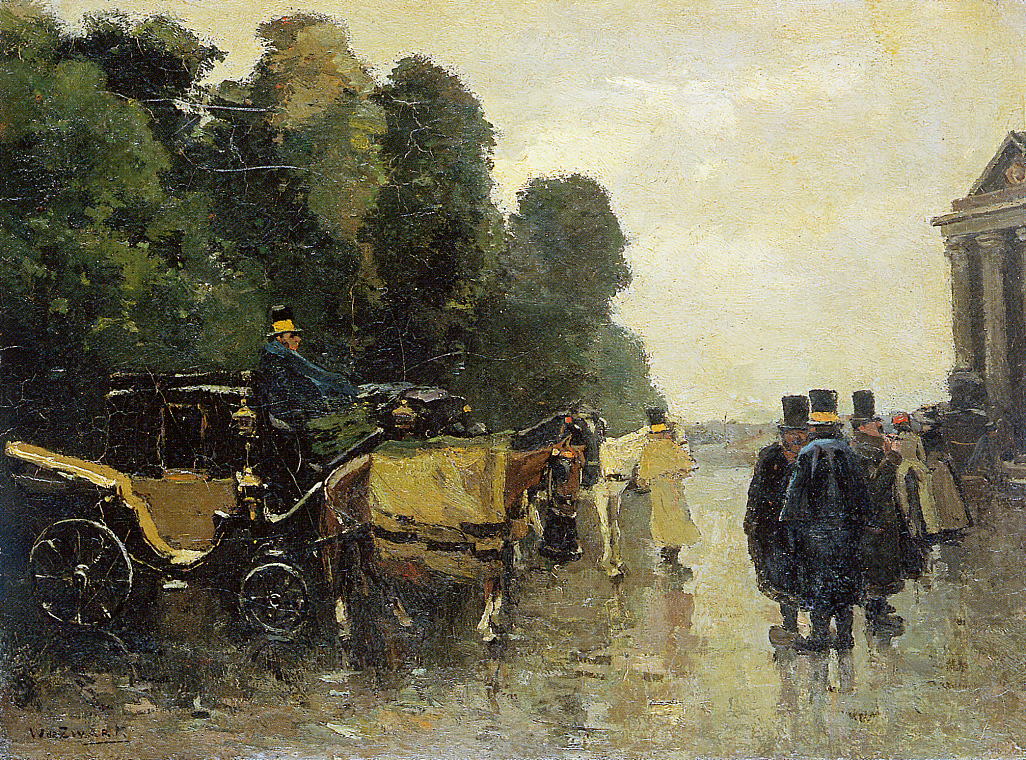
Willem de Zwart

- Tangelder, Linde Freya (Doetinchem 1987)
- Teixeira de Mattos, Joseph (Amsterdam 1892 – Paris 1971)
- Terpstra, Rein Jelle (Leeuwarden 1960)
- Theuns, Jan (Breda 1877 – Breda 1961)
- Thieme, Anthony (Rotterdam 1888 – Greenwich Village 1954)
- Thole, Karel (Bussum 1914 – Cannobio 2000)
- Tholen, Willem Bastiaan (Amsterdam 1860 – The Hague 1931)
- Thomassen, Jean (The Hague 1949)
- Thorn Prikker, Johan (The Hague 1868 – Cologne 1932)
- Kees Timmer (Zaandam 1903 – Rotterdam 1978)
- Toorop, Charley (Katwijk 1891 – Bergen 1955)
- Vanderheyden, JCJ (Den Bosch 1928 – Den Bosch 2012)
- Veen, Julie van der Veen (Kudus, Java 1903 – Scheveningen 1997)
- Velde, Bram van (Zoeterwoude 1895 – Grimaud 1981)
- Velde, Geer van (Lisse 1898 – Cachan 1977)
- Veldhuizen, Willem van (Rotterdam 1954)
- Veltman, Thierry (Bussum 1939 – Dordrecht? 2023)
- Verkade, Jan (Zaandam 1868 – Beuron 1946)
- Verster, Floris (Leiden 1861 – Leiden 1927)
- Verwey, Kees (Amsterdam 1900 – Haarlem 1995)
- Veth, Jan (Dordrecht 1864 – Amsterdam 1925)
- Visser, Cor (Spaarndam 1903 – Ipswich 1982)
- Voorden, August Willem van (Rotterdam 1881 – Rotterdam 1921)
- Voskuil, Jo (Breda 1897 – Amsterdam 1972)
- Waay, Nicolaas van der (Amsterdam 1855 – Amsterdam 1936)
- Westerik, Co (The Hague 1924 – Rotterdam 2018)
- Westermann, Gerhard (Leeuwarden 1880 – Amsterdam 1971)
- Wiegers, Jan (Kommerzijl 1893 – Amsterdam 1959)
- Wiegman, Piet (Zwolle 1885 – Alkmaar 1963)
- Wijngaarden, Theo van (Rotterdam 1874 – Voorburg 1952)
- Wijsmuller, Jan Hillebrand (Amsterdam 1855 – Amsterdam 1925)
- Willink, Carel (Amsterdam 1900 – Amsterdam 1983)
- Woerden, Henk van (Leiden 1947 – Ann Arbor 2005)
- Wortel, Ans (Alkmaar 1929 – Hilvarenbeek 1996)
- Zandleven, Jan Adam (Koog aan de Zaan 1868 – Rhenen 1923)
- Zon, Jacques (The Hague 1872 – The Hague 1932)
- Zwart, Willem de (The Hague 1862 – The Hague 1931)

== See also ==
- List of Dutch sculptors
- List of Dutch artists

== Sources ==
- Netherlands Institute for Art History
- artcyclopedia
- Grove Dictionary of Art
