= Barbiers =

Barbiers is the surname of a large family of artists. Notable people with the surname include:

- Pieter Barbiers (I), (1717–1780) Dutch artist, father of Pieter Pietersz (II) and Bartholomeus (I)
  - Pieter Pietersz Barbiers (II) (1749–1842), Dutch artist, son of Pieter (I)
    - Bartholomeus Barbiers II, (1784–1816) Dutch painter, son of Pieter Pietersz (II)
  - Bartholomeus Barbiers (I), (1743–1808) Dutch painter, son of Pieter (I)
    - Pieter Bartholomeusz Barbiers (III), (1771–1837) Dutch artist, son of Bartholomeus (I)
    - Maria Geertruida Barbiers-Snabilie (1776 – 1838) Dutch artist, wife of Pieter (III)
      - Pieter Barbiers IV, (1798–1848) Dutch artist, son of Pieter Bzsn (III) and Maria Geertruida Snabilié
      - Maria Geertruida Barbiers (1801–1849) Dutch artist, daughter of Pieter Bzsn (III) and Maria Geertruida Snabilié; sister of the former, who married the painter Pieter de Goeje (1789–1859)
