= Pieter Barbiers =

Pieter Barbiers may refer to:

- Pieter Barbiers (painter) (1717–1780), Dutch scenery artist
- Pieter Bartholomeusz Barbiers (1771–1837), Dutch painter
- Pieter Pietersz Barbiers (1749–1842), Dutch painter
