= Lambertus Johannes Hansen =

19th C. Dutch painter

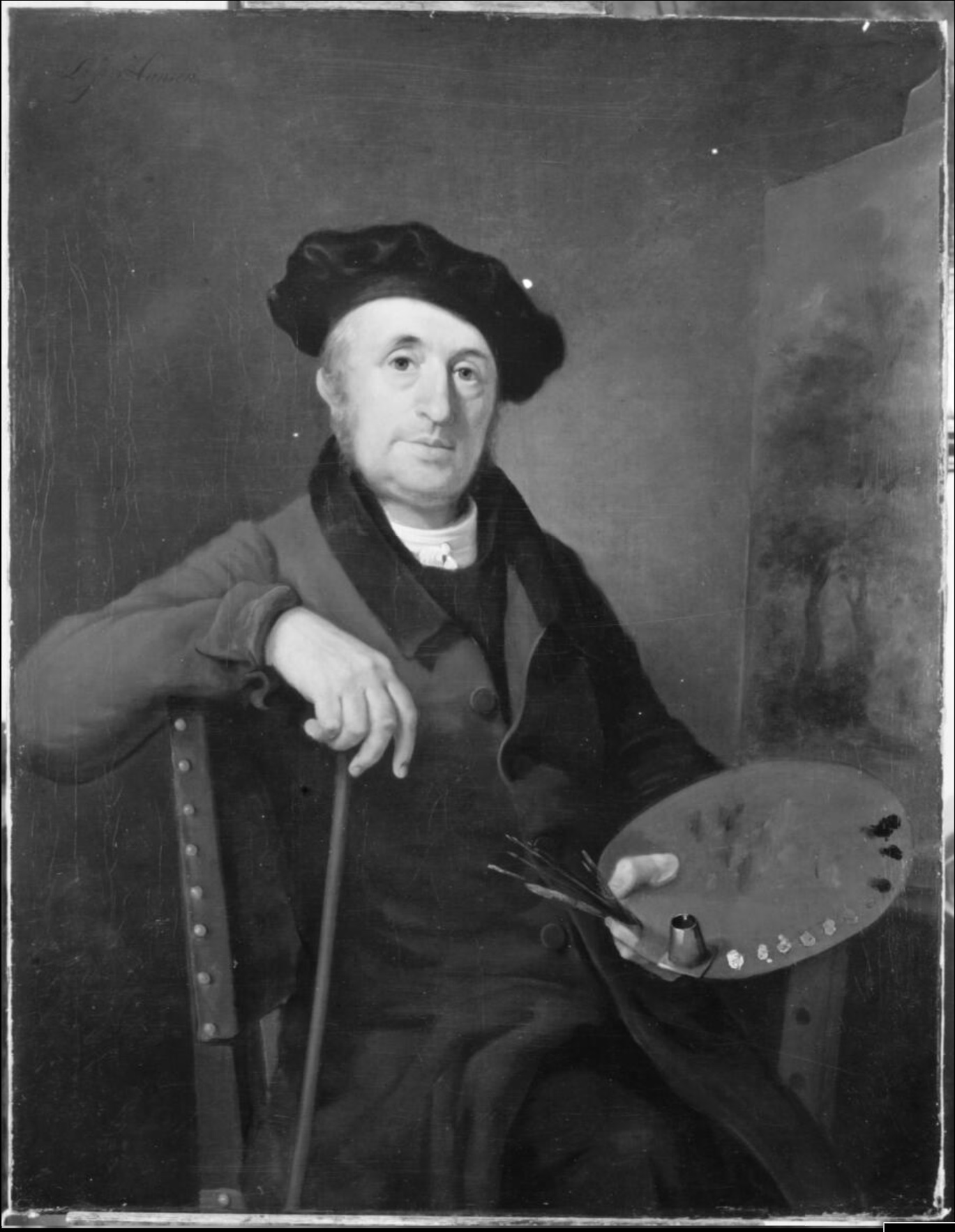
- Self-portrait
- Born: 12 August 1803; Staphorst, Netherlands
- Died: 21 April 1859 (aged 55); Amsterdam, Netherlands
- Known for: Painter
- Movement: Genre Painting

Lambertus Johannes Hansen (12 August 1803, Staphorst – 21 April 1859, Amsterdam) was a 19th-century Dutch painter.

== Biography ==
According to the RKD he was the son of the cityscape painter Carel Lodewijk Hansen and the brother of Carel II (born 1793).

He was a pupil of his father, Jean Augustin Daiwaille, Charles Howard Hodges, Jan Hulswit, Pieter Barbiers IV and Jan Willem Pieneman. His main subject was the painting of inner houses, with doorways and incident lights. He is known for historical interiors in the manner of Pieter de Hooch.

Both at the Royal Academy of Art in Amsterdam, as well as at the Society Felix Meritis, he won several prizes. In 1832 he won a silver medal for his painting after a nude model in the category nudes. In 1833 he became a fellow member of the Amsterdam Academy and also a teacher at that institution. He later taught Hendrik Jacobus Scholten when he became a teacher there.

He was married in 1834 to Cornelia Helena Anna Christiani, whom he lost after giving him three sons (died 1842), the oldest of whom was six years old. Lambertus married a second time on 5 April 1847 to Geertruij Meeltj Stijnis. After his death on 6 September 1859, his legacy was sold at Amsterdam, there were paintings from the 17th and 18th centuries and from his own time, drawings by himself and by former masters, prints, further castes, furniture and clothing, silverware and porcelain.

== Family portraits ==
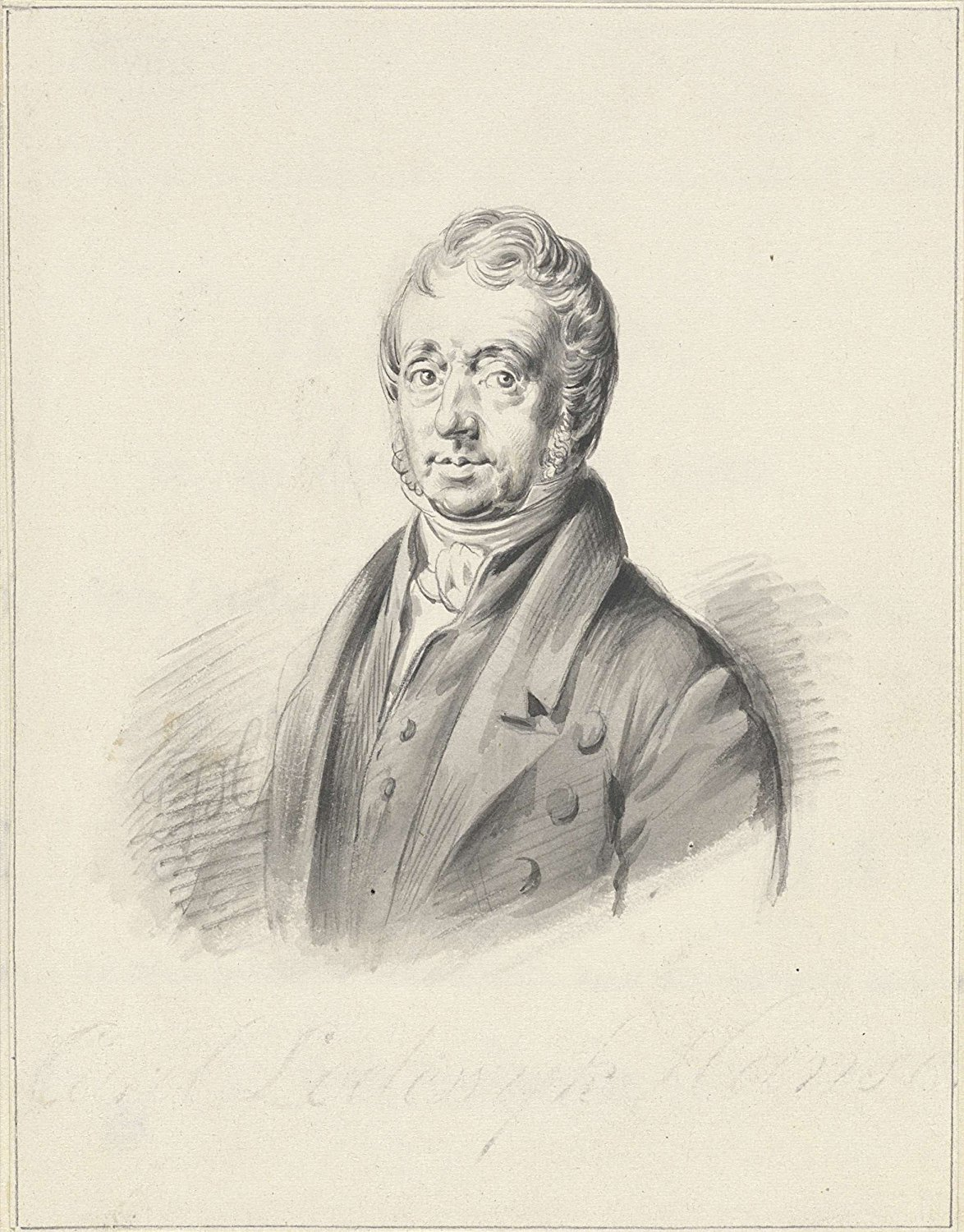
Carel Lodewijk Hansen, Lambertus father

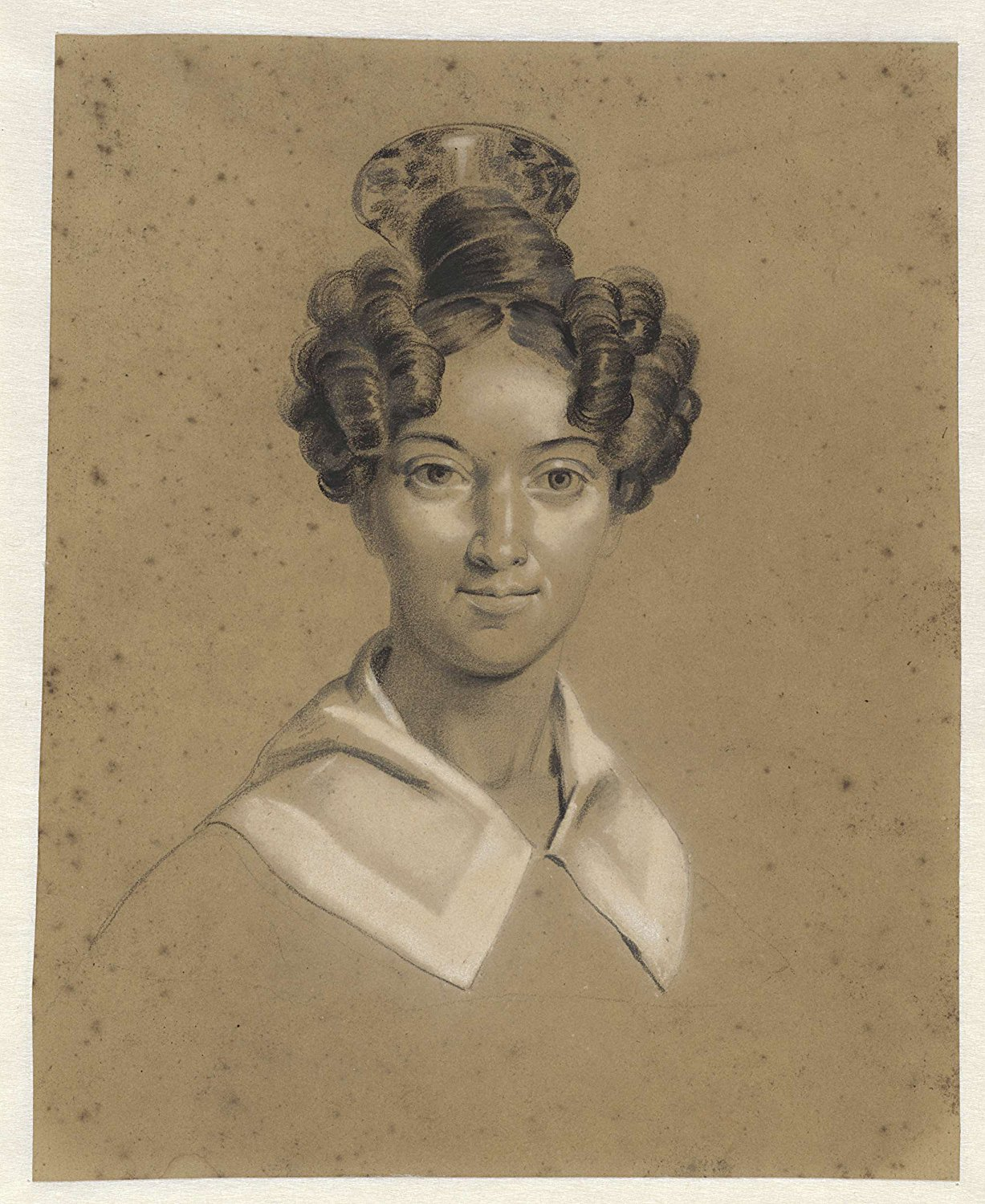
Cornelia Helena Anna Christiani, Lambertus' wife

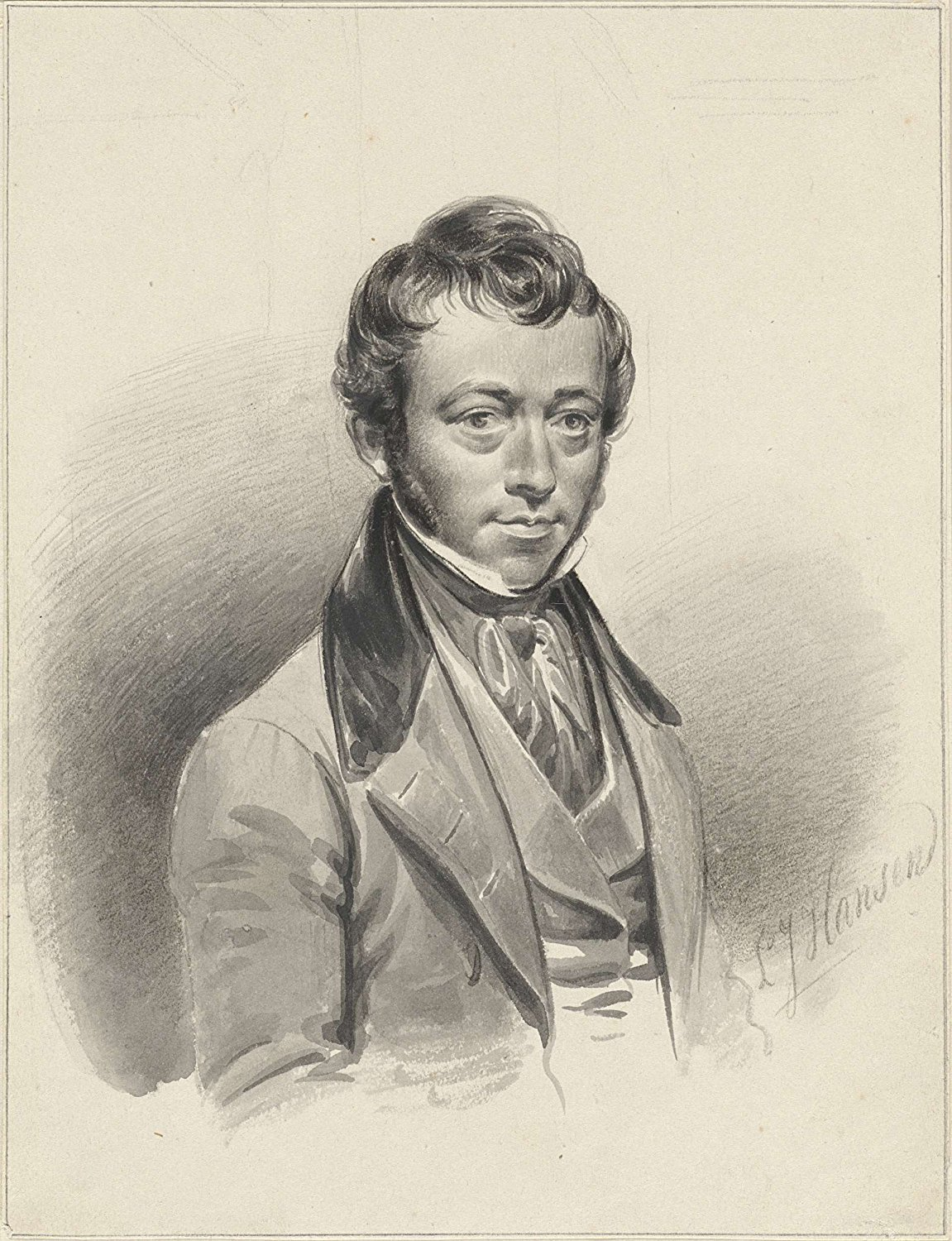
Lambertus Hansen self-portrait

== Gallery ==
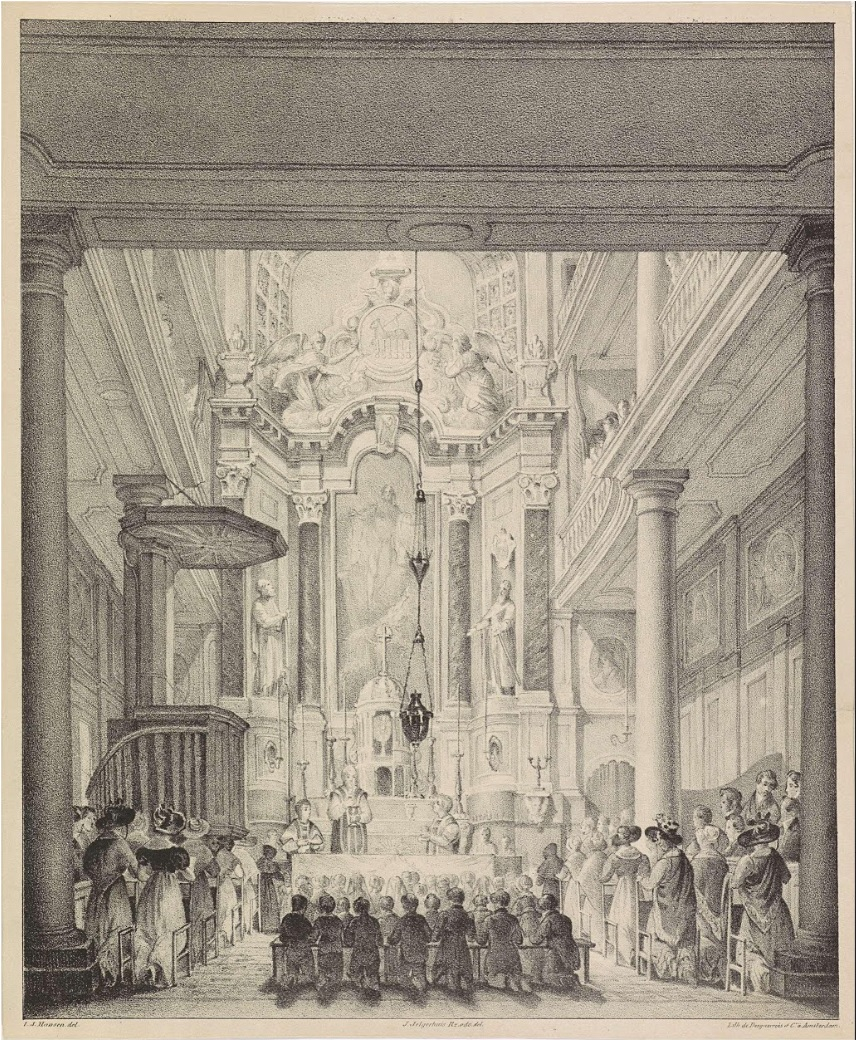
First holy communion in the Roman Catholic French church on the Boommarkt in Amsterdam, c.1830, collection Rijksmuseum

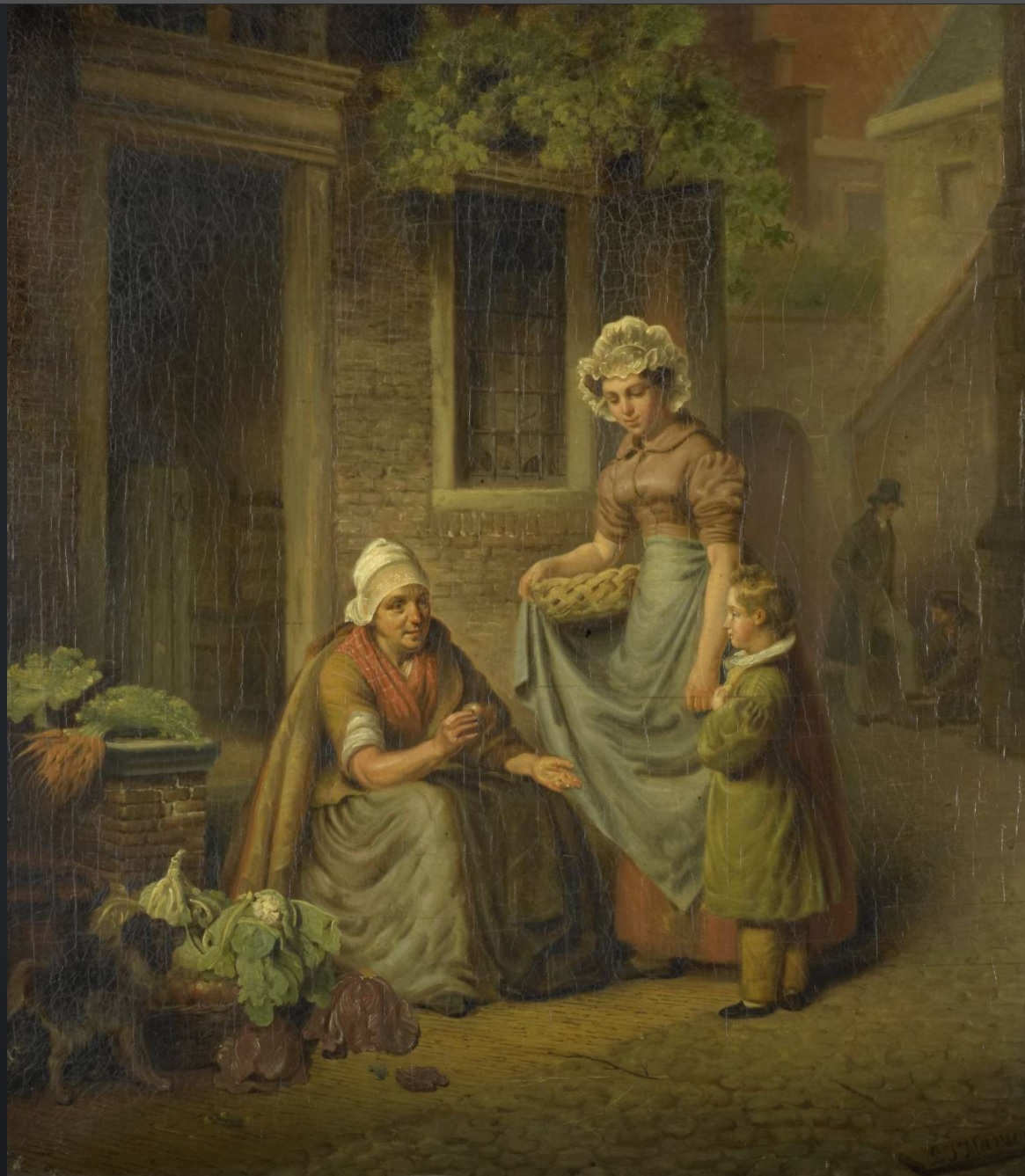
Woman selling vegetables, collection Rijksmuseum

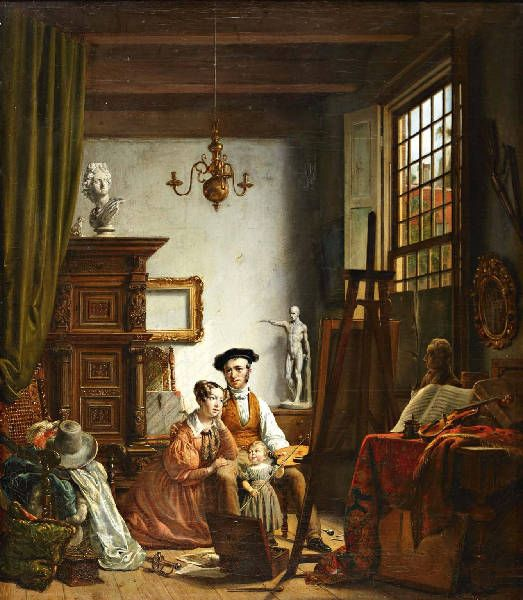
Interior with a man painting

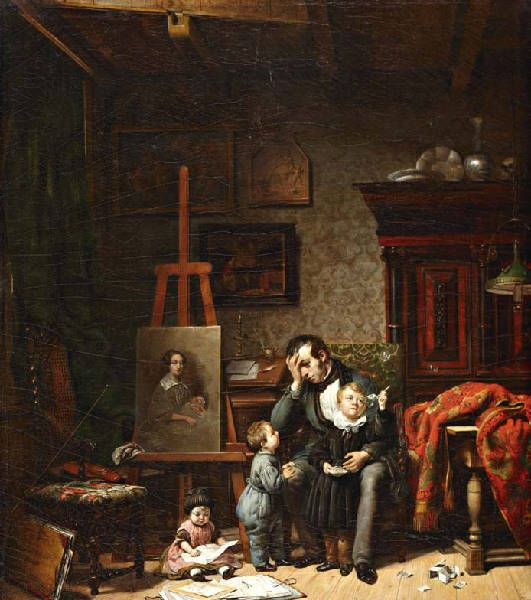
Interior with a man and children near a stand with a painting on an easel

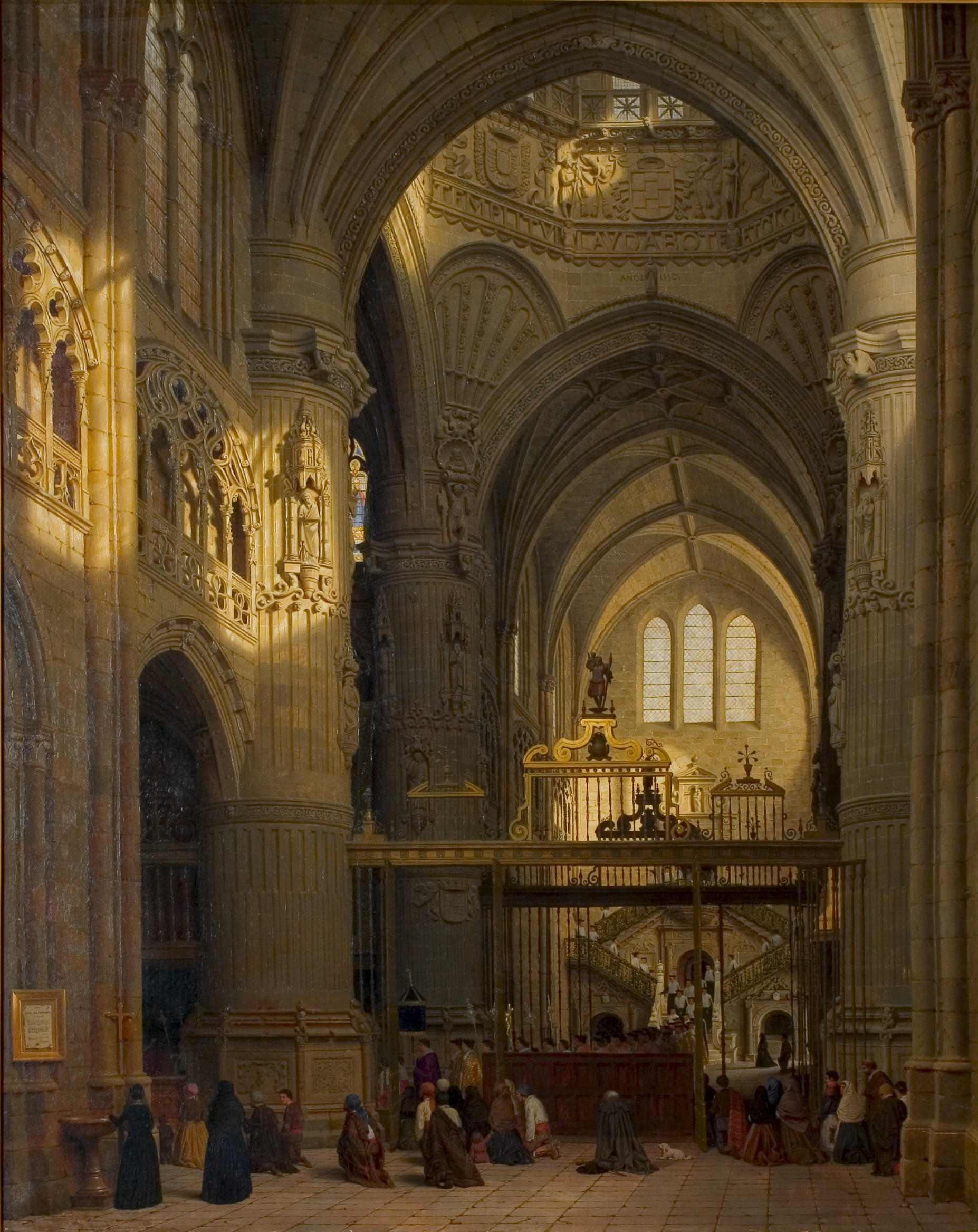
Interior of the cathedral in Burgos, 1851, collection Rijksmuseum Twenthe

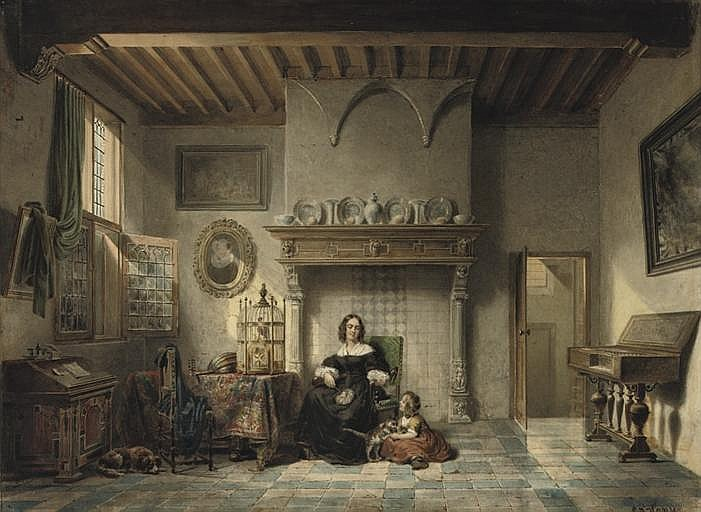
Interior with a woman and a girl

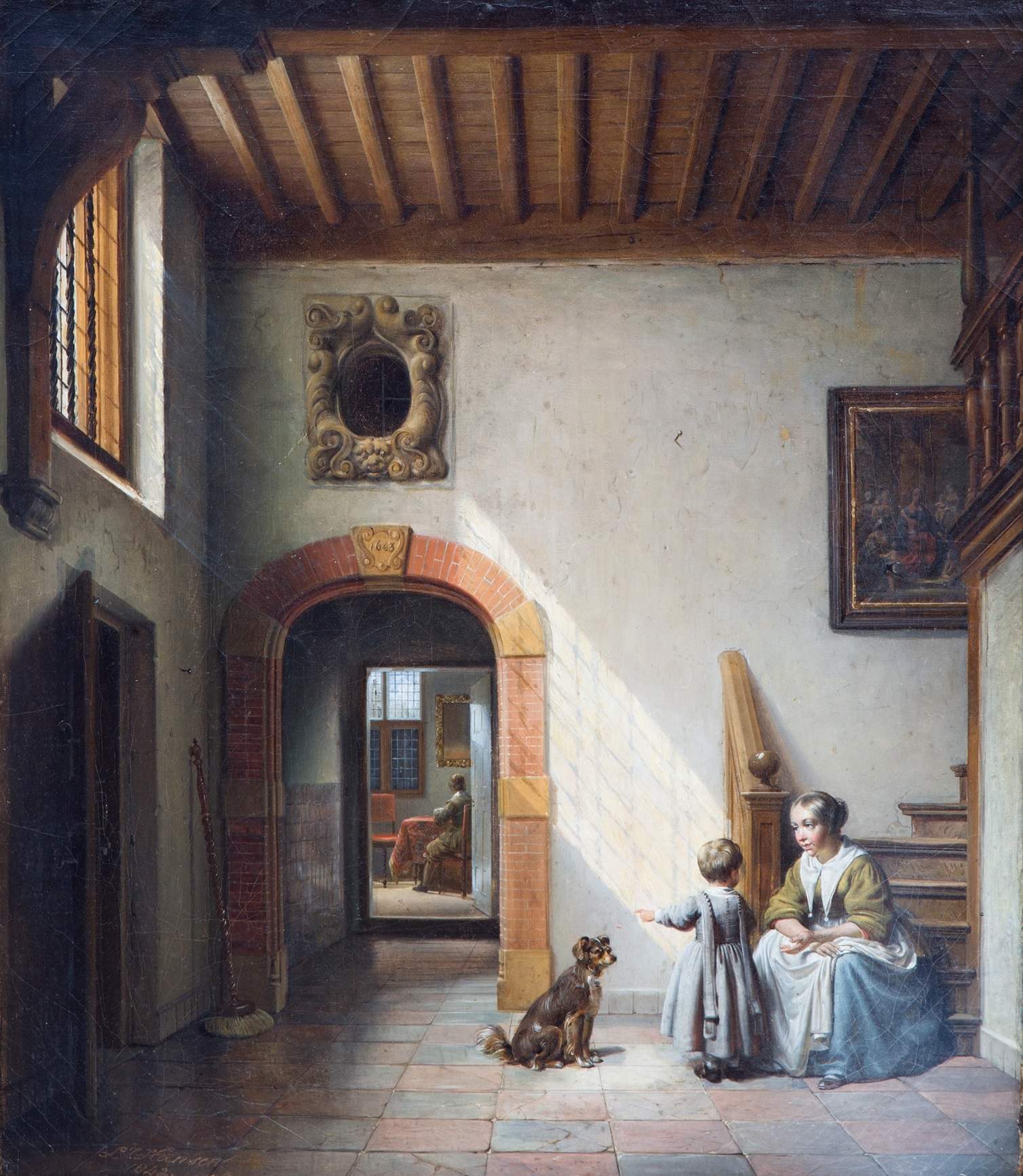
Woman and a child in a hall

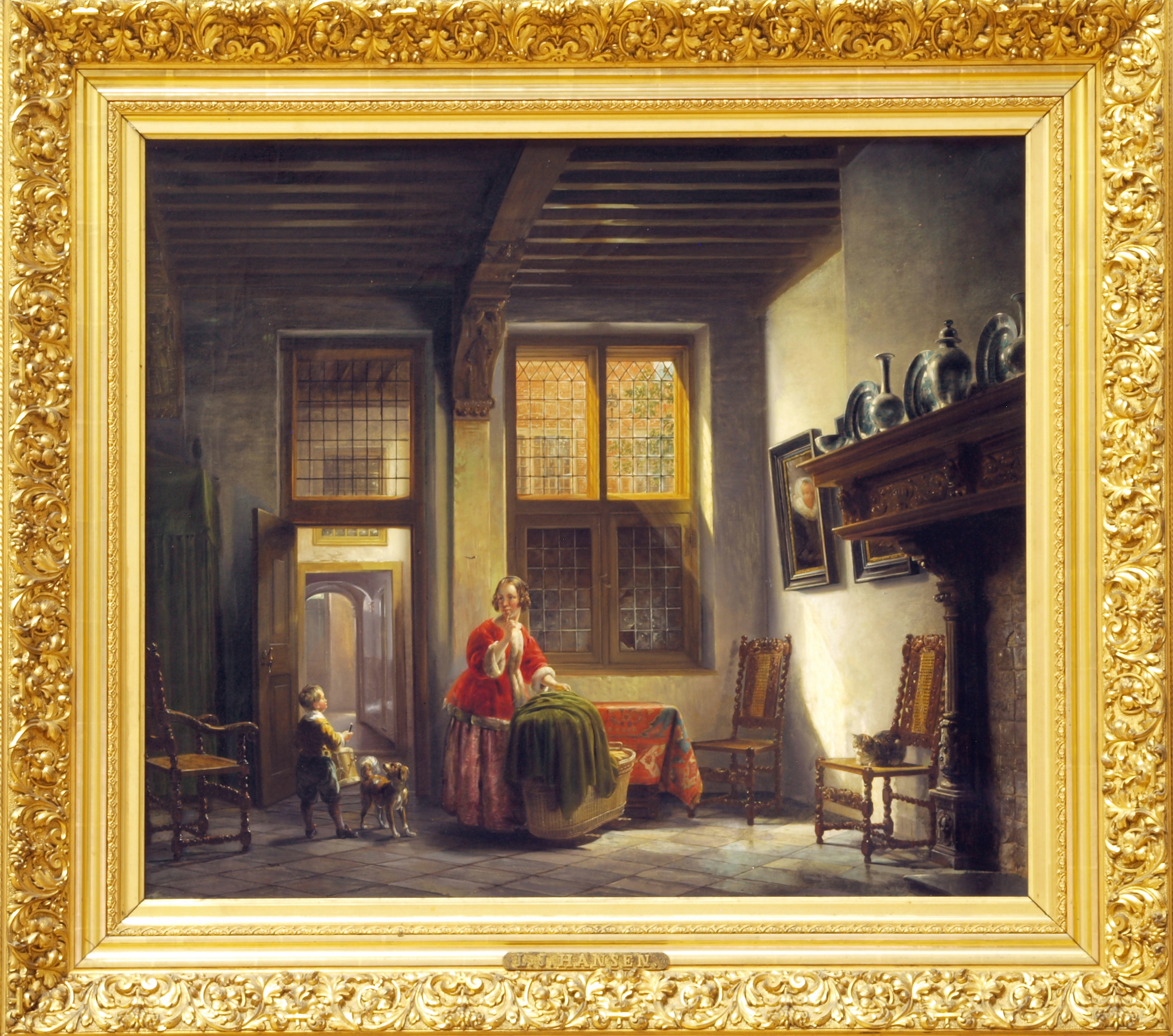
Interior with a woman and child near a stairway, collection Teylers Museum
