= Charles Howard Hodges =

English painter (1764–1837)

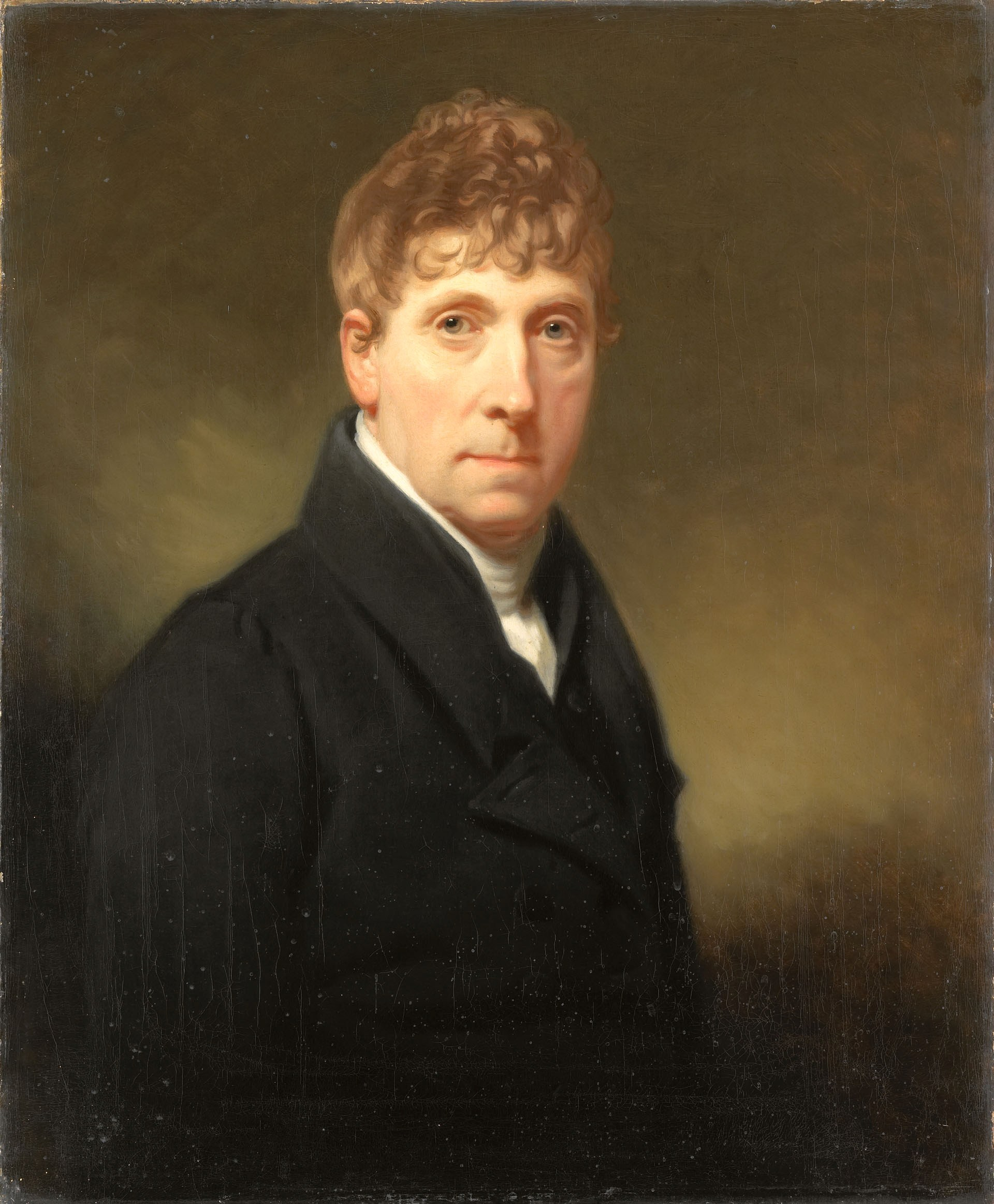
- Self-portrait, 1835
- Born: 1764; Portsmouth, England
- Died: 24 July 1837 (aged 72–73); Amsterdam, Netherlands

Charles Howard Hodges (1764 – 24 July 1837) was an English painter active in the Netherlands during the late 18th and early 19th centuries.

== Biography ==
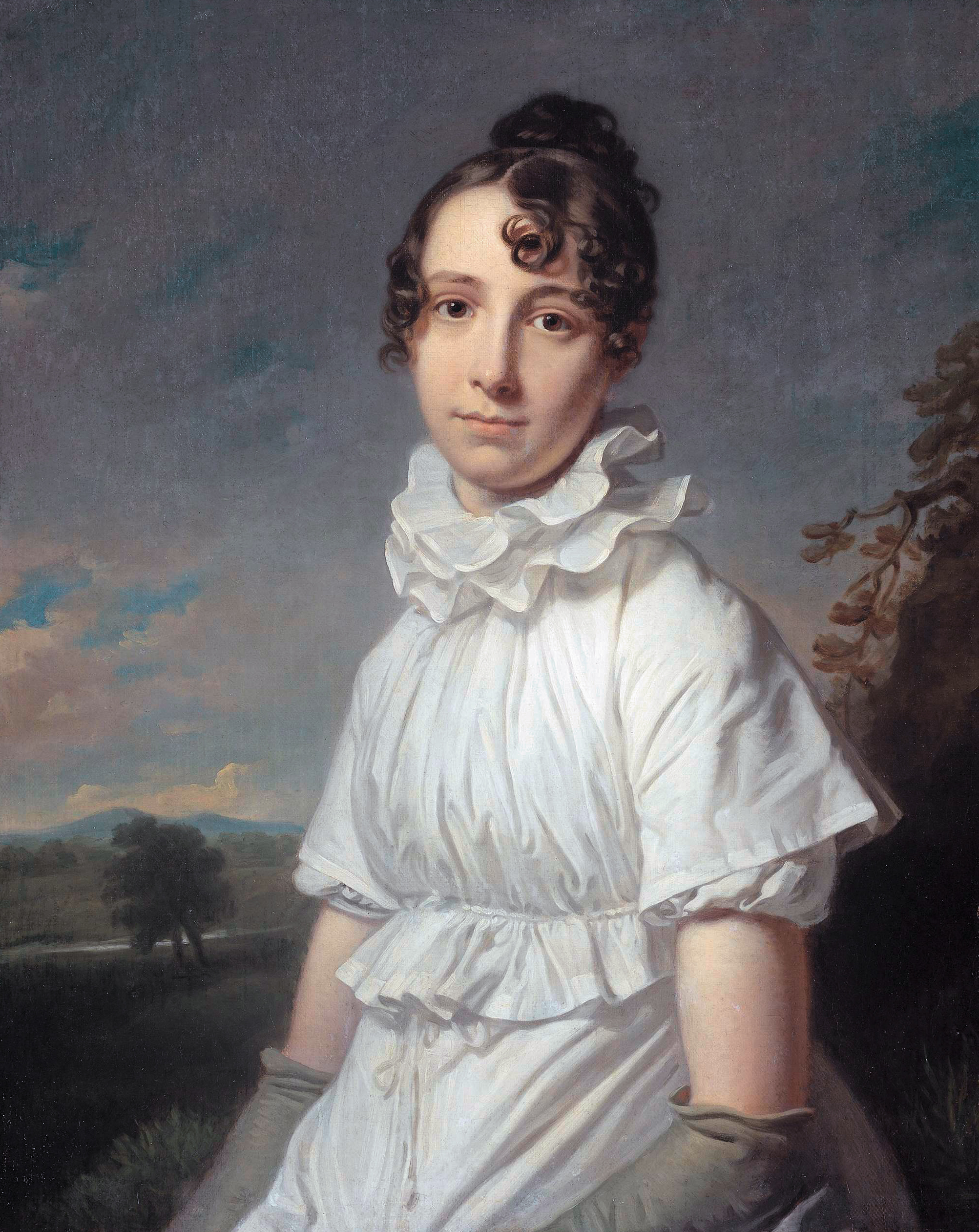
Portrait of his daughter Emma Jane, 1815

Hodges was a pupil of John Raphael Smith and had visited Amsterdam in 1788; after a two-year stay in Dublin, he moved with his family to The Hague in 1792. In 1797, he and his family moved to Amsterdam, where he lived with his teacher Johann Friedrich August Tischbein at the Prinsengracht N° 205. In Amsterdam, he worked as an artist, specialized in the mezzotint technique he had learned in England and the pastel technique he learned from Tischbein. There, he became a famous painter of portraits; he painted over 700 portraits of the rich and famous of that time. He was also an engraver, printer, art dealer and a member of the Amsterdam art club Felix Meritis.

He is well known for the fact that he painted all the leaders of the Netherlands during the Napoleonic Period – a turbulent time in Dutch history, since the Netherlands went through five different political systems: stadtholder Willem V of the Republic of the United Netherlands, Grand Pensionary Rutger Jan Schimmelpenninck of the Batavian Republic, King Louis Bonaparte (King of Holland), Emperor Napoleon Bonaparte and king William I of the Netherlands. The only known portrait of Sebald Justinus Brugmans was made by him. A design for the honorary cross of the Order of the Union was rejected by Louis Bonaparte.

In 1815 Hodges advised the Dutch government on the return of thousands of works of art, which were confiscated by the French in 1795 from several collections, including the Gallery of Prince William V (the first museum open to the public in the Netherlands), and the several collections of the previous stadtholders. Not all the stolen art was returned from Paris, and it is said that several pieces are still held in the Louvre up to this day.

Most of the over 700 portraits by Hodges are made in the early 19th century, the earlier works in pastel, and later work in oil paint. Several of these portraits can be found in the Rijksmuseum in Amsterdam, in museums and castles and in royal and private collections.

Charles Howard Hodges was teacher to his children Emma Jane Hodges and James Newman Hodges. James became a painter who worked in the Rijksmuseum when it was still located in the Trippenhuis in Amsterdam. Charles' pupils besides his children were Frederik Christiaan Bierweiler, William Fleming, Lambertus Johannes Hansen, Cornelis Kruseman, Joachim Jan Oortman, Petrus Antonius Ravelli, and Francesco Tozelli.

== Gallery ==
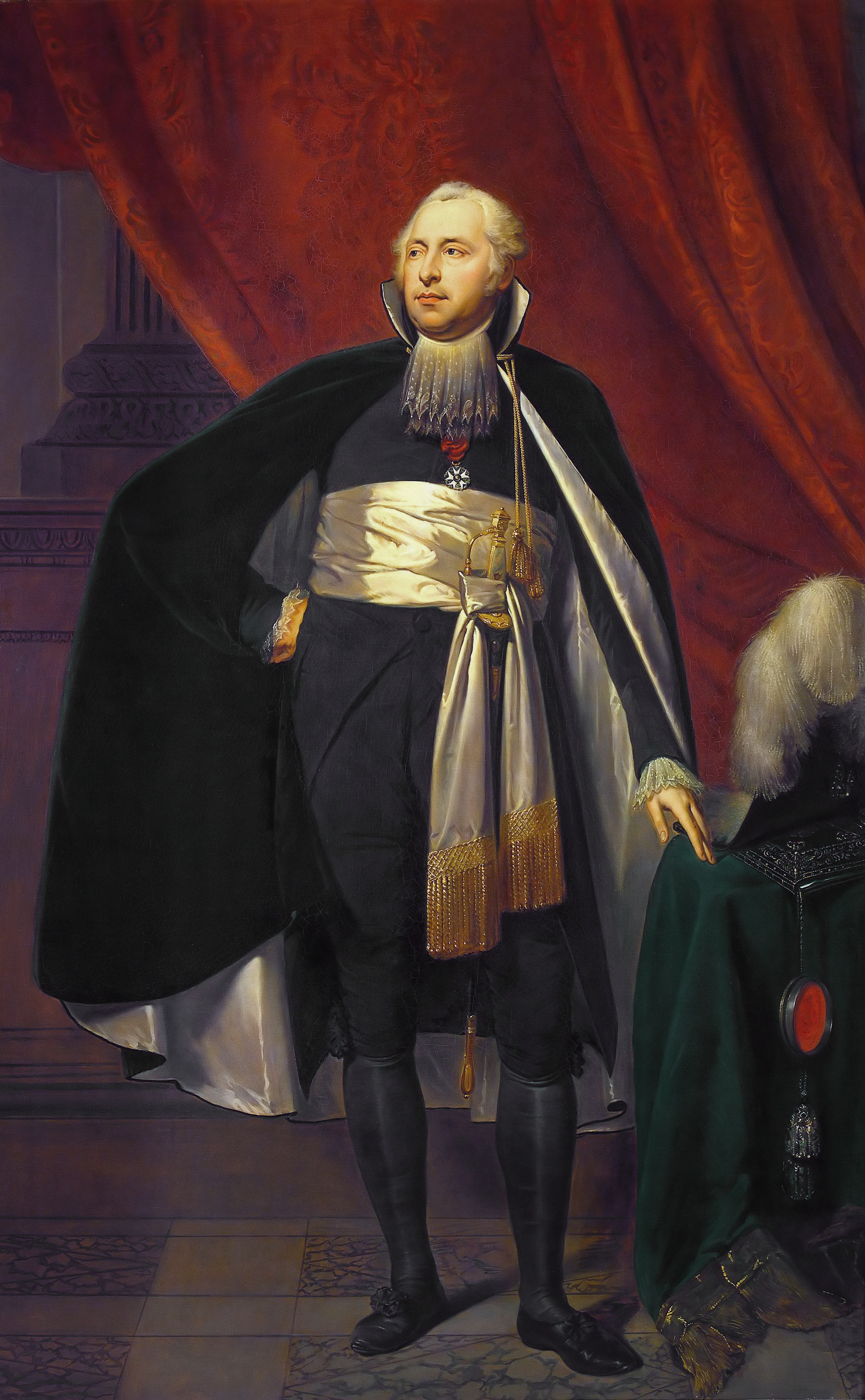
Grand Pensionary Rutger Jan Schimmelpenninck (1806)

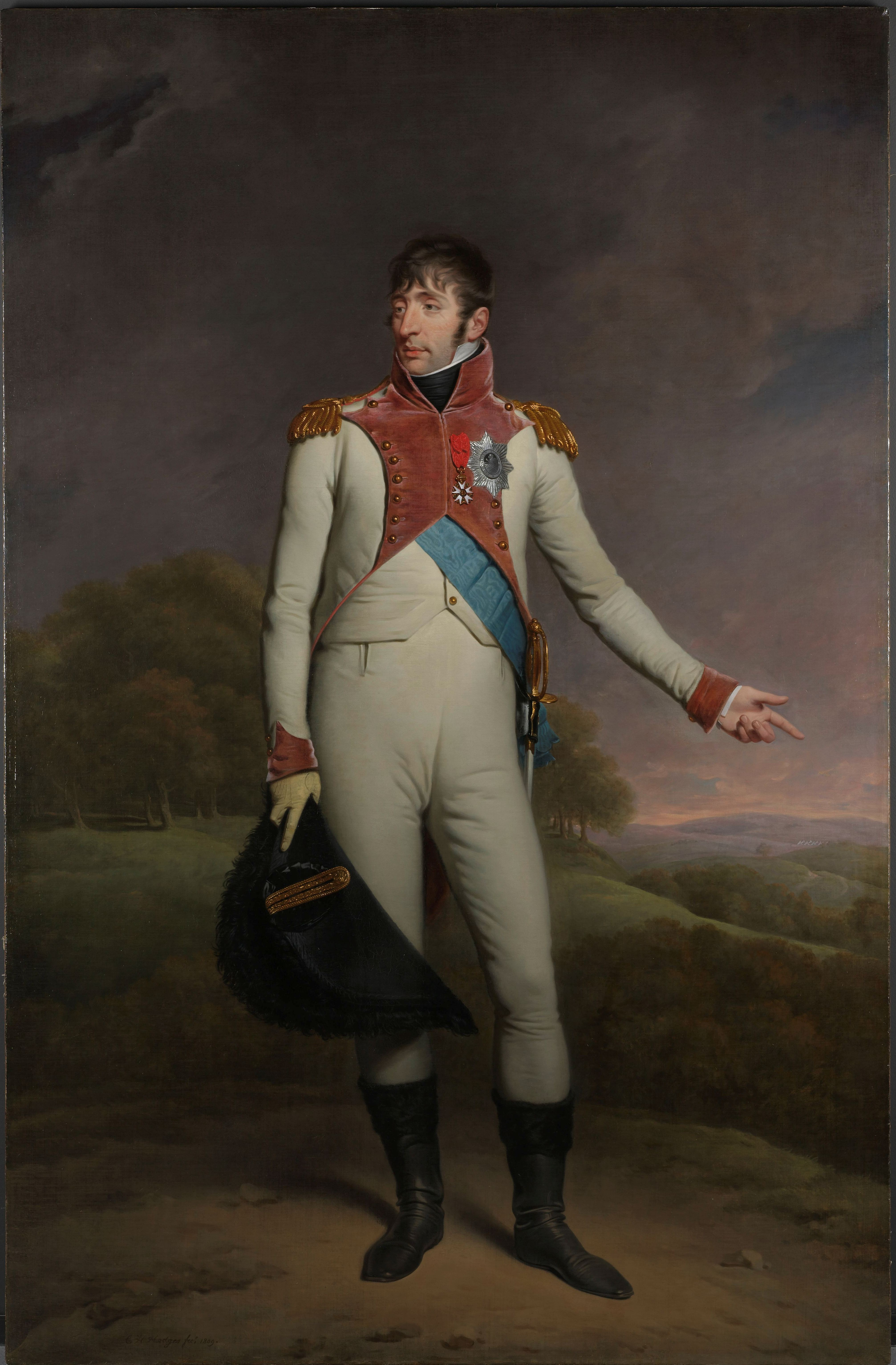
Portrait of Louis Bonaparte (1809)

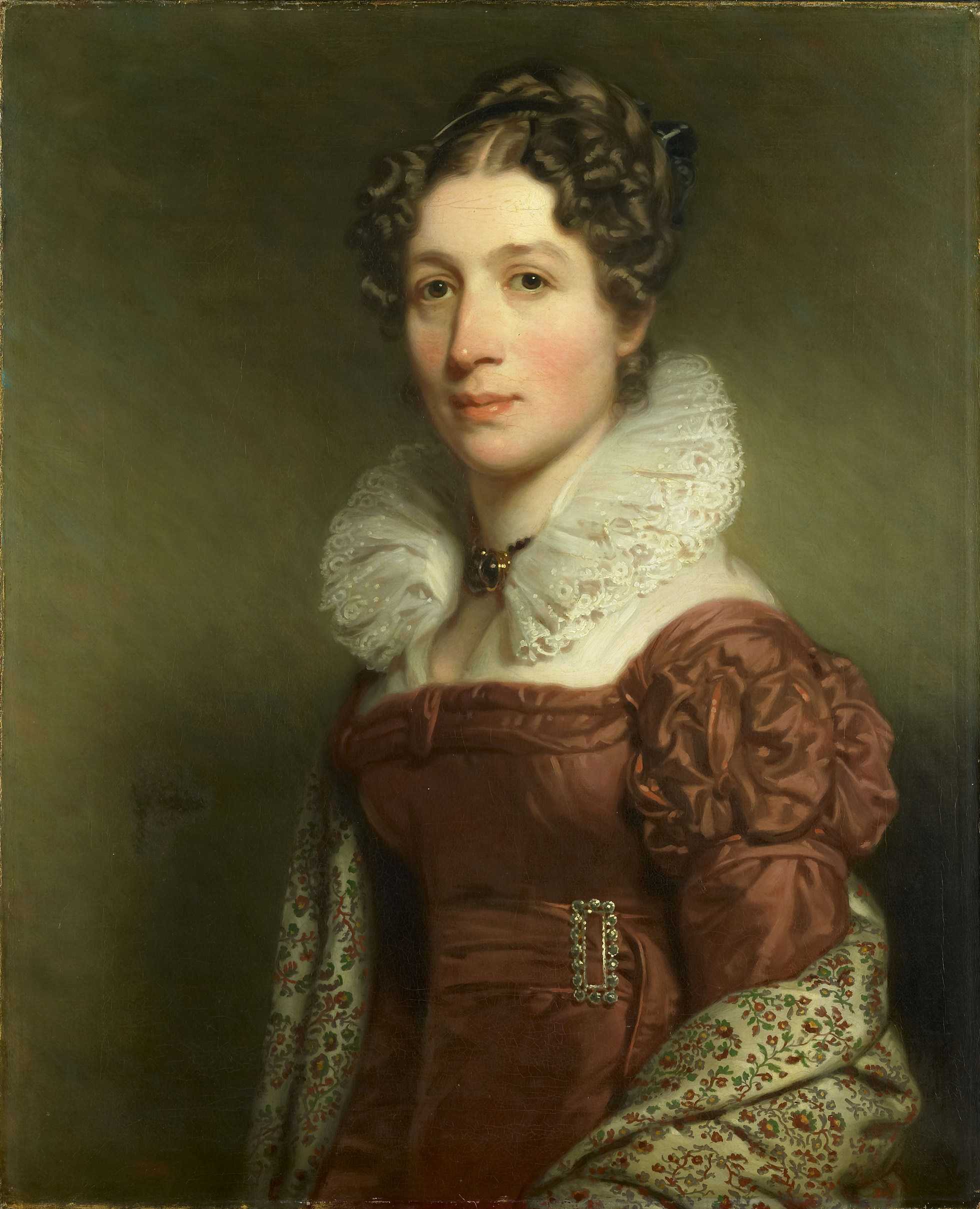
Jacoba Vetter (1837)
