= Carel Lodewijk Hansen =

Dutch painter

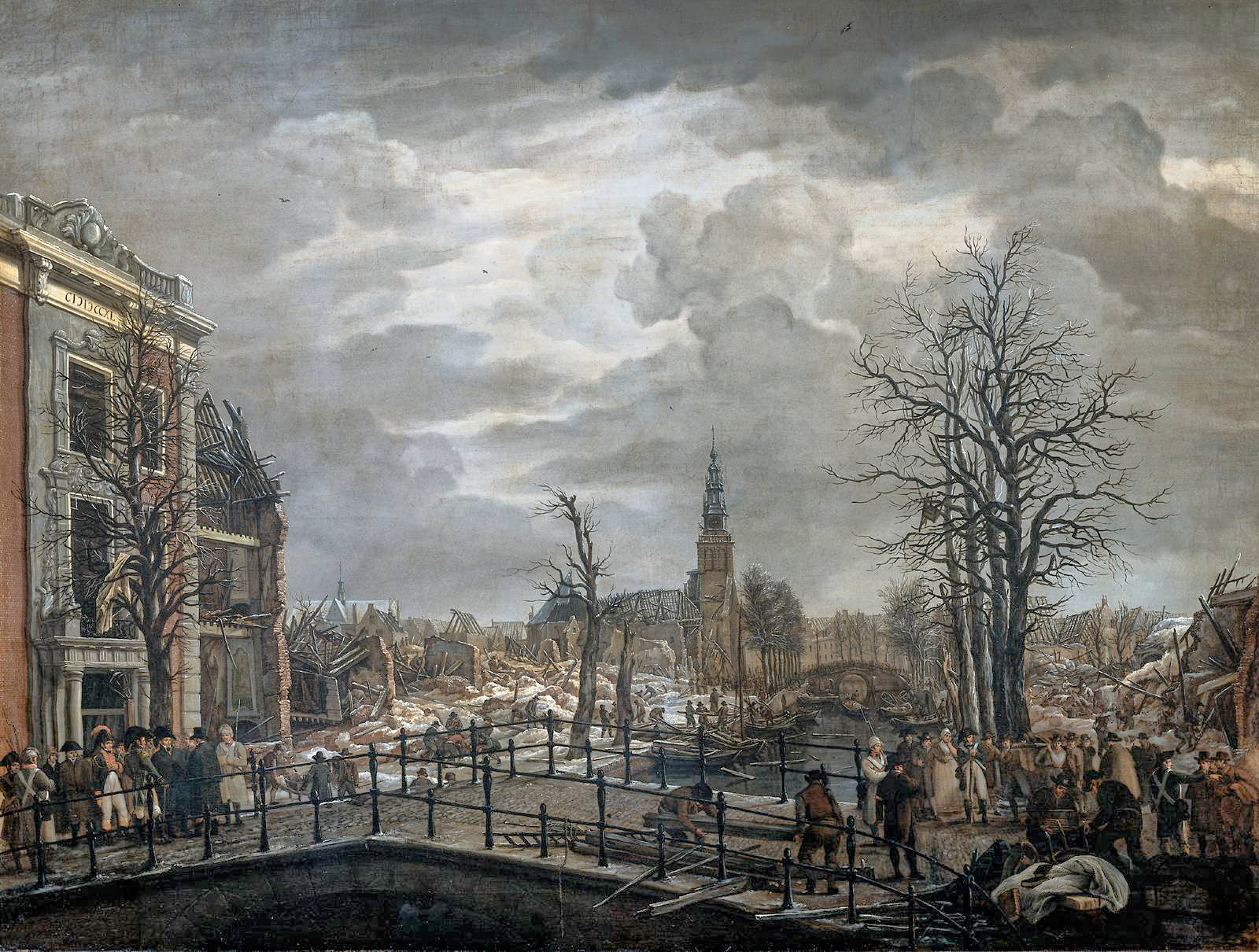
Rapenburg, Leiden, 1807, after the explosion of a powder ship on 12 January 1807, with Louis Bonaparte inspecting the damage on the left, collection Rijksmuseum.

Carel Lodewijk Hansen (1765, Amsterdam – 1840, Epe), was a 19th-century painter from the Netherlands.

== Biography ==
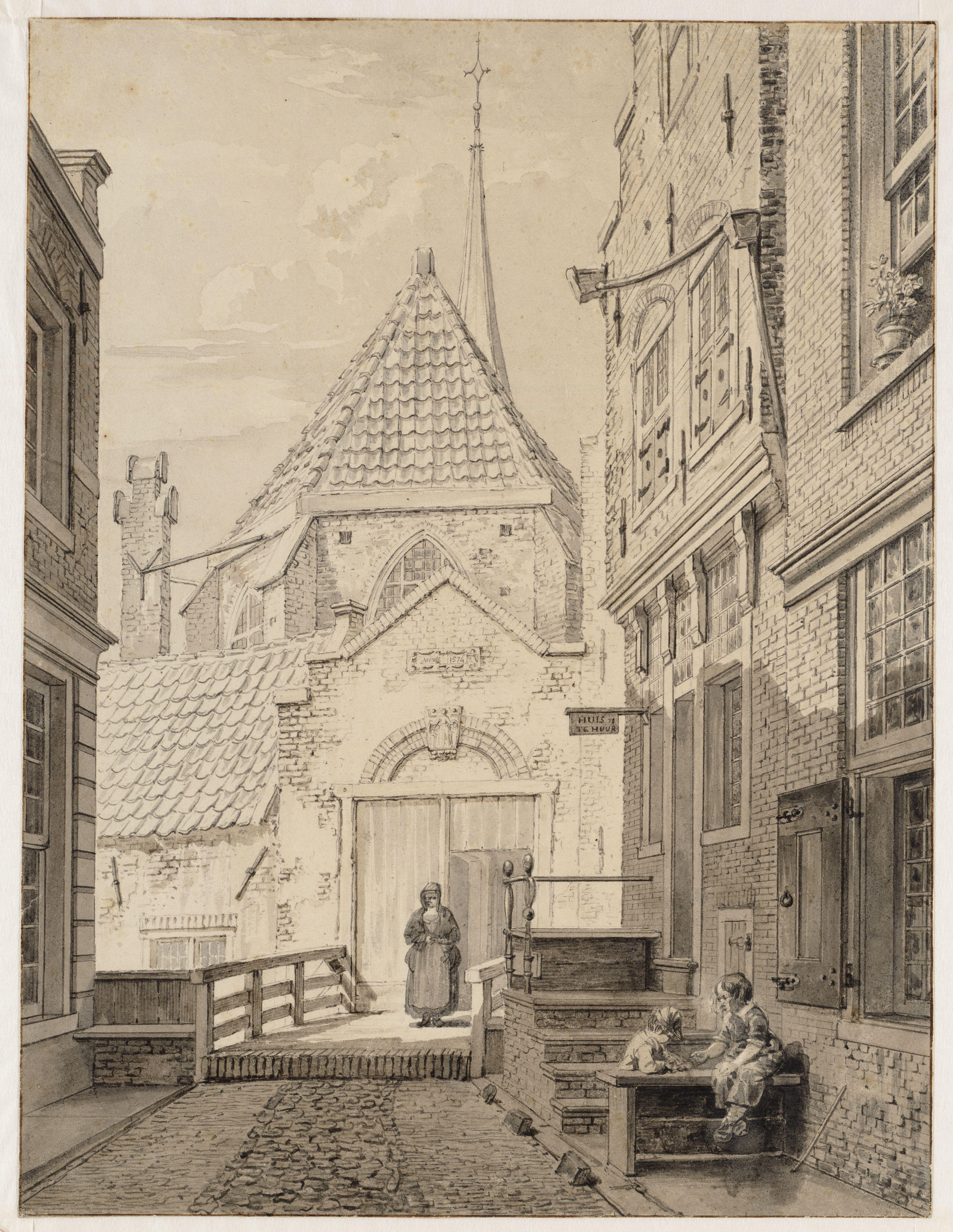
Begijnesteeg, Haarlem

According to the RKD he was a pupil of Pieter Pietersz Barbiers. He was the father and teacher of Carel Lodewijk II and Lambertus Johannes Hansen. He became a member of the Haarlem Guild of St. Luke in 1794, shortly before it was dissolved in 1797. He became a member of Felix Meritis in 1809. He received a gold medal in 1818 in the category "cityscapes". He is known for cityscapes and landscapes, often in moonlight. In 1807 he painted a cityscape of Leiden after a powder ship explosion wrecked several houses (and all of the stained glass in the churches) in the city center. Louis Bonaparte came personally to inspect the damage, which endeared him to the townspeople for his show of empathy. The painting echoes, but lacks the poignancy of Vermeer's View of Delft however, which shows the gap in the cityscape after the Delft Explosion of 1654 without showing the damage directly.

In 1816 he worked on a large Panorama of the battle of Waterloo in Amsterdam, that was compared favorably to the London version. His topographical cityscapes were etched by himself and others, with three published series showing scenes of Haarlem, Bergen, and Drente. Original etched works are in the Teylers Museum, the Amsterdam city archives, and the Albertina in Vienna.
