= Portrait of Louis Bonaparte =

Painting by Charles Howard Hodges

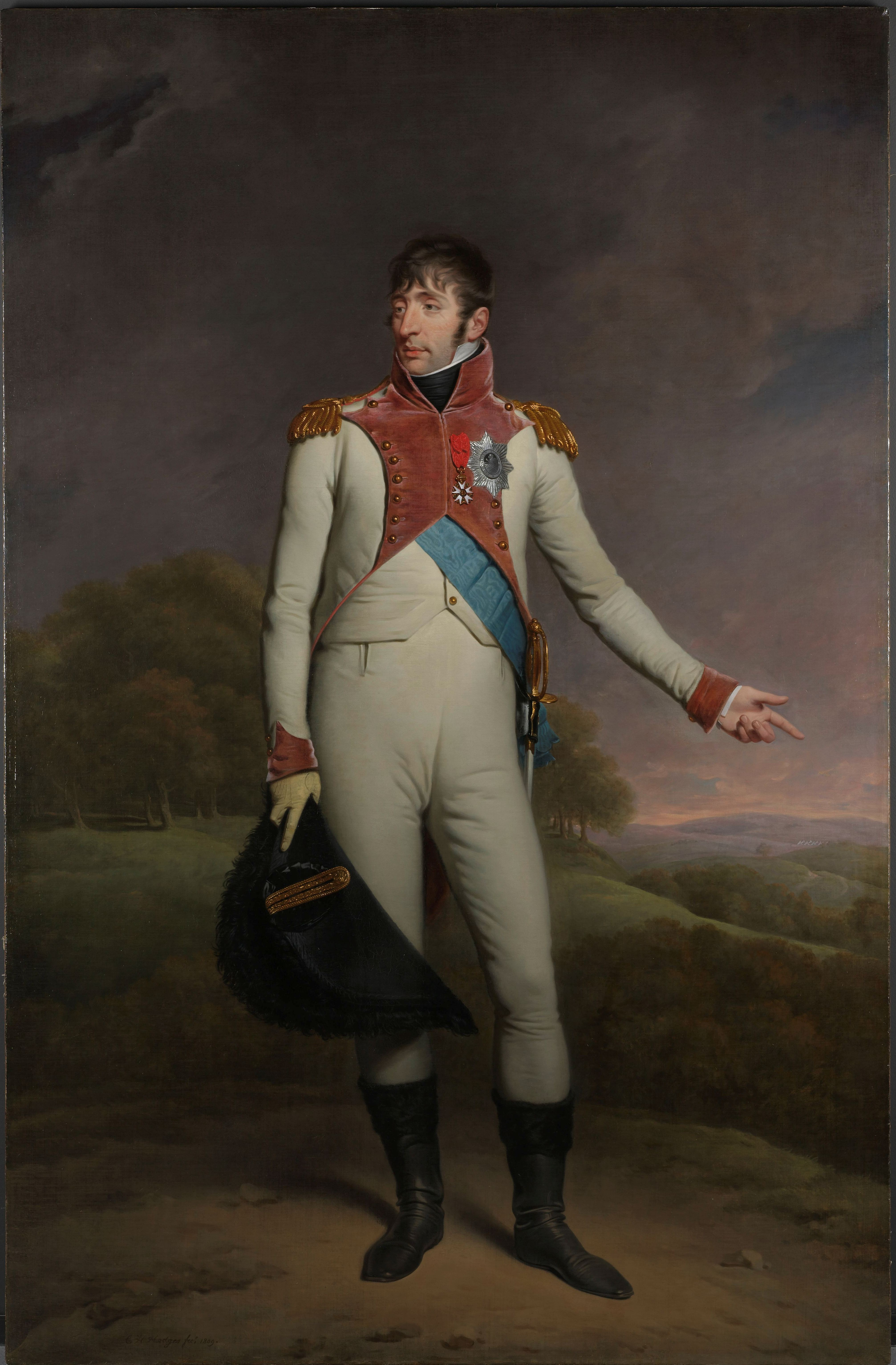
- Artist: Charles Howard Hodges
- Year: 1809
- Type: Oil on canvas, portrait painting
- Dimensions: 223 cm × 147 cm (88 in × 58 in)
- Location: Rijksmuseum; Amsterdam

Portrait of Louis Bonaparte is an 1809 portrait painting by the English painter Charles Howard Hodges. It depicts Louis Bonaparte, then King of Holland during the Napoleonic Wars. Louis had been placed on the throne in 1806 by his elder brother Napoleon to rule it as a client state of the French Empire. However, unimpressed by his brother's response to the Walcheren Expedition, Napoleon abolished the kingdom in 1810 and annexed the territory into France.

Louis is portrayed at full-length in the uniform of the Dutch Life Guards, wearing the Grand Cross of the Royal Order of the Union of Holland and the French Legion of Honour. The painting is today in the Rijksmuseum in Amsterdam.

== Bibliography ==
- Koch, Jeroen, Van der Meulen, Dik & Van Zanten, Jeroen. The House of Orange in Revolution and War: A European History, 1772–1890. Reaktion Books, 2022.
- Paolucci, Antonio. Great Museums of Europe: The Dream of the Universal Museum. Skira, 2002.
- Van Der Feltz, A.C.A.W. Charles Howard Hodges, 1764-1837. Van Gorcum, 1982.
