= Johannes Jelgerhuis =

Dutch painter (1770–1836)

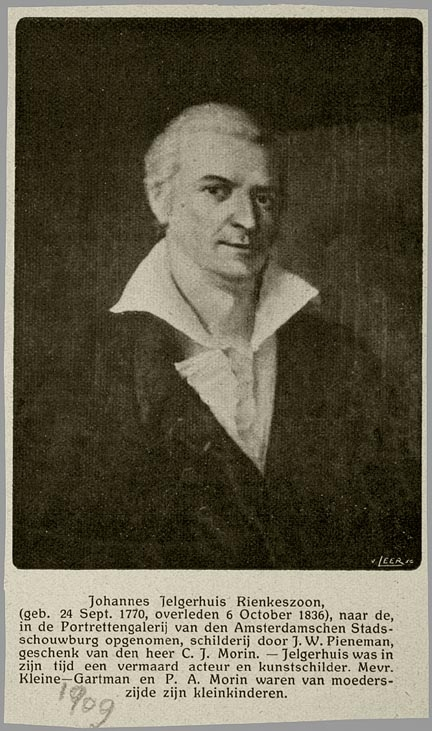
Portrait of Johannes Jelgerhuis by Jan Willem Pieneman

Johannes Jelgerhuis (24 September, 1770 in Leeuwarden – 6 October 1836 in Amsterdam), was a 19th-century painter and actor from the Netherlands.

== Biography ==
According to the RKD he was the pupil of his father Rienk Jelgerhuis and Pieter Pietersz Barbiers. From 1808 he became an actor in the Stadsschouwburg (Amsterdam) and wrote an illustrated instruction booklet for actors. In 1820 he started teaching acting lessons in Amsterdam and he invited his former colleague Johanna Wattier to help.

He was also known for interiors and architectural studies, with a good eye for perspective. His painting of the interior of the bookshop of his publisher is in the collection of the Rijksmuseum. He painted topographical works in Delft, Rotterdam, Ghent, and Amsterdam.

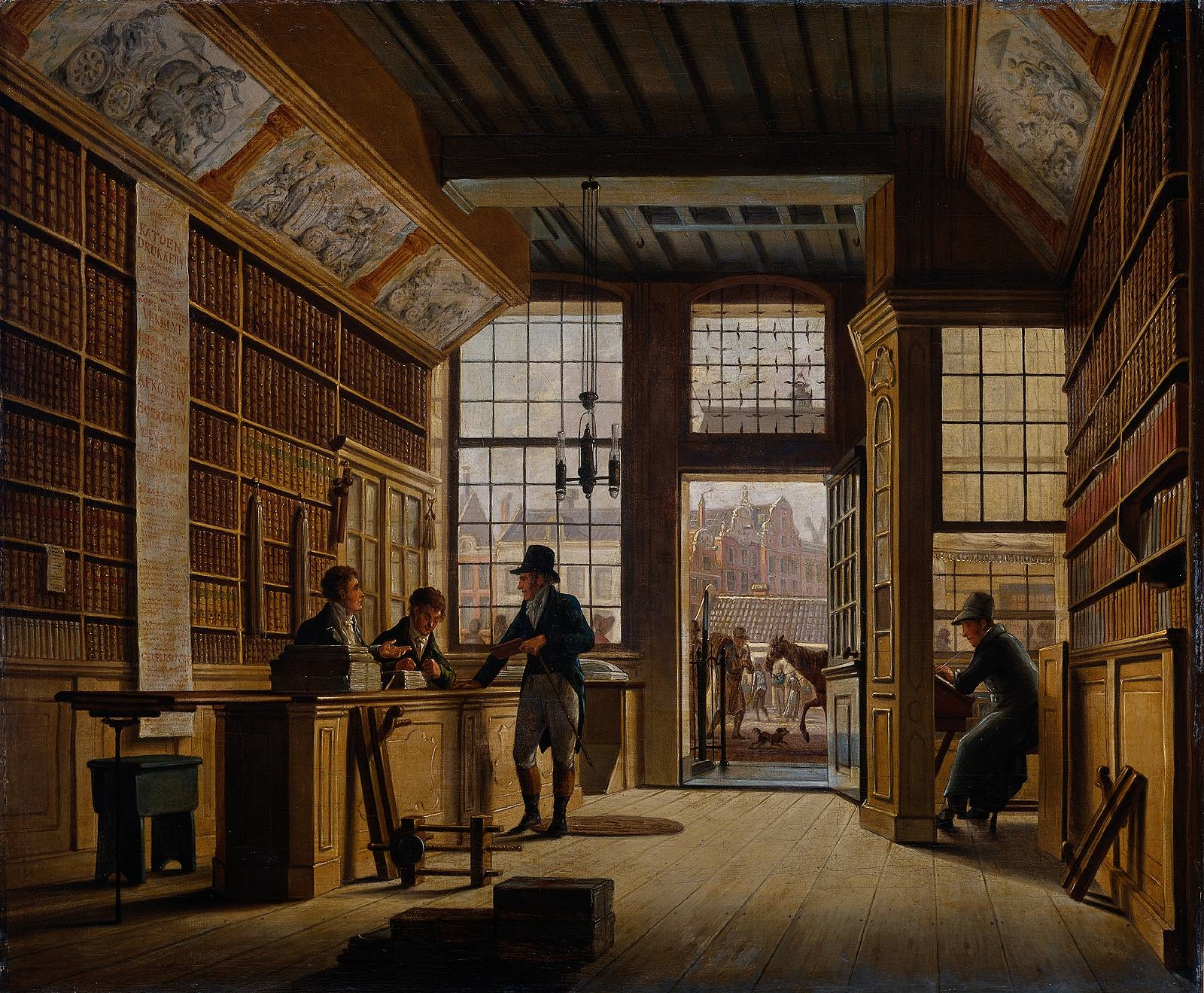
Interior of the bookshop of his publisher, 1820

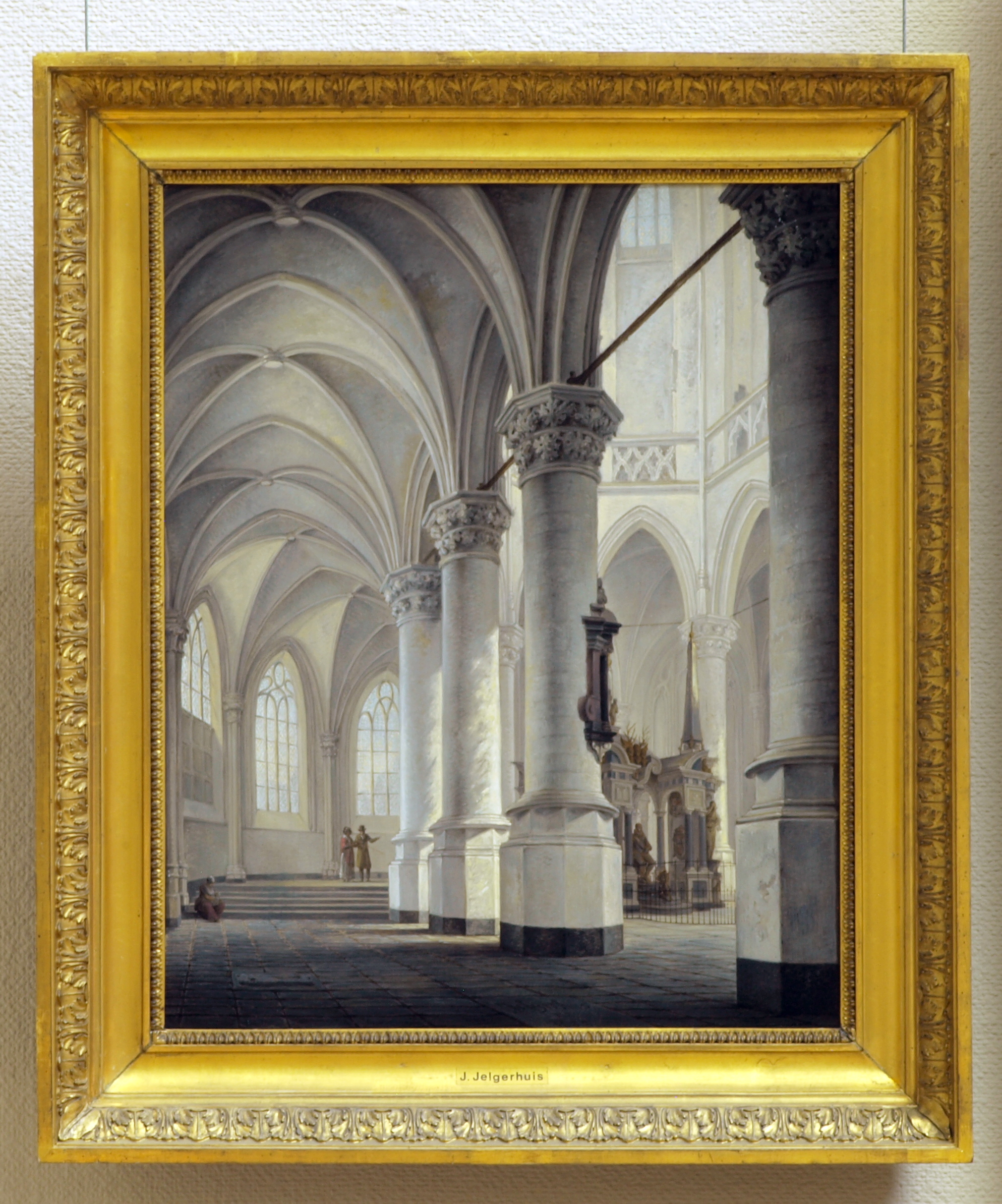
A view of the Nieuwe Kerk (Delft) with the tomb of Willem the Silent, collection Teylers Museum
