= Rienk Jelgerhuis =

Dutch painter

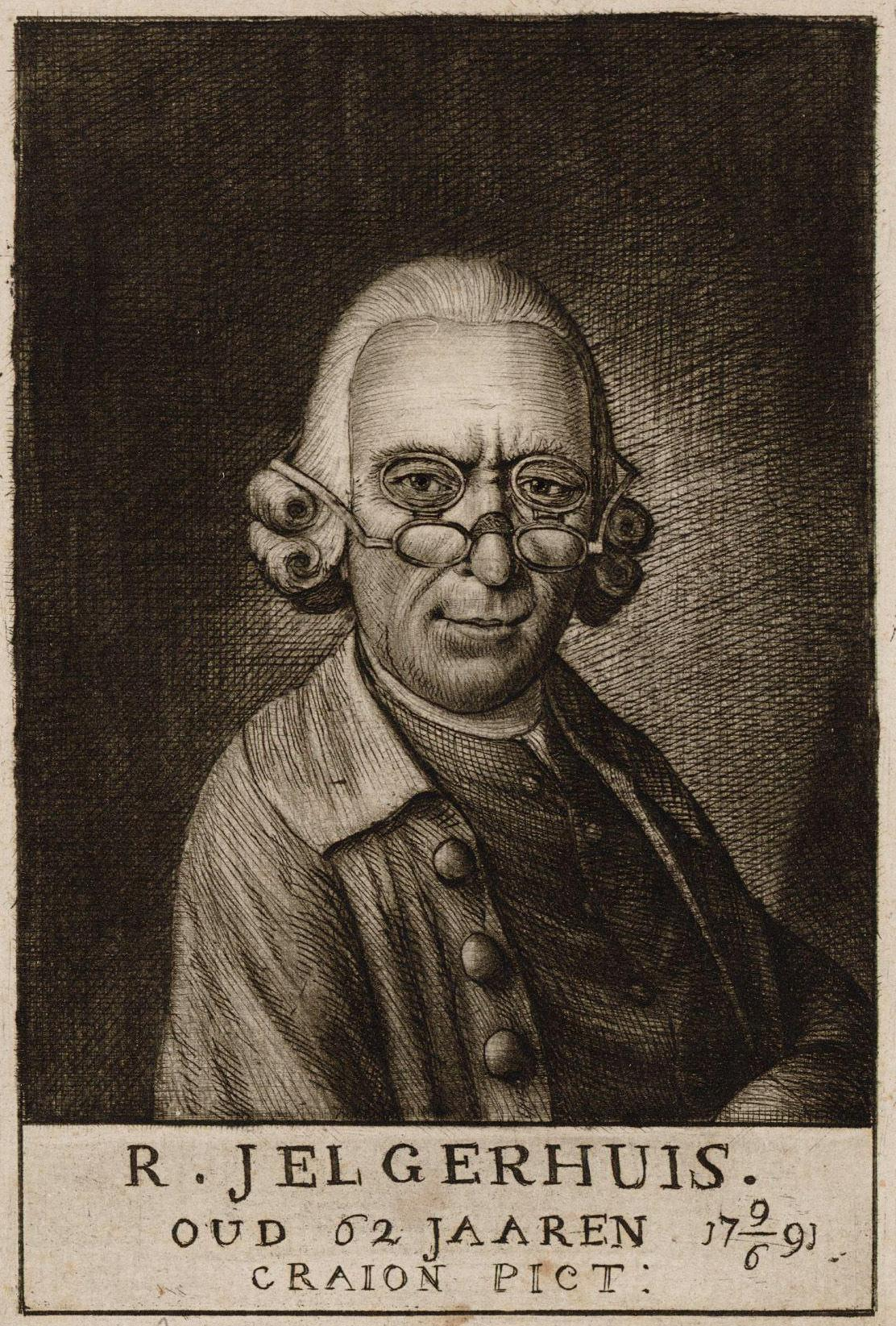
Self-portrait at the age of 62

Rienk Jelgerhuis (13 April 1729 – 17 April 1806) was a Dutch painter, engraver and draftsman.

Jelgerhuis was born in Leeuwarden. He mainly made his fame as a travelling portrait-painter and has no fewer than 7,763 portraits standing to his credit. He taught his son, Johannes Jelgerhuis, who became an accomplished painter, illustrator and actor. Rienk Jelgerhuis died in Amsterdam.
