= Henricus Franciscus Wiertz =

Dutch painter

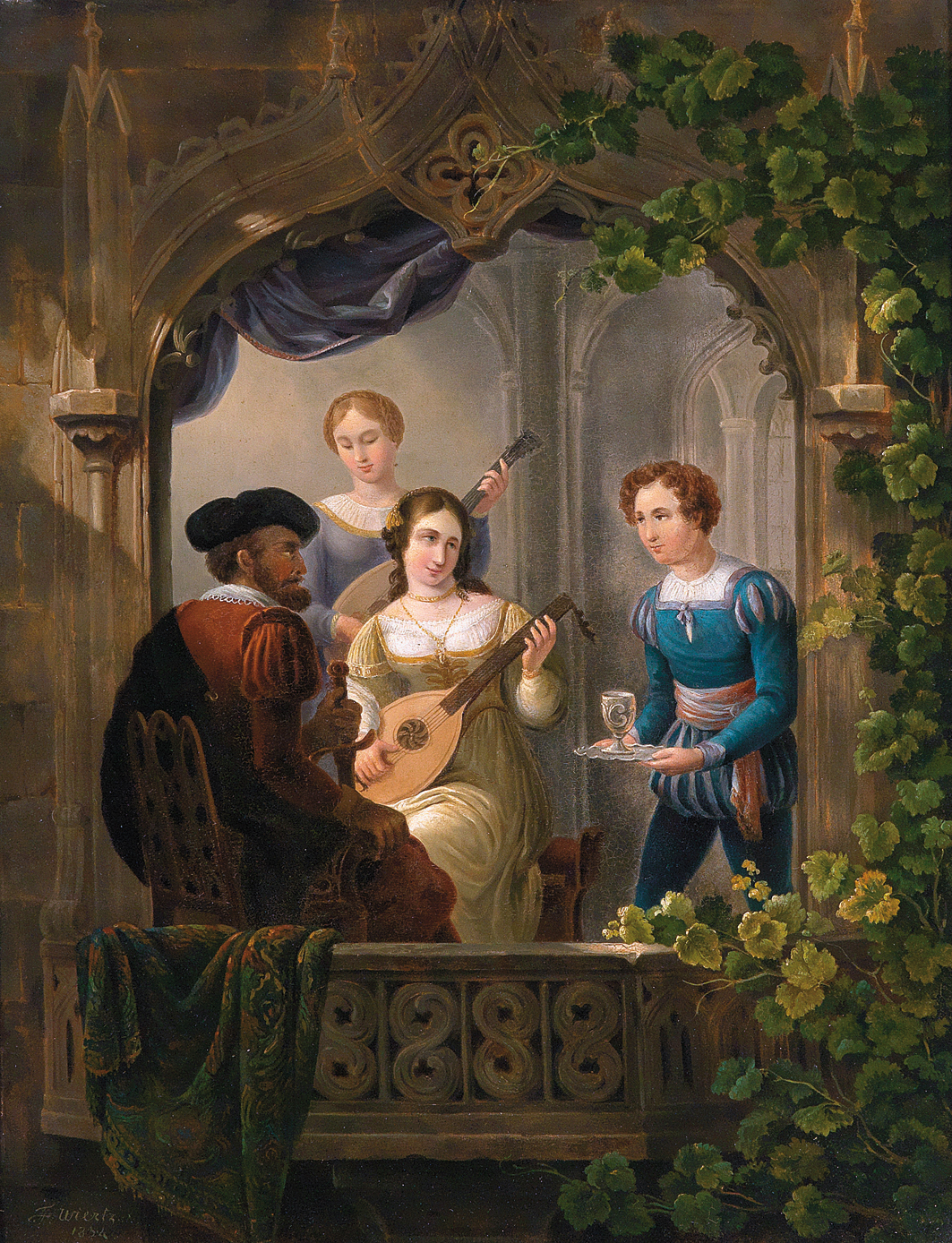
Musical entertainment on the balcony, 1834

Henricus Franciscus Wierix (1784 – 1858), was a 19th-century painter from the Netherlands.

== Biography ==
He was born in Amsterdam and became the pupil of the genre painter Jacobus Johannes Lauwers and after he died in 1800, of Lauwers' brother-in-law Johannes de Frey. He then studied perspective under Pieter Pietersz Barbiers and began to make landscapes. He won gold medals for his drawings of nudes from Kunst Zij Ons Doel and Felix Meritis in 1809, 1810, and 1811. He moved to Nijmegen in 1811 and is known for landscapes and portraits and taught Christiaan Wilhelmus Moorrees. He died in Nijmegen.
