= Maria Geertruida Snabilie =

Dutch painter

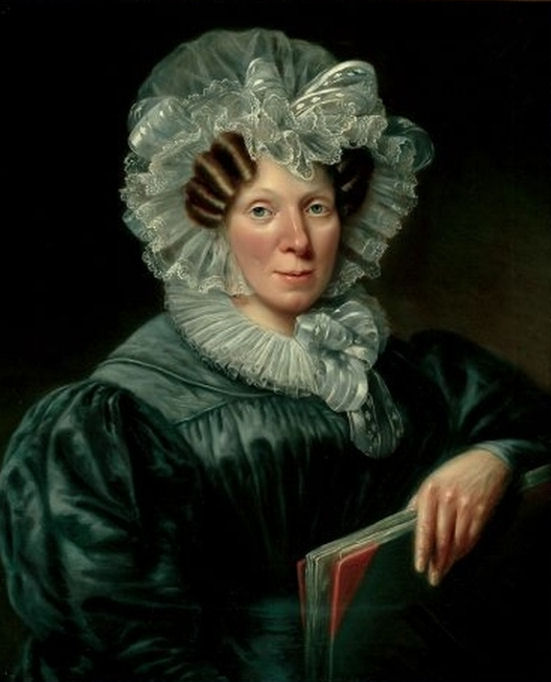
Portrait of Maria Geertruida Snabilie by her husband (pendant to his selfportrait)

Maria Geertruida Snabilie (1776–1838) was a 19th-century painter from the Netherlands.

== Biography ==
She was born in Haarlem as the daughter of Louis Snabilié (c. 1730 – 1784) and Helena Krame. She became a flower painter and married Pieter Barbiers III in 1796 and became the mother of Pieter Barbiers IV and Maria Geertruida Barbiers. After marriage she signed her works "B.S." for Barbiers-Snabilie.

She died in Haarlem.

== Works ==
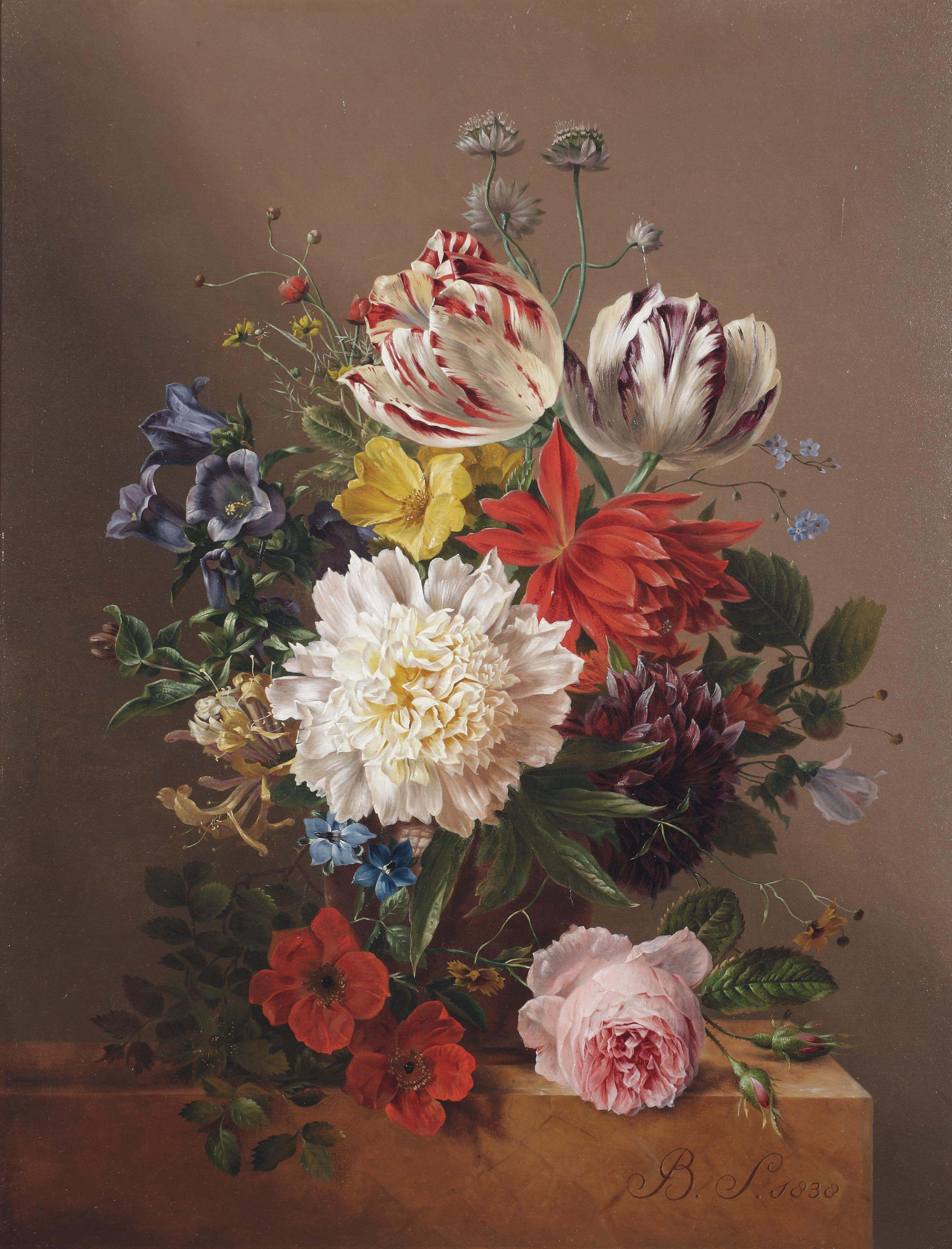
Flowers in a Vase, 1838

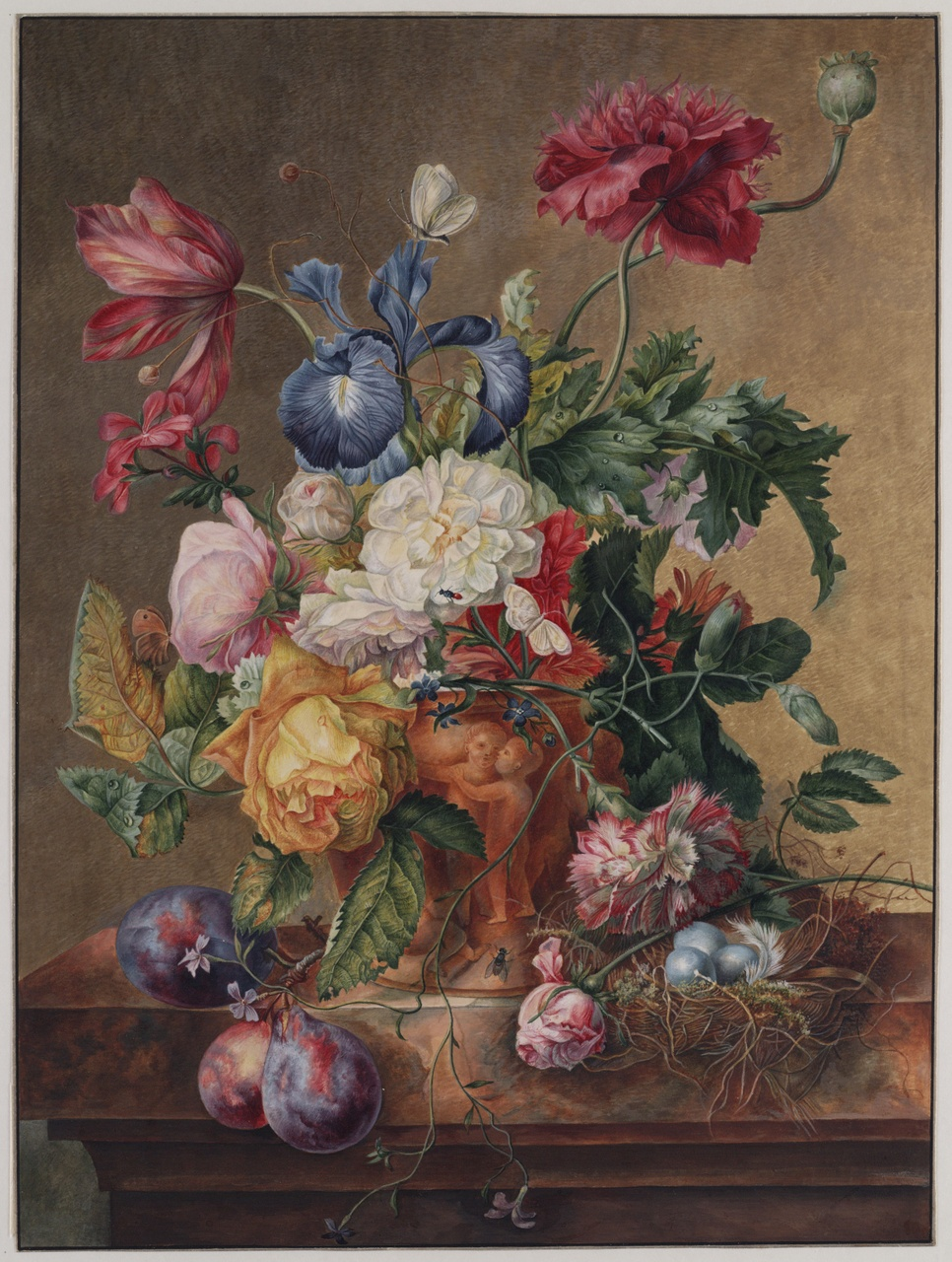
Flower Still Life

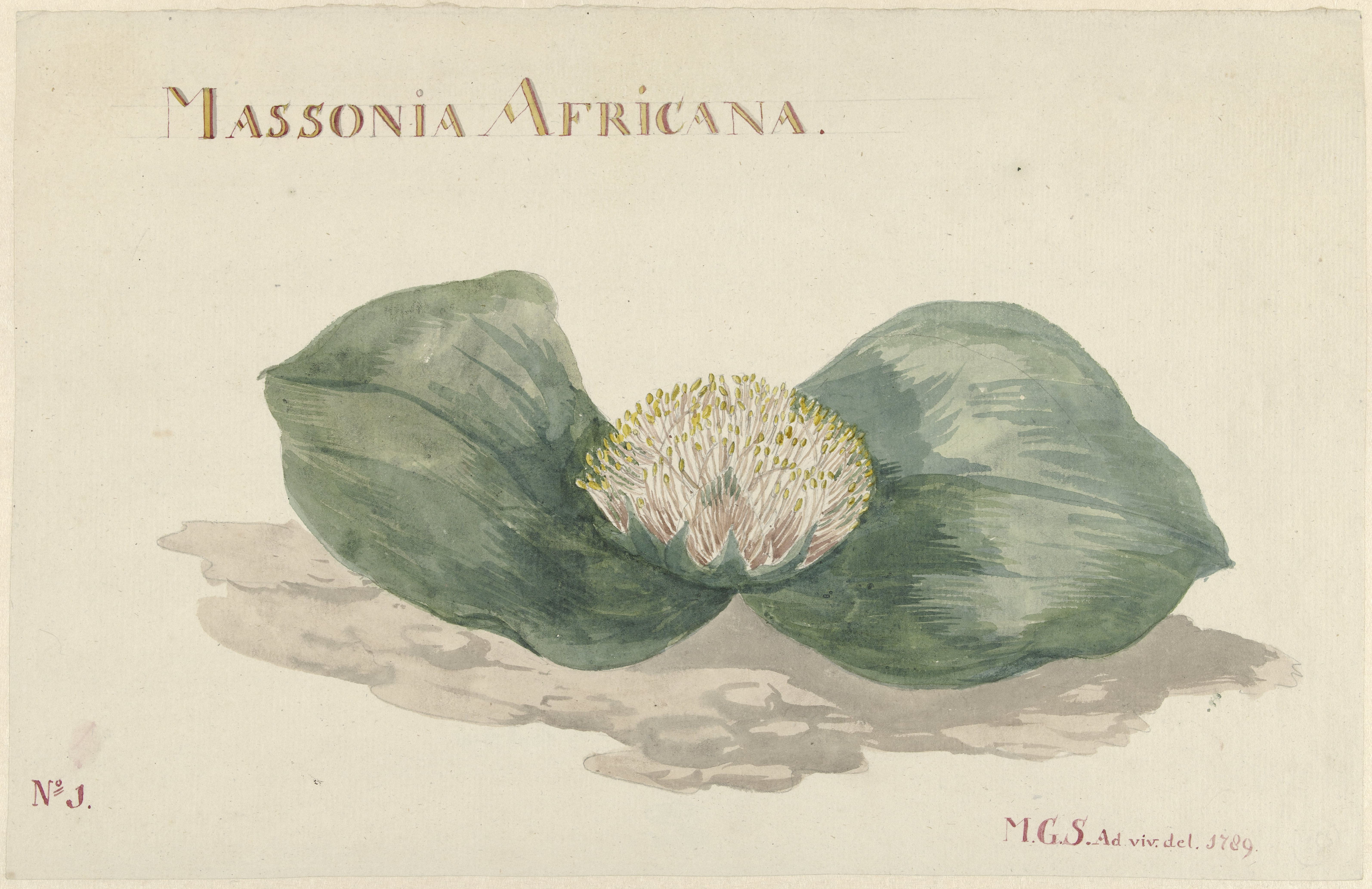
Massionia Africana (1789)

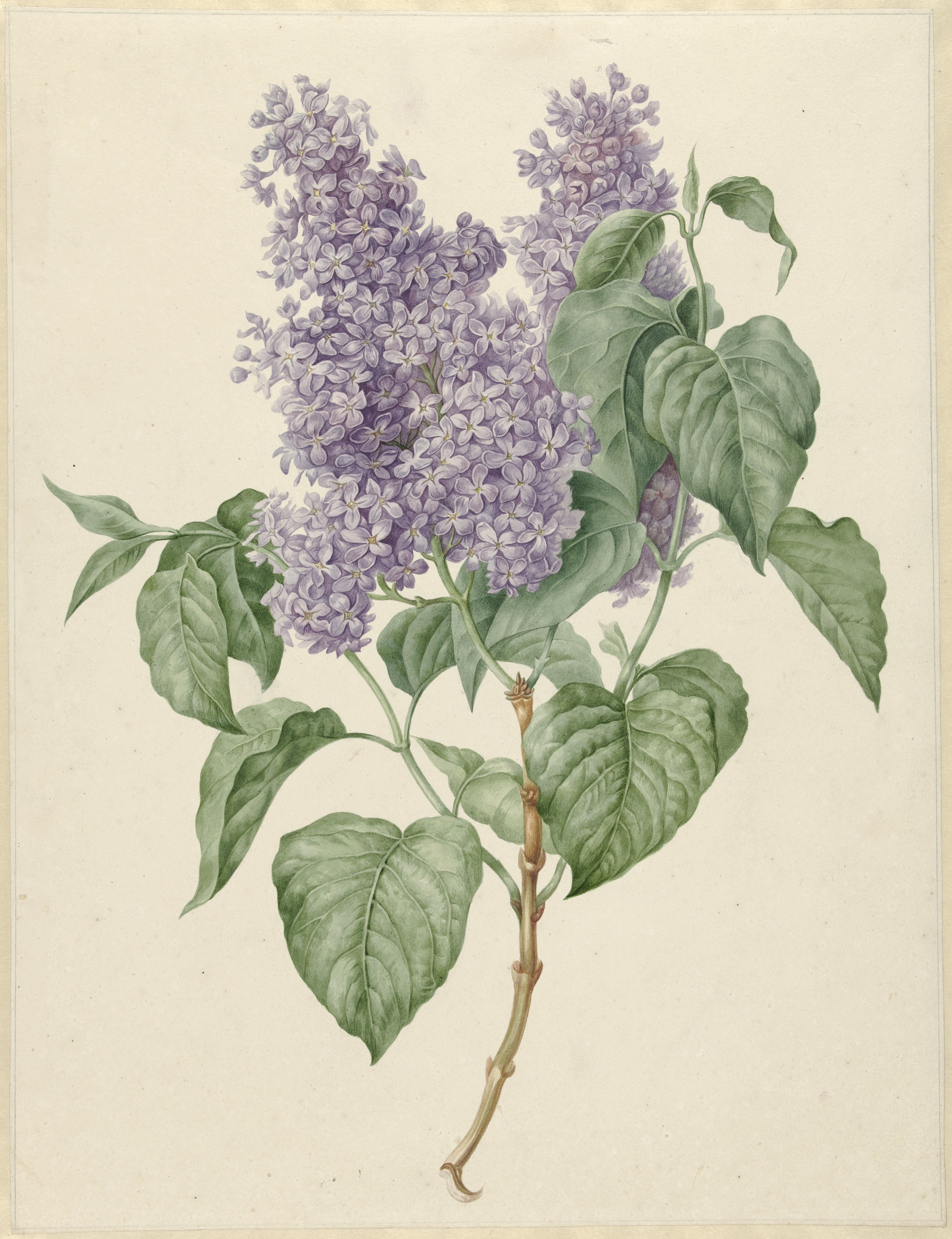
Lilac
