= Maria Geertruida Barbiers =

Dutch painter (1801–1879)

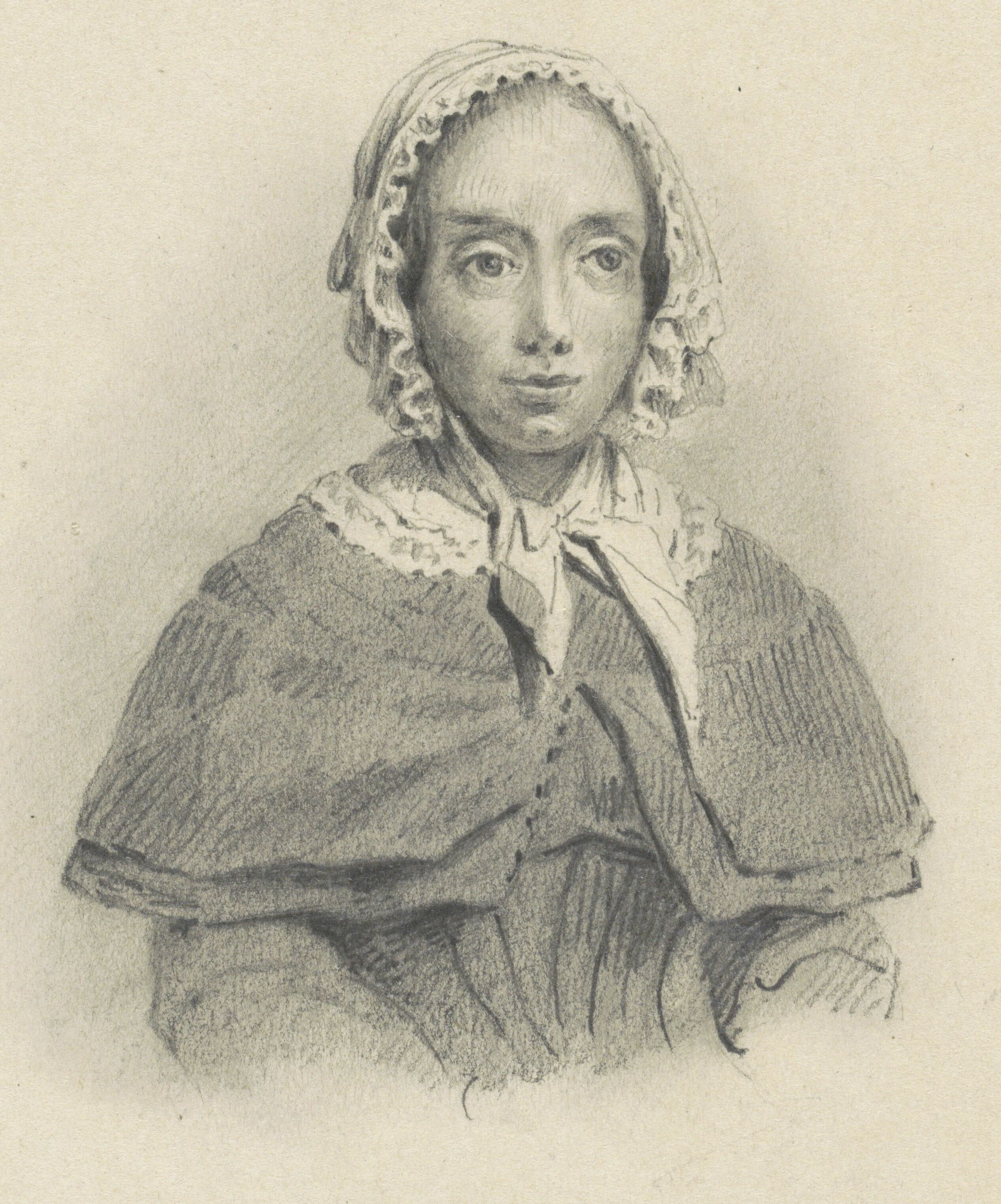
- Born: 25 January 1801; Haarlem, Netherlands
- Died: 30 January 1879 (aged 78); Haarlem, Netherlands
- Known for: Painting
- Spouse: Pieter de Goeje (m. 1823)

Maria Geertruida Barbiers (25 January 1801 – 30 January 1879) was a 19th-century painter from the Netherlands.

== Biography ==
She was born in Haarlem as the daughter of Pieter Barbiers III and Maria Geertruida Snabilie. Her brother Pieter Barbiers IV and sister Caecilia Geertruida also became painters. In 1823, she married the painter Pieter de Goeje. She is known for flower still lifes, and often signed her works M.G. de Goeje Barbiers.

She died in Haarlem.

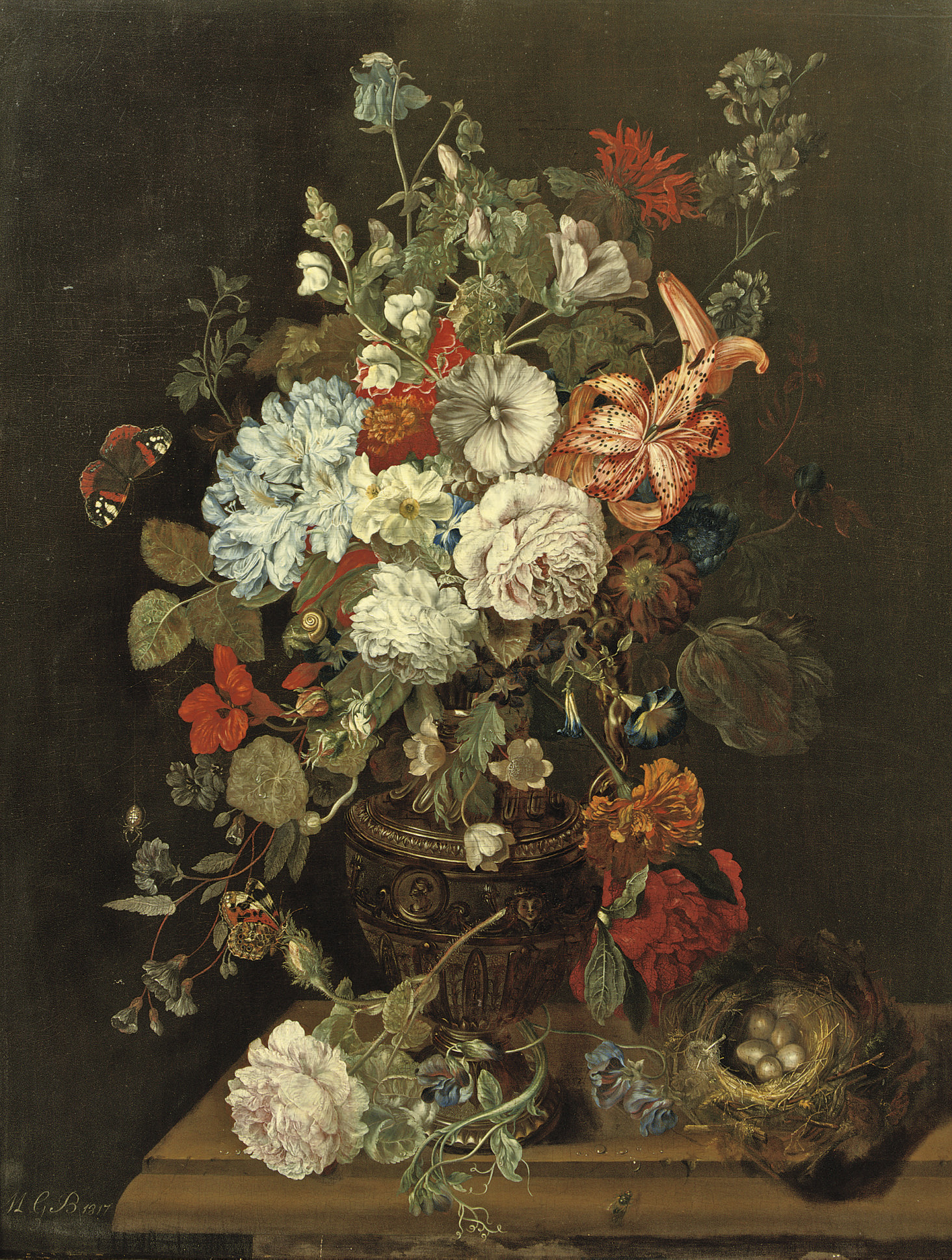
Still life with flowers, a bird's nest and butterflies (1817)
