= Bartholomeus Barbiers =

Dutch painter (1743-1808)

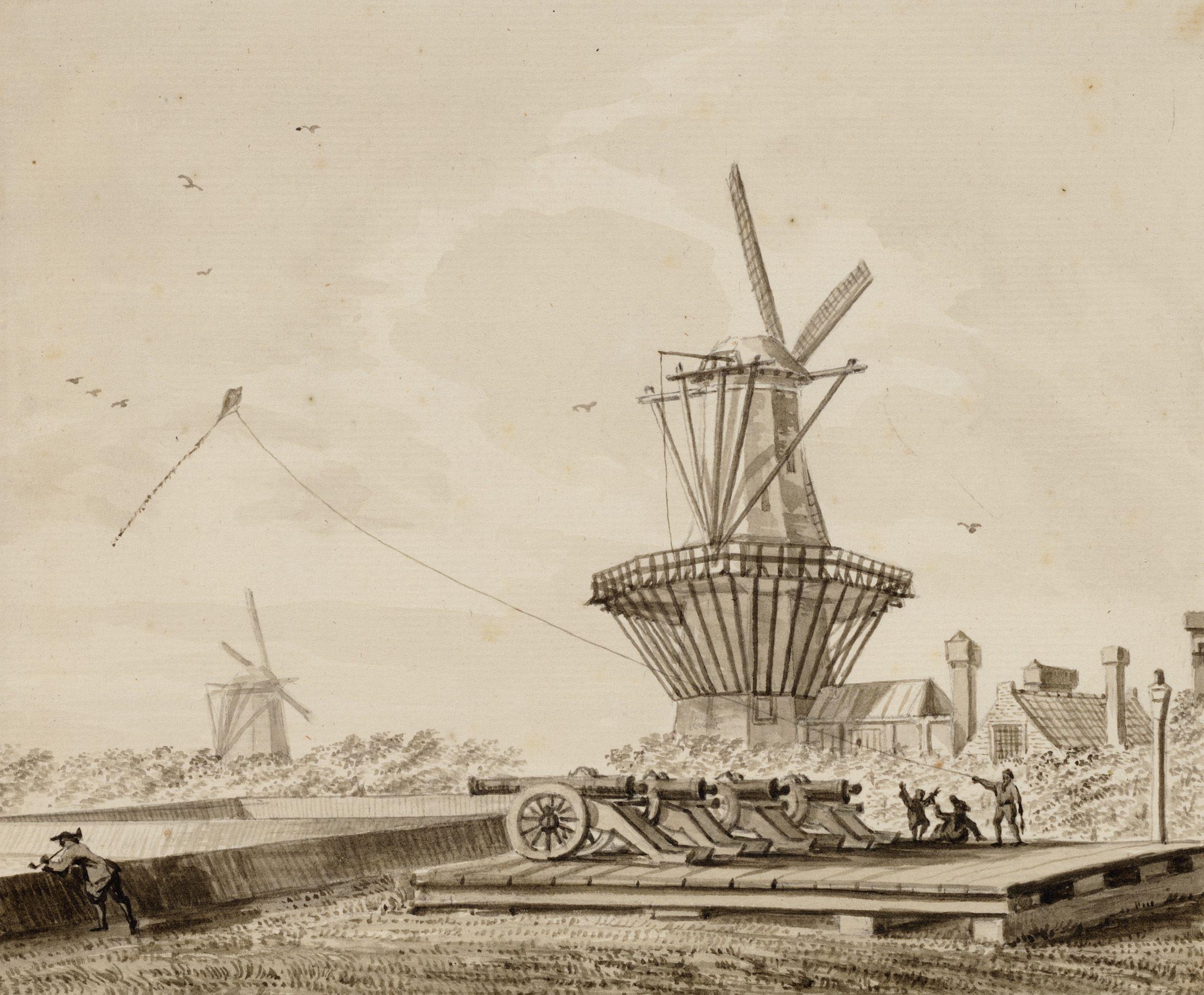
- Born: Amsterdam
- Died: January 1808; Amsterdam

Bartholomeus Barbiers (bapt. 11 January 1743, Amsterdam – 1808, Amsterdam) was a 19th-century painter from the Dutch Republic and later the Kingdom of the Netherlands. He is also referred to as Bartholomeus Barbiers I, to distinguish him from his family members with the same name.

== Biography ==
He was born and died in Amsterdam. According to the Netherlands Institute for Art History he was the son and pupil of Pieter Barbiers (1717–1780), and the brother of Pieter Pietersz Barbiers. His son Pieter Bartholomeusz Barbiers was also a painter.

He was a skilful landscape painter, and left-handed.
