= Pieter Barbiers IV =

Dutch painter (1798-1848)

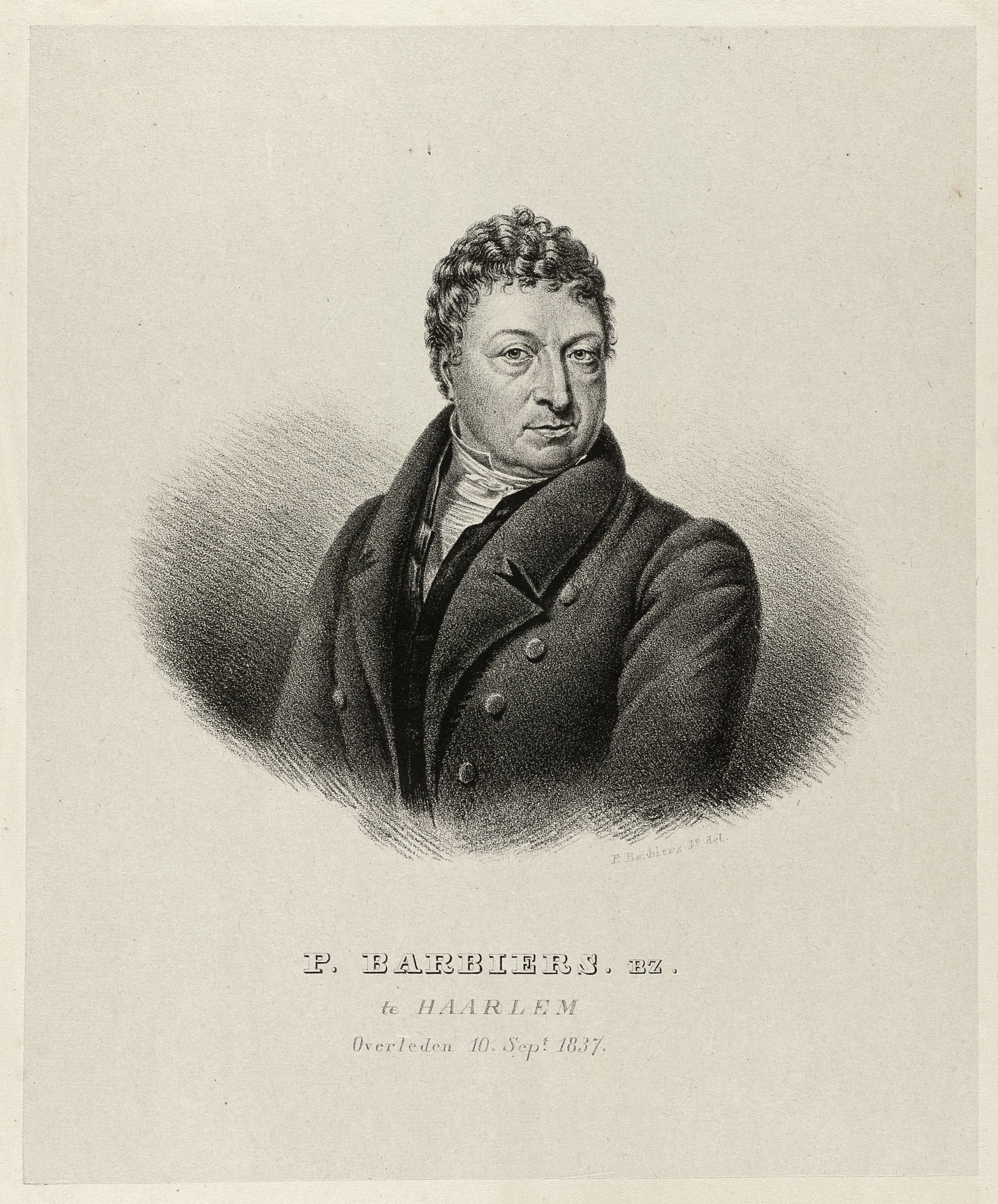
- Born: 27 April 1798; Haarlem
- Died: 29 November 1848 (aged 50)
- Occupation: Painter, graphic artist, drawer, etcher, lithographer, art educator, printmaker

Pieter Barbiers IV (1798 – 1848) was a 19th-century painter from the Netherlands.

== Biography ==
He was born in Haarlem as the son of Pieter Bartholomeusz Barbiers (III) and Maria Geertruida Snabilie. His sister Maria Geertruida Barbiers became a flower painter.

He made silhouettes from the living model, but who also made engravings after paintings or drawings by other artists for biographical prints. He married Maria Agnes Meyerink in 1838 in Kampen, who continued his business in prints and silhouettes after his death as Wed. Barbiers te Zwolle.

He died in Zwolle.

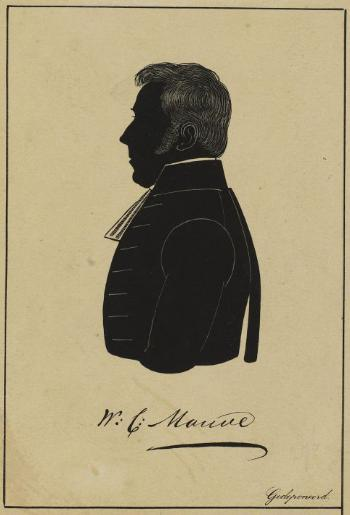
Silhouette of Willem Carel Mauve

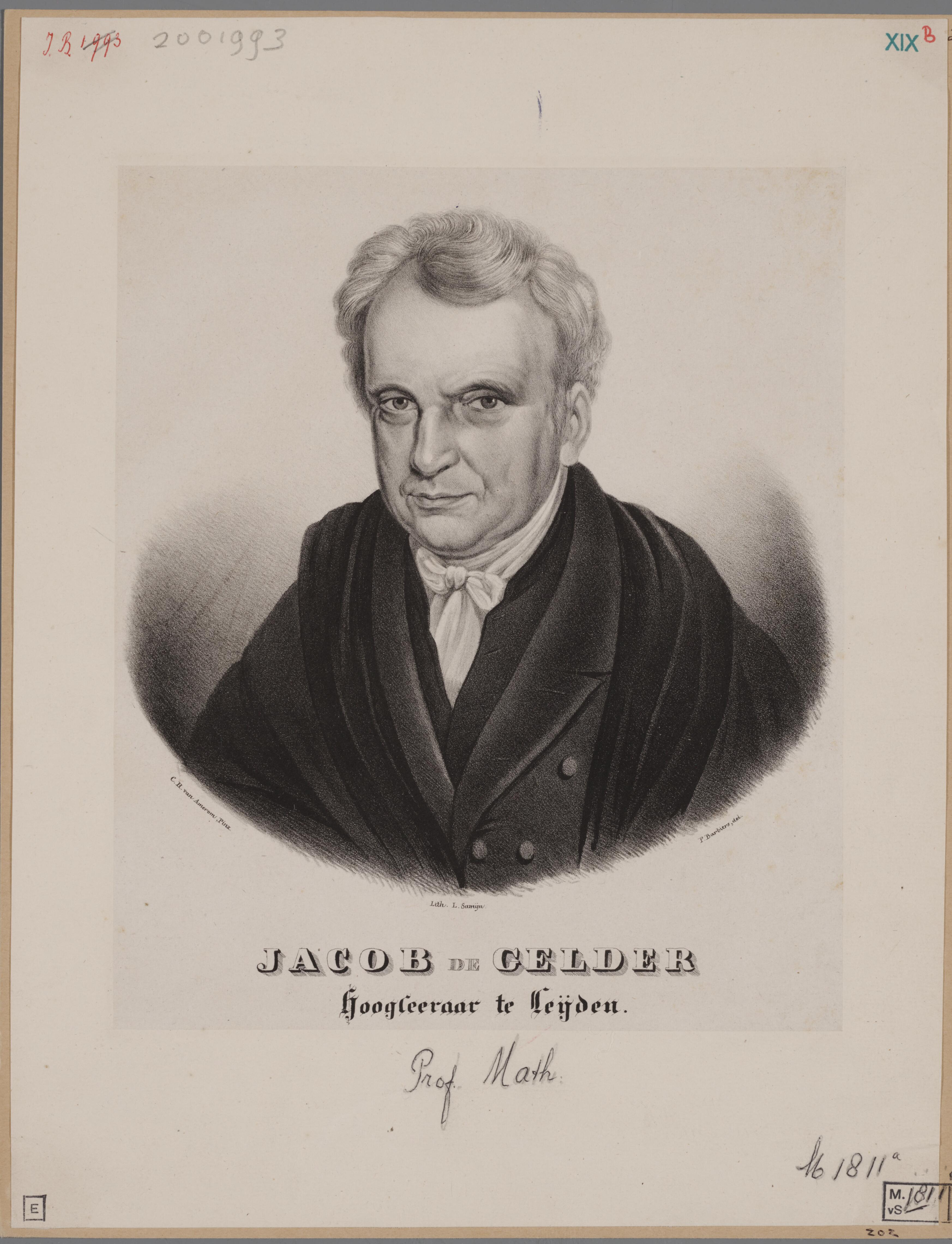
Print of Jacob de Gelder
