= Pieter Pietersz Barbiers =

Dutch painter (1749-1842)

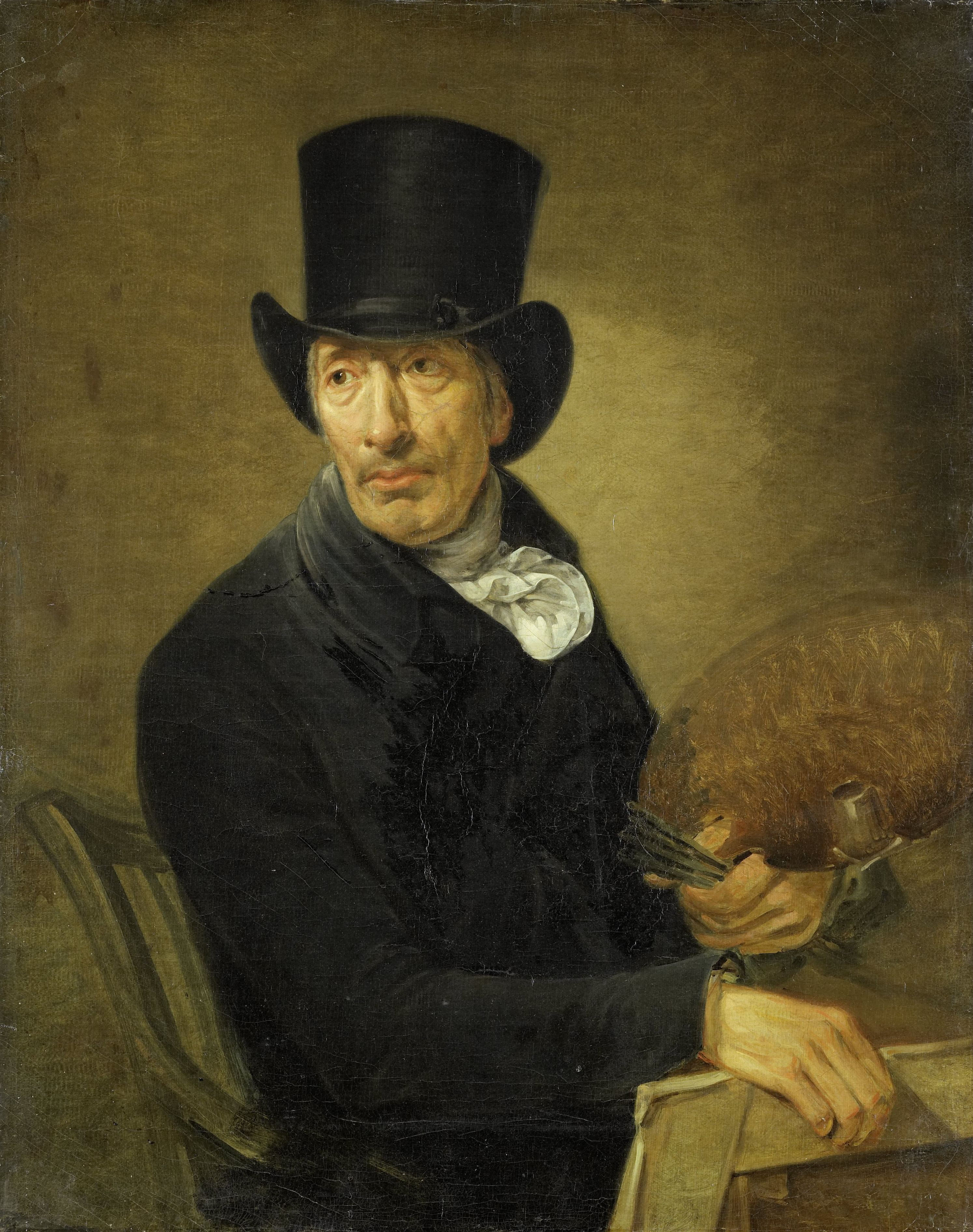
- Portrait by Jean Augustin Daiwaille (ca. 1820)
- Born: 26 October 1749; Amsterdam
- Died: 26 October 1842 (aged 93); Amsterdam
- Occupation: Painter, drawer, drawing teacher, wallpaper painter, etcher
- Children: Bartholomeus Barbiers

Pieter Pieterzoon (abbr. Pietersz.) Barbiers (bapt. 26 October 1749, Amsterdam – 26 October 1842, Amsterdam) was a 19th-century painter from the Dutch Republic and later the Kingdom of the Netherlands. He is also referred to as Pieter Barbiers II, to distinguish him from his family members with the same name.

== Biography ==
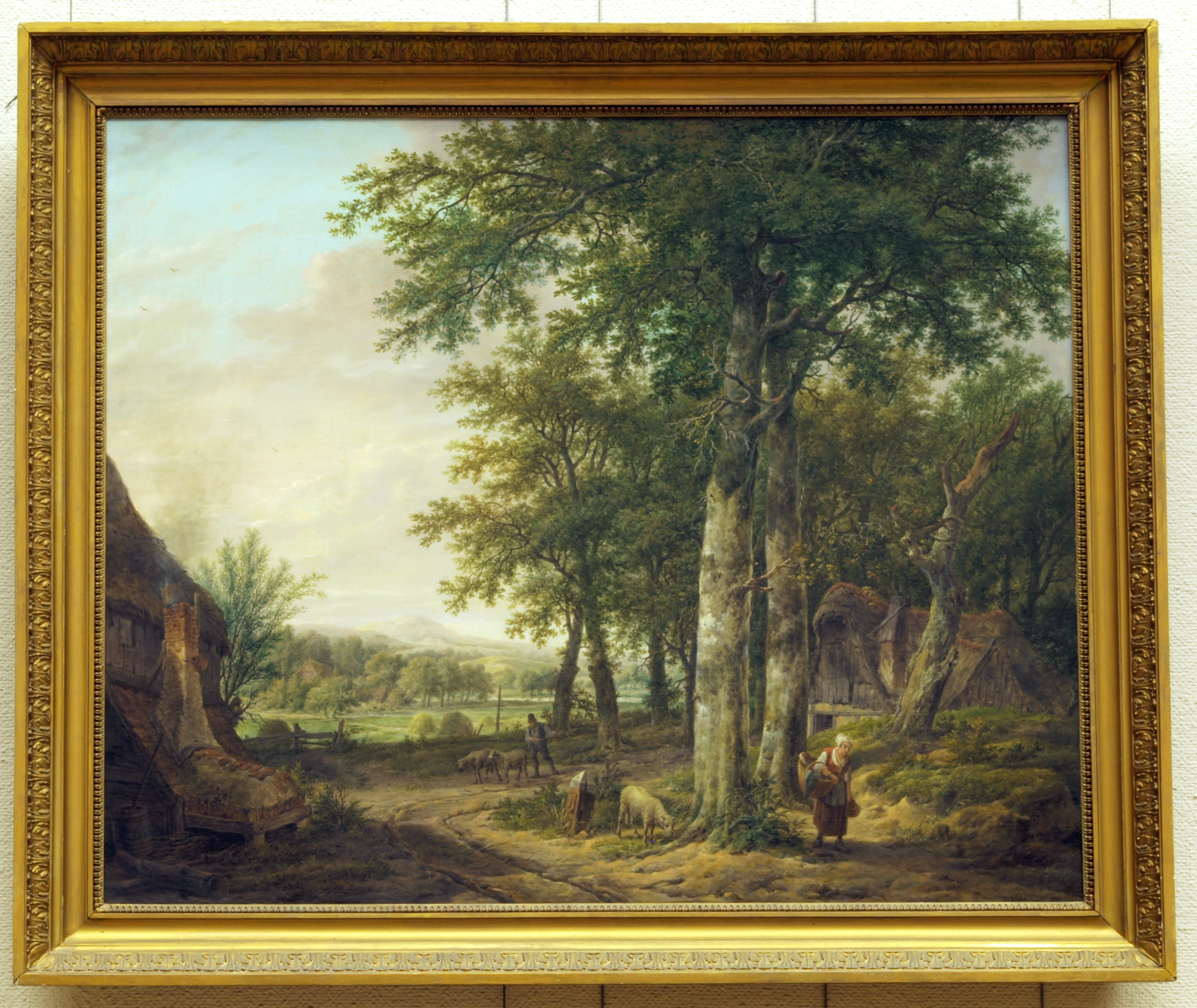
Pastoral landscape with figures (1819), Teylers Museum

According to the Netherlands Institute for Art History he was the son of Pieter Barbiers (1717–1780) and the brother of Bartholomeus Barbiers.

He became a member of the Amsterdam Guild of St. Luke in 1786, but the group dissolved in 1796 when the guilds were abolished during the French occupation. He became a member of the Royal Academy of Amsterdam in 1822. His pupils were his nephew Bartholomeus Barbiers the Younger, and the following students at the academy: Carel Lodewijk Hansen, Jan Hulswit, Johannes Jelgerhuis, Daniël Kerkhoff, Johannes Hendrik Knoop, Thomas van Leent, Jacobus Pelgrom, Petrus Antonius Ravelli, Abraham Johannes Ruytenschildt, Johan Christiaan Willem Safft, Barend Hendrik Thier, Pier Johannes de Visser, and Henricus Franciscus Wiertz.

He is known for his fine landscapes, often representing the environments of Guelders, Drenthe, and Haarlem.
