= Pieter Bartholomeusz Barbiers =

Dutch painter

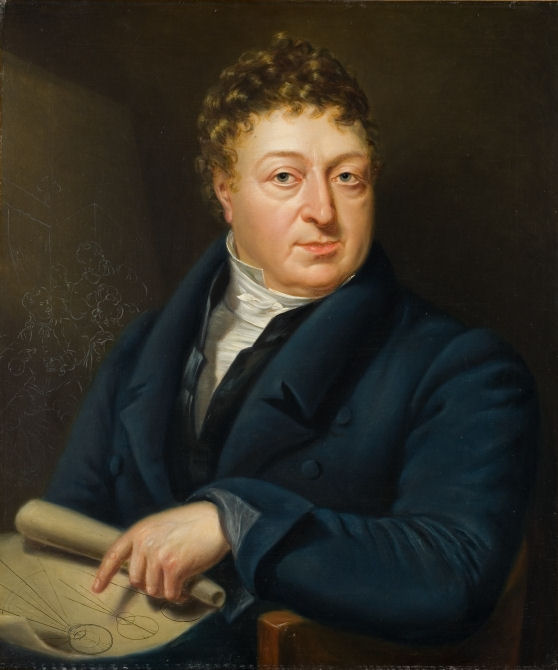
Selfportrait

Pieter Bartholomeusz Barbiers (bapt 23 January 1772, Amsterdam – 10 September 1837, Haarlem) was a Dutch painter, son of Bartholomeus Barbiers.

He married the painter Maria Geertruida Snabilie in Haarlem and was known as a historical and landscape painter. His children were Pieter Barbiers IV, Caecilia Geertruida and Maria Geertruida. In 1812 he made a view of the abbey ruins of Rijnsburg before they were demolished altogether, and this drawing was later engraved by Joannes Pieter Visser Bender.
