= Pieter Barbiers (painter) =

Dutch painter (1717–1780))

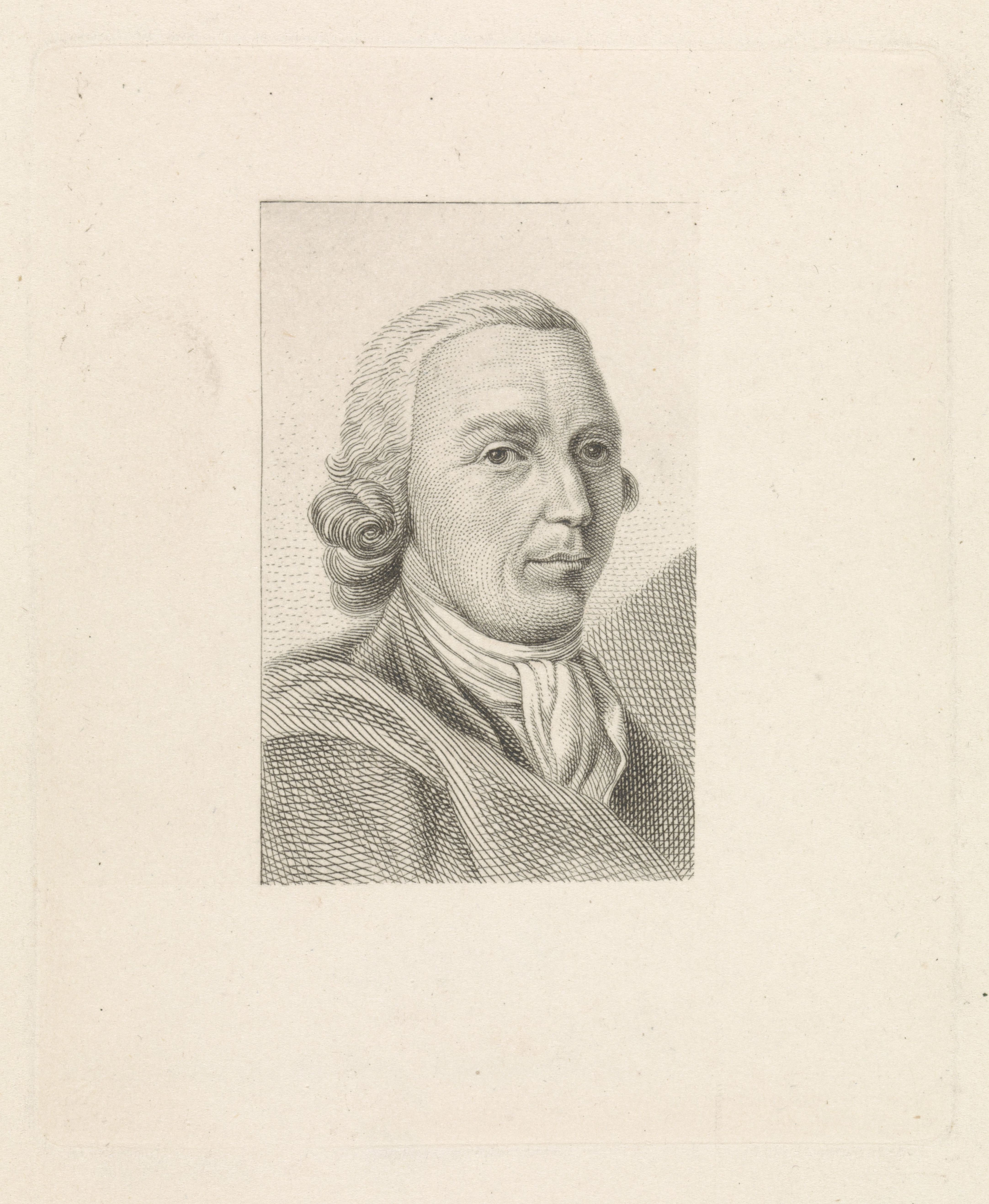
- Portrait of Pieter Barbiers
- Born: Amsterdam
- Died: 7 September 1780; Amsterdam
- Occupation: Painter

Pieter Antonszoon (abbr. Antonsz.) Barbiers (bapt. 23 April 1717 – 7 September 1780) was a Dutch artist. He is also referred to as Pieter Barbiers I, to distinguish him from his descendants with the same name.

== Biography ==
He was born and died in Amsterdam. He painted scenery for theatres in Amsterdam, Leiden, and other cities. Another picture representing the conflagration of the former in the year 1772 has been engraved by C. Bagerts.

His sons Bartholomeus Barbiers and Pieter Pietersz Barbiers were also painters.
