= Franciscus Maelson =

Franciscus Maelson (born Frans Pieterszoon Maekschoon) François Maelson
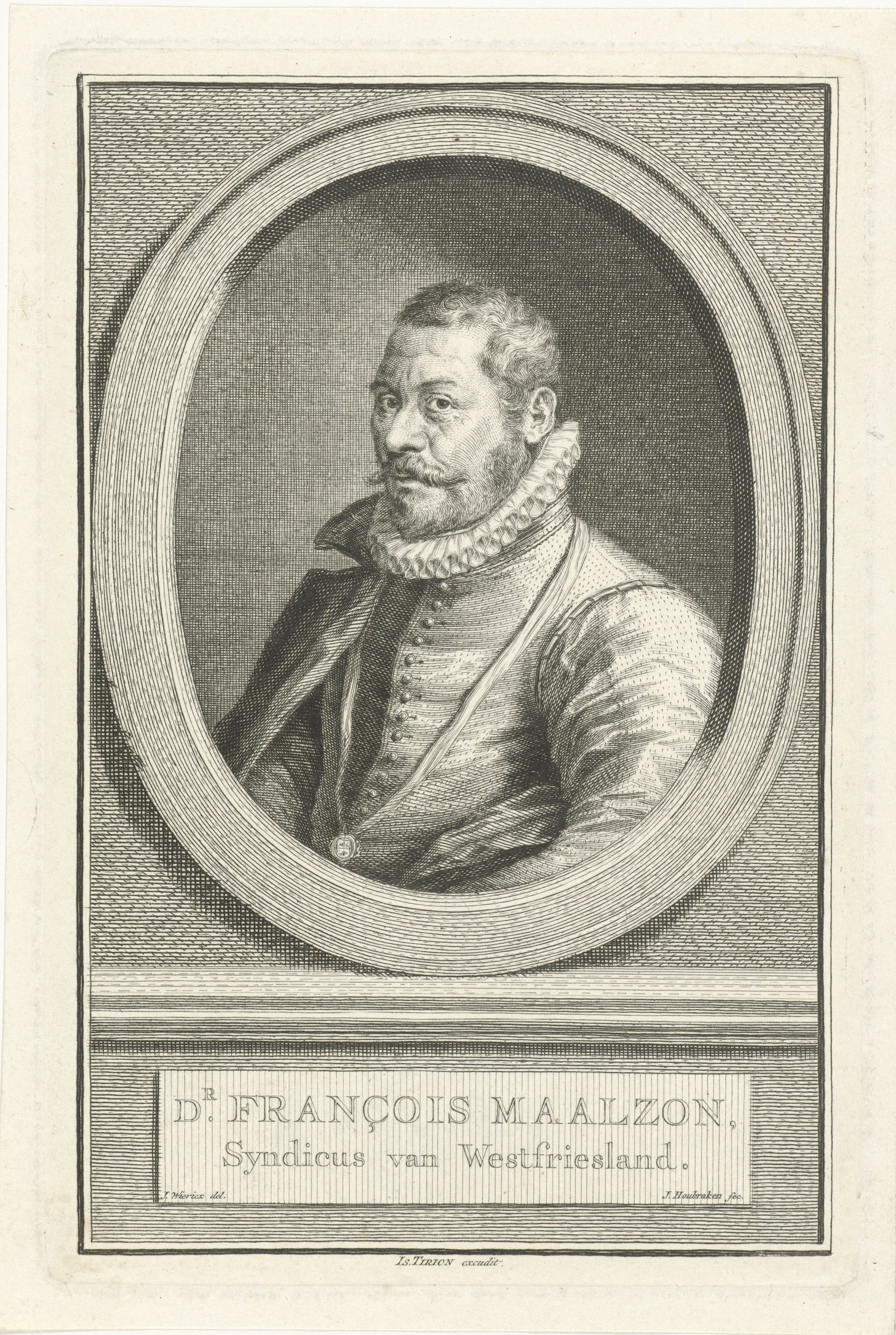
- François Maelson (by Jacob Houbraken)
- Born: 1538; Enkhuizen, Noorderkwartier
- Died: ca 1601
- Occupations: Physician; Statesman; Supporter and funder of pioneering cartography and exploration

Franciscus Maelson (1538–1601), originally from Enkhuizen in what was then West Friesland, was a Dutch physician, statesman and member of the States of Holland (representative assembly).

Some sources identify him as François Maelson. His father's name was Pieter Maekschoon, which under the naming conventions of the time and place would have made his own name Frans Pieterszoon Maekschoon, but he shortened the family name to Maelson (variously spelled in sources).

== Life ==
Maelson studied medicine and in 1563 was appointed Enkhuizen's first city medical officer, for an annual salary of 42 Gulden. He entered into the service of the state in 1572. He was appointed city doctor in The Hague in 1579.

However, his notability derives more from his political activity than from his work as a physician: he played a leading role in the independence struggle of West Friesland, following the outbreak of the Dutch resurgence in 1572. He was a strong partisan of the Orange cause.

Since the opening up of the Zuiderzee in the eleventh city, the area West Friesland (roughly the northern part of modern day North Holland) had become isolated from the rest of the Netherlands economically and politically, and its political isolation was increased after Haarlem fell to the Spanish in 1573. Interested outsiders, notably the English, saw political opportunities to weaken the authority north of Haarlem of the States General in The Hague, by encouraging separatism in West Friesland, especially following the assassination of William of Orange in 1583. Maelson's unwavering support for the Orange cause was an important element in keeping the fighters for Dutch independence united.

As the 1570s progressed Maelson became a "Pensionary" representing Enkhuizen at the Provincial States (assembly), a member of the Delegated Council of West Friesland and of the Council of the Prince of Orange. He was sent on a diplomatic mission to Queen Elizabeth of England in 1575 and again in 1585. In 1596 he was sent on a diplomatic mission to the nineteen year old King Christian of Denmark. Maelson became very knowledgeable on sea-transport and navigation, and provided financial support to the Enkhuizen cartographer Lucas Janszoon Waghenaer (1533 - ca.1606), which enabled the latter to produce two ground breaking books of descriptively annotated sea charts. In 1594 Maelson was an important co-funder of the first expedition to try to find a "northern" sea-route to the East Indies. English attempts to find such a route earlier in the sixteenth century had already led to the discovery, in 1553, of Novaya Zemlya.
