= Pieter Symonsz Potter =

Dutch Golden Age painter (1597–1652)

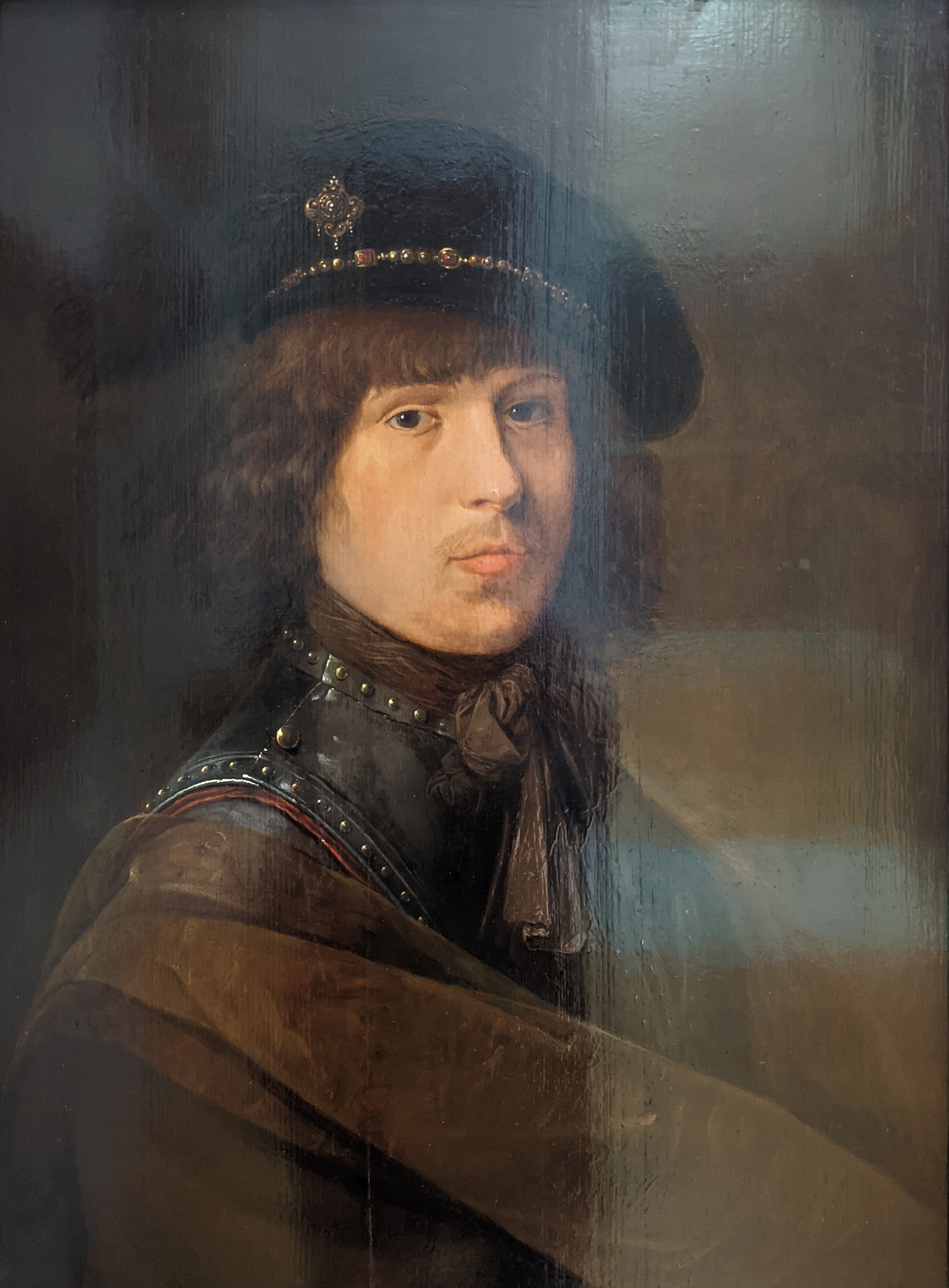
Self-portrait

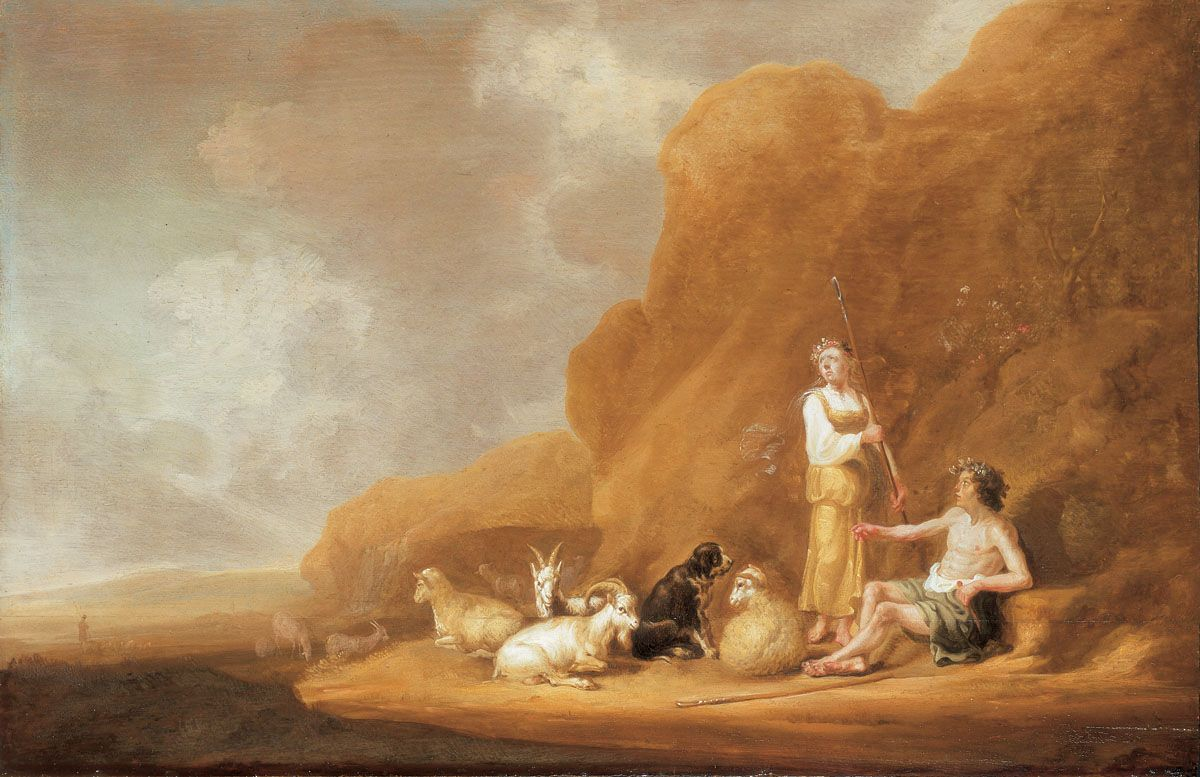
Shepherds

Pieter Symonsz Potter (1597 in Enkhuizen – 1652 in Amsterdam), was a Dutch Golden Age painter.

== Biography ==
According to Houbraken he was the city secretary of Enkhuizen, he was married to the daughter of Paulus Bertius and the father of the painter Pieter I Potter, making him the grandfather of Pieter II, Paulus, and Maria Potter.

According to the RKD his wife was the sister of the painter Willem Bartsius, and he was the father, not the grandfather, of Pieter II, Paulus and Maria. He was first trained as a glass painter and in 1628 moved to Leiden to learn painting in oils. He is known mostly for genre pieces, farm landscapes and still lifes, and he became a member of the Delft Guild of St. Luke in 1646, and a member of the Confrerie Pictura in 1647 (although this record in The Hague guild archives may have been for drawing lessons for his oldest son Peter).
