= Enkhuizen =

- City and municipality
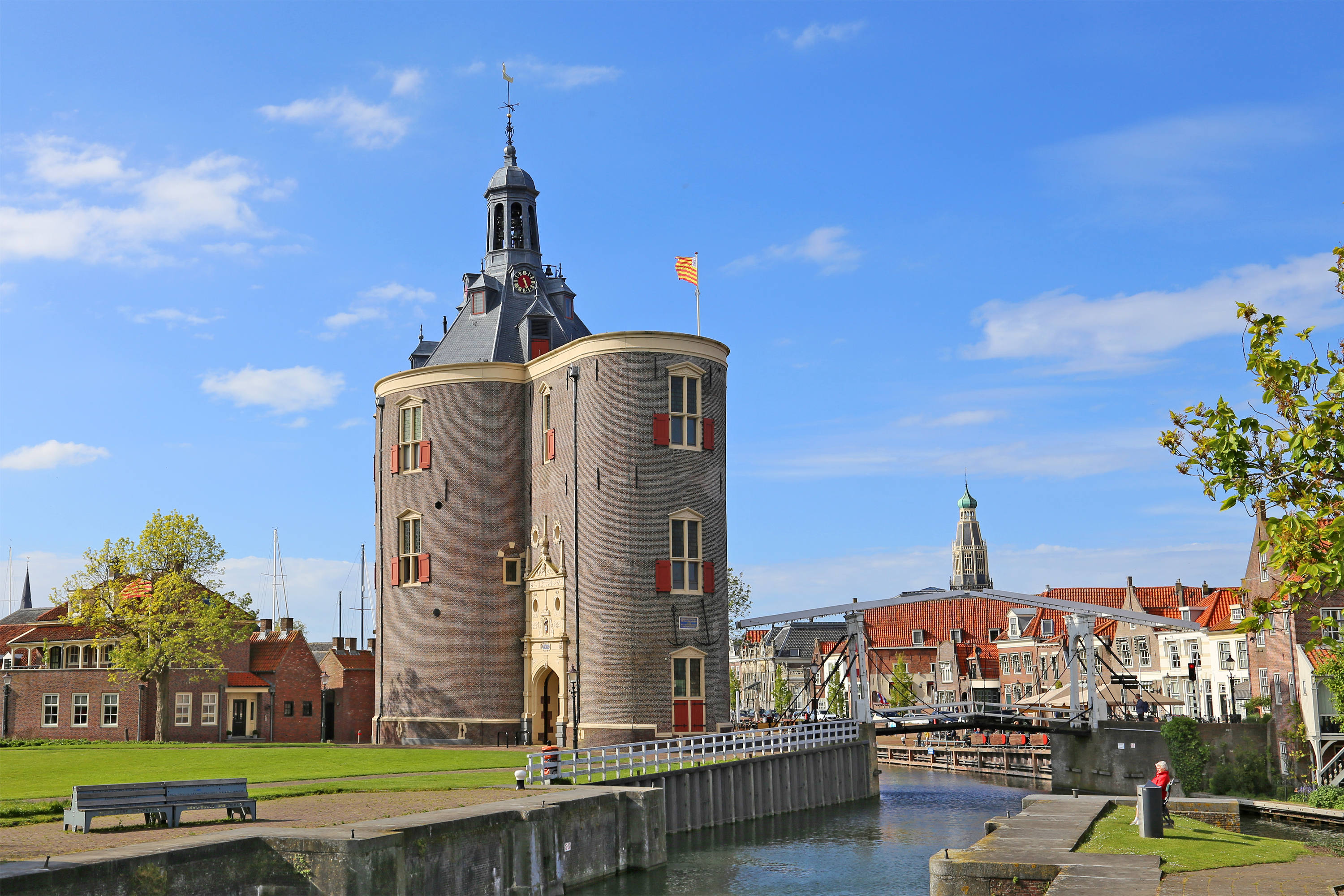
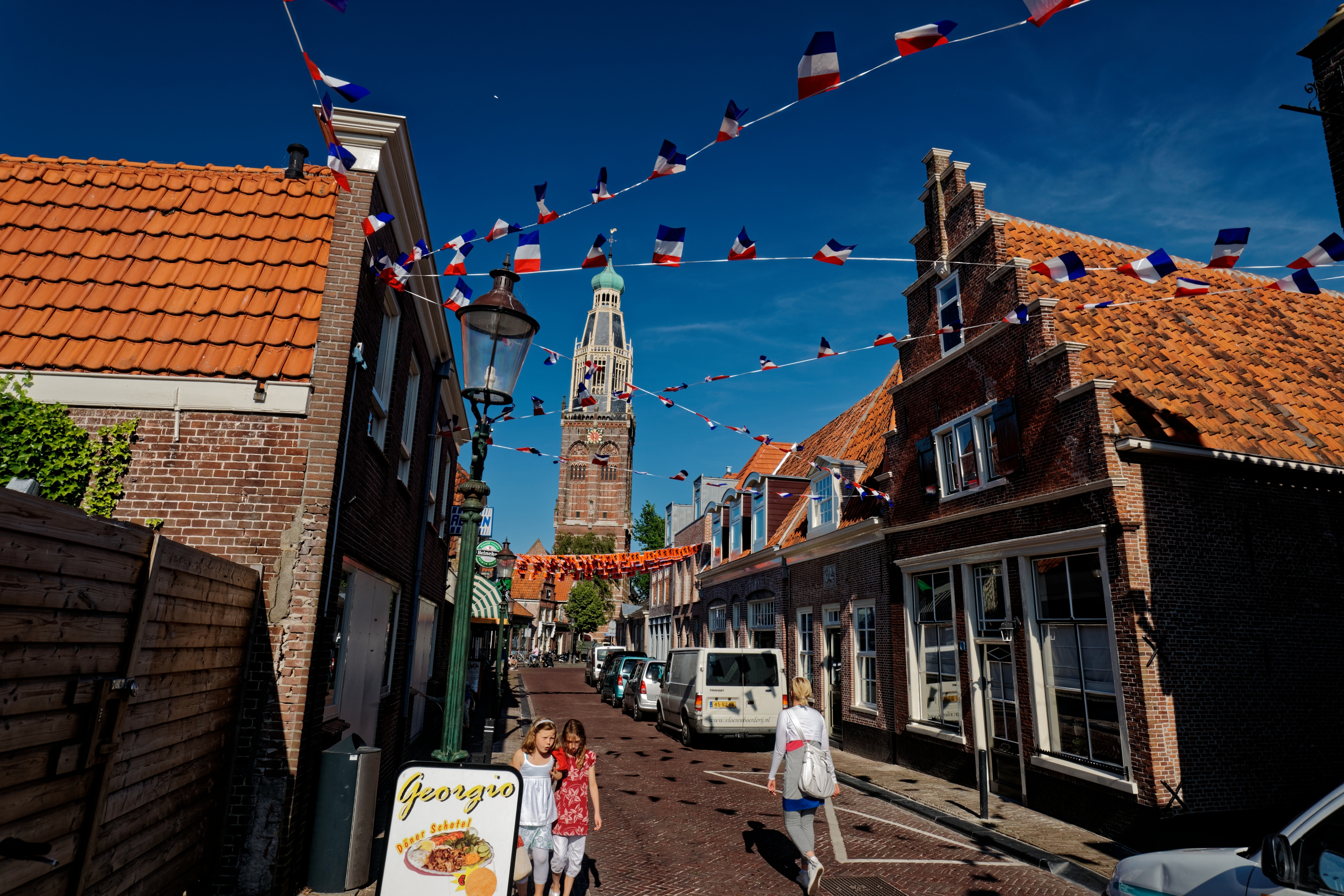
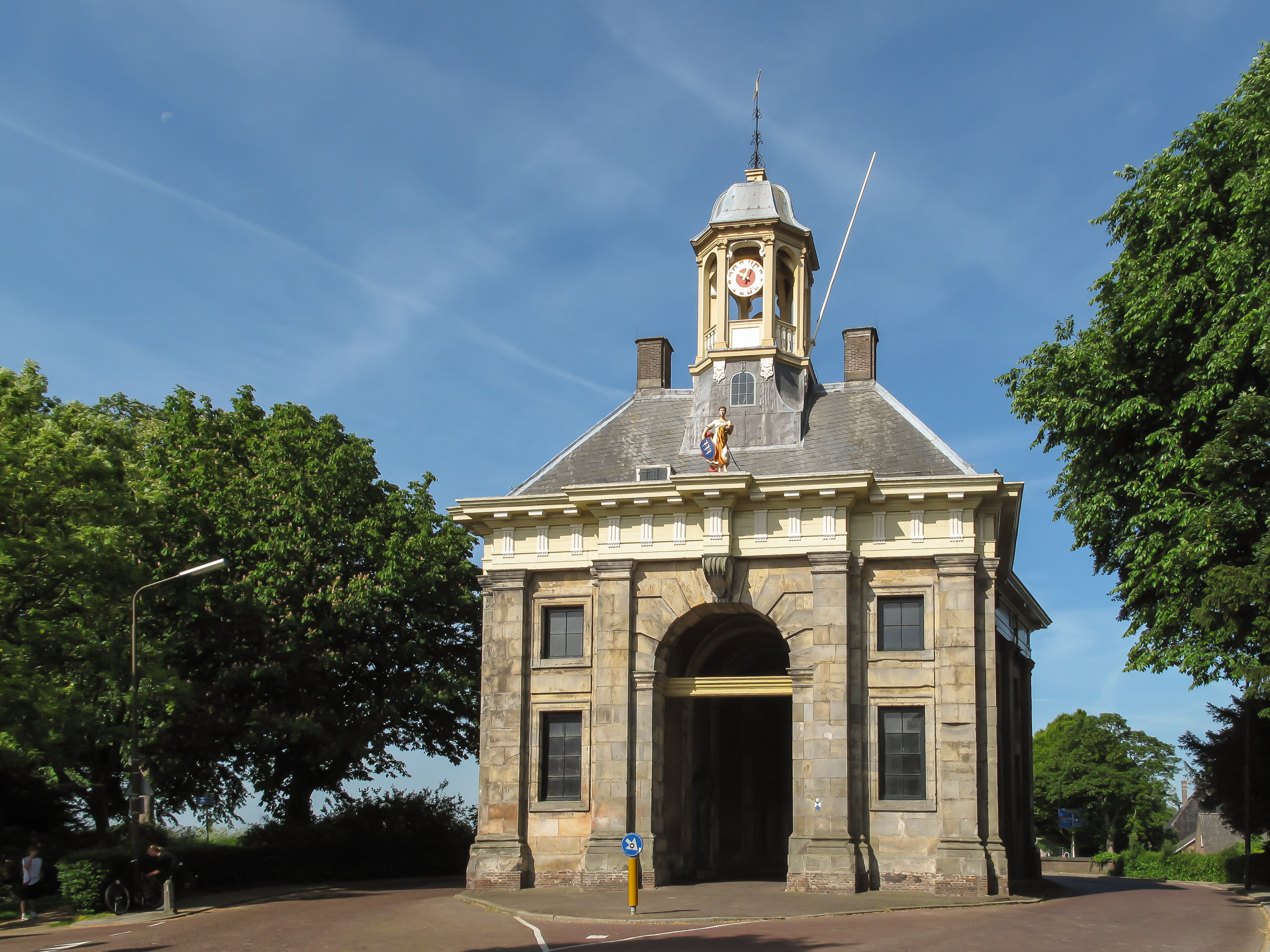
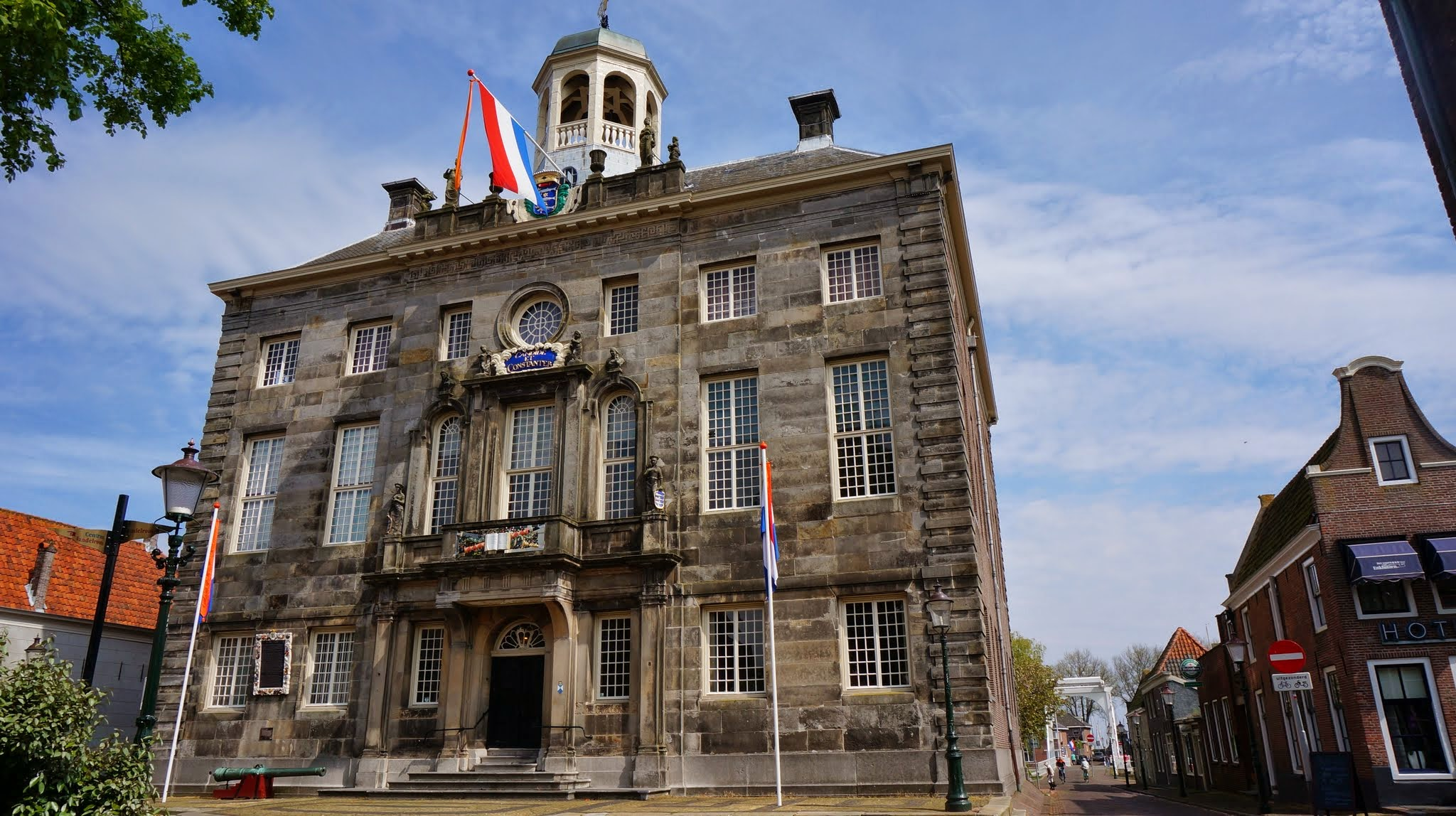
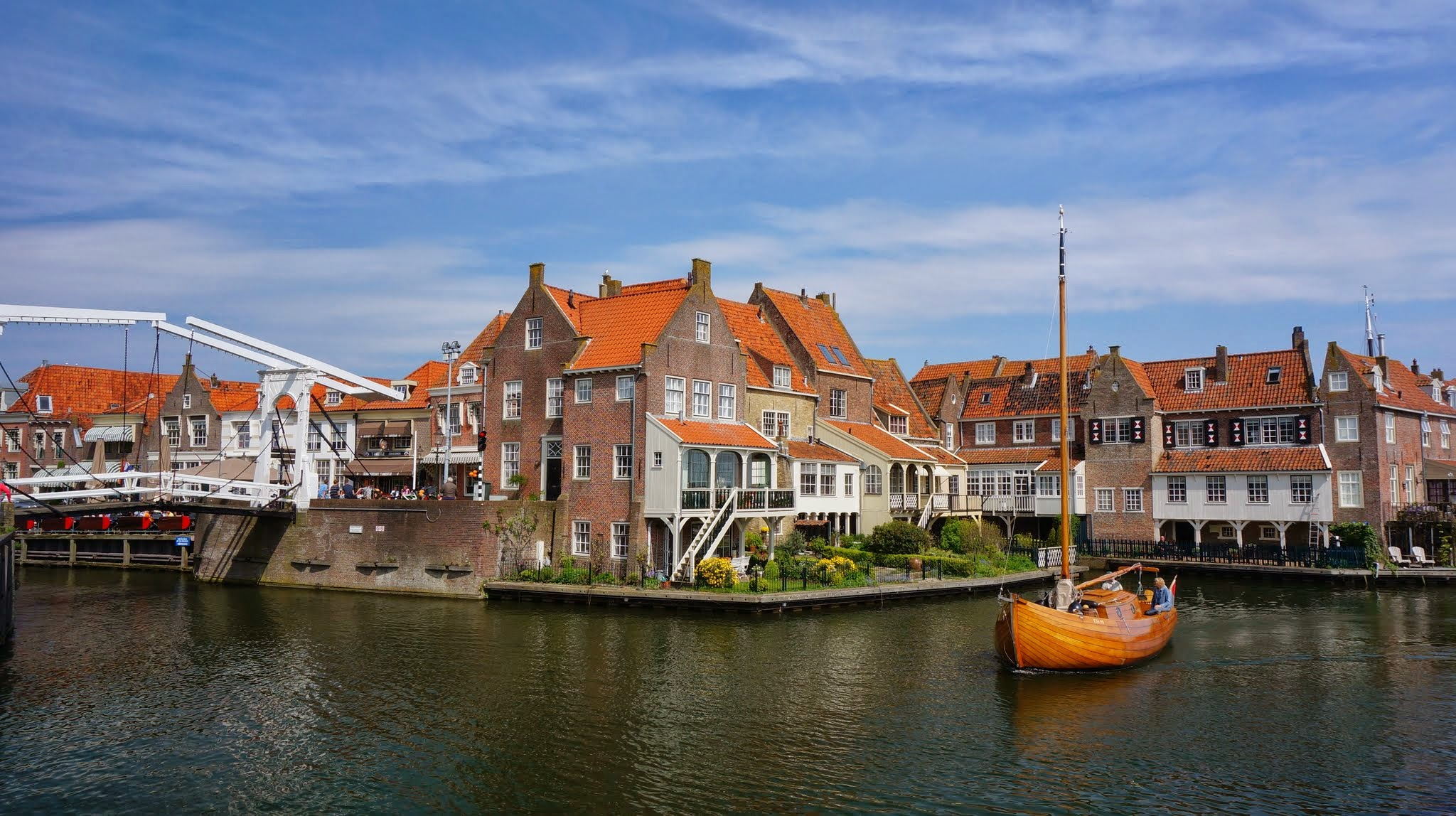
- Drommedaris Torenstraat Koepoort Former town hall Harbourfront

- Flag Coat of arms
- Nickname: Haringstad
- Motto(s): Candide et constanter (Candidly and constantly)
- Location in North Holland

- Location within the Netherlands Location within Europe
- Coordinates: 52°42′N 5°18′E
- Country: Netherlands
- Province: North Holland
- Subregion: West Friesland

Government
  - Body: Municipal council
  - Mayor: Jeltje Hoekstra-Sikkema (VVD)

Area
  - Total: 116.25 km^{2} (44.88 sq mi)
  - Land: 12.68 km^{2} (4.90 sq mi)
  - Water: 103.57 km^{2} (39.99 sq mi)
- Elevation: 3 m (9.8 ft)

Population (2025)
  - Total: 18,847
  - Density: 1,486/km^{2} (3,850/sq mi)
- Demonym: Enkhuizer
- Time zone: UTC+1 (CET)
  - Summer (DST): UTC+2 (CEST)
- Postcode: 1600–1602
- Area code: 0228
- Website: www.enkhuizen.nl

Enkhuizen (Dutch pronunciation: [ɛŋkˈɦœyzə(n)]) is a historic city and municipality in the Netherlands. Located in the region of West Friesland in the province of North Holland, the city developed as an important fishing and trading port during the Middle Ages and the Dutch Golden Age, when it was one of the wealthiest and most influential cities in the country.

Today, the town is known for its well-preserved historic centre, maritime heritage, and cultural attractions. Enkhuizen remains an active regional hub with a population of approximately 18,843 inhabitants in 2025.

== Etymology ==
The name Enkhuizen appears in historical records as early as 1283, when it was written as Enkus(e) in a document about the robbery of English merchants. Over time, it was recorded in various forms, including Enchusen in 1311 and Enghusen in 1334.

Several theories have been proposed to explain the origin of the name. One interpretation suggests that it derives from enk or eng, old words for a piece of farmland, usually a high-lying arable field known in other parts of the Netherlands as an es or enk. In this view, Enkhuizen would mean "the houses near the fields." However, this interpretation is subject to doubt, as the term enk is not attested as common regional vocabulary in West Friesland.

Another possibility is that the name refers to a Frisian personal name, Enke or Henke, meaning "the houses belonging to Enke". A more recent theory proposes a social origin, suggesting that an enke could have been a free farm labourer living in small groups of cottages separate from a central farmstead.

While no single interpretation can be confirmed with certainty, these hypotheses reflect the settlement's agricultural character and its early medieval roots.

== History ==
Enkhuizen, like Hoorn and Amsterdam, was one of the harbour-towns of the VOC, from where overseas trade with the East Indies was conducted. It received city rights in 1356. On 24 June 1572 during the Eighty Years' War, in Enkhuizen five Franciscans from Alkmaar were hanged: known as the martyrs of Alkmaar.

In the mid-17th century, Enkhuizen was at the peak of its power and was one of the most important harbour cities in the Netherlands. However, due to various reasons, notably the silting up of the harbours, Enkhuizen lost its position to Amsterdam.

== Geography ==
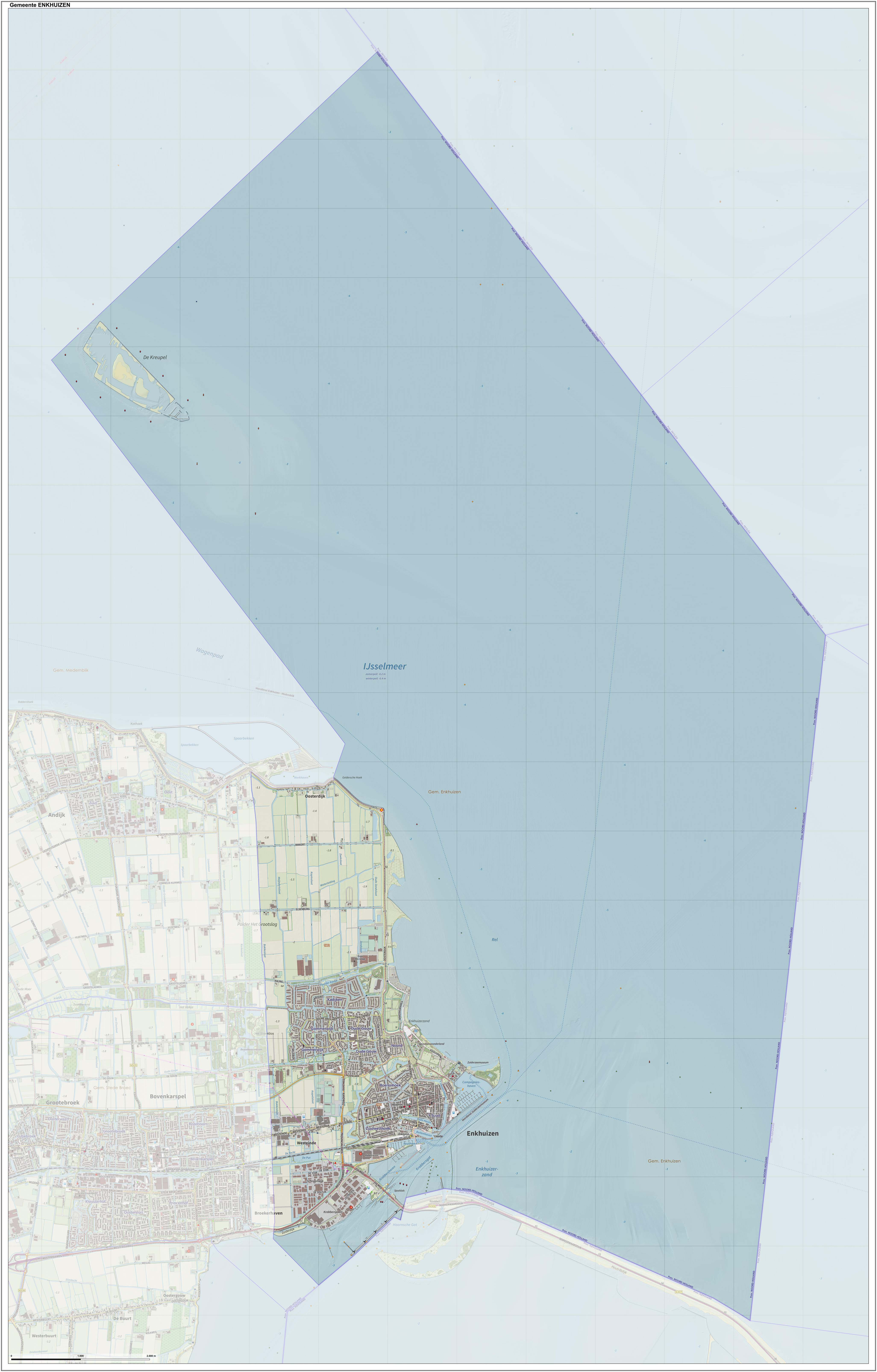
Map of Enkhuizen, June 2015

Enkhuizen is located in the eastern part of the North Holland peninsula, along the northern shore of the Markermeer and near the IJsselmeer. The town forms part of the historical region of West Friesland, which is characterised by low-lying polder landscapes reclaimed from the sea. Apart from the elevated dykes and the historical fortifications, most of the area lies at or below sea level. These dykes protect the built-up area and the surrounding agricultural land from flooding.

The town is intersected by canals and harbours that historically facilitated fishing, trade, and transport. The fertile reclaimed soils around Enkhuizen support horticulture and agriculture, including flower bulb cultivation. To the west, the Streekbos recreational area provides functions as a green buffer between Enkhuizen and neighbouring settlements.

=== Climate ===
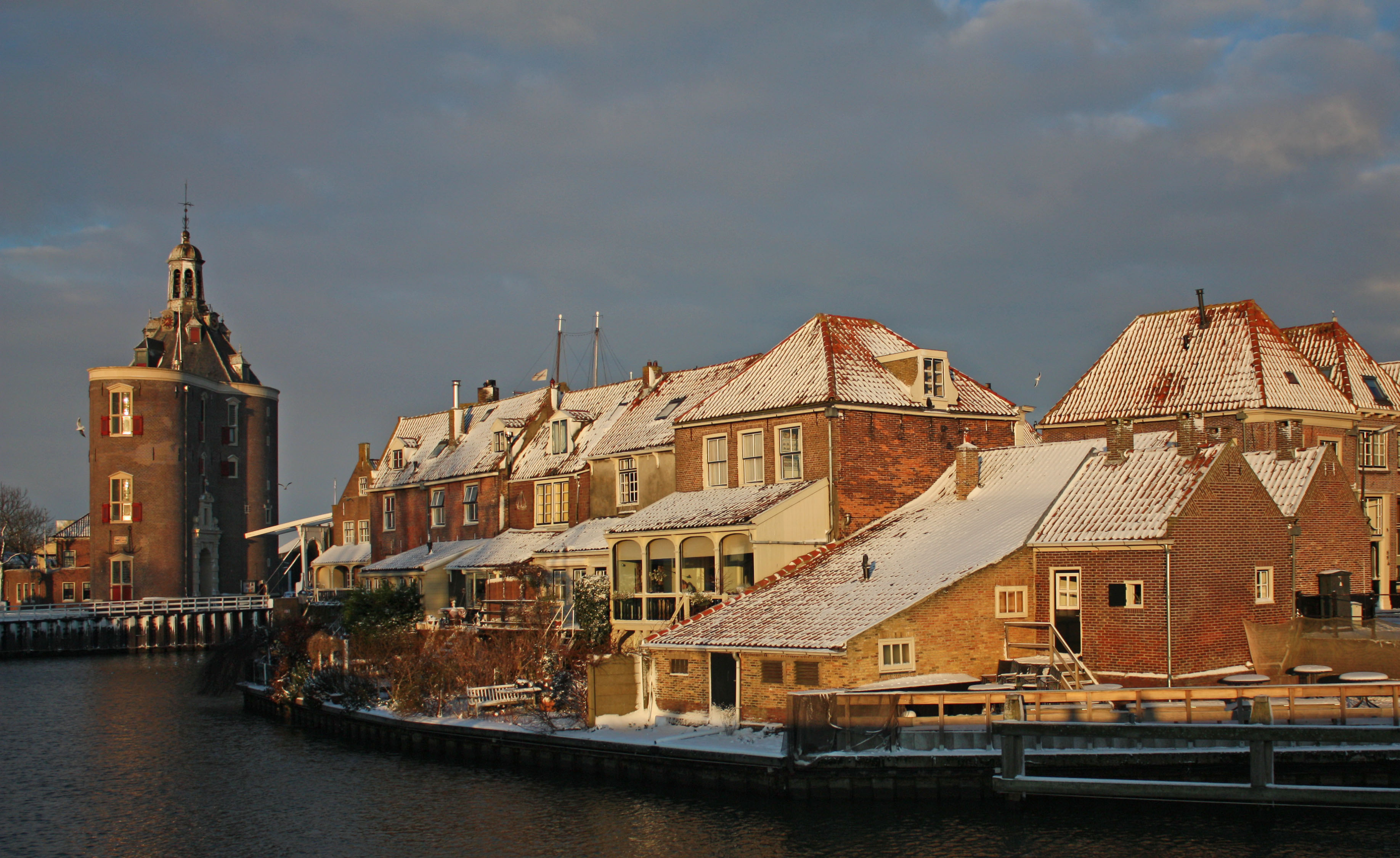
Snowfall in Enkhuizen

Enkhuizen has a temperate oceanic climate (Köppen: Cfb), influenced by its proximity to the North Sea and the surrounding inland lakes. Summers are mild to warm, with average high temperatures between June and August of about 20–22 °C. Periods of very warm weather, exceeding 30 °C, are infrequent. Winters are generally mild, with average daytime temperatures in January around 6 °C. Nighttime frosts occur occasionally, particularly during easterly winds from the continent, but the large water bodies help to moderate temperature extremes.

Precipitation is spread fairly evenly throughout the year, with annual totals typically between 800 and 900 millimetres. The late summer and autumn months tend to be the wettest, while winter is somewhat drier. Wind conditions are also influenced by the open exposure to the Markermeer and IJsselmeer, with frequent westerly winds and stronger gusts common during autumn and winter storms.

== Demography ==
Historical population
Year	Pop.	±% p.a.
1398	1,900	—
1477	3,500	+0.78%
1494	3,175	−0.57%
1514	3,600	+0.63%
1553	4,450	+0.54%
1557	5,500	+5.44%
1561	7,750	+8.95%
1622	21,878	+1.72%
1632	19,150	−1.32%
1732	10,420	−0.61%
1795	6,803	−0.67%
Source: Lourens & Lucassen 1997, pp. 59–60

As of 1 January 2025, the municipality of Enkhuizen has 18,843 residents, a steady increase from 16,124 in 1995 (17% rise over 30 years), with an average annual growth of 0.5%. The city comprises 8,884 households, averaging 2.1 persons per household, and has approximately 10,852 addresses in total. The population distribution is relatively even across age groups, with the largest cohort (27%) aged between 45 and 65. The population density is approximately 1,389 addresses per square kilometre, reflecting a compact urban setting.

In 2023, the birth rate was about 9 per 1,000 inhabitants and the death rate around 11 per 1.000, characteristic of an aging population. Migration data indicate modest levels of in- and out-migration, resulting in a small net migration gain. Regarding migration background, around 10–12% of residents in certain districts have a non-native or non-Western background, indicating some diversity, though the municipality remains predominantly native Dutch (2023: 80%).

== Economy ==
=== Tourism ===
Enkhuizen attracts visitors with its historic architecture, maritime heritage, and museums. The centre includes numerous listed buildings, canals, and landmarks such as the Drommedaris tower.

Museums, such as the Zuiderzee Museum, display exhibitions about regional history and attract cultural tourism. Other attractions include Sprookjeswonderland, a theme park with playgrounds and a petting zoo. The Enkhuizer Zand and Streekbos areas offer beaches, green spaces, and facilities for walking and cycling.

The city has one of the largest marinas in the Netherlands, supporting sailing, recreational boating, and seasonal ferry services to Medemblik. Throughout the year, Enkhuizen hosts markets, maritime festivals, and other public events that attract visitors.

=== Retail ===
Retail in Enkhuizen is concentrated primarily along Westerstraat, a historic street lined with a mix of independent boutiques, specialty shops, and larger chain retailers. Here, a weekly market is held every Wednesday.

=== Industry ===
Enkhuizen has a diverse industrial base that includes seed breeding, food production, and maritime services. The town is part of Seed Valley, a regional cluster of companies active in the development and trade of seeds for vegetable and flower cultivation. Major firms include Syngenta, which operates research facilities in Enkhuizen, Enza Zaden, a leading vegetable breeding company, and Bayer Crop Science. The area’s seed sector contributes to exports and employment in the region.

Enkhuizen is also known for the production of Echte Enkhuizer Jodekoeken, a type of butter biscuit first produced locally in the early 20th century. Other economic activities include marina operations, yacht maintenance, and small-scale boatbuilding connected to the town’s location on the IJsselmeer.

== Culture ==
Enkhuizen hosts a variety of annual cultural events. King’s Day is celebrated with markets, music, and public gatherings. The Avondvierdaagse walking event encourages participation from residents of all ages, especially elementary school students. On 11 November, children walk the streets with lanterns, singing traditional songs in celebration of St. Martin’s Day, receiving candy in return. Also in November, the annual Sinterklaas parade marks the traditional arrival of Saint Nicholas. Other events include a light festival in December and guided evening walks through the historic centre in summer.

The Harddraverijdag, held on the third Thursday of September, features harness racing along the streets and a fireworks display. Traditional Carnival celebrations also take place, when the city is known as Haringdonk (named after herring).

Since 1974, the town has organised a jazz festival each May or June, attracting international performers for concerts at multiple venues.

Enkhuizen has two historic Hemony carillons in the Zuiderkerk and the Drommedaris, which sound automatically every quarter-hour and are played in summer concerts by the city carillonneur. Traditional costumes (klederdracht) are sometimes presented at festivals. The Drommedaris also serves as a cultural venue for concerts, film screenings, and exhibitions. Public art is visible throughout the city, including a number of sculptures and monuments.

=== Museums ===
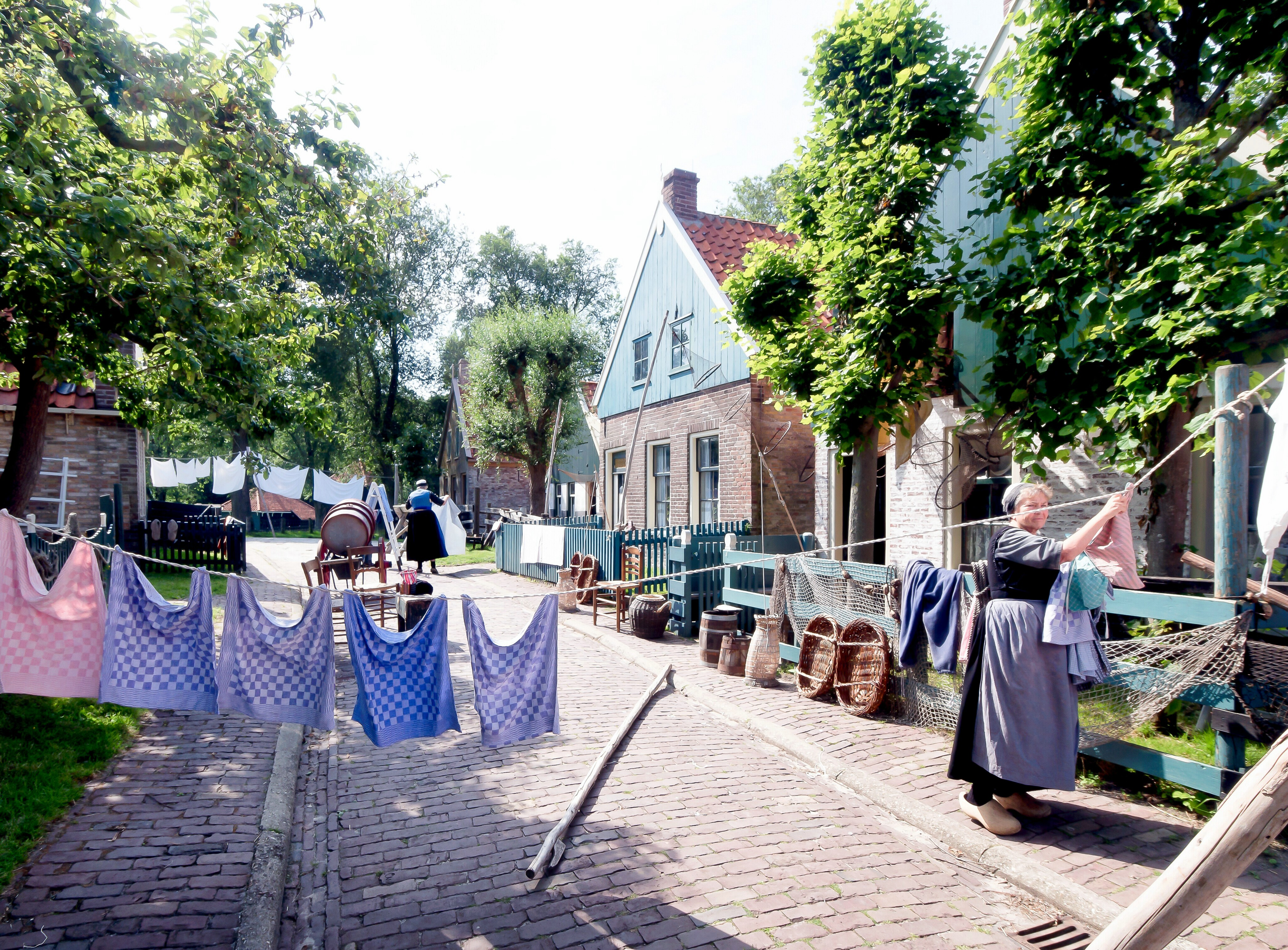
Traditional laundry demonstration at the Zuiderzee Museum

Enkhuizen has several museums that document regional culture and maritime history. The Zuiderzee Museum combines an indoor collection with an open-air museum that includes relocated buildings and demonstrations of traditional crafts. The Flessenscheepjesmuseum specialises in ships in bottles.

Other museums include the Enkhuizer Almanakmuseum, which presents the history of the oldest annual almanac in the Netherlands, and the Heiligenbeeldenmuseum, focused on religious statuary.

== Architecture and landmarks ==
Enkhuizen has a well-preserved historic city centre that illustrates its development as a prosperous port during the Dutch Golden Age. The city’s architectural heritage includes over 360 national heritage sites (rijksmonumenten), historic churches, defensive structures, and traditional merchant houses.

=== Civic and commercial buildings ===
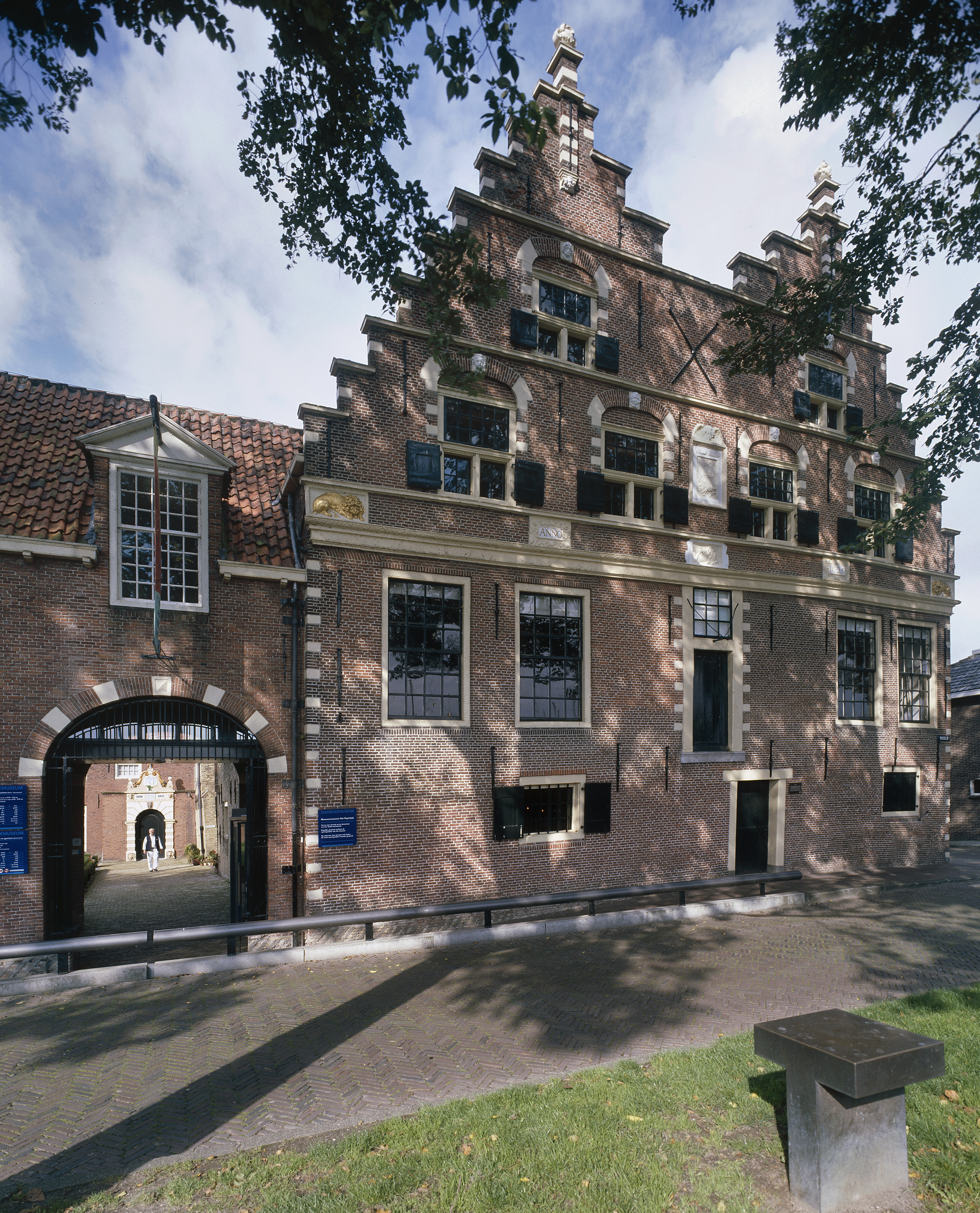
Peperhuis

The Peperhuis is a 17th-century warehouse originally used by the Dutch East India Company (VOC) for storing spices. It later served as a depot for trade in goods from Asia and other overseas regions. Today, the Peperhuis is part of the Zuiderzee Museum and hosts exhibitions about maritime commerce and everyday life in the former Zuiderzee region. The Peperhuis was also used as the model for a KLM Delft Blue house.

The Waag (weigh house), built in 1559 in Renaissance style, was used to weigh and register goods brought into the town during the 16th and 17th centuries.

The old town hall, dating from the 17th century, and features a classicist façade with pilasters and decorative stonework. It housed the municipal administration and the council chamber until these were relocated.

The Snouck van Loosenhuis, an 18th-century stately residence, belonged to the Snouck van Loosen family. The building is notable for its classical architecture and later use as charitable housing.

=== Fortifications ===
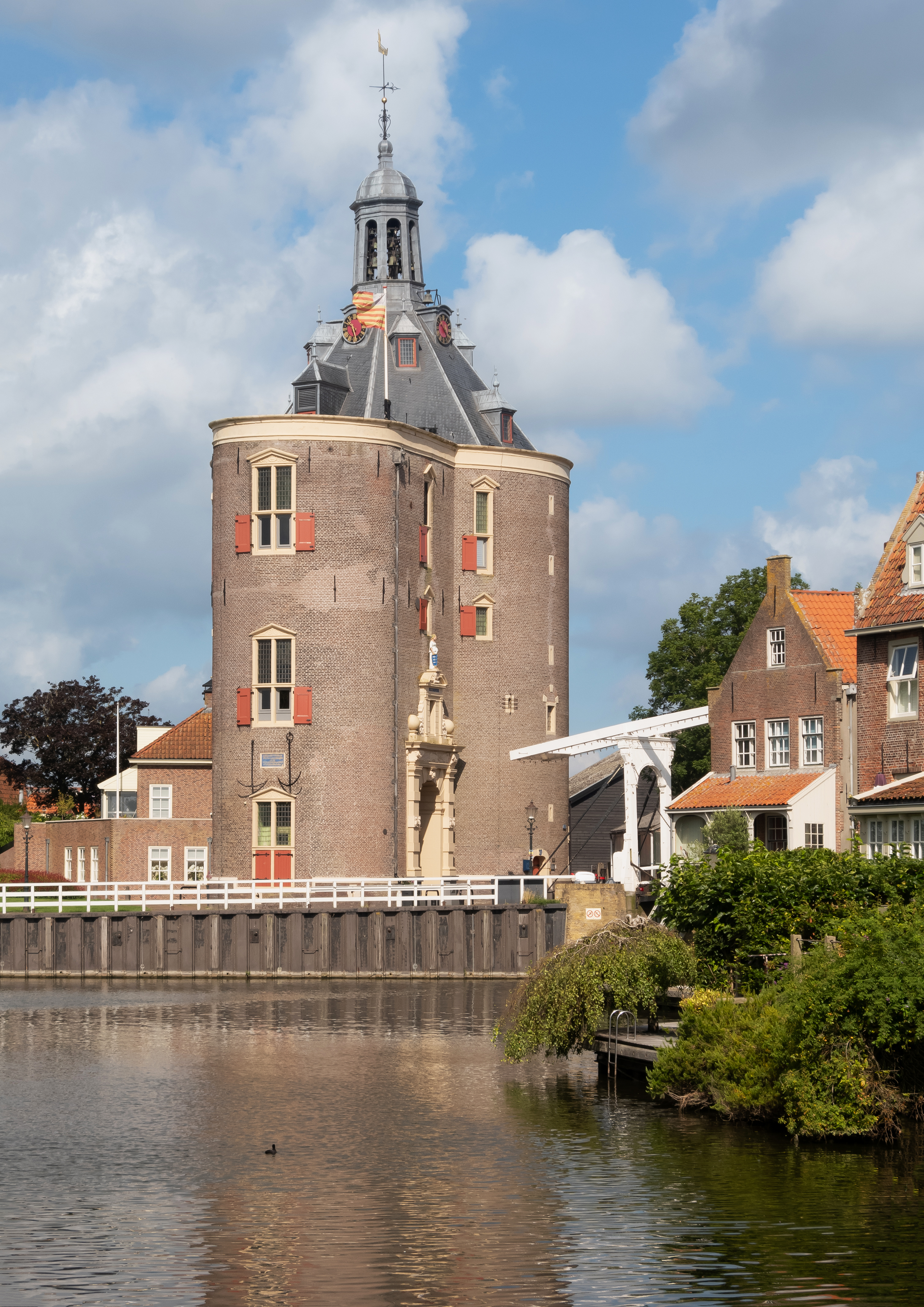
The Drommedaris, landmark tower and former city gate

Enkhuizen’s fortifications were developed between the 16th and 17th centuries to protect the town against military threats and flooding. One of the most recognisable landmarks is the Drommedaris, a defensive tower constructed in 1540 to guard the entrance to the harbour. It was later modified with the addition of a clock tower and a carillon in the 17th century. Today, the building functions as a cultural centre hosting concerts and exhibitions.

Among the preserved town gates is the Koepoort, completed in 1649 as the western entrance to Enkhuizen. Built in a classicist style with pilasters and decorative stonework, it served both defensive and ceremonial purposes.

The zeemuur, or seawall, forms part of the coastal defences constructed to protect against high water levels and storm surges. Sections of this wall remain visible along the harbour front.

Two historic water gates regulated access to the canals and harbour basins. The Boerenboom was used as a water gate and lock and retains its characteristic wooden doors. The Oude Gouwsboom served a similar function.

Canals, bastions, and harbour basins remain prominent features of the city's historic urban landscape.

=== Historic houses ===
Enkhuizen retains many 16th- and 17th-century merchant houses and warehouses that reflect its prosperity during the Dutch Golden Age. These buildings are notable for stepped and bell-shaped gables, ornamental brickwork, and large wooden doors used for storing and transporting goods.

One of the most recognisable streetscapes is along Bocht, a curved street bordering the harbour basin. Here, facades display decorative details that illustrate the wealth of merchants involved in Zuiderzee trade.

=== Churches ===
Enkhuizen contains several historic churches dating from the late medieval and early modern periods. The Westerkerk, constructed between approximately 1470 and 1540, is a large late Gothic hall church with a richly decorated interior and a wooden barrel vault that spans the nave. The Zuiderkerk, dating from the 15th and 16th centuries, combines Gothic structural elements with later additions and renovations. Smaller historic churches and chapels are located throughout the city centre, including the Evangelical Lutheran Church and St Francis Xavier Church.

== Sports ==
Enkhuizen offers a range of sports and recreational activities supported by local clubs and public facilities. The city's location on the IJsselmeer enables water-based activities, including recreational boating and sailing from the marinas. The shallow waters near the Enkhuizer Zand recreational area are used for kitesurfing, and equipment for sailing and kayaking is available through local providers. Indoor and outdoor swimming facilities are located at the Recreatiebad Enkhuizer Zand, serving leisure swimmers and families. Football is organised through Sportvereniging Enkhuizen (s.v. Enkhuizen), an amateur club established on 1 May 2021 following the merger of v.v. DINDUA and VV West Frisia. The club fields teams in regional competitions and maintains youth programmes. Other sports include tennis and padel, organised by the Enkhuizer Tennis Club, as well as indoor football and general fitness activities at various gyms and sports centres. Until recently, Enkhuizen was also home to WFHC Enkhuizen, an amateur field hockey club that has since ceased operations.

== Politics ==
Following the 2026 local election, the 17 seats of Enkhuizen municipal council divided as:

- CDA – 3 seats
- Enkhuizen Forward! – 2 seats
- SP – 2 seats
- Enkhuizer Alternative – 2 seats
- GreenLeft / PvdA – 2 seats
- VVD – 2 seats
- D66 – 2 seats
- SGP – 1 seat
- Pirate Party – 1 seat

== Transport ==
Enkhuizen is compact and easily navigable on foot or by bicycle, with routes available through the historic centre and former city walls. The town is accessible by road, with connections across the IJsselmeer via the Houtribdijk to Lelystad.

=== Railway ===
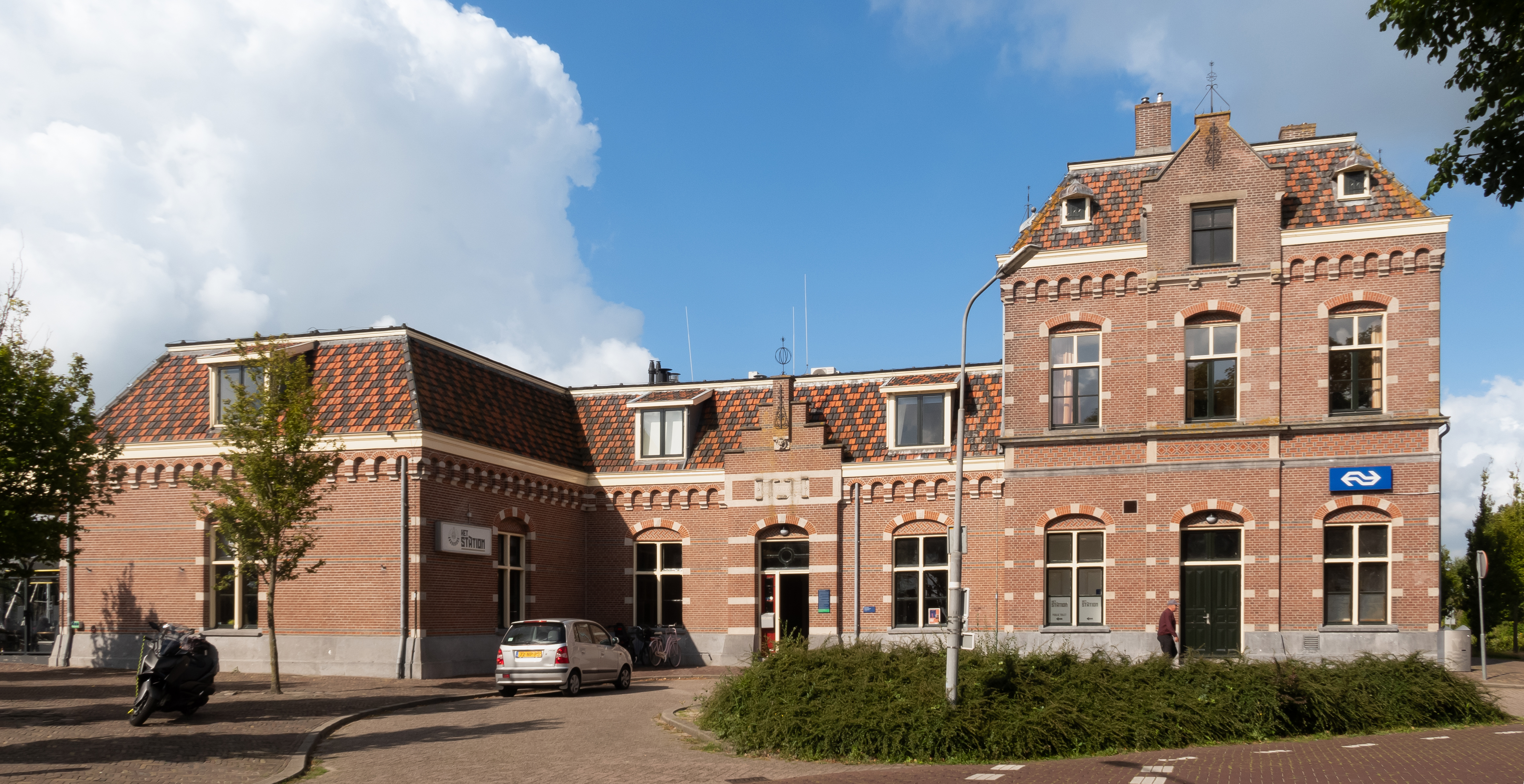
Enkhuizen railway station

Railway passengers arrive and depart at Enkhuizen railway station, the terminus of the Zaandam–Enkhuizen railway line. Regular Intercity services operate to Hoorn, Amsterdam, and onward to Utrecht, Eindhoven, and Heerlen/Maastricht. Trains typically run twice per hour, with the journey to Amsterdam taking around 55–60 minutes.

=== Bus ===
Local bus services connect the station to surrounding towns and are operated by Connexxion.

=== Ferry ===
In the summer, seasonal ferry services operate from Enkhuizen to Stavoren, Medemblik, and Urk aboard motor vessels. Visitors can also travel on the historic ship Friesland (operated by the Hoorn–Medemblik heritage railway) as part of a combined steam tram and ferry route between Hoorn, Medemblik, and Enkhuizen.

== Education ==
Enkhuizen provides primary and secondary education through a number of local institutions. As of 2024, there are six primary school locations in the town, with an average distance to a primary school of approximately 0.6 kilometres. The town has one secondary school, RSG Enkhuizen, which serves around 1,400 students. The school offers general and vocational programmes, as well as international exchange opportunities.

According to demographic data, about 26% of residents between 15 and 75 years have completed higher education, while approximately 44% hold a secondary education diploma. For vocational training and higher education, most students commute to nearby cities such as Hoorn, Alkmaar, or Amsterdam.

== Religion ==
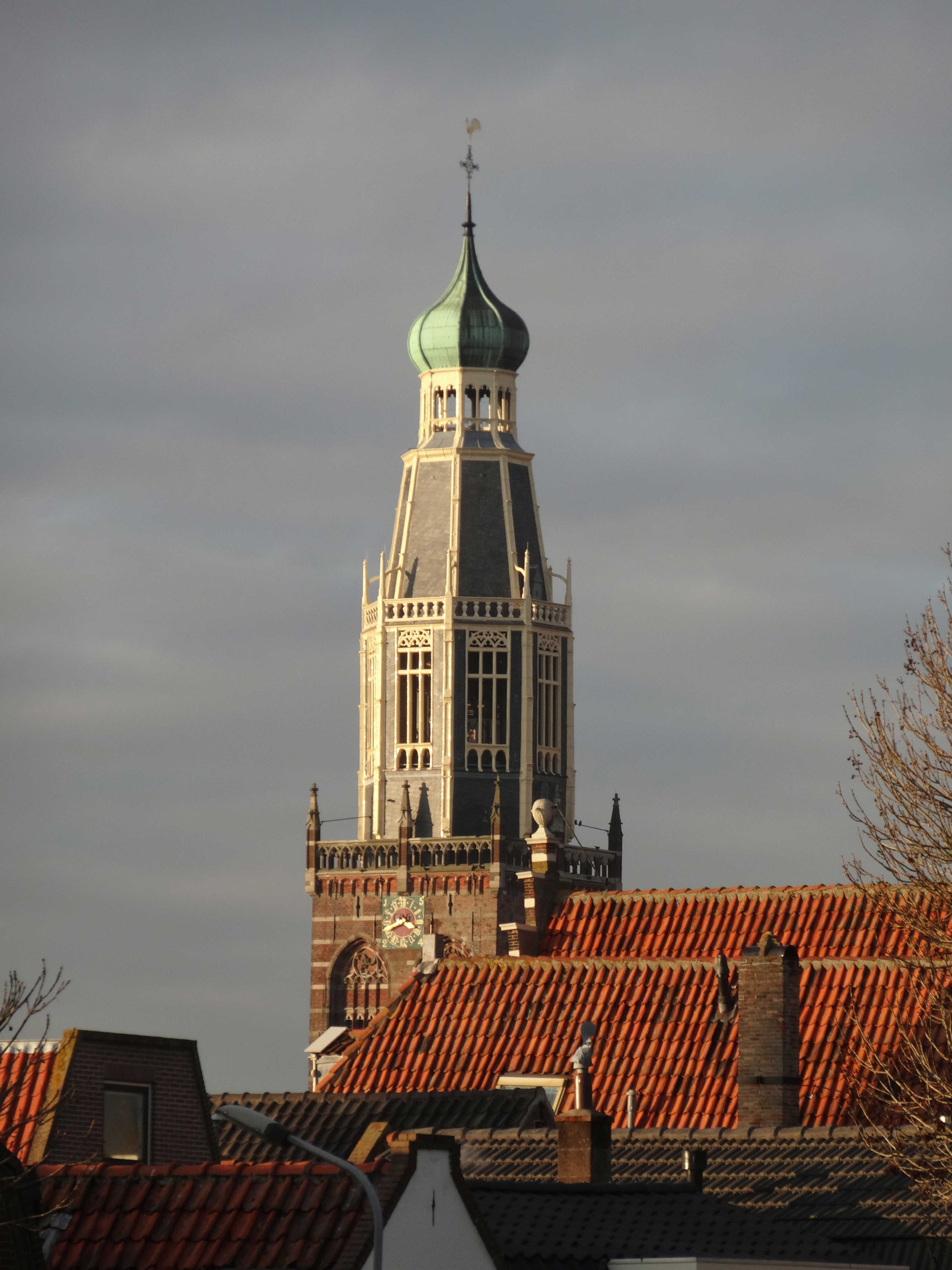
Spire of the Zuiderkerk

Christianity was first introduced in the region during the 8th century by missionaries, supported by Frankish rulers seeking to extend their influence over the Frisian territories. During the Middle Ages, Enkhuizen was under the religious jurisdiction of the Bishopric of Utrecht and influenced by the Egmond Abbey, which played a role in establishing parishes and developing local infrastructure.

Today, Enkhuizen is home to several active Protestant congregations, including the historic Reformed Protestant Church, the Evangelical Lutheran Church, and a Baptist Church, all housed in buildings originally constructed in earlier centuries. The Zuiderkerk and the late-Gothic Westerkerk continue to serve both worship and cultural functions, with regular services, concerts, and community events.

The main Roman Catholic church, the Franciscus Xaveriuskerk, was deconsecrated in 2013 and has stood largely unused since then as parish functions have relocated to a converted former library building. Secondary Catholic communities convene in smaller chapels or shared spaces within the town.

Enkhuizen had a small Jewish community from at least the 18th century, establishing its first synagogue in 1734 and a cemetery in 1738. A larger synagogue was built in 1791 on the Zuider Havendijk. The community reached its largest size around 1795 but declined steadily in the 19th and 20th centuries. During the Second World War, most local Jewish residents survived deportation. The synagogue closed in 1964 and was transferred to the municipality, while the cemetery remains preserved as a historic site.

In 2022, the Alaaddin Mosque opened, providing prayer facilities, educational rooms, and community spaces for Muslims in Enkhuizen.

Demographic trends reflect national patterns: a majority of residents in North Holland identify as non-religious. Nevertheless, religious buildings in Enkhuizen remain integral to the city's cultural identity, heritage, and social activities.

== Notable people ==
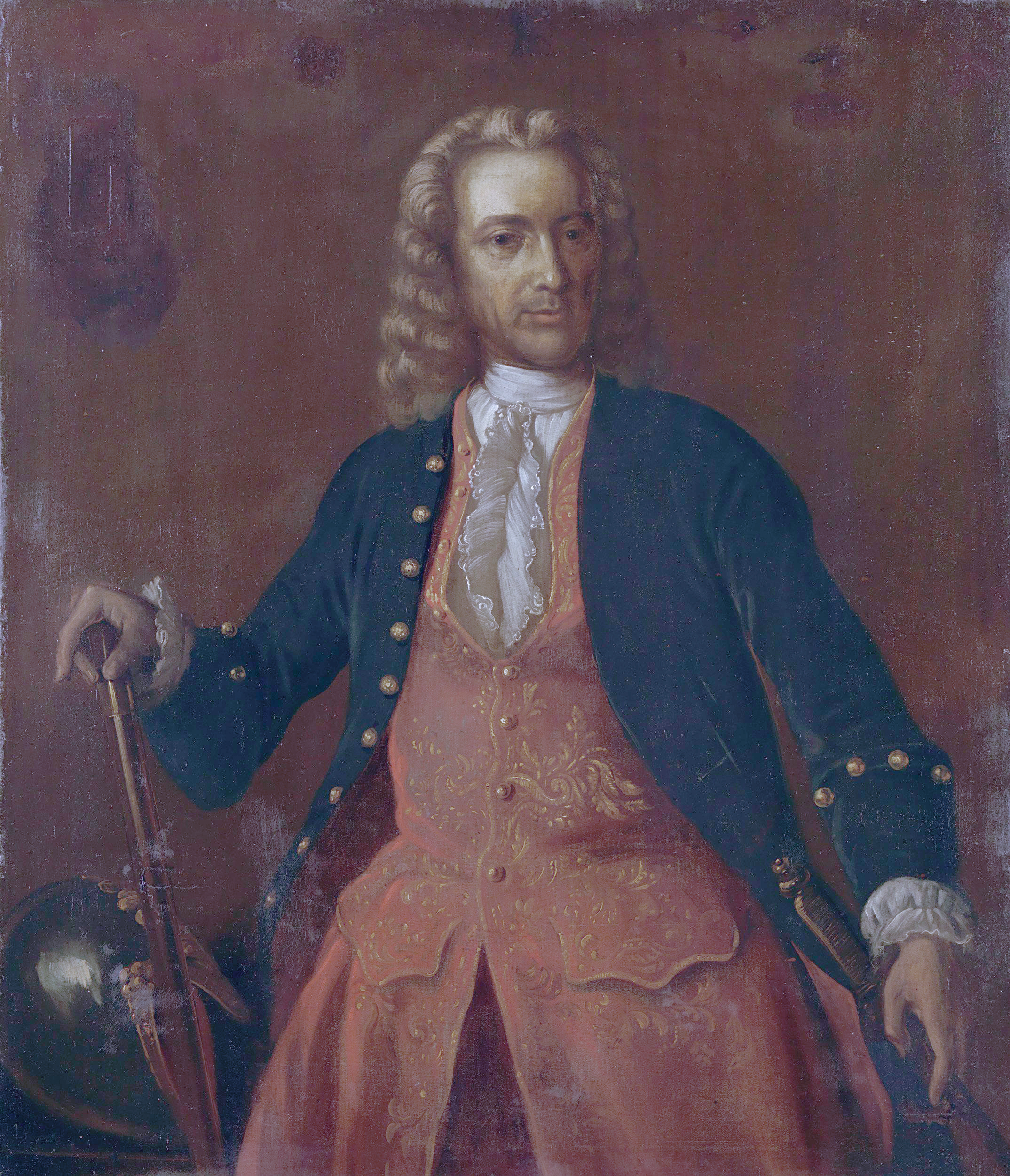
Jacob Mossel, ca.1755

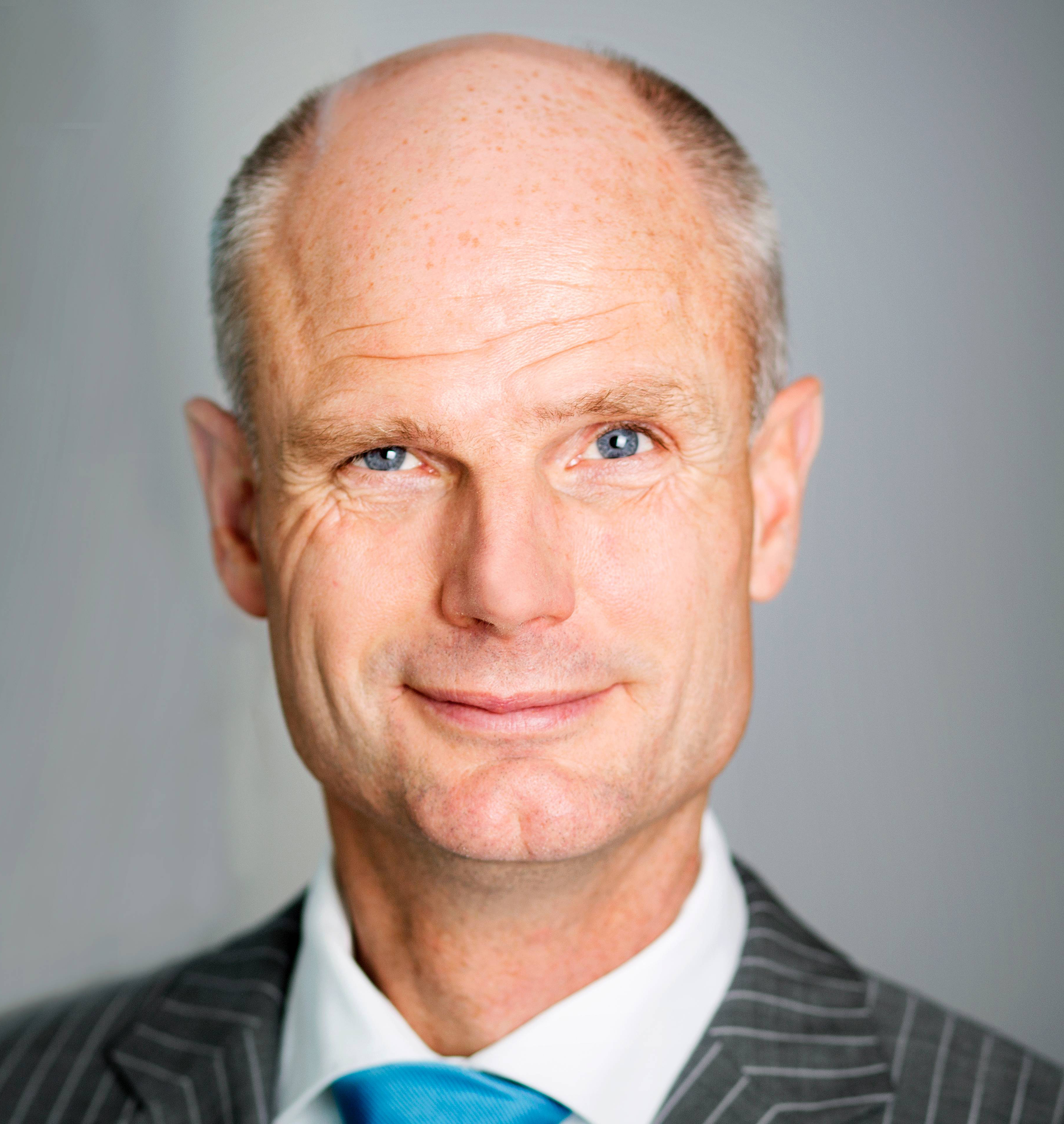
Stef Blok, 2015

=== Public thought and public service ===
- Lucas Janszoon Waghenaer (ca.1534–1606) nautical cartographer
- Franciscus Maelson (1538–1601) physician and statesman
- Dirck Gerritsz Pomp (1544–ca.1608) sailor, the first known Dutch visitor to China and Japan
- Jan Huyghen van Linschoten (1563–1611) merchant, trader and historian
- Joris Carolus (ca.1566–ca.1636) cartographer and explorer
- Johannes Antonides van der Linden (1609–1664) physician, botanist and author
- Hermann Witsius (1636–1708) theologian
- Cornelis Jan Simonsz (ca.1661–ca.1727) Governor of Dutch Ceylon 1703/1707
- Jacob Mossel (1704– 1761) sailor and Governor-General of the Dutch East Indies 1750/1761
- Jan Baas (born 1950) politician and Mayor of Enkhuizen
- Gerrit Zalm (born 1952) banker, former Minister of Finance
- Stef Blok (born 1964) politician and Minister of Foreign Affairs

=== The arts ===
- Pieter Symonsz Potter (1597–1652) Dutch Golden Age painter
- Willem Bartsius (1612–1657) Dutch Golden Age painter.
- Jacob Steendam (1615– ca.1672) poet and minister.
- Paulus Potter (1625–1654) painter
- Pieter Gallis (1633–1697) Dutch Golden Age painter
- Dirck Ferreris (1639–1693) Dutch Golden Age painter
- Jos Lussenburg (1889–1975) painter and musician
- Matthijs Verschoor (born 1955) classical pianist and academic

=== Science and business ===
- Jan Verbruggen (1712–1781) master gun-founder and an artist
- David de Gorter (1717–1783) physician, botanist and academic
- Gerbrand Bakker (1771–1828) physician, professor at the University of Groningen
- Wilhelmina Anna Lub (1900–1986), physicist who worked with Marie Curie
- Harm Bart (born 1942) mathematician, economist and academic

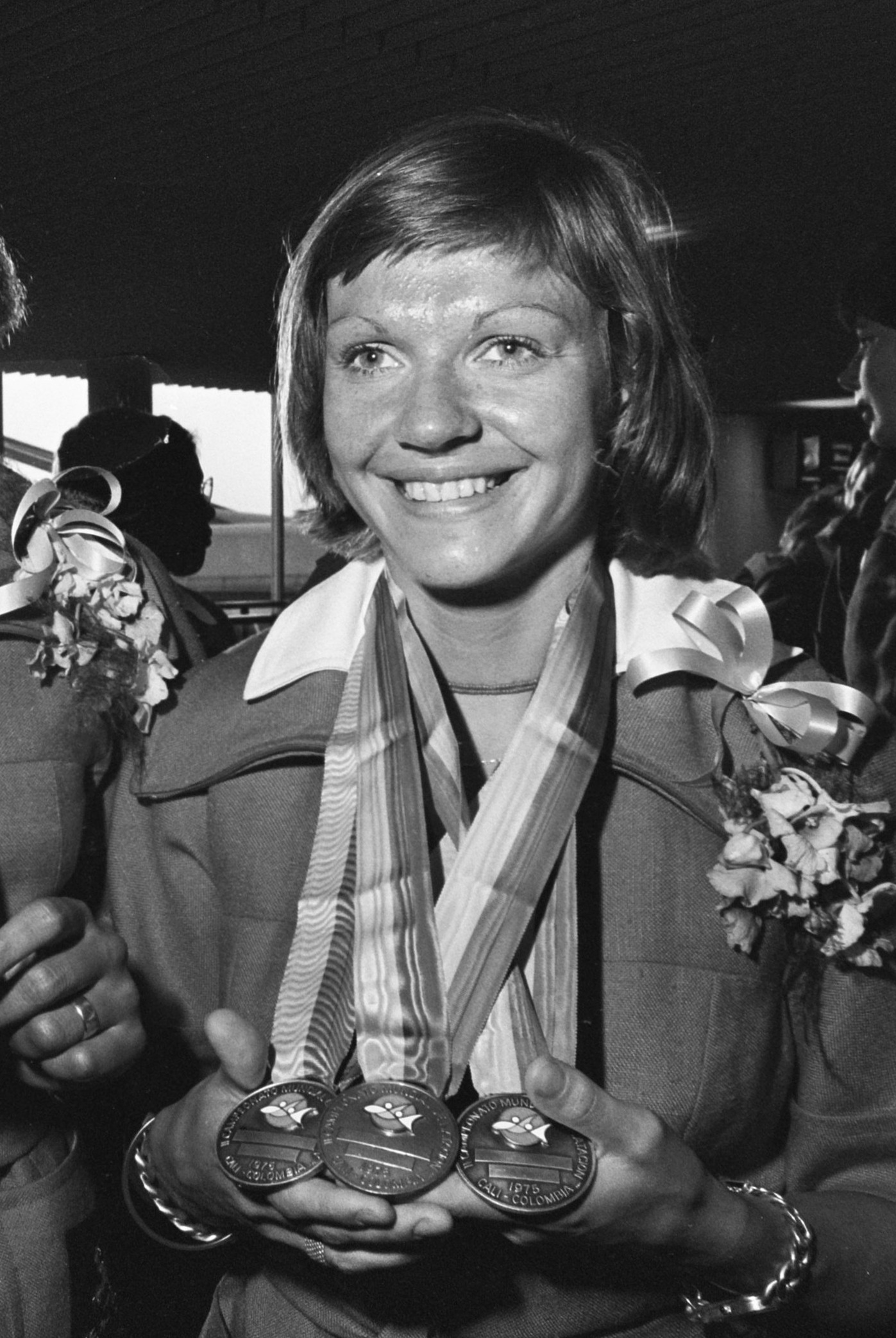
Wijda Mazereeuw, 1975

=== Sport ===
- Corry Vreeken (1928-2025) chess Women's Grandmaster
- Nel Zwier (1936–2001) Dutch high jumper, competed at the 1960 Summer Olympics
- Eljo Kuiler (born 1946) former diver, competed at the 1968 Summer Olympics
- Wijda Mazereeuw (born 1953) Dutch swimmer, competed in the 1972 & 1976 Summer Olympics
