= Northern Quarter =

Northern Quarter may refer to:

- Noorderkwartier, Holland
- Northern Quarter, Brussels
- Northern Quarter, Manchester
