= Sprookjeswonderland =

Fairy tale theme park in Enkhuizen

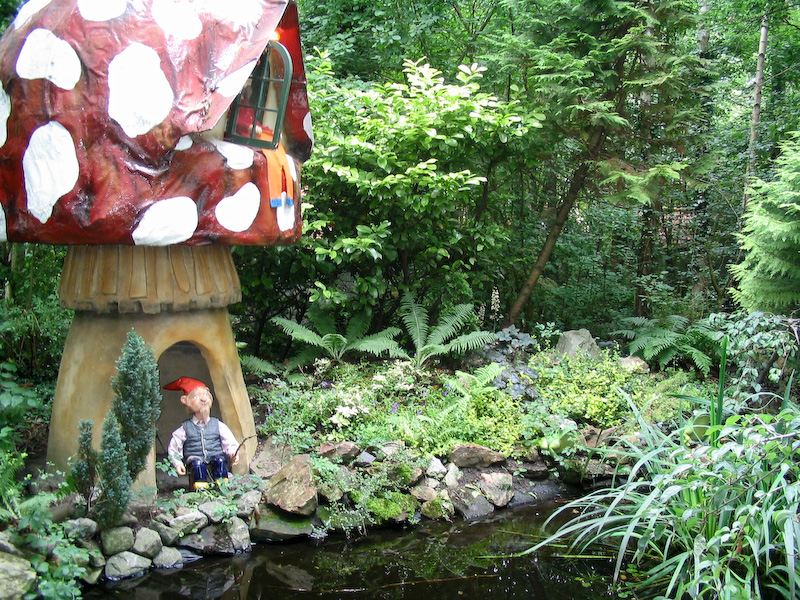
- Interactive map of Sprookjeswonderland
- Location: Enkhuizen, North-Holland, Netherlands
- Coordinates: 52.712°N 5.289°E
- Opened: June 14, 1973 (Changed location in 1991)
- Owner: Wim de Vries, Mathijs de Vries
- Theme: Fairy tales and folklore
- Slogan: Experience the magic (Dutch: Beleef de betovering)
- Operating season: March–October and December–January
- Attendance: ~250.000
- Area: ~7 hectares (17 acres)

Attractions
- Total: 9 (as of 2025)
- Roller coasters: 0
- Water rides: 1
- Website: Official website

Sprookjeswonderland (English: Fairy tale wonderland) is an amusement park in Enkhuizen, Netherlands, themed around folklore and fairy tales. Established in 1973, the park brings classic fairy tales to life through animatronic displays, themed rides, and landscaped gardens, offering an experience primarily aimed at young children and their families.

== History ==
Sprookjeswonderland's history traces back to 1973, when founder Wim de Vries created a gnome doll named Dorus as a joke. The doll's popularity led to the creation of more characters, which were initially showcased at local markets. This traveling exhibition evolved into a permanent attraction, resulting in the establishment of Sprookjeswonderland.

In 1981, the park expanded significantly with the addition of a gnome village, fairy tale scenes, a petting zoo, a playground, and a ladybug-themed water ride, all located in a large park near the city centre. However, by the late 1980s, local residents began complaining about crowds and litter.

Due to space limitations, the park moved to a recreation area adjacent to the IJsselmeer in 1991. Following the move, expansions followed. In 1998, for its 25th anniversary, the park saw the construction of the castle 'Violinde', followed by the 'Tijdhuis' (English: Time House) in 2003, and a new entrance plaza in 2009–2010.

In 2014, the park welcomed around 250,000 visitors annually. Between 2014 and 2016, a major €1.5 million investment brought in the simulator ride 'Hekspeditie'.

In 2020, Sprookjeswonderland was able to open for part of the summer season despite the pandemic. However, due to government lockdowns, Sprookjeswinterland was cancelled for the 2020–2021 winter season. During the park’s closure, the Enkhuizen city council temporarily held meetings in Castle Violinde. In late 2021, the park implemented a COVID entry pass requirement in accordance with national regulations, but had to close again following renewed lockdown measures in December that year.

In 2023, Sprookjeswonderland celebrated its 50th anniversary with new displays about its history and the launch of the new ride.

== Park ==
=== Fairy tales ===
The park contains a fairy tale forest, a wooded trail with scenes from classic fairy tales brought to life through animatronics and storytelling. The concept is reminiscent of the Sprookjesbos in Efteling, though presented on a more intimate scale.

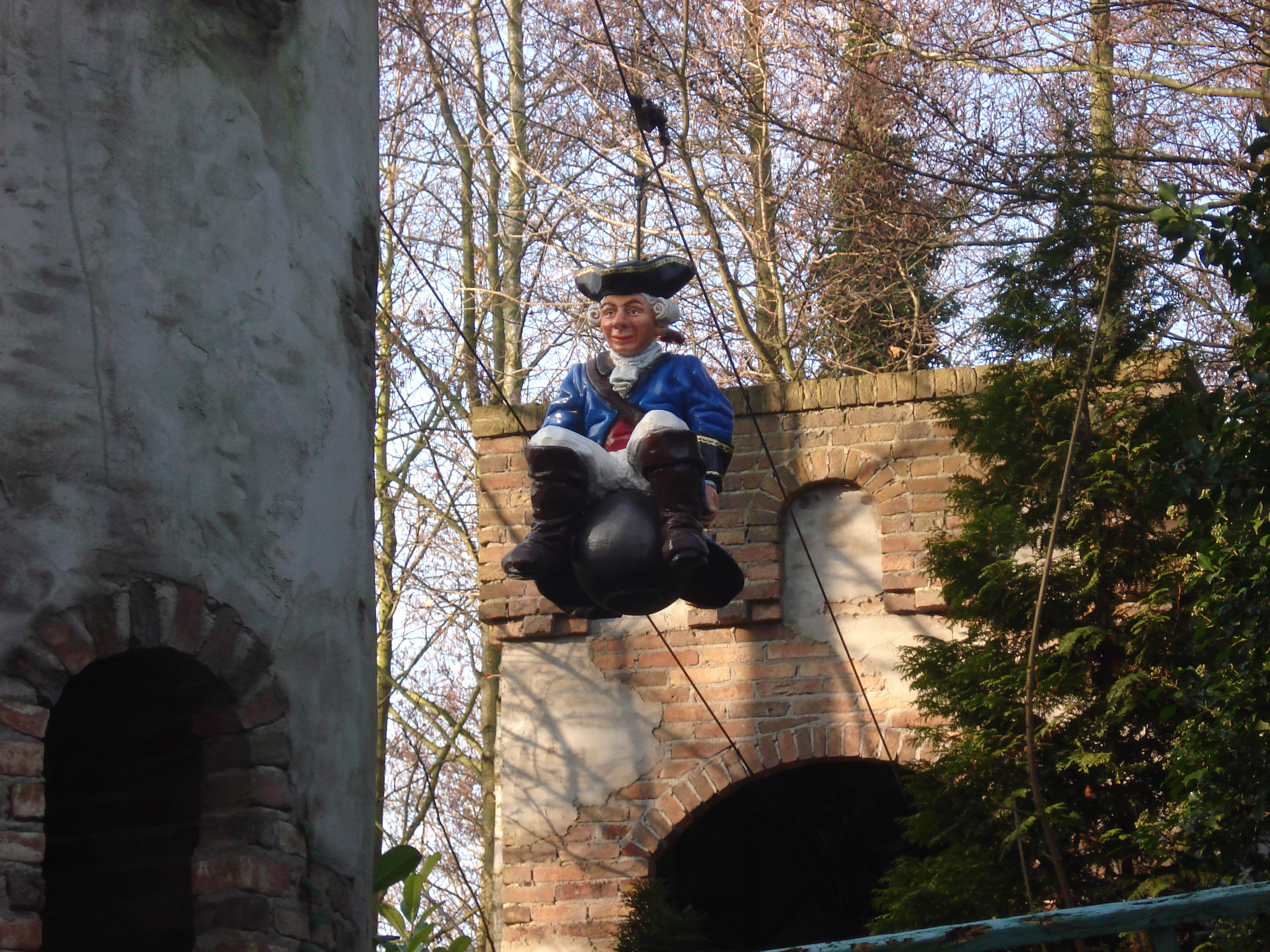
Baron Munchausen

- Baron Munchausen
- Hop-o'-My-Thumb
- Sleeping Beauty
- Snow White
- Puss in Boots
- Hansel and Gretel
- The Wolf and the Seven Young Goats
- The Swineherd
- Little Red Riding Hood
- Pinocchio
- Pied Piper of Hamelin
- Gulliver's Travels
- The Wishing-Table, the Gold-Ass, and the Cudgel in the Sack
- Town Musicians of Bremen
- The Frog Prince
- The Little Mermaid
- 'The Flying Witch and Gnome Cave'
- Magus Fluvius, the wizard

=== Gnome Village ===
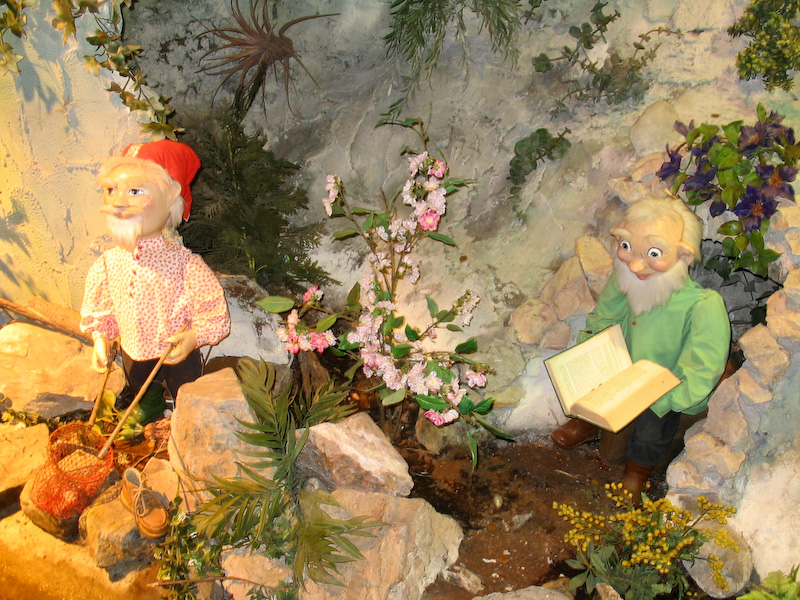
Gnomes in the Gnome Village

The Gnome Village (Dutch: Kabouterdorp) is a whimsical area where visitors can explore a miniature world filled with mushrooms, towers, and houses, each inhabited by its own unique gnome character. The village features scenes and interactive displays.

=== Shows ===
- Violinde Musical: a puppet show in Violinde Castle.
- Time House: a large building depicting the seasons, led by Father Time and the seasonal fairies.
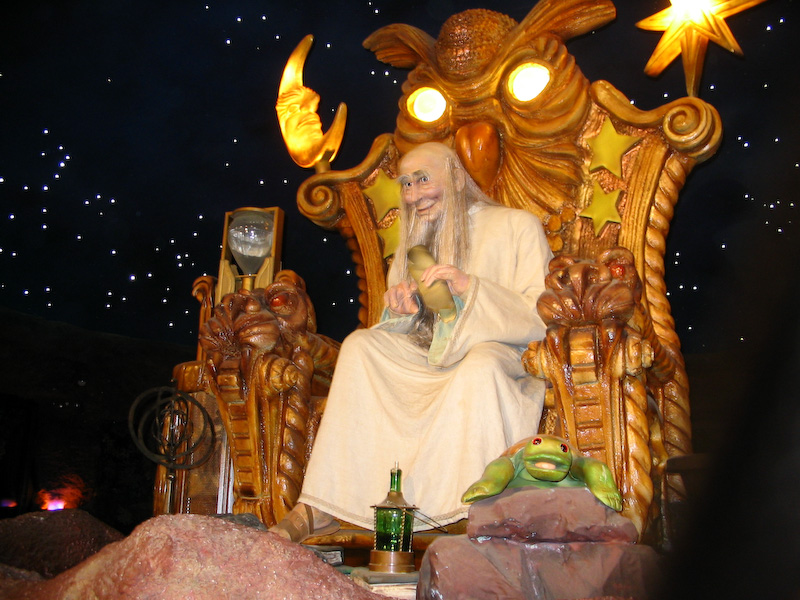
  Animatronic of Father Time
- The Suyder Mermaid: a story about a mermaid adopted by a family in Enkhuizen.
- Gulliver’s Travels
- Oetang Orkest, musical experience featuring orangutans playing instruments

=== Rides ===
- Carousel
- Pirate ship
- Steam train, a mini steam train ride through a section of the park
- Track ride themed around antique cars
- Horsetrack
- Ladybug-themed water ride, rebuilt in 2023.
- Pedal-powered rat-themed carriages, inspired by the Pied Piper of Hamelin fairy tale
- 'Hekspeditie' simulator ride themed around a witch
- Wave boat ride
- Maze
- Excalibur sword in the stone
- Singing Statues, four busts that sing when stood in front of them
- Multiple playgrounds including a carousel, slide, and teacup ride.

=== Shops and dining ===
The park offers several gift shops, food stalls, and dining, including a pancake restaurant.

== Seasonal events ==
=== Sprookjeswinterland ===
Each winter, from mid-December to early January, the park transforms into Sprookjeswinterland. During this festive season, fairy tale characters such as Snow White, Puss in Boots, and Witch 'Hupsakee' roam the park. A large Christmas tree is placed near the entrance, and additional features include a fortune teller and a room for storytelling.

=== Witch Day (Heksendag) ===
Each October, the park organises a Witch Day, during which visitors can encounter costumed witches and take part in themed games. Visitors are encouraged to dress up as witches, wizards, or trolls.

== Flora and fauna ==
The park offers a peaceful, natural environment, renowned for its flower gardens, created in collaboration with Syngenta. The petting zoo allows visitors to interact with domesticated animals such as goats, sheep, and rabbits. An aviary and other animal habitats can also be found in the park.
