= Jos Lussenburg =

Dutch painter

Johannes "Jos" Lussenburg
- Born: 20 November 1889; Enkhuizen, Netherlands
- Died: 28 July 1975 (aged 85); Nunspeet, Netherlands
- Education: Self-taught
- Known for: Painting

Johannes "Jos" Lussenburg (Enkhuizen, 20 November 1889 – Nunspeet, 28 July 1975) was a Dutch painter and musician.

Lussenburg was a self-taught painter. Originally he was a professional musician: he was a music teacher at several music schools, played the violin, and was conductor of several choirs.

== Private life ==
Lussenburg was born in Enkhuizen, a small fishing village at the west-coast of the former Zuiderzee, currently the IJsselmeer. After his marriage in 1917 to Jantje Langendijk, he moved to Meerssen in Limburg. The couple had three children: a girl, Baukje (born in 1918), and two boys, Hans and Loek, (born in 1920 and 1926, respectively).

In 1918, Lussenburg's parents moved to Nunspeet, a village near the Zuiderzee south-coast and, after a family visit, Jos gave up his job as a teacher in the South to move with his family to Nunspeet because he loved it as a place to paint.

Lussenburg's grandfather was a professional fisherman from Enkhuizen and he loved the romance of the rough live as fisher. He made many friends among the many fishermen in the villages and ports around the Zuiderzee.

Due to the construction of the Afsluitdijk, completed in 1932, the Zuiderzee changed into a fresh-water lake: the IJsselmeer. The fishing industry fell into decline in all villages and towns around the new lake.

== Career ==
When Lussenburg hurt his hand in 1923, an infection of a finger on his left hand ended his career as violin player and on advice of his wife he took up painting. But he never lost his love for the music and remained active as director of several choirs in villages near Nunspeet.

Many of Lussenburg's paintings show the rough waves of the shallow Zuiderzee with one or more fishing sailing boats in action. Beside his paintings of fishing vessels at sea, he also painted portraits of old fishermen, farmers, beggars, and some self-portraits. His work was part of the painting event in the art competition at the 1932 Summer Olympics.

In 1963, he published a book called De stervende zee (The dying sea) about the end of the fishing industry in the former Zuiderzee. Later, in 1975, a book De stervende Zuiderzee (The dying Zuiderzee) dealt with the same problem. In the books, pictures of his paintings together with several stories about the life of the fishers.

== Exhibitions ==
The paintings of Lussenburg have found their way into several museums about the Zuiderzee or IJsselmeer and there are two virtual expositions of his work on the internet.
