= Evangelical Lutheran Church (Enkhuizen) =

Former church in the Netherlands

Evangelical Lutheran Church, Enkhuizen
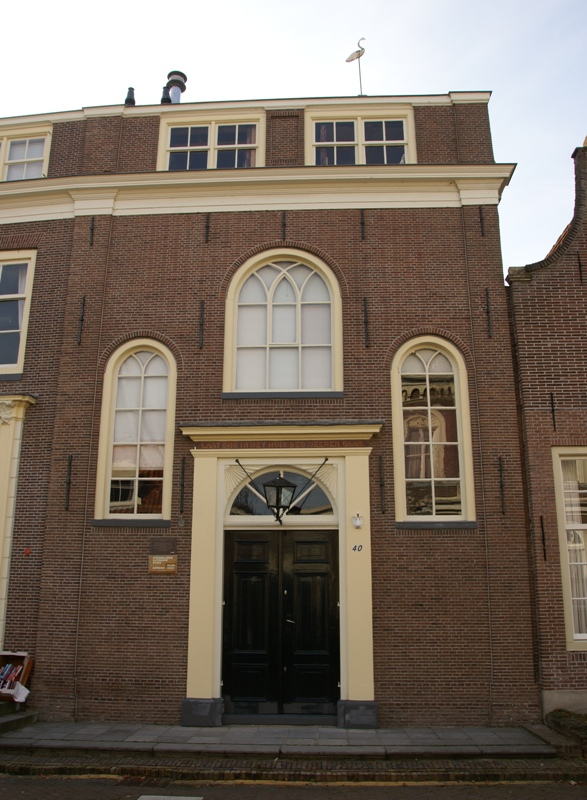
- Evangelical Lutheran Church, Enkhuizen
- 52°42′16″N 5°17′40″E
- Denomination: Evangelical Lutheran Church in the Kingdom of the Netherlands

History
- Status: Rijksmonument
- Founded: 1623

The Evangelical Lutheran Church on the Breedstraat 40, Enkhuizen, is a former church of the Evangelical Lutheran Church in the Kingdom of the Netherlands. The congregation was founded in 1623 by the family of a Danish Lutheran merchant, Frederik Dirxen van Tatinghof, who had come to Enkhuizen for the trade in oxen, and was severely suppressed until 1641, when the congregation was allowed to gather in a building acquired by one of Tatinghof's sons. When the congregation shrank in the 1800s, it acquired the building at the Breedstraat and dedicated it in 1843. In 2017 it moved to another building in the city. The church on Breedstraat 40, the parsonage on no. 42, and the sacristy on no. 44 are Rijksmonuments.

== History ==
The Lutheran community in Enkhuizen originated with Danish traders; in 1596 Frederik Dirxen van Tatinghof moved to Enkhuizen from either Friedrichstadt (a city in Schleswig-Holstein that had been founded by Dutch Remonstrants and Mennonites) or Tönning. Tatinghof was invited by the city of Enkhuizen to come and set up the oxen trade there, with the expectation that the city would take over that market from Hoorn. He became master of the market and started a business fattening cattle; he also ran an inn, the De Rode Leeuw aan de Palmtak. Fattening cattle was an important part of the Westfrisian economy, and in 1605 the biggest market for cattle was moved from Hoorn to Enkhuizen; Tatinghof became the most powerful man in the oxen trade.

One of Tatinghof's sons, Frederik (1599–1661), studied theology in Germany and was registered as a preacher in Enkhuizen in 1635. The other son, Pieter, co-founded a Lutheran congregation (on 23 January 1623) in a little garden house on the Lazeruspad, and in March of that year they rented a house on the Burgwal (the Spaanse leger). Eight people were present at this first meeting, though it turned out later that one of them was actually a Catholic; by February there were 25, but during Easter the city government shut the church down, and for the next decade services were held secretly, it seems at the Lazeruspad. The denomination was under pressure from the city government (the Dutch Reformed Church being a de facto state religion) and Lutherans were deemed suspicious because they had supported the Remonstrants, who had been violently suppressed in the first decade of the 17th century. Lutherans were not allowed to meet openly and were frequently persecuted; church services were disrupted and on one occasion the preacher was arrested and jailed. Pieter Tatinghof was arrested also, in 1632. In 1632 Frederik Tatinghof, who now became more involved in church matters, acquired a house with adjacent an old industrial building, the Ververij, on the Noorder Boerenvaart; this building, which had been a paint factory until it was closed because of the pollution it caused, would later become the congregation's first real church. Frederik had been an assistant preacher in Amsterdam in 1624 and from 1627 to 1630 was a minister in Middelburg, and then returned to Enkhuizen to assist his elderly mother.

The Tatinghof congregation, led after 1629 by a German minister called Georgius Hahn, already ministered to many foreigners: traders from Denmark and Schleswig-Holstein visited Enkhuizen three times a year (in the spring for oxen, in the summer for grain, and in the fall for herring), and they were very unhappy with the lack of religious freedom in Enkhuizen, a freedom they enjoyed everywhere else in the Dutch Republic. To be allowed to worship they filed a series of written requests (the first in 1623) with the city, but to no avail. In April 1632 the conflict came to a head: the city, guided by the local Calvinist clergy, boarded up the building on the Lazeruspad, and after the congregation moved to the Noorder Boerenvaart, this was boarded up as well, and the benches torn out. Unfortunately for the city government, they had picked the day before the oxen market to close the church, and the next day a large group of angry merchants presented their fifth and final written request. The church on the Lazeruspad was opened temporarily, though it was shut again after they left, and afterward services were sometimes held in Tatinghof's inn. But by the end of the year Frederik Tatinghof was told in no uncertain terms he should leave town. He finally gave up his ministry in 1635 and moved to Amsterdam. Afterward, the Danish traders were allowed to bring their own preacher when they visited Enkhuizen, but he would have to leave with them. When that preacher, a man from the Danish town of Tønder, stayed behind, the city expelled him. In the end, it was not until 1641 that the congregation was allowed to have its own church, in the building acquired the decade before by Frederik.

=== The church on the Noorder Boerenvaart ===
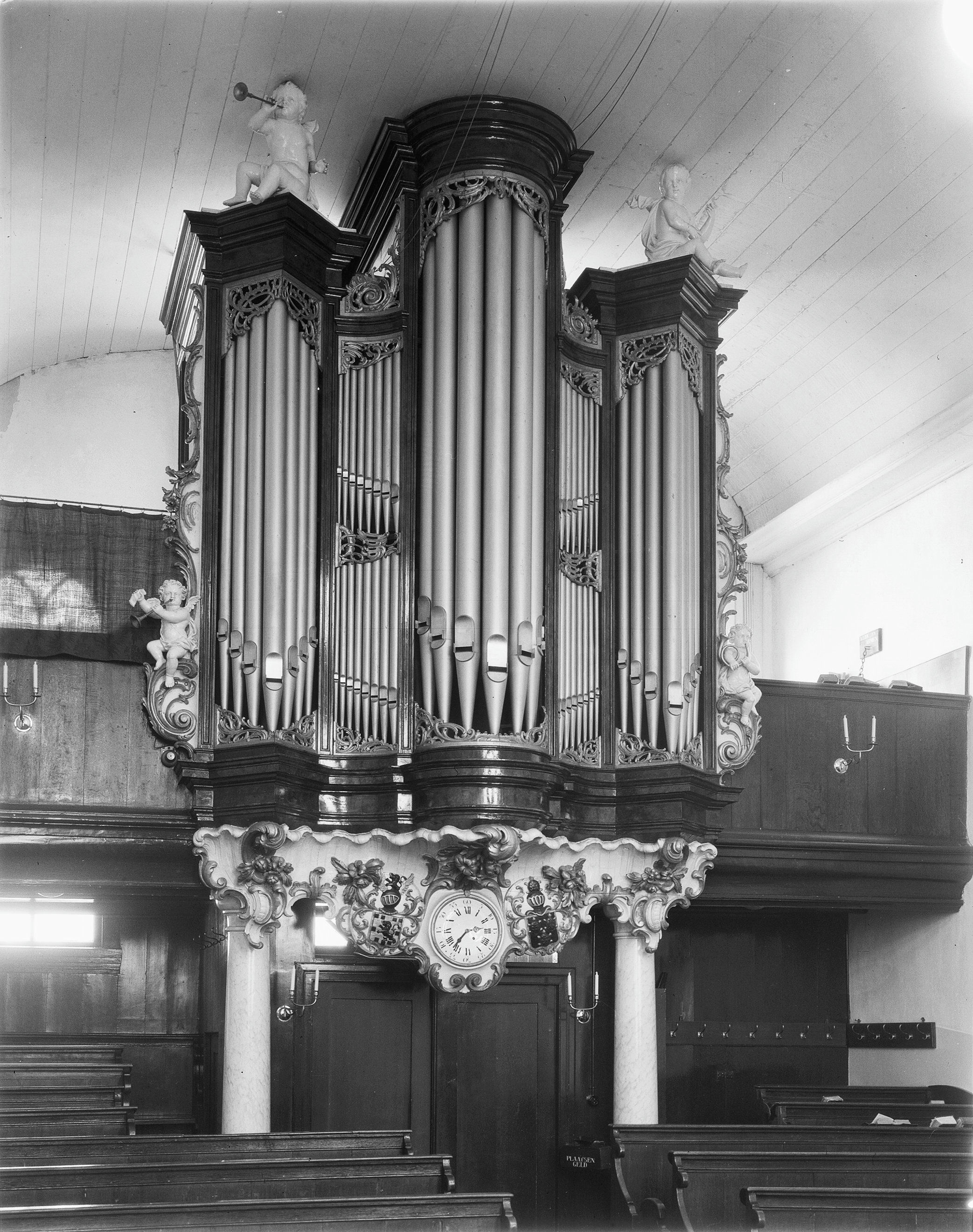
The organ in its post-1843 location on the Breedstraat.

The Lutheran congregation bought the Ververij in 1641, for 4,000 Carolus guilders. Much of the funds were raised from Lutheran communities on the Baltic Sea. The church was likely enlarged in 1667, since there is documentation for building materials worth over 400 Carolus guilders, and by 1718 had between three- and four hundred members. Renovations took place in 1725, and a new parsonage was built. It was renovated again in 1734–35, when a new front gable was placed and a pulpit by Pieter de Nicolo was installed. The purchase of an organ was approved in 1780, and after many delays it was installed in 1782, from the shop of Gideon Thomas Bätz. The organ had ten registers, and cost 1,800 guilders.

=== Move to the Breedstraat, 1843 ===
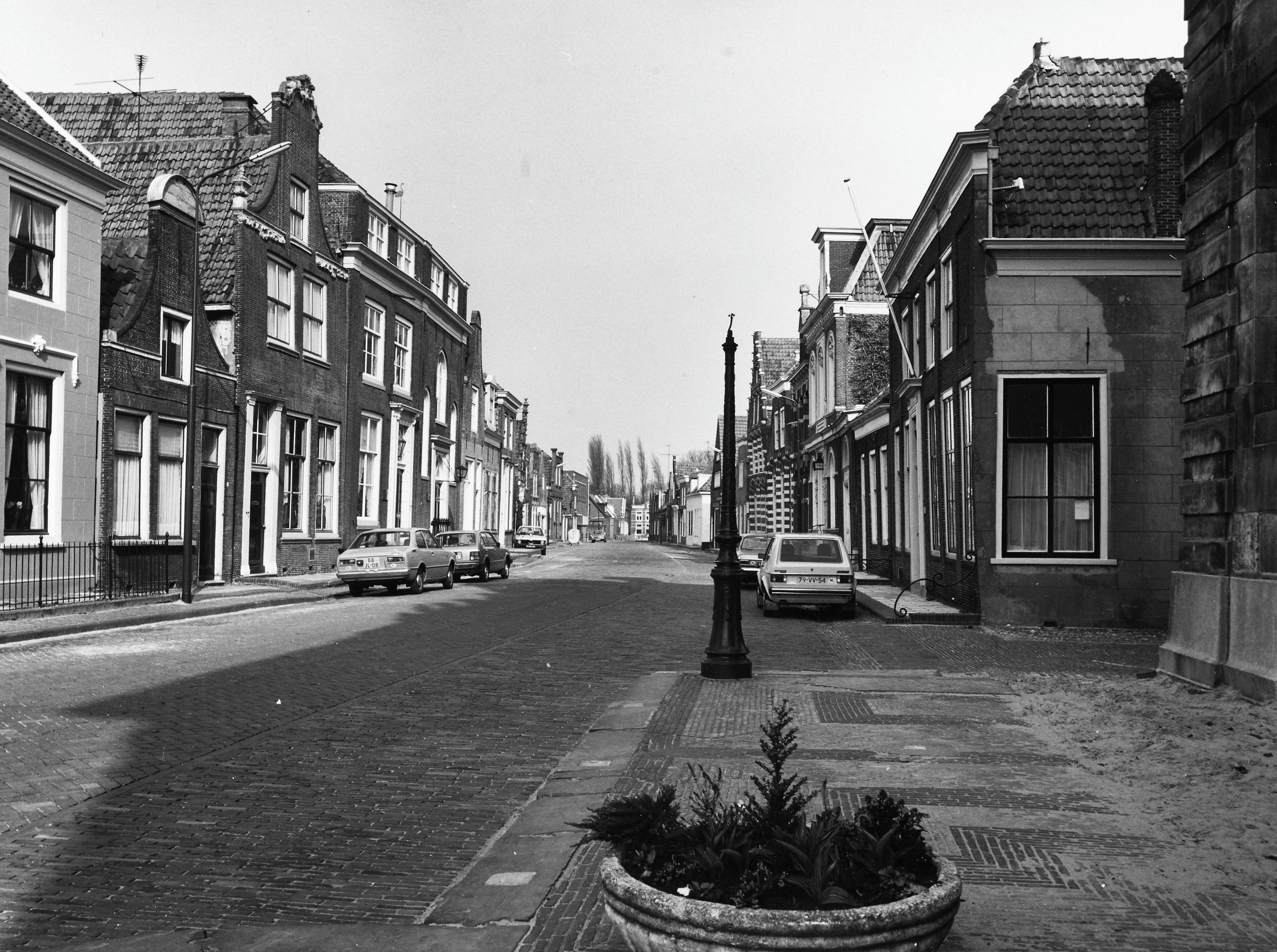
On the left, the three church buildings; the first car is parked in front of no. 44, the sacristy.

When the local economy weakened in the beginning of the 19th century, so did the Lutheran congregation, which shrank from 354 members in 1798 to 70 in 1869. The church had become too big and too costly, and in 1843 the congregation sold the old church and bought a townhouse on the Breedstraat, converting it to an aisleless church with a barrel-vaulted roof. The church was dedicated on 17 December 1843; the building on no. 42 was the parsonage, and that on no. 44 the sacristy. Church and parsonage were given a new front gable; the sacristy kept its 1753 clock gable. The pulpit and the organ were moved to the new building, though decorative parts of the organ had to be removed; work on the organ was done by Luitjen Jacob van Dam (1783–1846), second generation of the Van Dam (organ builders) firm. A renovation in 1910 removed the by now rare pipes installed by Bätz. In 1943, for the church's 100th anniversary, an altar, designed by Ferdinand Jantzen in the style of the pulpit, was added. After World War II a new baptismal font was installed, in addition to leaded windows made by Lutheran preacher and glassmaker P.H.G.C. Kok. All three buildings are categorized as Rijksmonuments—the church is listed as 14998, the parsonage 14999, the sacristy 15000.

=== Move to Patershof, 2017 ===
The Evangelical Lutheran Church in the Kingdom of the Netherlands merged with other Protestant Dutch denominations in 2004 to form the Protestant Church in the Netherlands. The Breedstraat congregation moved to a new church, Patershof 4 in Enkhuizen, on 5 June 2017.
