= Eljo Kuiler =

Dutch diver (born 1946)

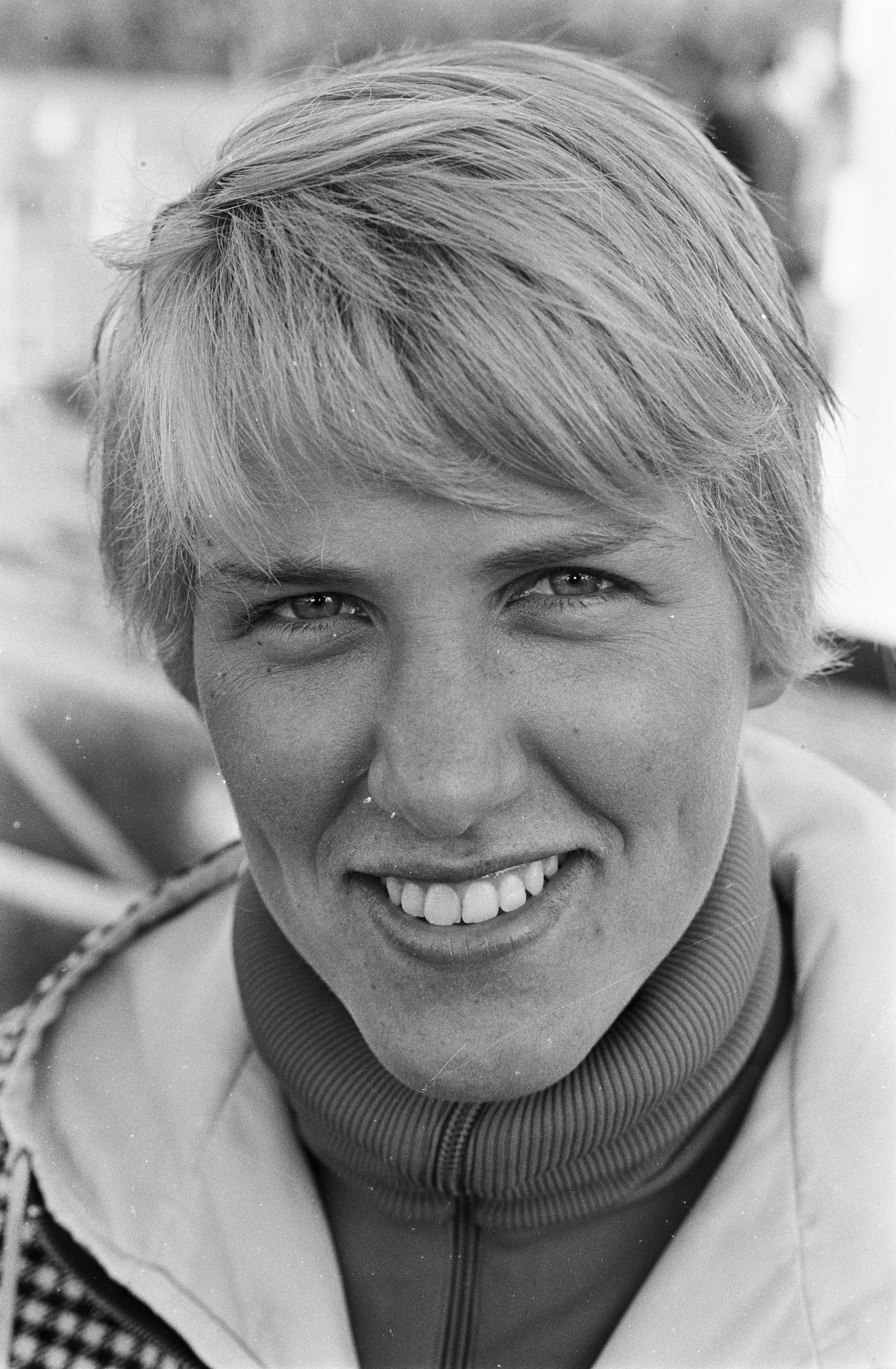
- Eljo Kuiler in 1968

Personal information
- Born: 6 April 1946 (age 80) Enkhuizen, Netherlands
- Height: 1.69 m (5 ft 7 in)
- Weight: 65 kg (143 lb)

Elselina Johanna "Eljo" Kuiler (born 6 April 1946) is a former diver from the Netherlands. She competed at the 1968 Summer Olympics in springboard and finished in 16th place.
