= Gerbrand Bakker (physician) =

Dutch physician

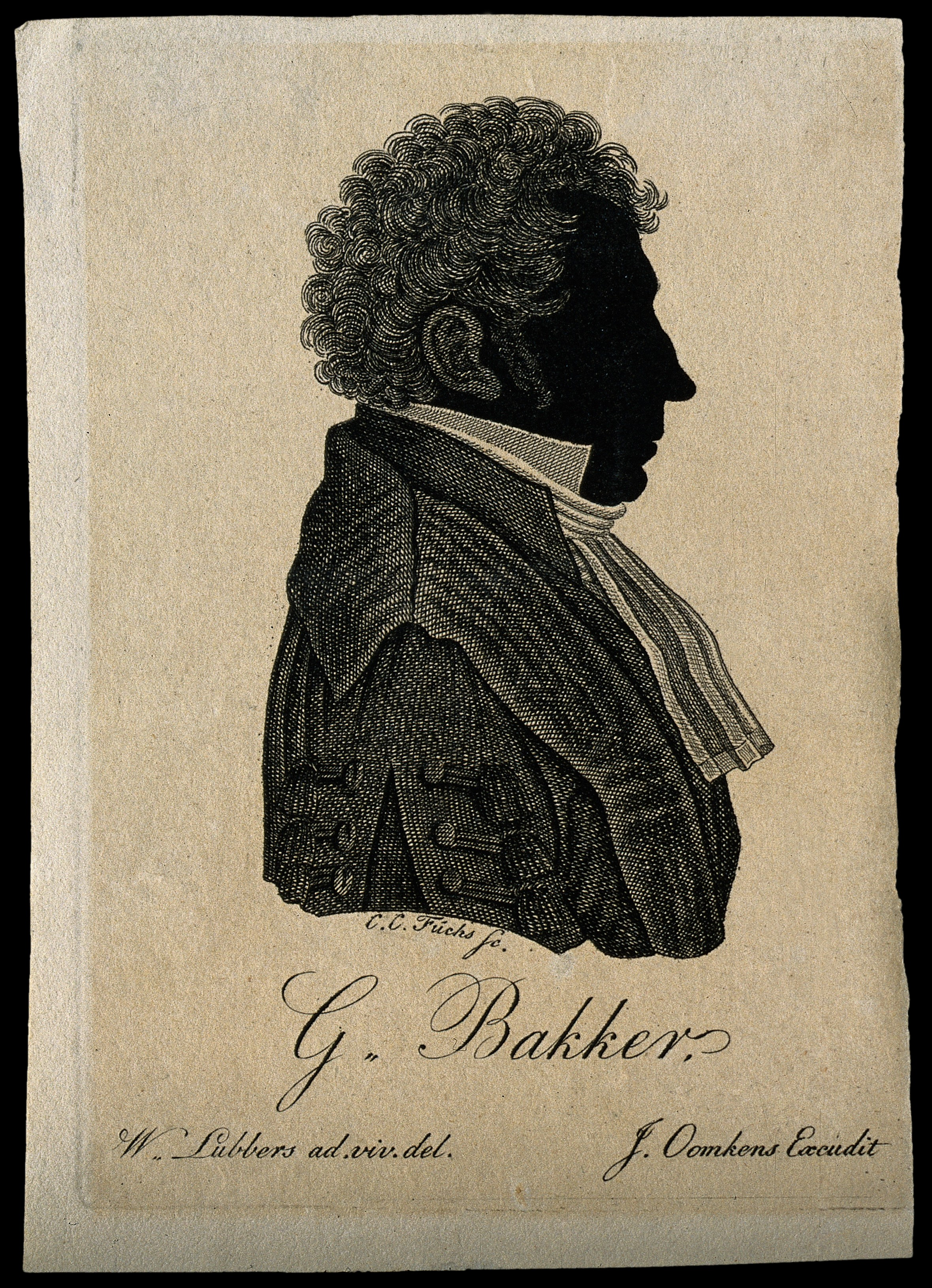
Gerbrand Bakker

Gerbrand Bakker (Enkhuizen, November 1, 1771 – Groningen, June 15, 1828) was a medical doctor from the Netherlands. He was a professor at the University of Groningen.

He first studied medicine with M.S. du Pui, physician in Alkmaar. In 1788 he enrolled at the University of Groningen, transferring two years later to the University of Leiden, where he received his doctorate in May 1794. His instructors were the celebrated Dupui, Sandifort, Paradys, and Voltelen. He married Jacoba Johanna Poel on January 4, 1800 at Enkhuizen. He practised first at Edam, and was made a reader at the Teyler surgical school at Haarlem in 1806. The next year, he declined a professorship at the University of Franeker. In 1811, under the French, he was named to the professorship at Groningen. He was active in the severe epidemic disease which afflicted Groningen in 1826.

Bakker was distinguished most for his great skill and knowledge in midwifery and practical surgery. On the former he published several works in Dutch and Latin. Amongst his Dutch writings are a treatise on animal magnetism, another on worms, in which he controverted the opinions of professor Rudolphi of Berlin; and a third on the human eye. Bakker occupied himself also with zeal on comparative anatomy, and particularly on the anatomy of the brain.

His most celebrated works in Latin are Descriptio Iconis Pelvis Feminae (1816), Osteographia Piscium (1822), Epidemium quae anno 1826 urbem Groningam afflixit (1826) and De Natura Hominis Liber elementarius (1827). This last work, which was to have formed a complete body of anatomy, was left incomplete by the author's death.

Bakker became a correspondent of the Royal Institute, predecessor to the Royal Netherlands Academy of Arts and Sciences, in 1812.
