= Coat of arms of Enkhuizen =

Coat of arms of Enkhuizen

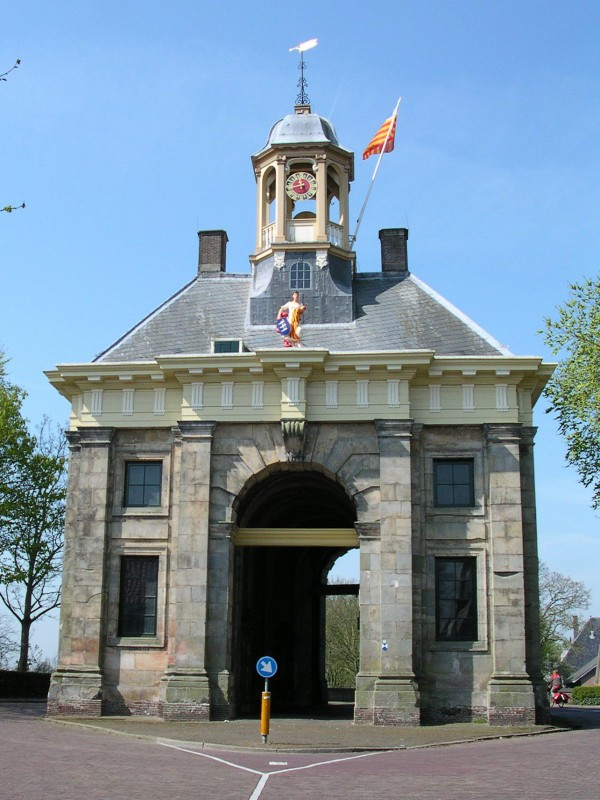
Koepoort or Westerpoort with the coat of arms and the flag of Enkhuizen.

The coat of arms of Enkhuizen has been the coat of arms ever since Enkhuizen received borough rights in 1355. The coat of arms was acknowledged in 1816 by the High Council of Nobility, the coat of arms has not been changed ever since.

== History ==
The oldest known seal dates from 1361. The herrings stand upright. They probably symbolise the importance of fishery. Besides the herrings the seal also shows two six pointed stars. The seal was used until 1478. A new seal was created in 1538. This seal shows the herrings placed horizontally on a shield. This shield - or escutcheon - is held by a woman standing on the side. In 1816 Enkhuizen received a new coat of arms, acknowledged by the High Council of Nobility.

The herrings on the seal have never been crowned. In the atlas made by Willem Blaeu they do wear crowns. The coat of arms is shown in azure and argent.

The coat of arms is also shown in the canton of the flag of Enkhuizen. Herrings were also used on the coat of arms of the water board Drechterland.

This coat of arms was partially formed by map makers who expressed their artistic freedom during the creation process. Until 1816 the herrings looked towards the right (left from the viewpoint of the bearer), they had no crowns and there were two stars between the herrings. Both stars had six points but since 1816 they have eight points. The supporter probably is the personification of Enkhuizen, in Dutch stedenmaagd.

== Heraldic elements ==
The coat of arms exists out of an escutcheon and a supporter. There is no crown, motto or other heraldic element.

=== Escutcheon ===
The field of the coat of arms is azure and charged with three vertically ordered argent herrings looking to the right and placed en fasce. All three have a crown or three acanthus leaves (in Dutch heraldry: fleurons) above their head. Above the dorsal spines they have a star containing eight points.

=== Supporter ===
The supporter is not properly described in the emblazonment. She is only described as a woman standing. Neither the cloths, nor the way the woman holds the escutcheon is described. Usually she wears white clothing and she holds a shield using a red ribbon to do so. She always pictured on the right side (left from the viewpoint of the bearer) of the coat of arms, and on a field of grass.

== Comparable coats of arms ==
Coat of arms of Dijkgraafschap Drechterland

Coat of arms of De Rijp, had one herring less, because Enkhuizen was more important as herring fishing city

Coat of arms of Scheveningen, but this is an old family coat of arms dat became a "dorpswapen"

== Notes ==
All references are in Dutch.
