= Enza Zaden =

Dutch vegetable breeding company

- Industry: Biotechnology
- Founded: 1938
- Founder: Jacob Mazereeuw
- Headquarters: Enkhuizen
- Products: Vegetable Seeds
- Number of employees: >3000
- Website: enzazaden.com

Enza Zaden is an international vegetable breeding company headquartered in Enkhuizen, the Netherlands, in North Holland. The company develops new vegetable varieties for the professional market and sells seeds worldwide. It is an independent, family-owned company with more than 3,000 employees, spread across 45 locations in 26 countries.

"Enza" is an abbreviation of the former name "Enkhuizer Zaadhandel".

== History ==
Enza Zaden was founded in 1938 by Jacob Mazereeuw as De Enkhuizer Zaadwinkel. Initially, the company sold vegetable seeds, seed potatoes, and legumes to consumers with home gardens, but after World War II it shifted its focus entirely to professional open-field and greenhouse vegetable growers. In 1944, the company's name was changed to De Enkhuizer Zaadhandel.

In 1959, Jacob's son Piet took up the breeding activities. His introduction of the tomato variety Extase in 1962 marked a breakthrough. The success of this variety enabled the company to invest in expanding its staff, technology, and multiple breeding programs.

From 1985 onward, Enza Zaden expanded internationally. Its first foreign office was established in the United Kingdom, followed by research and breeding locations in, among others, Spain, Italy, Indonesia, the United States, France, Turkey, and Germany. In less than fifteen years, the company developed into a player with a global presence.

In the decades that followed, Enza Zaden continued to grow through further professionalization, innovation in breeding techniques, and expansion into new markets. In 2011, Jaap Mazereeuw was appointed CEO. He is now the third generation of the Mazereeuw family to lead the company.

== Activities ==
Enza Zaden focuses on the development, production, and global sale of vegetable seeds. The company breeds more than thirty vegetable crops, including tomato, cucumber, pepper, lettuce, onion, and melon. The breeding programs aim to develop varieties with improved traits, such as higher yield, taste, shelf life, ease of cultivation, and resistance to diseases and pests. In addition, the product range is adapted to almost all climate zones and the diverse needs of different cultures.

The organic segment of Enza Zaden is developed and sold under the brand Vitalis Biologische Zaden, an international brand dedicated to 100% organic seeds for vegetables and herbs for the professional organic market. The Expertise Centrum of Vitalis in Voorst (Gelderland) has been committed to organic research and development for over thirty years. Its focus is on cultivation under organic conditions, seed production research, and innovative organic farming methods. With this expertise, Vitalis supports professional organic growers in making sustainable and resilient choices.

Enza Zaden breeds its products using traditional methods, without genetic modification. However, advanced technology is employed in the breeding process to enhance seed quality and performance.

Enza Zaden is part of the Stichting Seed Valley, a collaborative network of companies in the Kop van Noord-Holland region that are active in horticultural products.
