= Jazz Festival Enkhuizen =

Annual jazz festival in Enkhuizen, Netherlands

Coordinates: 52.7036°N 5.2900°E

The Jazz Festival Enkhuizen was founded in 1974 in Enkhuizen, Netherlands. Since, it has grown into a four-day festival with both domestic and foreign jazz artists. In recent years, the event is held in the first weekend of June. The Enkhuizen Jazz Festival is known for its historic downtown (largely dated from the Dutch Golden Age) in which mostly young jazz artists are programmed on the in- and outdoor stages.

== Artists who performed at the festival ==
- Beryl Bryden (United Kingdom)
- Boogie Boy (Belgium)
- Chris Barber (England)
- Goodluck (South Africa)
- Jazz Five (Denmark)
- Jean Shy (United States)
- Jonny Boston (United Kingdom)
- King Pleasure and the Biscuit Boys (United Kingdom)
- Lillian Boutté (United States)
- Max Collie's Rhythm Aces (United Kingdom)
- Pink Turtle (France)
- Rosenberg Trio (The Netherlands)
- Shannon Powell (United States)
- Tuba Skinny (United States)
