= Willem Bartsius =

Dutch Golden Age painter

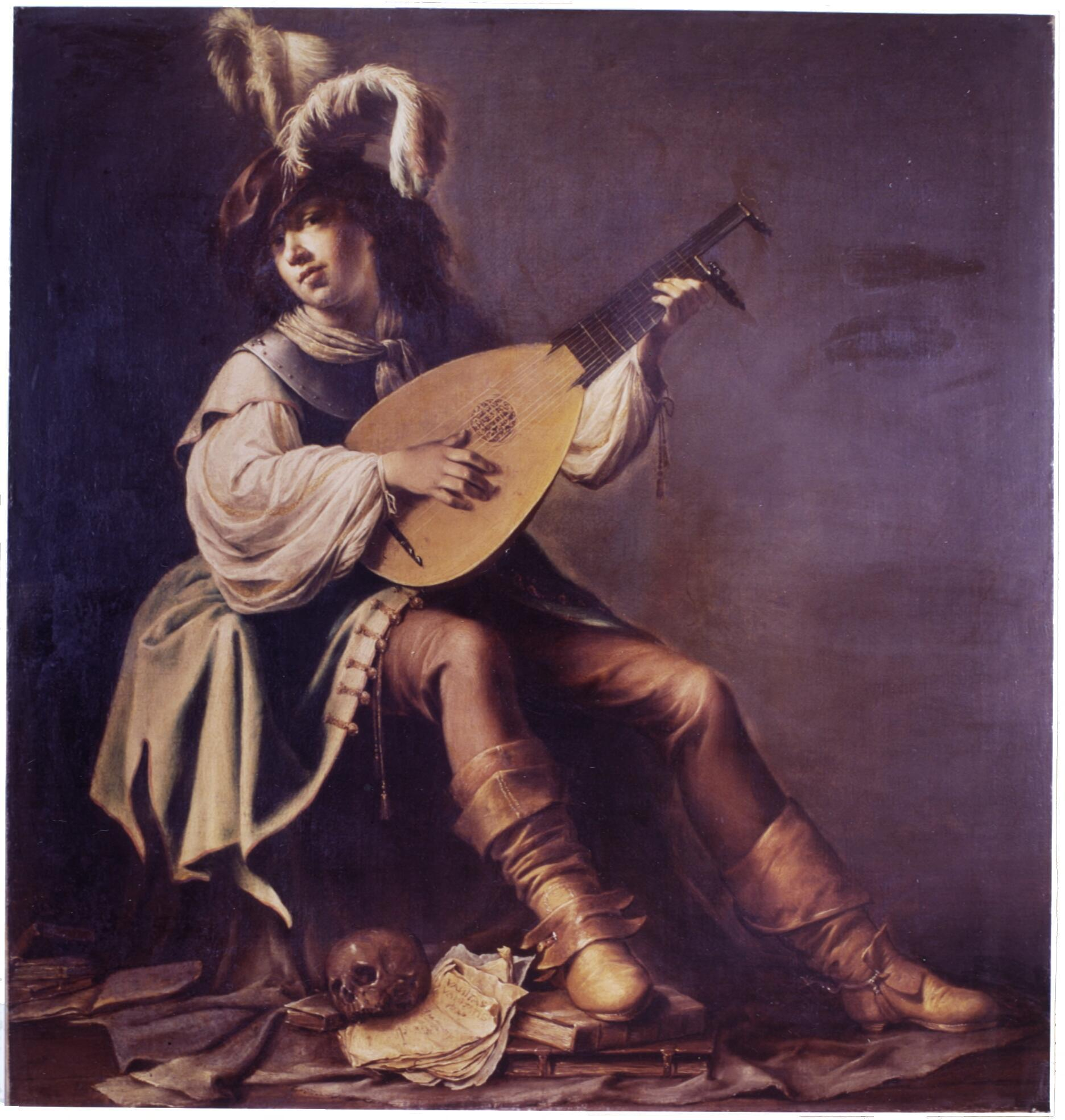
Lute player with skull and books

Willem Bartsius (1612, Enkhuizen – 1657, Enkhuizen), was a Dutch Golden Age painter.

== Biography ==
According to Houbraken, who mentioned his sister as Paulus Potter's mother, his father was Paulus Bertius, the city secretary of Enkhuizen, and his mother was descended from the House of Egmont.

According to the RKD he became a member of the Alkmaar Guild of St. Luke in 1634 where he took on the pupil Abraham Meyndertsz, but in 1636 he moved to Amsterdam and little is known of him after 1639. He is known for both landscapes and portraits, including a schutterstuk in Alkmaar.
