= Lucas Janszoon Waghenaer =

Dutch cartographer

Lucas Waghenaer
- Born: Lucas Janszoon Waghenaer; Unknown, c. 1534; Enkhuizen, Habsburg Netherlands
- Died: Unknown, c. 1606 (aged 71–72); Enkhuizen, Dutch Republic
- Other names: Lucas Ioannes Aurigarius
- Occupation: Nautical cartographer
- Works: Spieghel der zeevaerdt (1584); Thresoor der zeevaert (1592); Enchuyser zeecaertboeck (1598)

Lucas Janszoon Waghenaer (c. 1534–c. 1606) was a Dutch cartographer and a notable figure of the Golden Age of Netherlandish cartography, known for his pioneering contributions on the subject of nautical cartography.

== Career ==
=== Seafaring ===
Waghenaer is considered one of the leading figures of the North Holland school, which played a significant role in the early development of Dutch nautical chart-making. Between 1550 and 1579, he sailed as a chief officer, gaining experience at sea over nearly three decades.

This experience gave him a strong working knowledge of maritime charts, sailing directions, and coastal navigation, which later informed his cartographic work. After his seafaring career, he worked in the port of Enkhuizen as a collector of maritime dues.

=== Cartography ===
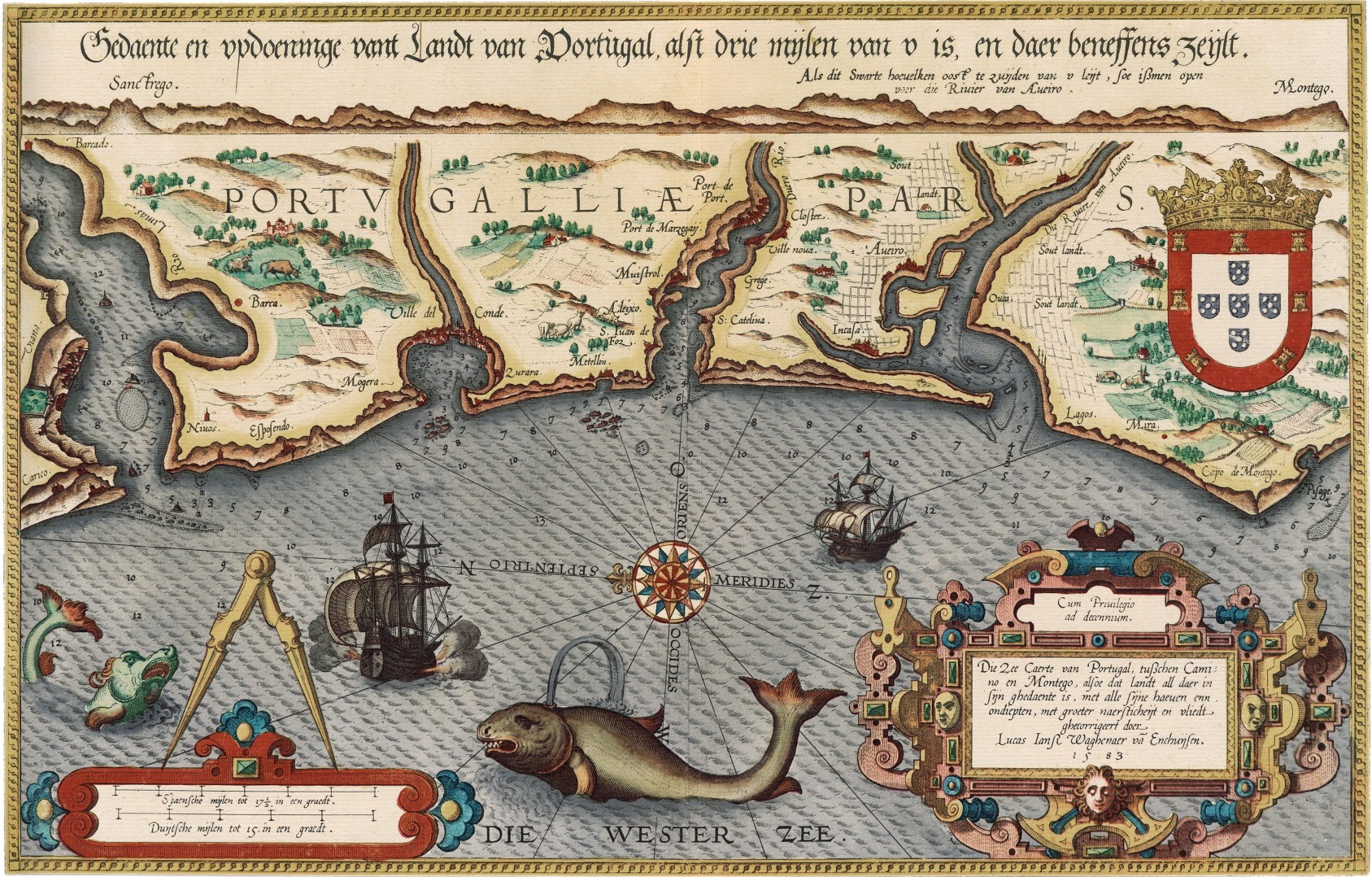
"Zee Caerte van Portugal" (1584)

His first publication, Spieghel der zeevaerdt ("Mariner's mirror"), appeared in 1584. This chart-book combined an atlas of nautical charts and sailing directions with instructions for navigation on the western and north-western coastal waters of Europe.

It presented charts and accompanying sailing directions together in a systematic format intended for practical use by navigators.

It was the first of its kind in the history of nautical cartography, and was an immediate success. A second part was published the next year and was reprinted several times, and translated into English, German, Latin, and French.

In 1592, his second pilot book, Thresoor der zeevaert ("Treasure of navigation"), was published. His third and last publication, Enchuyser zeecaertboeck ("Enkhuizen sea-chart-book"), was released in 1598.

== Death ==
Waghenaer died around 1606, in Enkhuizen and in apparent poverty, moving the municipal authorities to extend his pension a year longer for his widow.
