= Noorderkwartier =

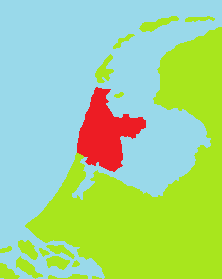
Location of the Noorderkwartier in the Netherlands

Noorderkwartier (Dutch pronunciation: [ˈnoːrdərkʋɑrˌtiːr]; English: Northern Quarter) is a historical term referring to the part of the former Dutch province of Holland north of the river IJ, covering the regions Kennemerland, Zaanstreek, Waterland and West Friesland and now part of the modern province of North Holland. Other historical terms for this area were "North Holland", "Noordeland", and "Noorderland". The southern part was called the Southern Quarter.
