= History of Enkhuizen =

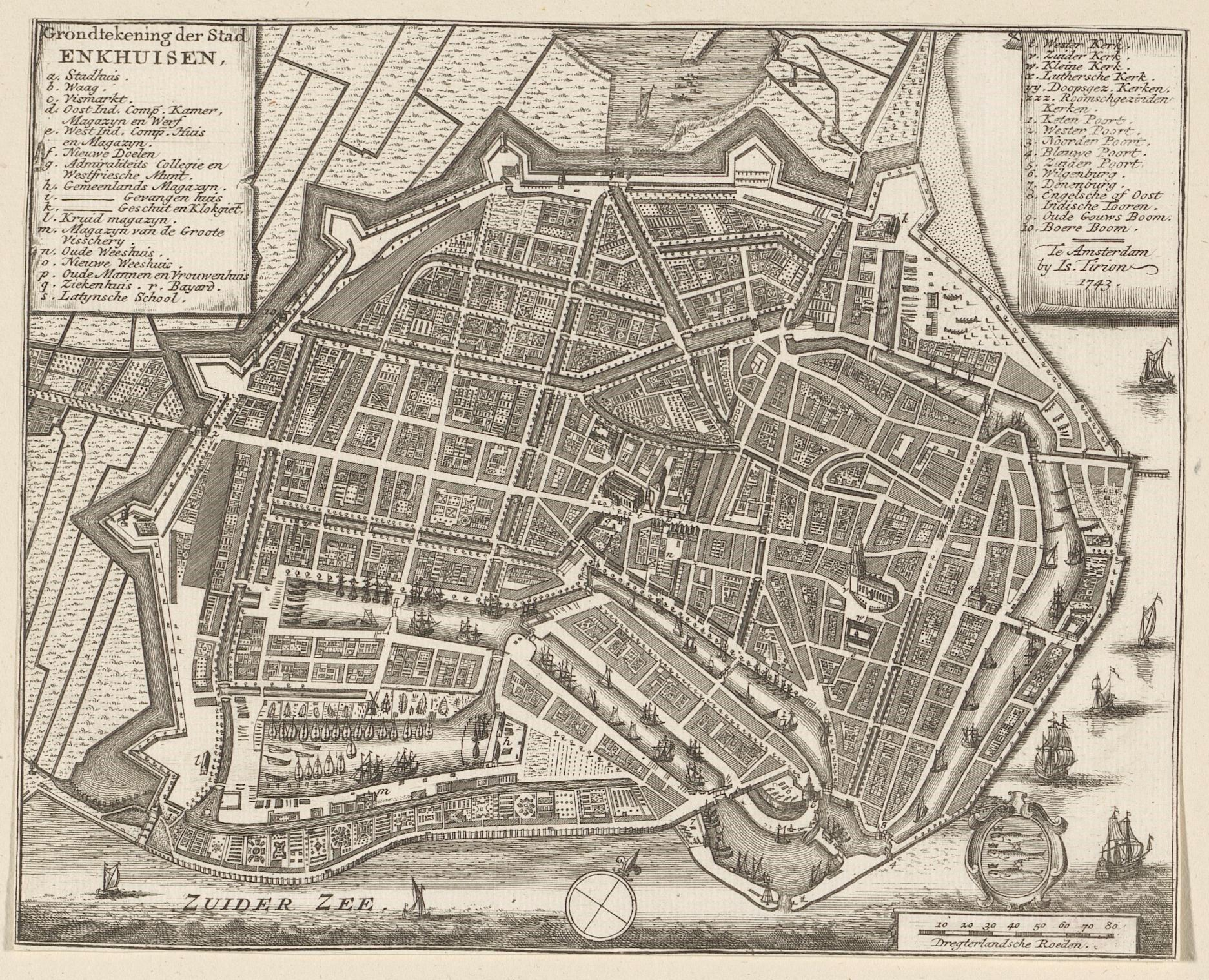
Map of Enkhuizen (1743)

The history of Enkhuizen spans from prehistoric times to the present, reflecting its long-standing regional importance in North Holland. Archaeological evidence indicates that the area was inhabited as early as the Neolithic and Bronze Ages, with early communities settling on elevated ridges near natural waterways. During the Middle Ages, Enkhuizen developed into a fortified town and was granted city rights in 1356. Its strategic location on the Zuiderzee positioned it as a key maritime center, and by the 16th century, it played an early role in the Dutch Revolt against Spanish rule.

In the Dutch Golden Age, Enkhuizen flourished as a major port, known for herring fishing, international trade, and its involvement with the Dutch East India Company (VOC). Although its prominence declined in the 18th century due to harbour silting and shifting trade routes, the city remained active through fishing and regional commerce. The 19th century brought renewed development through railway connections and notable social reforms, including early examples of planned social housing.

In the 20th century, Enkhuizen experienced the effects of German occupation and wartime bombing during World War II, followed by a period of reconstruction and urban expansion. In recent decades, the city has focused on heritage preservation, tourism, and economic diversification, emerging as a centre for seed production and agricultural innovation.

== Prehistory ==
The region of West Friesland was already inhabited during the Stone Age until around 2200 BCE, when rising sea levels and increased flooding led to the temporary abandonment of much of the area.

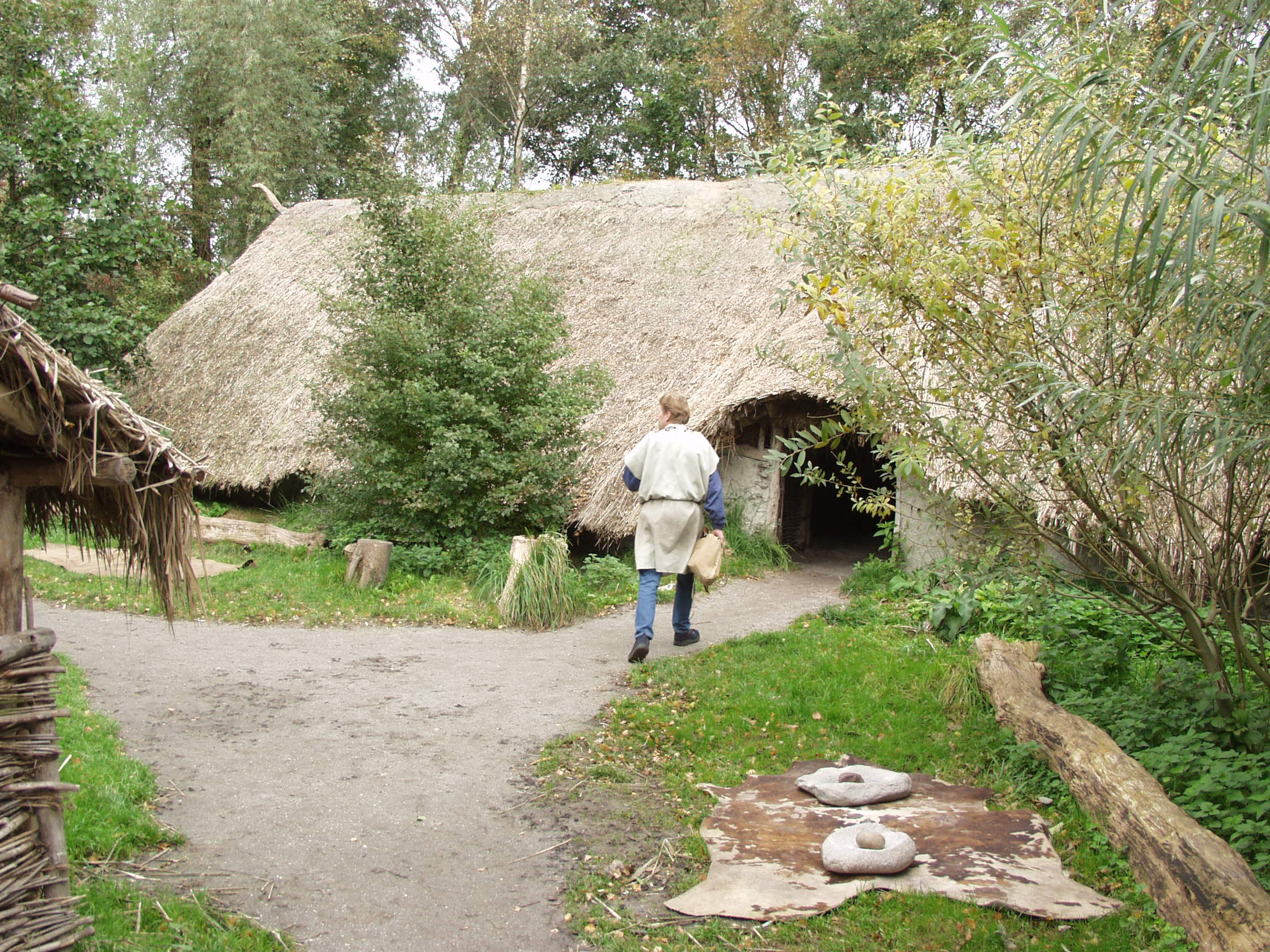
A Bronze Age farmhouse reconstruction at the Zuiderzee Museum in Enkhuizen.

The earliest direct evidence of settlement near present-day Enkhuizen dates to the Late Neolithic and Bronze Age. People settled on elevated sandy ridges, known as kreekruggen, which offered relative safety from flooding, fertile soils, and access to water routes. Excavations at the Enkhuizer Kadijken and Haling have revealed traces of Bronze Age activity, such as ditches and structures interpreted as house plots or enclosures, along with pottery, fish traps and animal bones. These suggest a landscape of small-scale farming communities, who combined agriculture with animal husbandry and fishing.

Several burial mounds have been discovered in Enkhuizen and the surrounding area.

== Middle Ages ==
The All Saints' Flood of 1170 caused widespread saltwater intrusion and destruction across West Friesland, including the area around Enkhuizen. In response, communities initiated large-scale water management efforts which led to the construction of the Westfriese Omringdijk. By the 13th century, this dyke enclosed and protected settlements such as Enkhuizen, allowing for more stable habitation and agricultural development. Its completion proved timely, as it helped shield the region from the St. Lucia's flood of 1287, which led to the creation of the Zuiderzee.

Around this period, Enkhuizen began to appear more clearly in historical records. The earliest known written mention dates to 1283, when the settlement was referred to as Enkus(e) in a document relating to the robbery of English merchants. In 1289, Count Floris V of Holland conquered West Friesland, including Enkhuizen. Although Christian institutions and parishes existed prior to his conquest, the process of Christianisation and the consolidation of secular authority accelerated under his rule. During the Middle Ages, Enkhuizen also fell under the religious jurisdiction of the Bishopric of Utrecht and was influenced by the Egmond Abbey, which played a role in the development of parishes and local infrastructure.

In the 14th century, the neighbouring village of Gommerskarspel gradually merged with Enkhuizen, forming a single settlement. This unified community was granted city rights in 1356 by Count William V of Holland, marking the formal beginning of Enkhuizen as an urban centre.

In 1421, the St. Elizabeth's Flood struck the eastern part of the Enkhuizen settlement outside the dikes, an area known as Oostdorp, submerging it beneath the expanding Zuiderzee. Following the flood, Albert I, Duke of Bavaria, granted the residents of Enkhuizen permission to dismantle the church of Oostdorp and rebuild it within the fortified town. The relocated church, known as the Zuiderkerk, still stands today.

In the 15th century, the nearby community of Stede Broec established its own harbour, Broekerhaven, in Bovenkarspel despite opposition from Enkhuizen, which sought to maintain control over regional shipping.

== Religious conflict and Dutch Revolt ==
In the 16th century, Enkhuizen was significantly affected by the religious and political unrest of the Eighty Years' War. Tensions between the Catholic Habsburg regime and emerging Protestant movements, particularly Calvinism, escalated throughout the Low Countries. The imposition of the Inquisition and the repressive policies of the Duke of Alba led to growing resistance.

Between 1568 and 1571, the Watergeuzen (Sea Beggars) made multiple unsuccessful attempts to seize the city. In response to these threats, Spanish stadtholder Maximilien de Hénin-Liétard (Count of Bossu) stationed warships near Enkhuizen in early 1572 to protect the Zuiderzee. At his request, the Spanish-aligned city burgomasters allowed troops into the city temporarily for military transit. This move sparked unrest among citizens wary of a potential occupation.

By early 1572, the broader impact of the Beeldenstorm elsewhere in the Netherlands had contributed to growing religious tension in Enkhuizen, even though no iconoclastic violence is known to have occurred in the city itself. The atmosphere of uncertainty and fear led some Protestant residents to flee to exile in Emden, and civic tensions rose as public sentiment increasingly turned against Spanish-aligned authorities. In May 1572, the Spanish-loyal schout was arrested by city officials. On 21 May, following the Capture of Brielle, Enkhuizen officially declared its support for the Prince of Orange, becoming one of the first cities in the northern Netherlands to join the revolt. In the months that followed, sectarian conflict deepened. In June 1572, five Catholic clerics were executed without trial in Enkhuizen, later referred to as the Martyrs of Alkmaar, for their opposition to the Reformation.

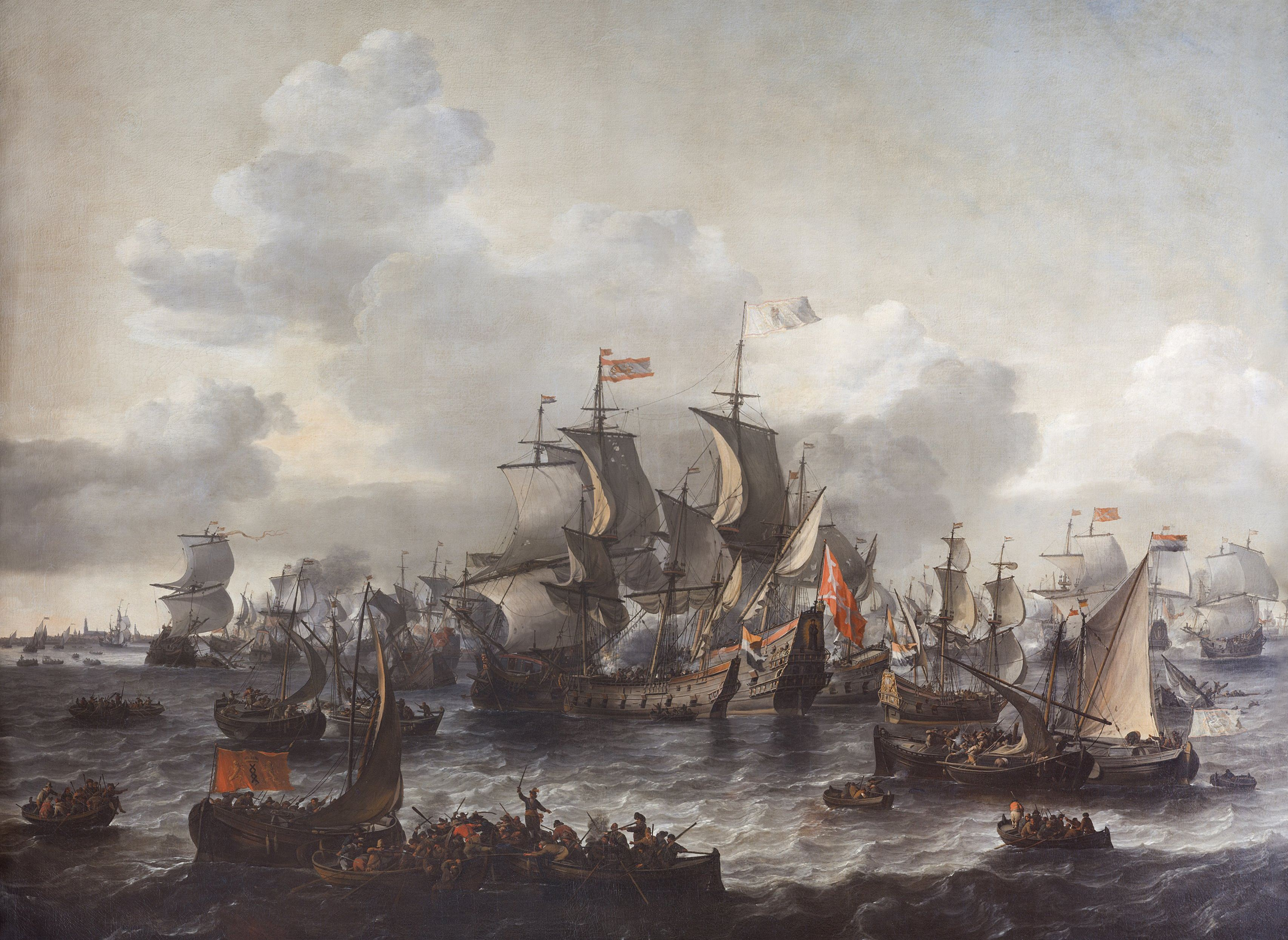
Battle on the Zuiderzee, by Jan Theunisz Blanckerhoff

Enkhuizen also played a key role in the naval campaign against Spanish forces. In October 1573, ships from Enkhuizen and Hoorn joined the Sea Beggars in confronting the Spanish fleet on the Zuiderzee. The confrontation culminated in the Battle on the Zuiderzee on 11 October 1573, where the rebel fleet defeated the Spanish under the command of the Count of Bossu. Several Spanish ships were captured, along with around 300 soldiers. The victory strengthened the rebel position in the region and solidified Enkhuizen’s status as a maritime base for the revolt.

In 2022, Enkhuizen marked the 450th anniversary of this event with a series of public commemorations and exhibitions highlighting its role in the Dutch Revolt.

== Dutch Golden Age (1585–1672) ==
Following its rebellion against Spanish rule during the Eighty Years’ War, Enkhuizen emerged in the early 17th century as one of the most prosperous cities in the Dutch Republic. Strategically located on the Zuiderzee, it rapidly expanded into a powerful hub of commerce, maritime industry, and global trade.

In 1602, Enkhuizen became one of the six chambers of the Dutch East India Company (VOC). The city established warehouses, shipyards, and administrative buildings to support the VOC’s Asian trade. The Peperhuis, a VOC warehouse constructed in this period, still stands as a testament to this activity. Enkhuizen also had ties to the Dutch West India Company (WIC), active in Atlantic trade including routes associated with the transatlantic slave trade.

Enkhuizen's role in colonial trade has drawn attention due to its connections with slavery. One individual, Cornelis Valentijn, was enslaved in Asia and brought to Enkhuizen in the 18th century through the Cape of Good Hope before eventually gaining his freedom.

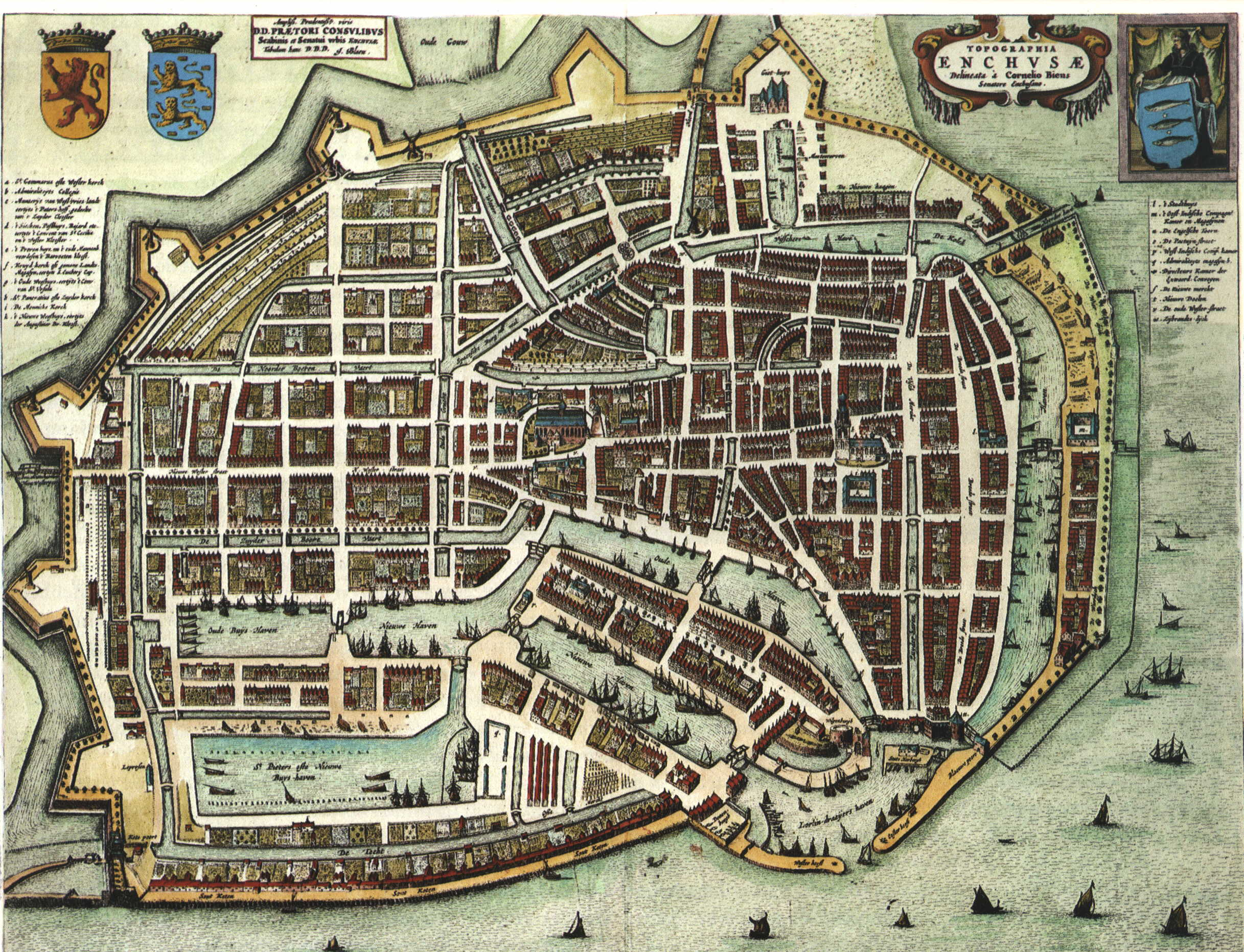
Map of Enkhuizen (1652)

The city also played a notable role in early global finance. In 1606, the Enkhuizen chamber issued a VOC share that is now recognised as the oldest known stock certificate in the world. Enkhuizen’s trade-based economy supported a wide range of industries, including shipbuilding, sailmaking, and tanning. Archaeological evidence has revealed a 17th-century tannery, highlighting the diversity of local craftsmanship during the city's peak. The Paalkistrecht, a toll right on moored ships, also provided a consistent revenue stream for civic projects .

Prominent explorers from Enkhuizen contributed to Dutch maritime expansion. Jan Huygen van Linschoten published detailed navigational routes to Asia based on Portuguese sources, while Dirck Gerritsz Pomp took part in early expeditions to the Strait of Magellan and possibly reached Antarctic waters.

Urban development in Enkhuizen accelerated during the Dutch Golden Age, driven by trade and maritime prosperity. The growing population led to the construction of new neighbourhoods and civic buildings, while public institutions such as almshouses and hospitals expanded with support from merchant wealth and city funds.

=== Fortifications ===
To protect its expanding harbour and commercial interests, Enkhuizen constructed an extensive system of fortifications from the late 16th century onwards. These included a moat, seven angular bastions, and fortified city gates. The fortifications followed a bastioned trace design, typical of early modern Dutch military engineering.

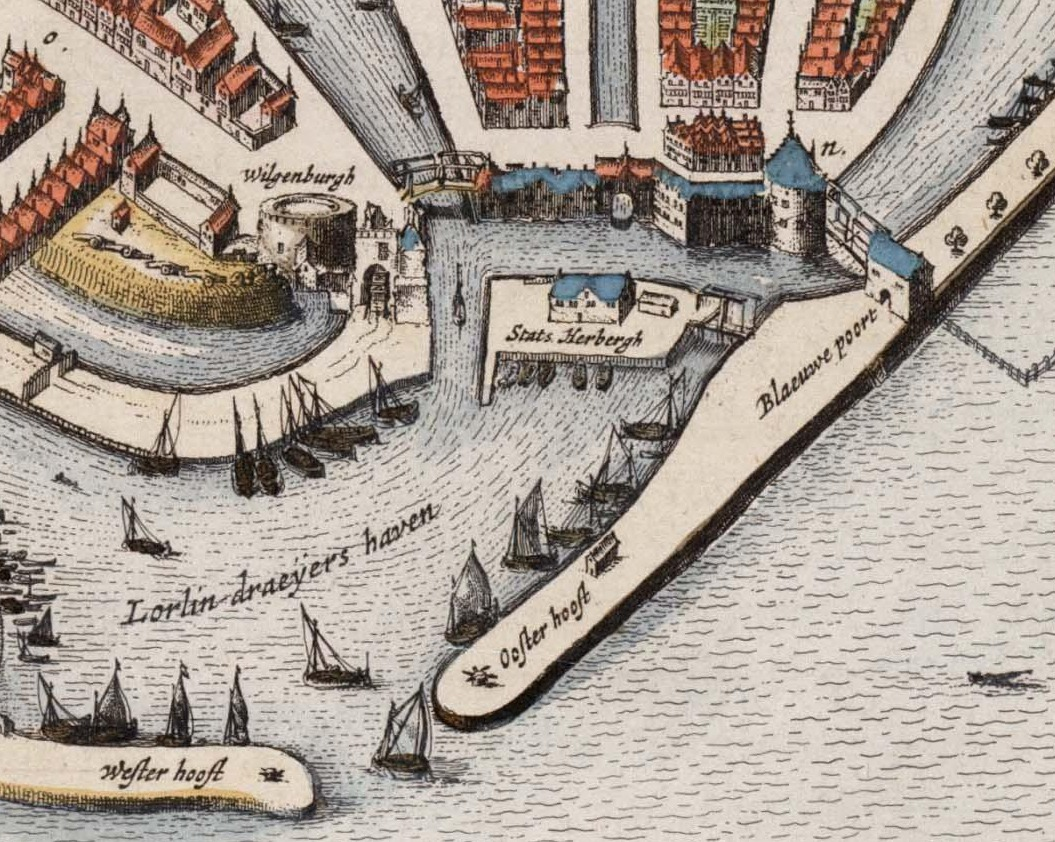
Detailed map of harbour entrance, with the Engelse Toren and the original ground floor of the Drommedaris (1649).

The Engelse Toren (English Tower), dating back to 1396, was one of the city’s earlier towers and later served various administrative purposes, including temporary use by the Dutch East India Company (VOC). It was demolished in the 19th century. Archaeological work has revealed further remnants of the defensive circuit, including sections of the original walls and a former water gate, providing evidence of the town's once-continuous perimeter defences .

Key surviving elements include the Drommedaris, a defensive tower and gate at the harbour (built ca. 1540), and the Koepoort, a formal city gate constructed in 1654 along the western land route.

Today, several bastions and stretches of the defensive embankments are still visible, particularly along the northern and western edges of the historic city. These features are collectively designated as a national monument.

=== Painters of the Golden Age ===
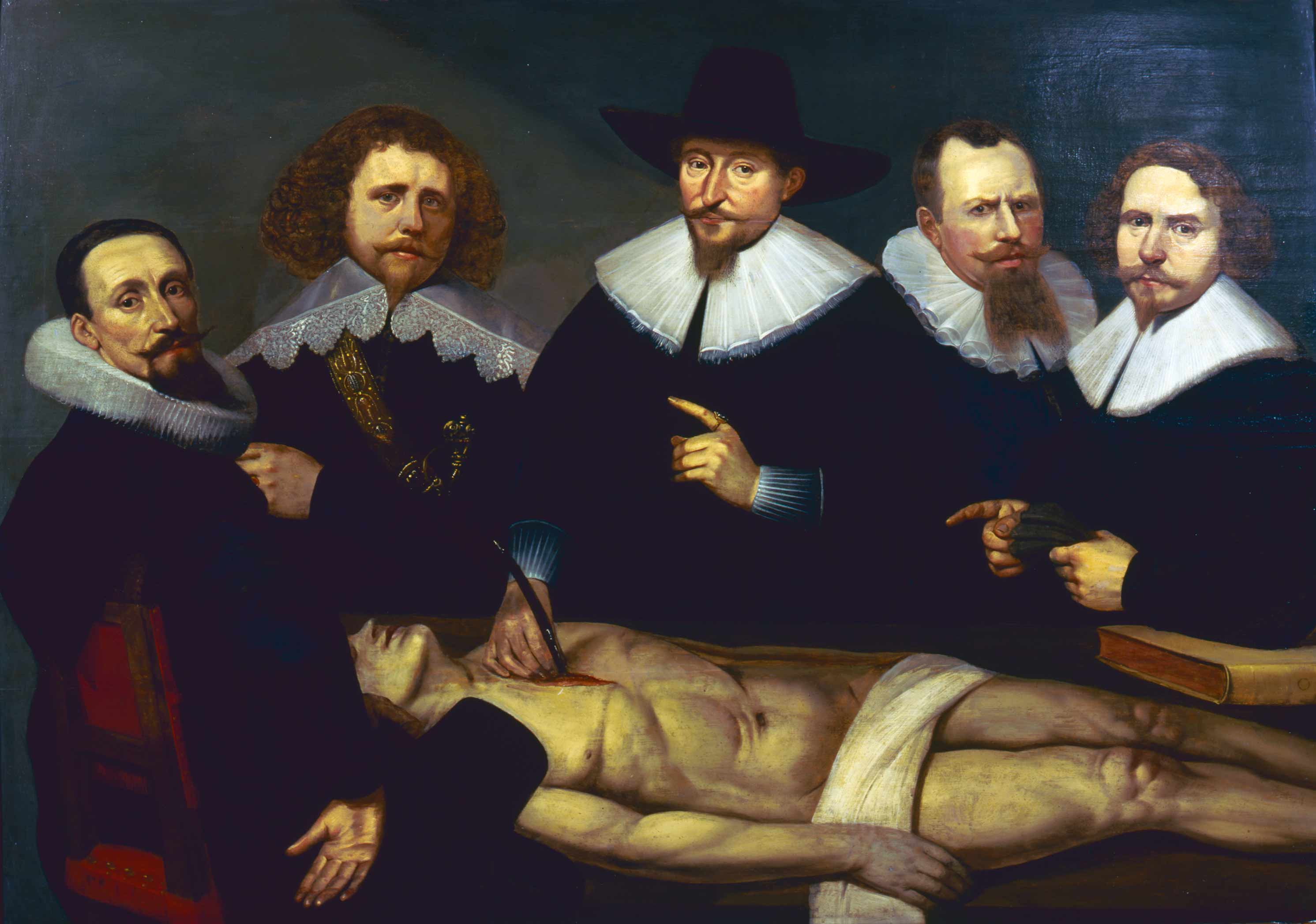
Anatomy lesson of Dr. Zacheus de Jager, by Christiaan Coevershoff

Enkhuizen’s prosperity during the Dutch Golden Age fostered a rich cultural environment that supported several painters of regional and national importance. Paulus Potter (1625–1654), known for his animal scenes, was born in Enkhuizen and became one of the period's most acclaimed painters. Though he spent much of his career elsewhere, his early years in Enkhuizen are part of the city’s cultural heritage.

Jan Claesz portrayed prominent local families, while Christiaan Coevershoff produced institutional works, including an anatomical group portrait. Herman Doncker, who also worked in Haarlem and Edam, painted numerous Enkhuizers.

Maria de Grebber, a lesser-known female painter, lived in Enkhuizen during the early 17th century and is known to have painted family portraits, including works depicting her brother-in-law, a local priest.

== Decline and modernisation ==
In the 18th century, Enkhuizen entered a period of economic and demographic decline. The silting of the harbour made it increasingly difficult for large ships to access the port, and maritime trade routes shifted to cities with better connectivity, such as Amsterdam. The decline of the Dutch East India Company (VOC), which formally dissolved in 1799, further reduced Enkhuizen’s commercial importance. Enkhuizen gradually became a quiet provincial town, sustained by fishing and limited regional trade.

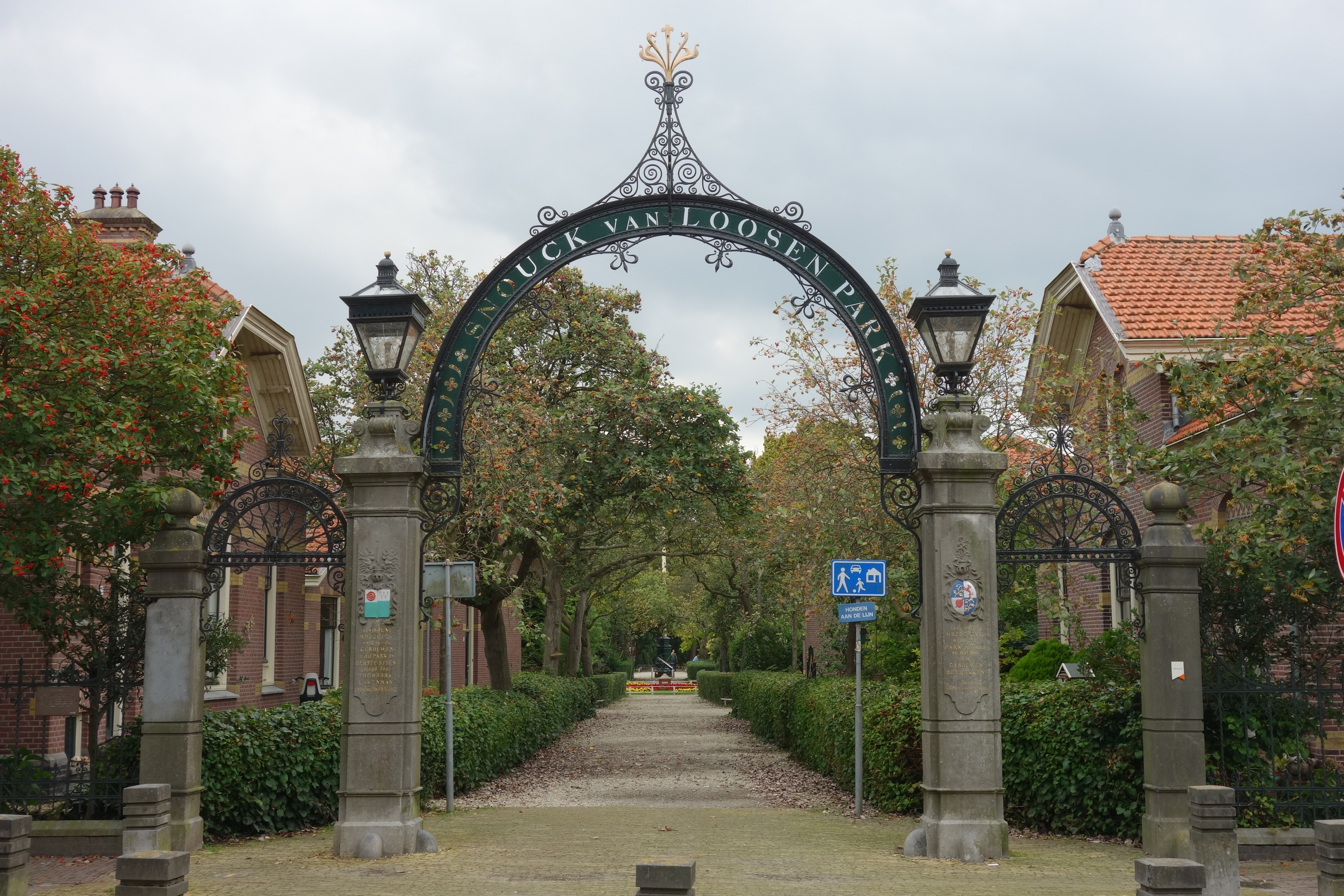
Entrance to the Snouck van Loosenpark, a social housing project inspired by the garden city.

Despite these setbacks, the 19th century brought significant social and infrastructural renewal. One of the most influential figures of this period was Margaretha Maria Snouck van Loosen (1807–1885), heiress to a wealthy merchant family. Known for her philanthropy, she invested her fortune in improving living conditions for the working class in Enkhuizen. Among her most notable legacies was the establishment of the Snouck van Loosenpark, a social housing project developed between 1894 and 1897. Inspired by garden city principles, the park comprised fifty workers’ homes set around a communal green space, along with a supervisor's residence. It is one of the earliest examples of planned social housing in the Netherlands and remains a national monument.

Snouck van Loosen’s contributions extended beyond housing. She funded the Snouck van Loosenziekenhuis, a modern hospital for the time, and supported education and charitable initiatives for the city's less privileged populations and built a church. Her former residence, the Snouck van Loosenhuis, is also a listed historical monument. The hospital was demolished in the 21st century.

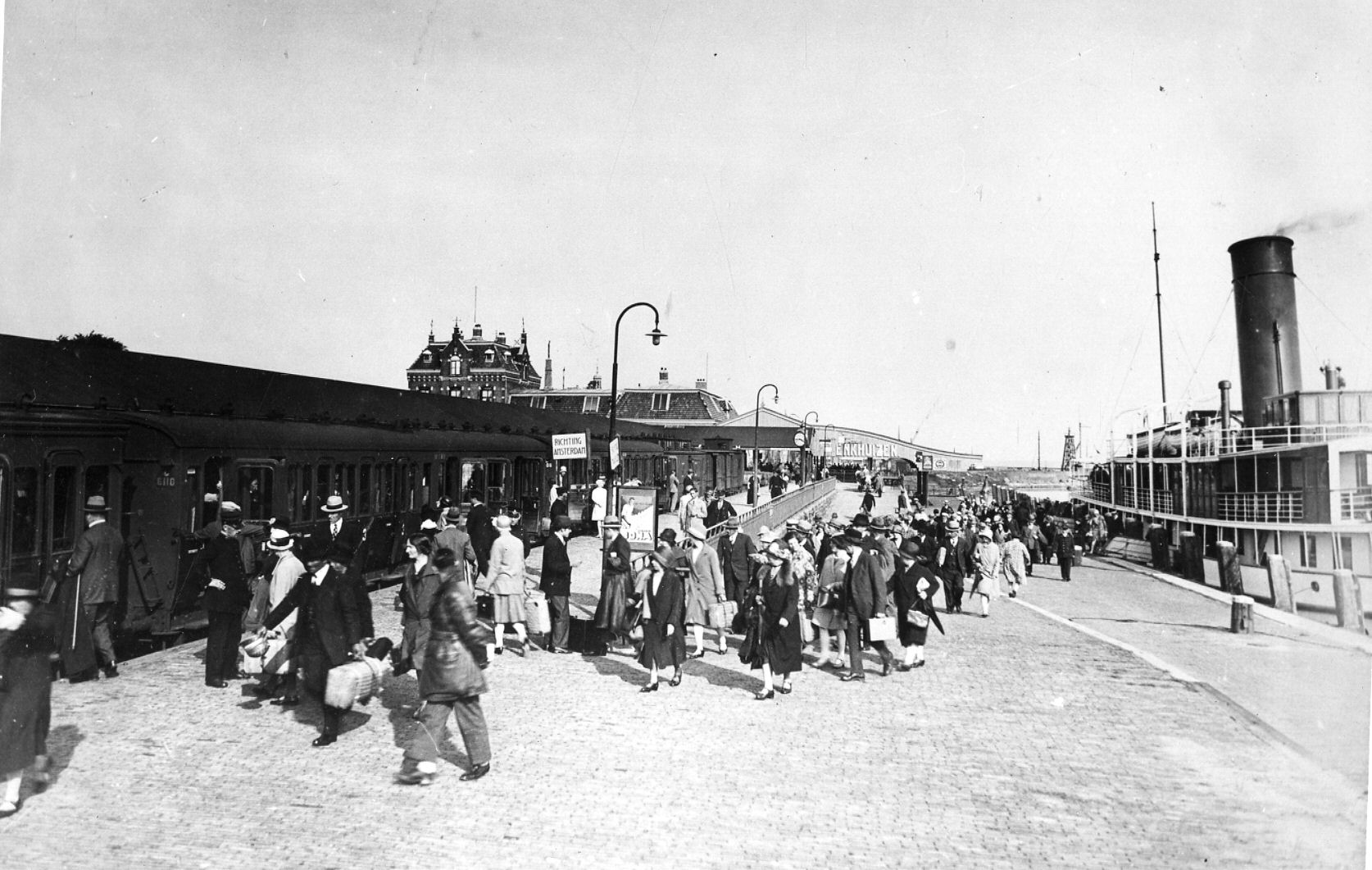
Travellers transferring from the ferry to the train at Enkhuizen railway station (1920-1930).

During the same century, Enkhuizen was also incorporated into the national railway network. The construction of the Zaandam–Enkhuizen railway line, completed in 1885, provided a vital economic link to the rest of the country. The city’s monumental terminus railway station was built to accommodate growing passenger and freight traffic and became the terminal for ferry connections across the Zuiderzee (now IJsselmeer) to Stavoren. The line was part of a broader phase of state-sponsored rail expansion in the Netherlands and led to the demolition of the Ketenboom city gate.

Proposals for even more ambitious infrastructural projects, such as an early concept of the Afsluitdijk connecting Enkhuizen to Stavoren, had already been considered as early as 1834, though they would not materialise until the 20th century.

== 20th century ==
In the early 20th century, Enkhuizen adapted to shifting social and political currents, including the growing women’s rights movement. On 3 November 1907, Aletta Jacobs gave a public lecture at the Kaasmarkt, which led to the formation of a local branch of the Vereeniging voor Vrouwenkiesrecht (Association for Women’s Suffrage). Among its leading members was Anne Charlotte Christine van Roojen, who became chairwoman of the Enkhuizen branch. Beyond activism, van Roojen also contributed to local social reform by modernising women's education. In 1929, she supported the establishment of a new domestic sciences school.

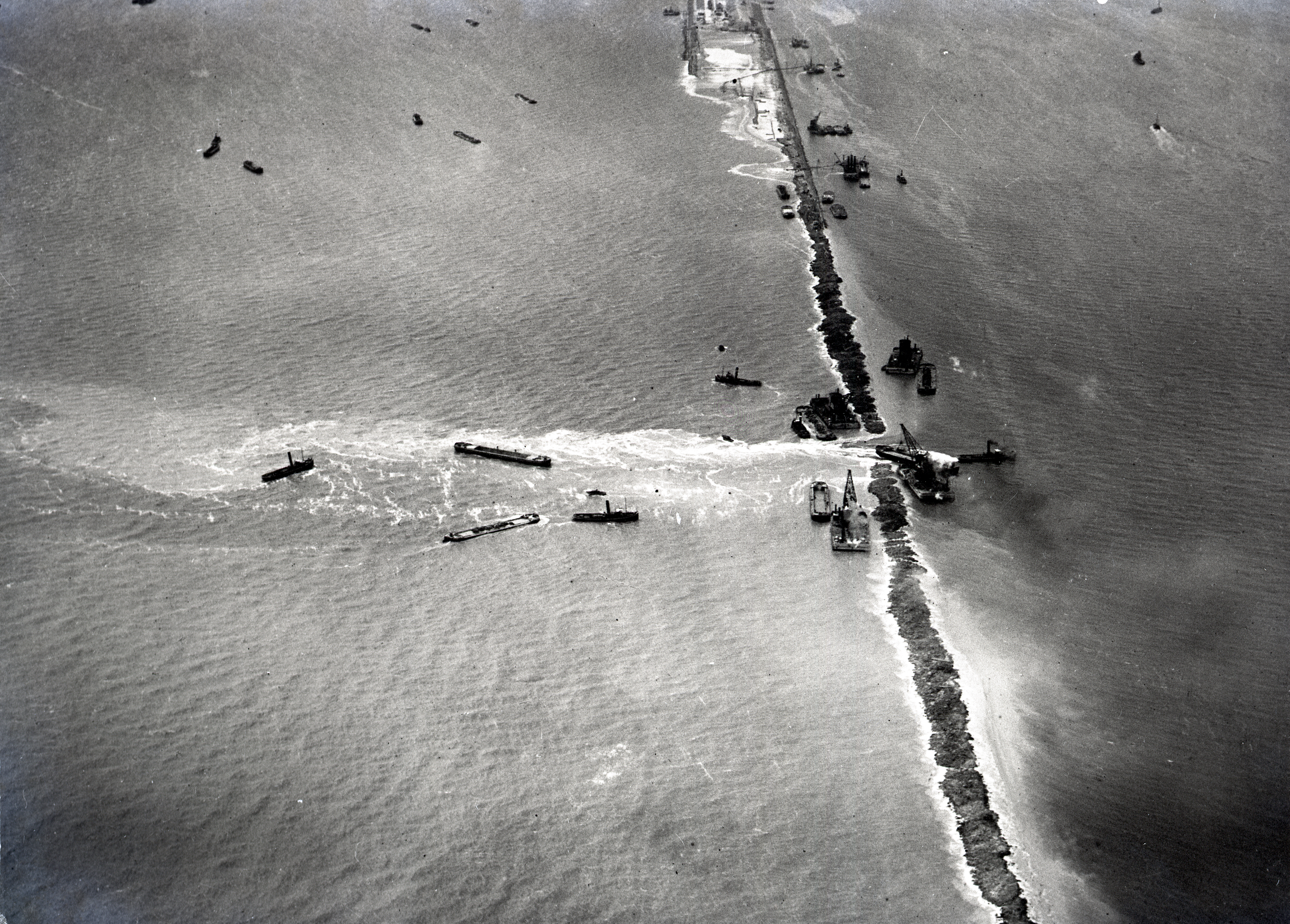
Closure of the Zuiderzee during the Afsluitdijk construction (1932).

Following the construction of the Afsluitdijk as part of the Zuiderzee Works in 1932, the former Zuiderzee gradually transformed into the freshwater lake now known as the IJsselmeer. This transition, completed within several years, had significant consequences for the regional fishing industry. Enkhuizen, known as the Haringstad ("herring city"), too, was affected. With the decline of saltwater fishing, the local economy was forced to adapt to freshwater fishing.

=== World War II ===
During the German occupation of the Netherlands from May 1940, Enkhuizen came under Nazi control. Although the municipal administration remained in place, the impact of the war was deeply felt in local life and society.[1]

Resistance activities gradually developed. One notable example was the involvement of employees at the seed company Sluis & Groots, who used company facilities to hide fugitives, distribute illegal newspapers, and forge identity papers in support of the resistance. A notable figure was Ro Snijders, a civil servant and future mayor of Enkhuizen, who also participated in resistance work and was arrested by the Gestapo. He survived imprisonment and contributed to post-war reconstruction.

The town’s small Jewish community, though vulnerable, was treated somewhat differently than in many other Dutch cities. Notably, the mayor refused to cooperate with the mandated expulsion of Jewish children from public schools. When deportation to Amsterdam was ordered in 1943, most of Enkhuizen’s Jewish population went into hiding. As a result, a relatively larger number survived the war compared to national trends. Of the city's 54 Jewish residents, 52 survived the war.

During the Dutch famine of 1944–1945, also known as the Hongerwinter, severe food shortages struck the region. Starving children from urban areas were taken in by Enkhuizen residents, some temporarily housed in boats in the harbour, before being sent north to Friesland for care.

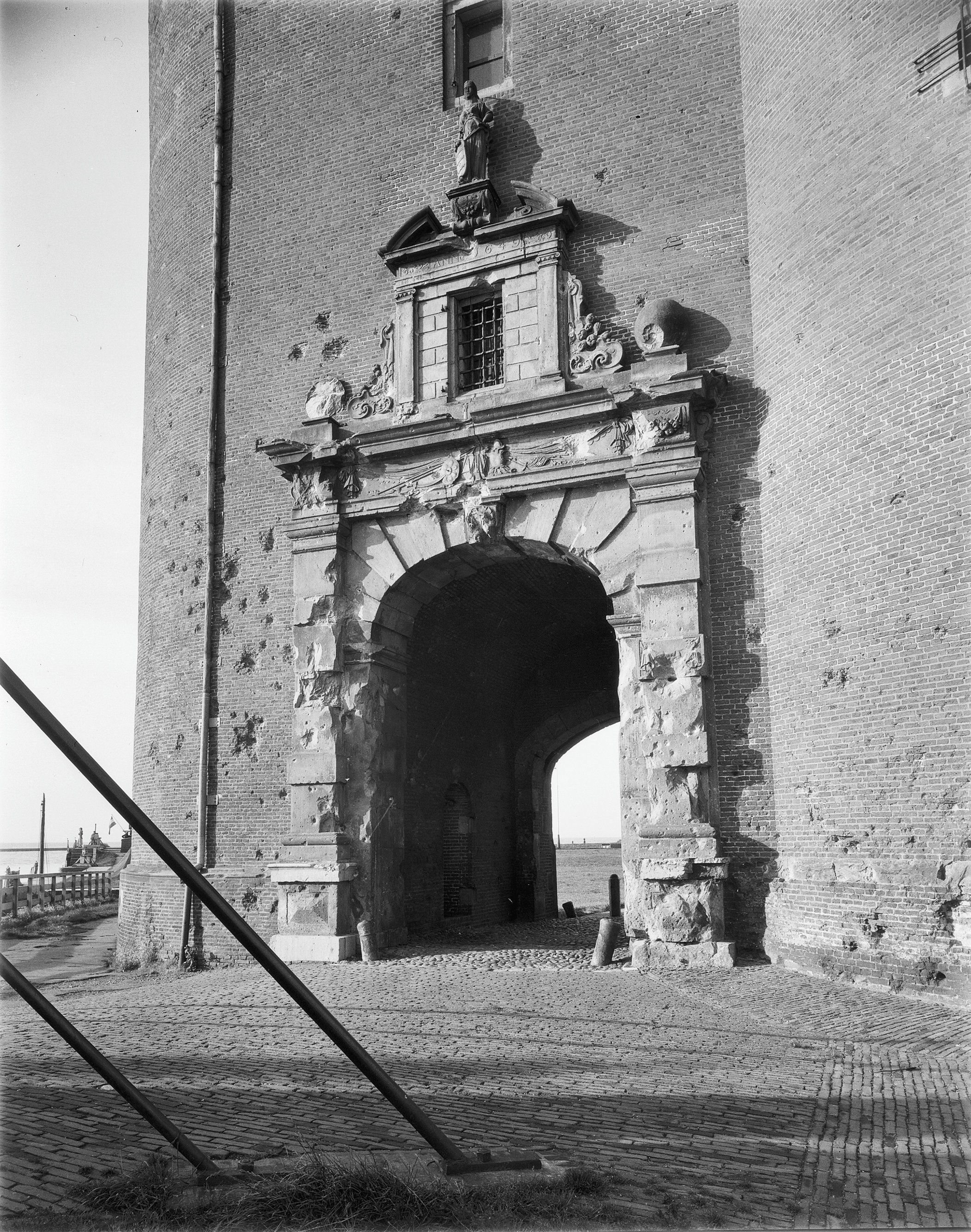
Damage to the Drommedaris following the bombing of Enkhuizen.

Enkhuizen suffered heavily during Allied air raids in the final months of the war. On 6 September 1940, a bombing caused damage in the city and resulted in the death of one civilian. A far more destructive bombing took place on 15 March 1945, targeting German boats situated at the wharfs in the harbour. However, the bombs hit the surrounding neighbourhood, which resulted in 24 civilian casualties, 70 wounded, and widespread damage. Those who died in the bombings, along with Allied airmen who crashed nearby, are buried in the Enkhuizen General Cemetery, which also includes Commonwealth war graves.

Two war memorials in the city commemorate its victims: the Stedemaagd Monument, unveiled in 1949, honours civilians killed during the war, while the Indië Monument remembers local soldiers and civilians who died during and after the war in the former Dutch East Indies.

=== Post-war period ===
Following World War II, Enkhuizen faced reconstruction challenges, particularly in housing. In 1949, the municipality approved Plan Noord, the town’s first major urban expansion beyond the historic city walls. The project led to the construction of hundreds of homes throughout the 1950s.

In the post-war decades, Enkhuizen increasingly oriented its economy toward cultural heritage and tourism. A major development was the establishment of the Zuiderzee Museum, which opened in 1950. The museum expanded in 1983 with an open-air section featuring historic buildings from across the former Zuiderzee region. Tourism further expanded with the establishment of Sprookjeswonderland in 1973, a family amusement park.

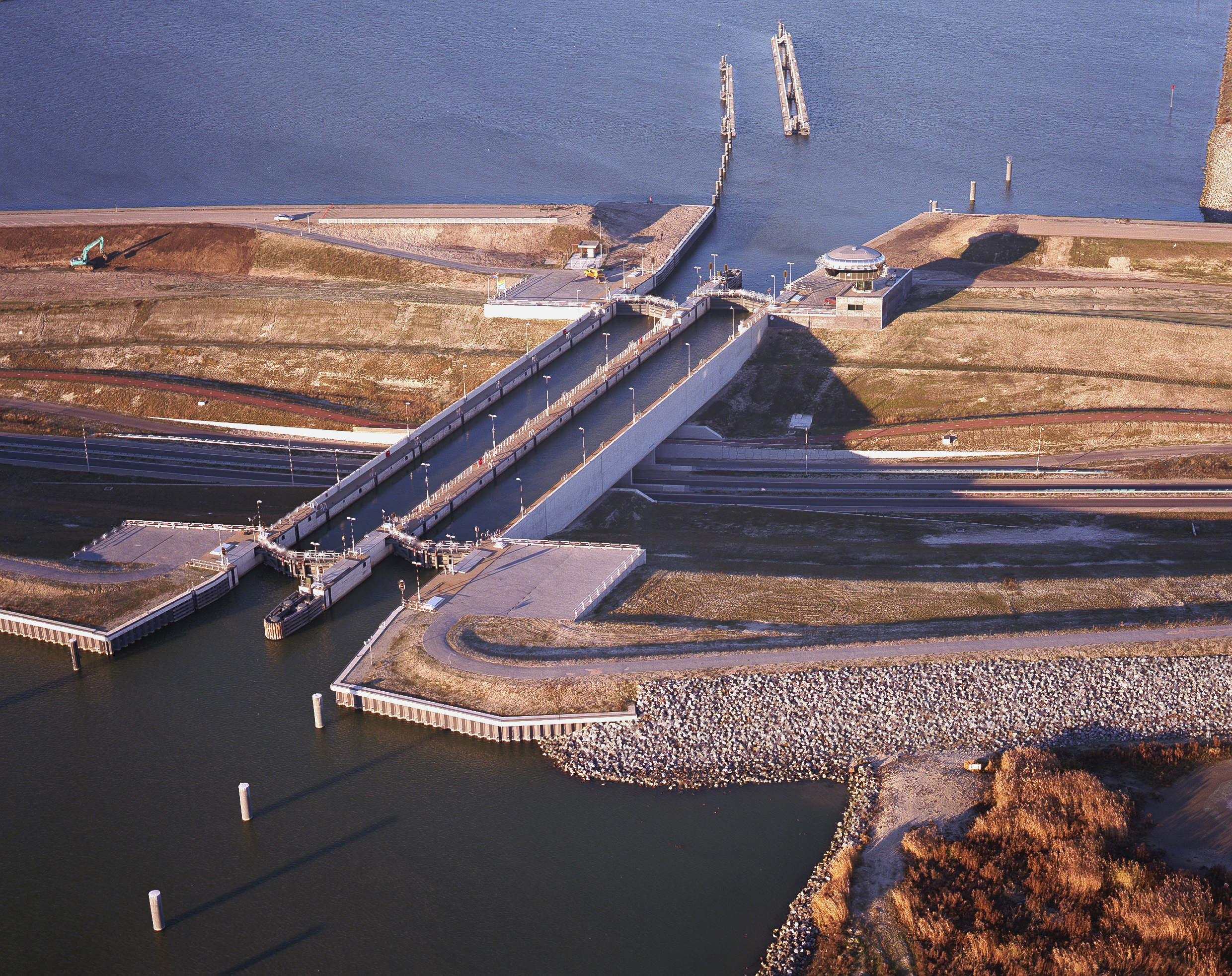
The Krabbersgat naviduct on the Houtribdijk, near Enkhuizen (2003).

Enkhuizen's infrastructure also developed significantly during this period. Between 1963 and 1976, the Houtribdijk was constructed, linking Enkhuizen to Lelystad in the newly reclaimed Flevoland across the IJsselmeer. This 27-kilometre dam includes sluices and a naviduct, allowing road and boat traffic to pass simultaneously.

== 21st century ==
In the 21st century, Enkhuizen has experienced steady transformation through urban development, economic innovation, and shifts in tourism and retail. Residential expansion continued with the development of Kadijken, while the Enkhuizerzand project aims to enhance waterfront recreation and improve access to the IJsselmeer.

Economically, Enkhuizen emerged as a key center in the international seed industry. The city plays a leading role in Seed Valley, a regional cluster of companies specialising in plant breeding and biotechnology. Anchored by firms like Enza Zaden, which originated in Enkhuizen, and Syngenta, the sector has grown into a major employer and exporter, reinforcing the city's global profile in agricultural innovation.

Traditional maritime activities remain present, with several shipyards continuing to serve the boating community on the IJsselmeer. The city’s retail landscape faced challenges during the 2010s and early 2020s, particularly due to the rise of online shopping and the impact of the COVID‑19 pandemic, which led to temporary store closures.

== See also ==
- Naval history of the Netherlands
- Dutch colonial empire
