= Bombing of Enkhuizen =

- Part of World War II
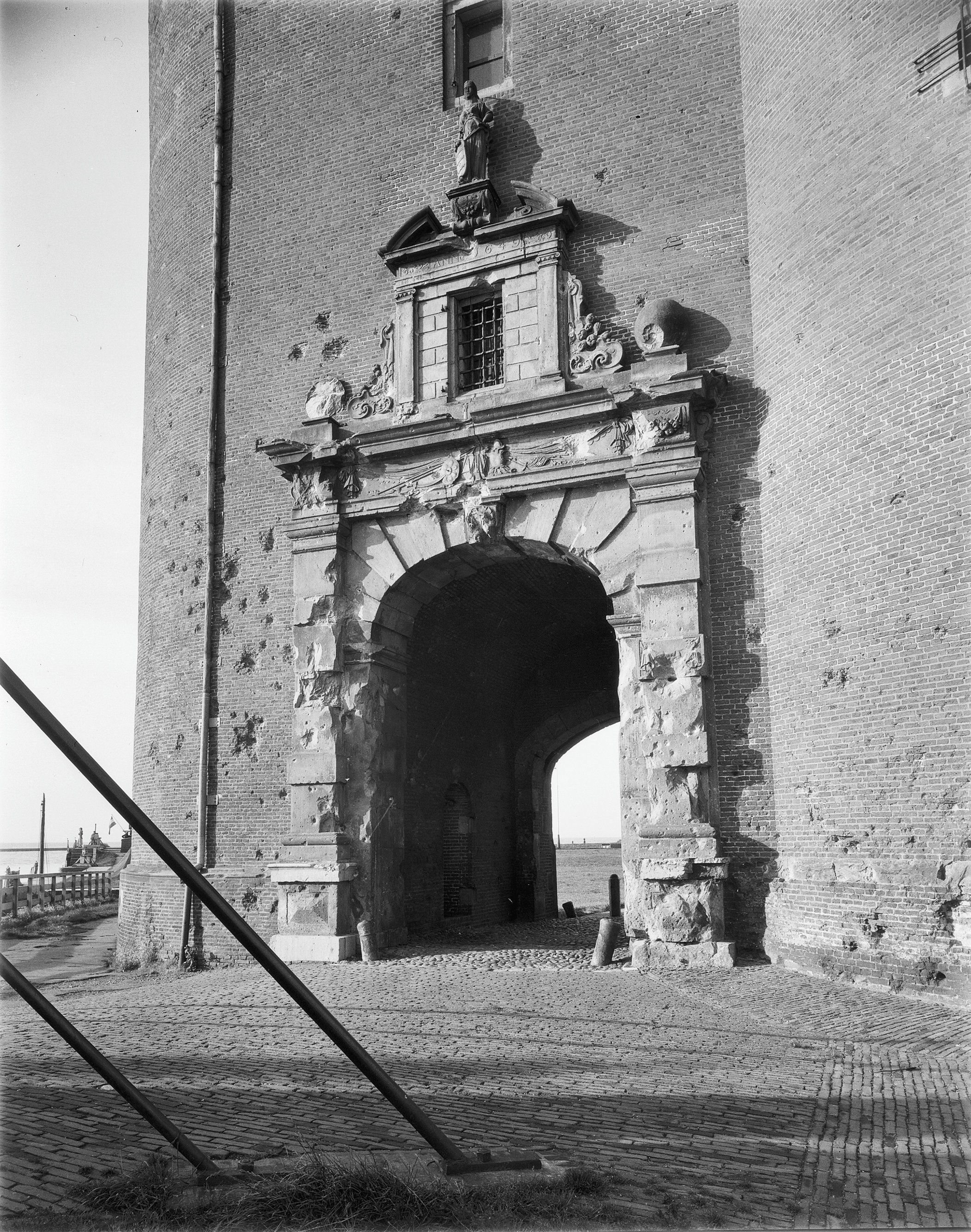
- Damage to the Drommedaris following the bombing.
Date	March 15, 1945
Location	Enkhuizen, Netherlands

Belligerents
United Kingdom	Germany

Units involved
Fighter Command: No. 308 Wing	

Strength
4 Typhoon or Supermarine Spitfire IX bombers	

Casualties and losses
- 24 civilian deaths

The bombing of Enkhuizen took place on 15 March 1945, when four RAF Spitfires targeted German Wasserschutzpolizei boats in the city’s port. The bombs missed their targets, striking the neighbourhood instead. The raid, which lasted about two minutes, killed 24 civilians, wounded many, and caused extensive damage to the harbour district.

== Motive ==
According to a British report, the motive for the bombing was the threat created by the presence of twelve Wasserschutzpolizei boats moored in the port of the city. These had been stationed there by the Nazis to prevent residents from fleeing to the liberated side of IJsselmeer. There were fears that the boats could be used for a German attack on the liberated east of the Netherlands.

== Bombing ==
At approximately 15:30 on Sunday, March 15, four Spitfires flew over Enkhuizen at a low altitude from the west with the German boats as their target. Though the bombs covered much of the area, the boats in the dry dock were not hit. The planes then flew to the IJsselmeer and returned for another attack, which was unsuccessful. During the bombing, one of the British planes was hit and crashed near Katwoude. The pilot was rescued by the Dutch resistance, and taken into hiding for the remainder of the war.

The bombardment lasted two minutes, during which the aircraft dropped 1.7 tons of bombs on the port of Enkhuizen.

== Aftermath ==
Instead of the dry docks, the bombs hit the surrounding neighbourhood, which resulted in 24 civilian casualties, many wounded, and widespread damage. The bombing led to the collapse of the Drommedaris bridge and the building damaged. Other buildings around the port, especially the carpenter, sustained heavy damage.

Those who died in the bombings, along with Allied airmen who crashed nearby, are buried in the Enkhuizen General Cemetery, which also includes Commonwealth war graves.
