= Christiaan Coevershoff =

Dutch painter

- Born: 1595; Groningen
- Died: 1659 (aged 63–64); The Hague

Christiaan Coevershoff or Cornelis Coeuershoff (1595–1659) was a Dutch Golden Age painter from Groningen.

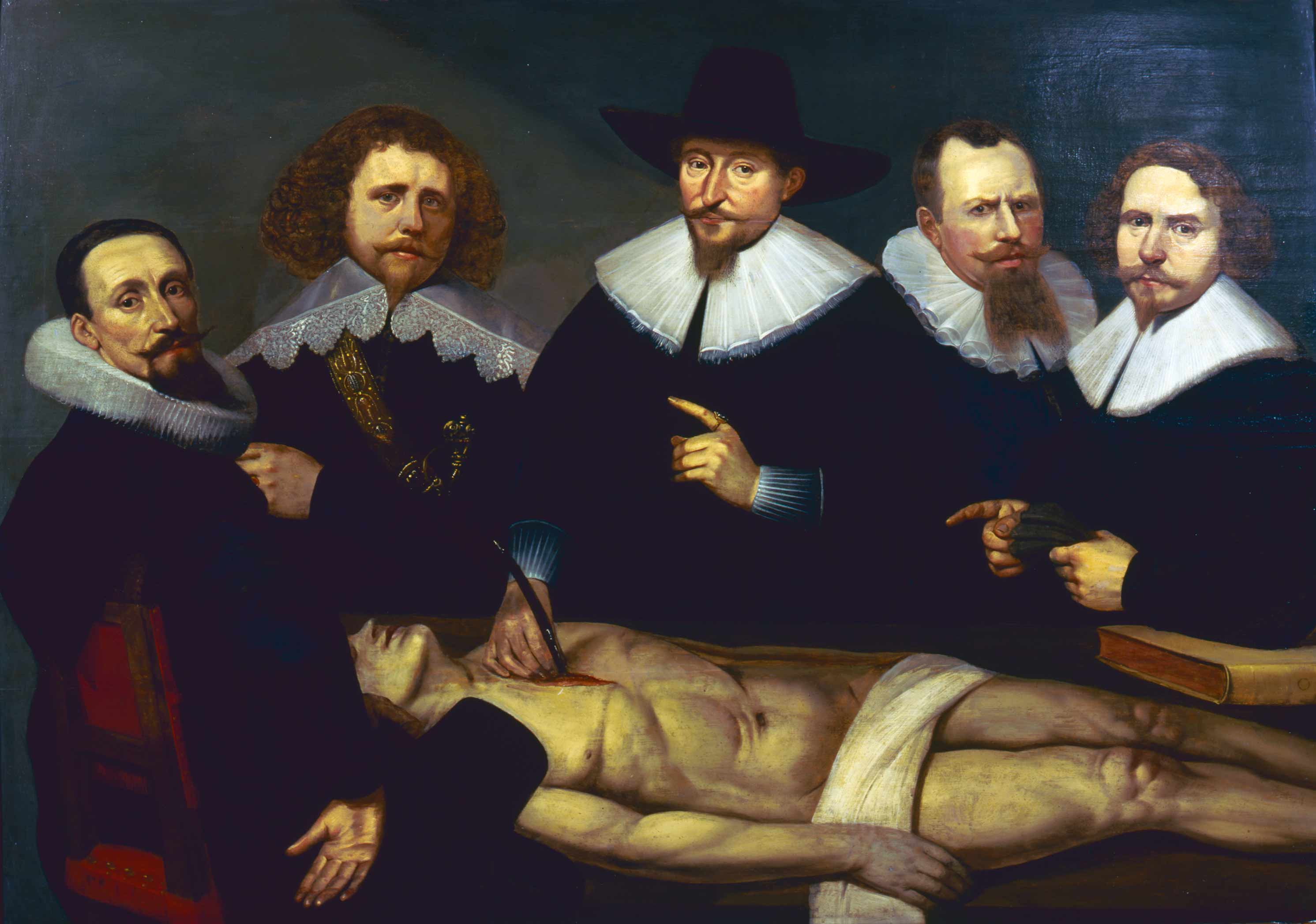
Anatomy lesson of Dr. Zacheus de Jager, 1640

Coevershoff was born in Groningen but moved to Amsterdam where he trained as a painter. He was rediscovered by Isa van Eeghen who researched his Anatomy lesson of Dr. Zacheus de Jager. His work shows that he was influenced by Hendrik Goltzius and Cornelis van Haarlem. Besides Amsterdam and Enkhuizen he is known for working in The Hague, where he was one of the founders of the Confrerie Pictura in 1656.

Coevershoff died in The Hague.
