= Herman Doncker =

Dutch Golden Age painter

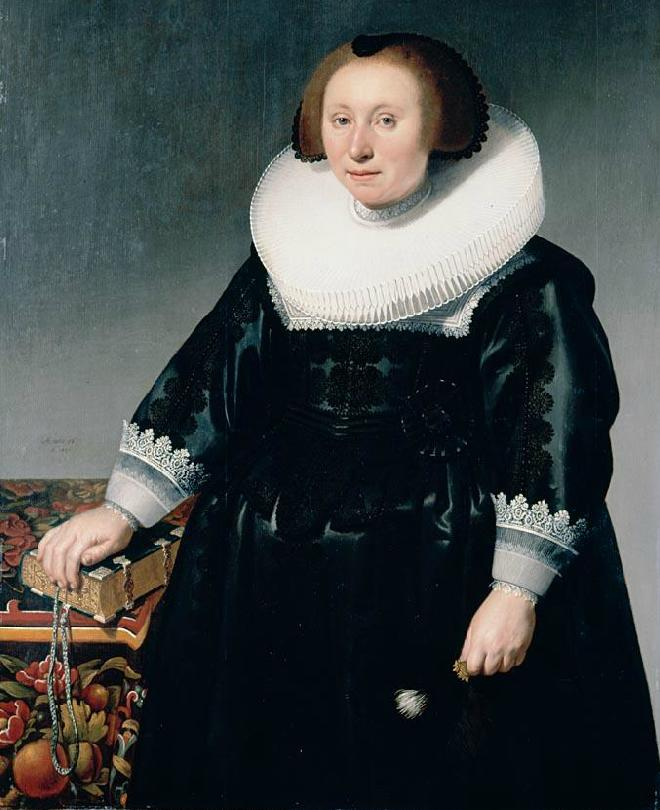
Portrait of an unknown lady, 1630

Herman Meindertsz. Doncker (c. 1600 – c. 1666), was a Dutch Golden Age painter.

He worked in Haarlem during the years 1633–1640, and signed his works 'H. Doncker', or 'HD'. He dated portraits from 1627–1640. He painted some works for the council of Enkhuizen.
