= Zuiderkerk (Enkhuizen) =

Church in Enkhuizen, Netherlands

Zuider- or Sint-Pancraskerk
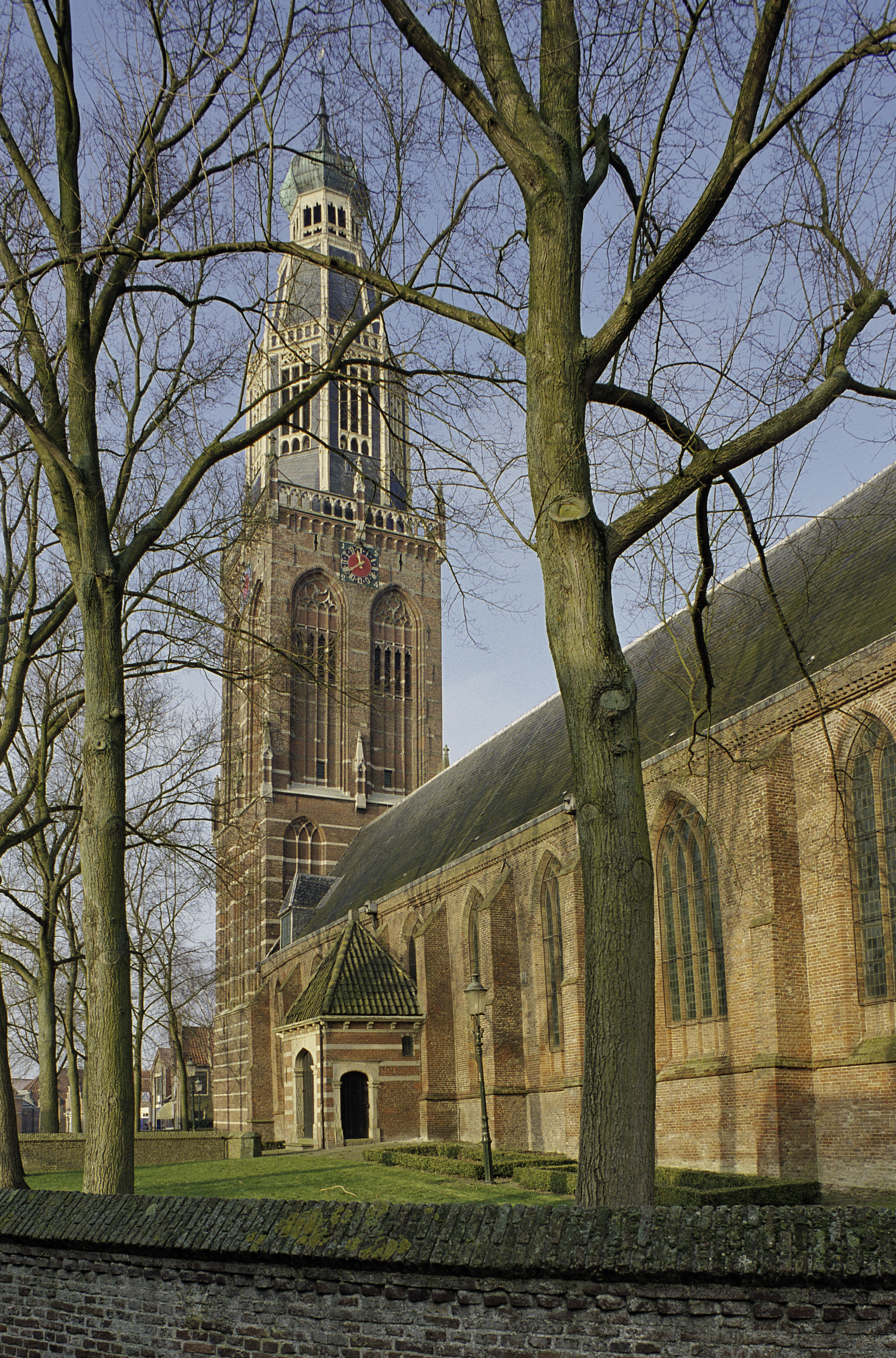
- Zuiderkerk, from the southeast
- Zuider- or Sint-Pancraskerk
- 52°42′13″N 5°17′33″E
- Denomination: Protestant Church in the Netherlands
- Previous denomination: Roman-Catholic church

History
- Founded: 1423

The Zuiderkerk, also called Sint-Pancraskerk is a late Gothic hall church in Enkhuizen, in the Netherlands, currently used by the Protestant Church in the Netherlands.

== History ==
In 1422 the citizens of Enkhuizen received permission from John III, Duke of Bavaria, to tear down the old church of Oostdorp, a village outside the Westfriese Omringdijk (the dyke that protects the area) that had flooded. The new church was dedicated to Pancras of Rome, and building commenced in 1422 or 1423 in a patch of reed. It was reported that the building site had to be raised considerably, and that the walls were as high as the foundation walls were deep. It was mostly finished by 1458; the upper part of the 75-meter tall tower was finished in 1524, but by 1595 the tower was leaning six or seven feet and had to be set straight. Church and tower still dominate the cityscape. The tower is owned by the city of Enkhuizen and was restored and renovated in 1992.

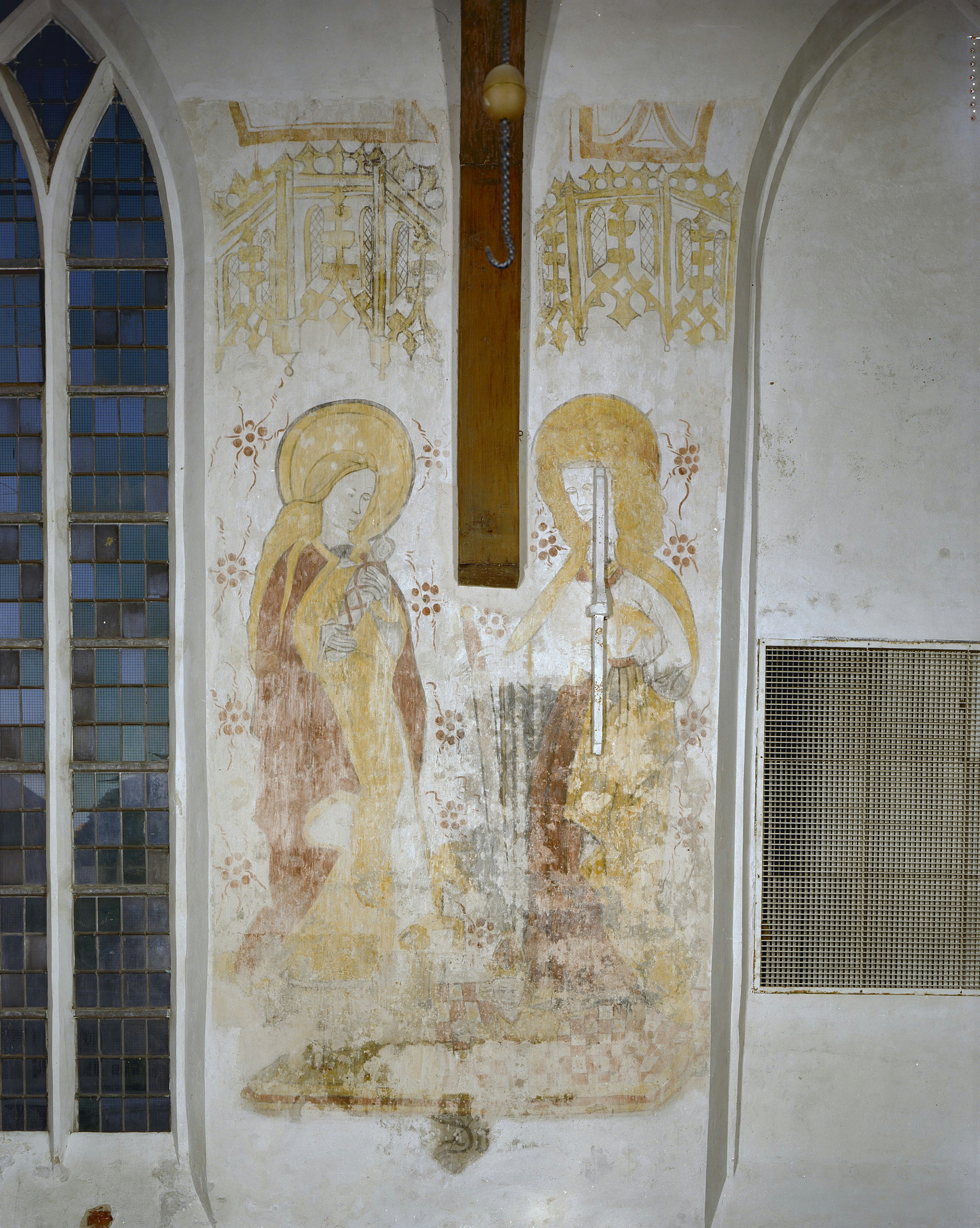
Wall painting

One of the church's more notable preachers was Cornelis Cooltuyn, known as the "father of the Dutch Reformation". He became pastor of the Zuiderkerk in 1555, when Balthazar Platander, still loyal to the Roman-Catholic church, was pastor of the nearby Westerkerk. Cooltuyn's was the larger congregation, but his orthodoxy was questioned and in 1557 he was forced to leave Enkhuizen for Alkmaar.

Plans for a reorganization of part of the church were presented in 2012, and in 2014 the expansion was done; it included the reorganization of the space by the Chapel of the Cross, on the north side of the church, and the addition of spaces including a day care and a kitchen.

In 2024, the church was to receive E16,500 in subsidies from the province North Holland for restorations.

== Paintings ==
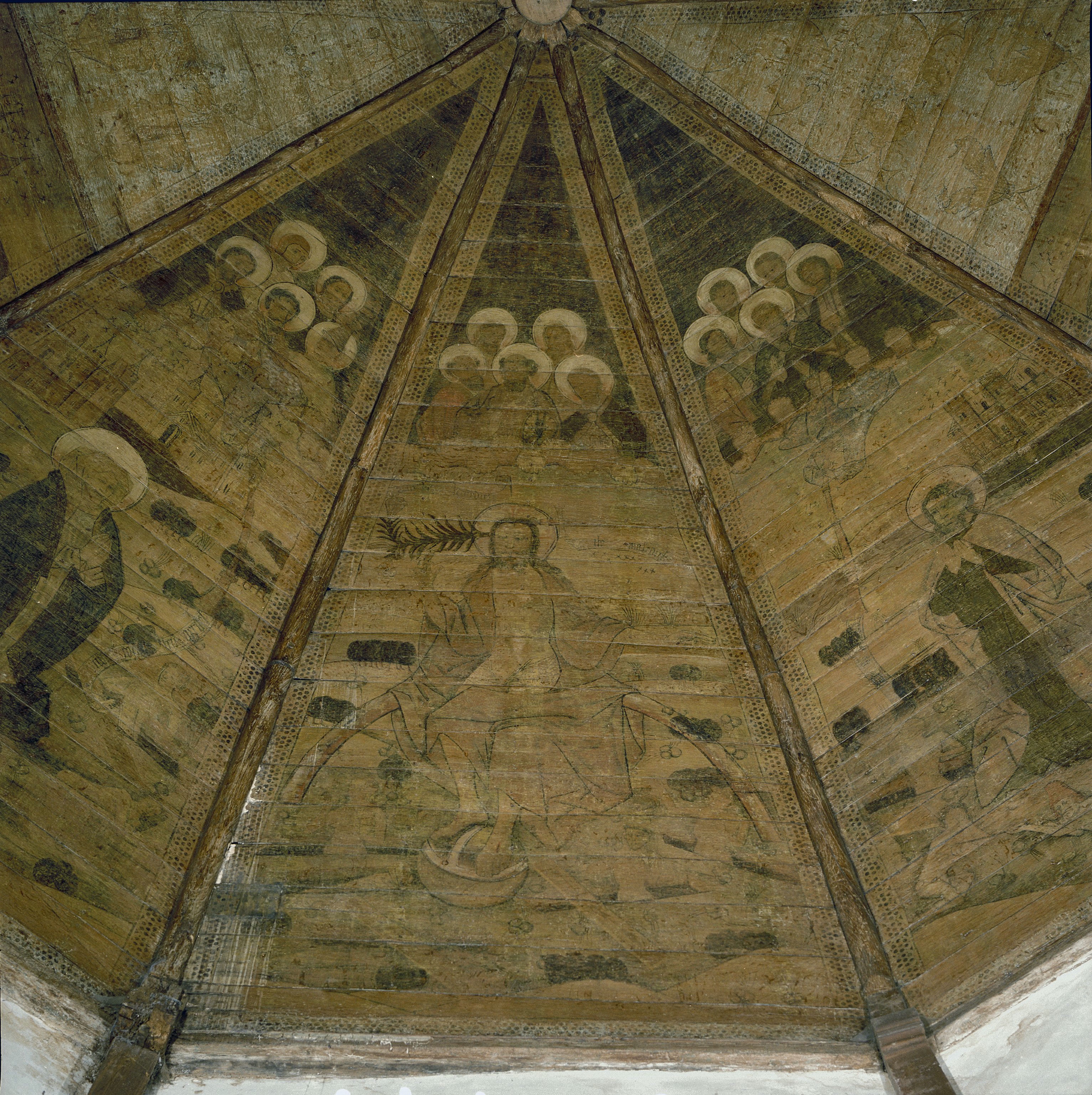
Biblical scene on the vault

Biblical scenes were painted on the vaults in 1484, but after the Reformation they were painted over, in 1609, when the church had been taken over by Protestants. The paintings were uncovered in the 20th century.

== Pipe organ ==
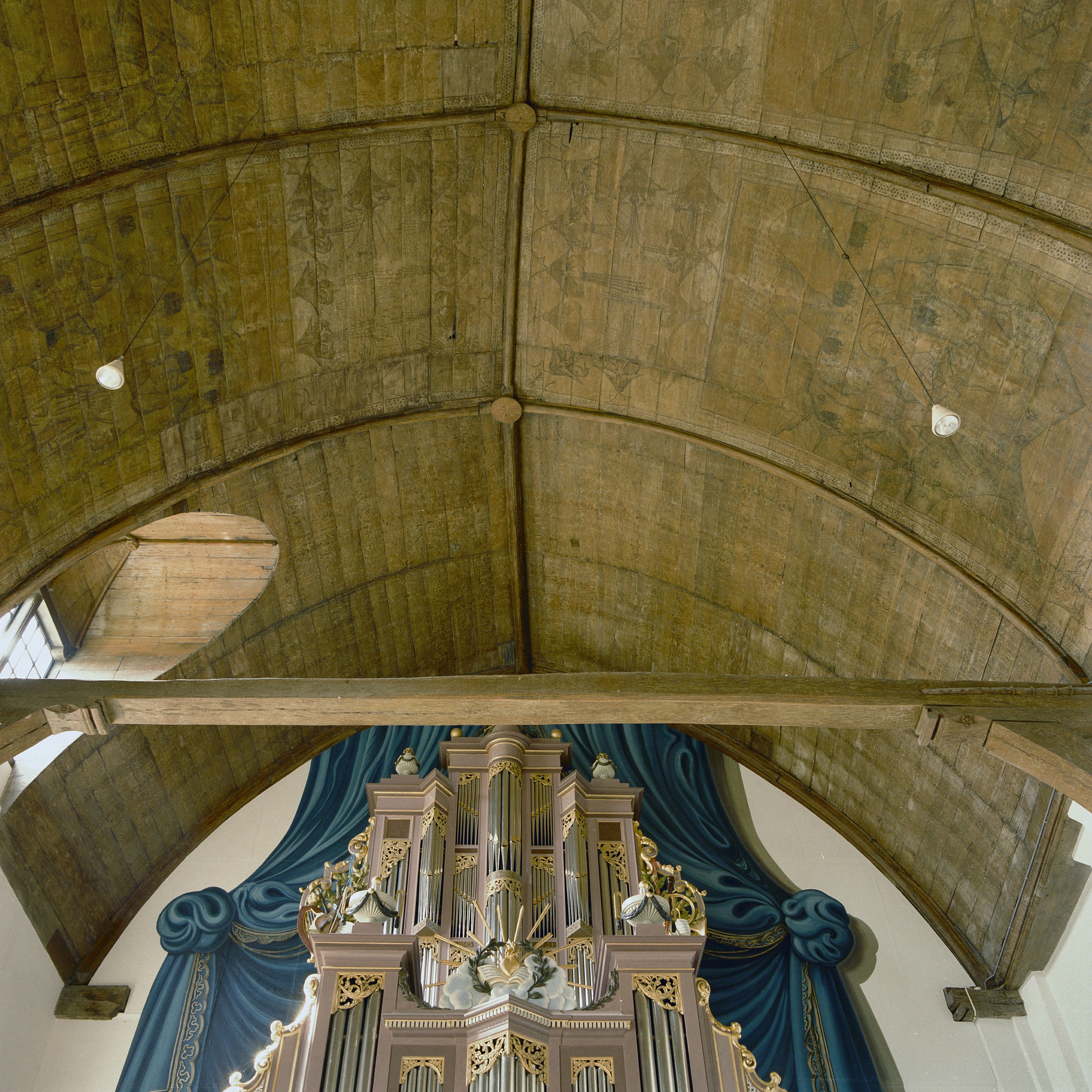
Interior

The organ's oldest parts (fragments of pipes and some of the registers) date from the 16th century, and indicate that at that time there was already an organ present. Work was done on the organ in 1593, and in 1621 it was expanded and changed significantly, and the casing dates from that year as well. The three-register pedal board was built in 1688 by Johannes Duyschot. In 1737 the casing was expanded by Pieter de Nicolo. Organ builder Heinrich Hermann Freytag was in charge of an extensive renovation in 1799. The organ was restored between 1988 and 1990 by Flentrop in Zaandam, which restored the organ to its 1799 condition.

== Church bells ==
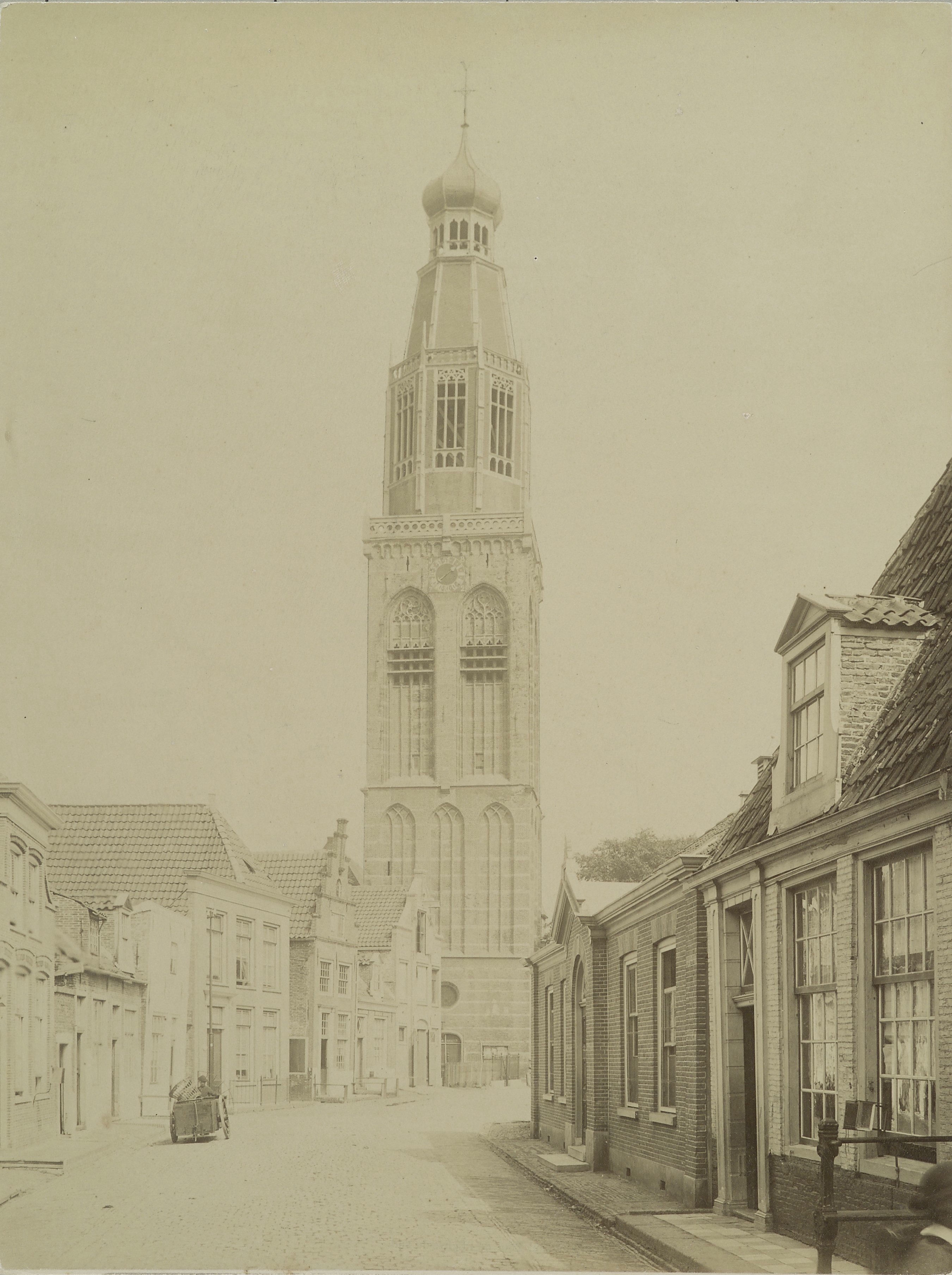
Zuidertoren ca. 1900, from the Torenstraat

The two church bells are tuned C^{0} and A^{1}. The largest, the C, was made by Geert van Wou in 1509, and its inscription reads, SALVATOR IS MYN NAEM * MYN GHELUIT SY GODE BEQUAEM * GERHARDUS DE WOU ME FECIT ANNO DOMINI MCCCCCIX ("Salvator is my name; may my sound please the Lord"). Originally cast for the city's Westerkerk, it was placed in the Zuiderkerk in 1653, and is connected to the carillon. The smaller bell, the A, was made by Pieter and François Hemony, and is inscribed BENEDICAT TERRA DNM. LAUDET ET SUPEREXALTET EUM IN SAECULA F&P HEMONY ME FECIT Ao. 1648 ("O let the Earth bless the Lord: let it praise him, and magnify him for ever", Benedicite). Until 1936 this bell alerted citizens in case of fire.

=== Carillon ===
The church's carillon was also constructed by the Hemony brothers, and consisted of 52 bells; since then bells have been replaced and added onto. The tuning system is the meantone temperament, which was usual in the 17th century. Of the current 54 bells around 20 date from before 1800. In the beginning of the 20th century a new system to operate the carillon was installed by Royal Eijsbouts bell foundry, which had a keyboard that allowed for more expressive playing with less effort.
