= Drommedaris =

Coordinates: 52.7007°N 5.2930°E

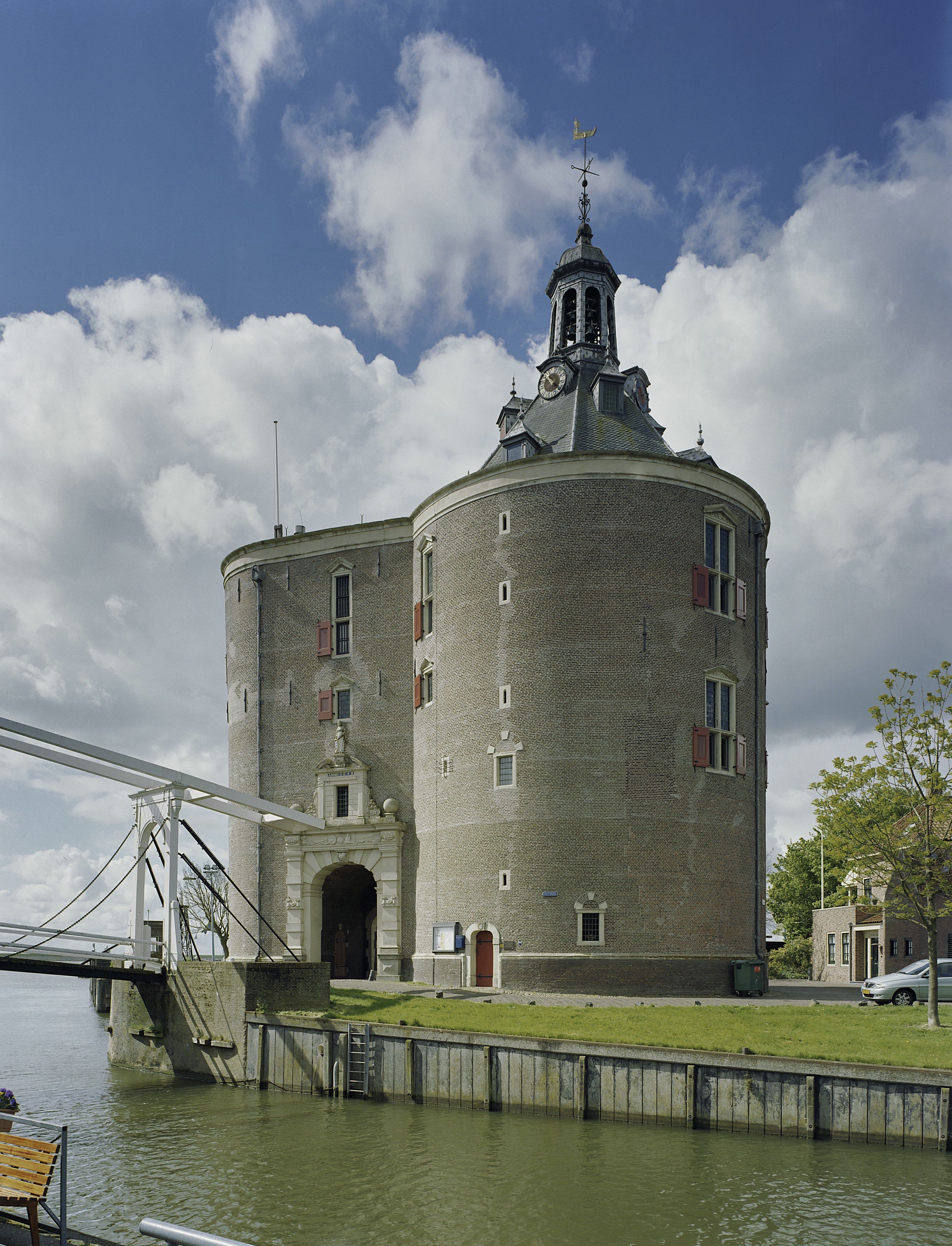
Drommedaris, Enkhuizen with the bridge in 2018

The Drommedaris is the southern gateway of the Dutch city Enkhuizen. It is the best known building in Enkhuizen.

== Origin ==
The building was erected as a defense work at the entrance to the Old Harbor, and was originally on the Westfriesian dike; this ran from the north; over the Breedstraat along to the Zuiderdijk. The stretch of dike near the Drommedaris was later excavated for the construction of the new haven. The artillery cellar and the room on the ground floor in the building date from 1540 and were the original building. Both rooms contain cannon holes along the walls in niches where there were cannons that could cover the harbors. The upper room has a rib vault. Above the building on the roof was a structure containing prison cells that can still be found on the first floor in the current building. So the bottom of the first floor was the roof of the original building. Above the gate is a cell for those condemned to death, in which oak wooded dates and sometimes poems are carved. Outside above the entrance to this gate, the weapon of the Emperor was carved out of white stone with the text below: "Blessed is the City and highly praised, who prays for war in times of peace." In a wooden bell chair on the roof a small bell hung to ring for announce of closing the gate.

The old name of the building is Zuiderpoort or Ketenpoort and later also Wilgenburg (for the stronghold to which the tower belonged). The name Ketenpoort refers to the salt works (zoutketen) south of the city along the Zuiderdijk, which could be reached via this gate. There seawater from the North sea was evaporated to obtain the salt where herring was preserved with. The name Drommedaris or Domburg was first used in the 19th century.

== Renovation ==
The building was renovated to its present appearance after the Eighty Years' War with Spain. Construction lasted from 1649–1657. Over the centuries the building has been used to store gunpowder and house prisoners and guards. It also served as an excise office, spinning/weaving mill, and telegraph office (under the gate). The first Zuiderzee Museum exhibition was held in the building in the summer of 1949.

The building was seriously damaged in a bombing raid near the end of World War II. The gate on the city side was riddled with bomb fragments. See a picture in the gallery

Around 1960, the Drommedaris housed a student center complete with a ground-floor bar. Students, including the Dutch Princess (later Queen Beatrix of Orange), slept in the prison cells in the attic. Later a café-restaurant was opened on the first floor. The space below, like the second floor, became a small auditorium that was used for concerts, theater performances, and art exhibits. Nowadays, the building is used only as a cultural center. There is an elevator to go upstairs for disabled people

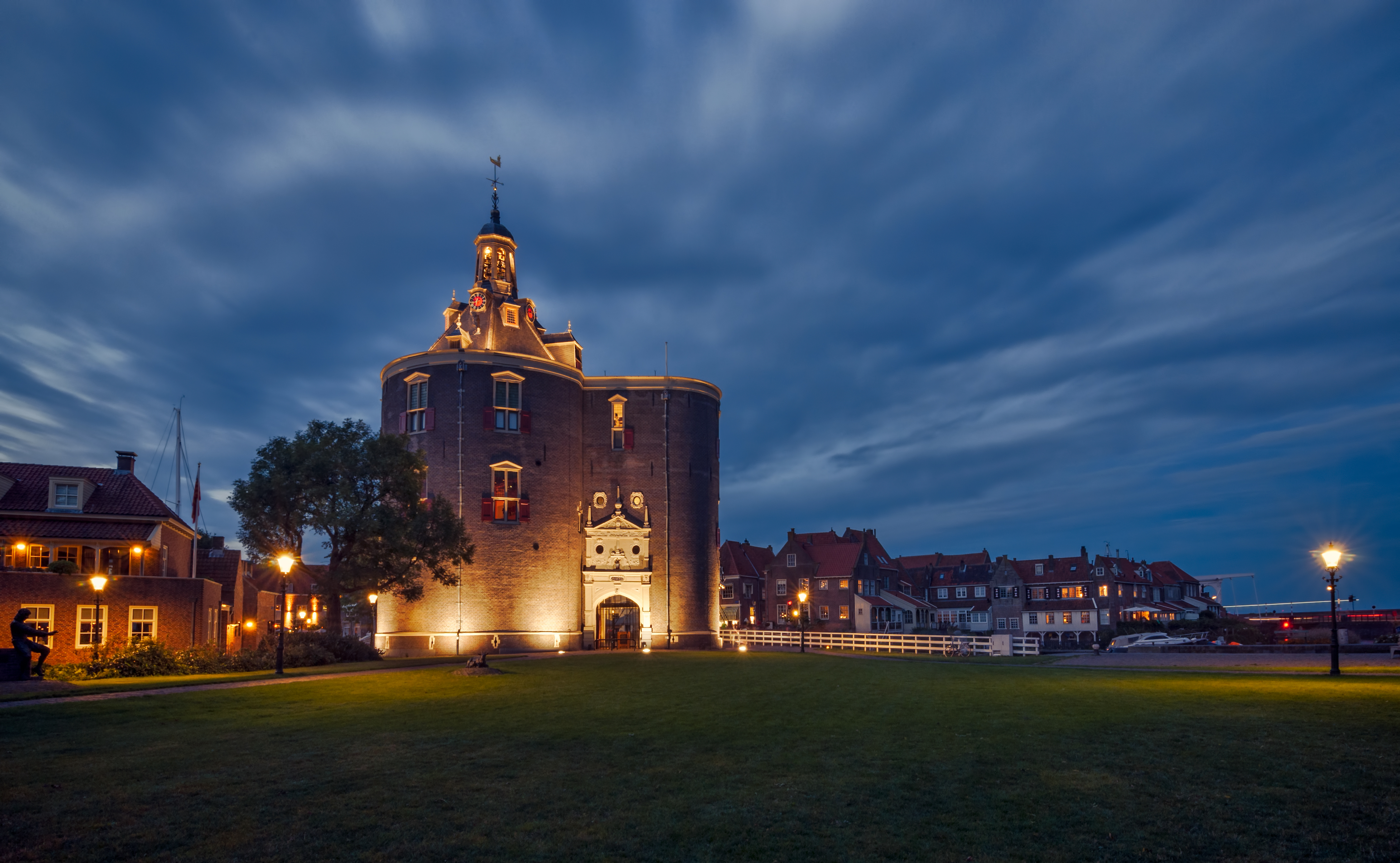
Drommedaris and 'landje van Top' at night

Restorations to the building were carried out in 1914–1915, 1956–1968, and 1973. The building and the carillon tower were restored from 2012–2015. The building reopened in the spring of 2015

== The carillon ==
From 1649 to 1657 the building was raised by two floors and the rondel was given a pointed roof with an open domed tower. Today it houses a 44-bell carillon, with bells from bell founder Geert van Wou, Pieter Hemony, A. H. van Bergen, and Eijsbouts. The carillon is tuned in meantone temperament by Pieter Hemony, On base Es2. It has a bourdon of Des2 (± 200 kg) connected as Bes on the baton keyboard.

== History of the carillon ==
Beginning in 1659, a small chime of approximately 10 bells was hung in the tower. It was cast by a Kampen bell founder named Geert van Wou (or possibly a cousin of another bellfounder with the same name) around 1524 for the Zuider- or St. Pancras tower. There a Hemony carillon replaced the original 10 bells in 1649. The old bells were kept, possibly with the goal of hanging them in the tower of the elevated New South Gate. (Zuiderpoort) One of the larger bells had been hung in the belfry on the east side of the Westerkerk; it was also moved to the Drommedaris because it matched the tuning of the other bells, according to Gerard Brandt, the historian of Enkhuizen. Peter Bakker (1946-1999), a historian from the Zuiderzee Museum, also wrote that the carillon was primarily used to warn ships in fog when they entered the haven. He concluded that the building was built for that reason.

Some bells of Geert van Wou still exist, two of which are in the current carillon. The largest of his still in existence, formerly the bell from the Westerkerk and the hour strike of the Drommedaris, features the inscription IHESUS - MARIA - IOHANNES Gherardus de Wou me Fecit anno Domini MCCCCCXXIII. Around 1960, the municipality of Enkhuizen lent the bell to the Reformed Congregations. It now hangs in the Ontmoetingskerk on Klopperstraat, where it weekly on Sundays is rung for worship. And recently one of the van Wou bells was discovered in Germany.

Around 1677, Pieter Hemony delivered one of his last pieces of work to the Drommedaris. This was the lightest set of bells he ever cast. It consisted of 24 bells (including the two Geert van Wou bells and an hour strike bell, also cast by van Wou, which Pieter Hemony agreed to use in the new carillon). The largest Hemony bell is inscribed Et Fidium Modulos Et Acuti Carmina Phaebi Vincimus P. Hemony me fec. A. 1675 We overcome / sound louder than (= vincimus) the song of the faithful (= fidium modulos) and the verses (psalms?) [not sure here]. Of the penetrating sounding Phoebus (= carmina acuti Phaebi). There is no text on the other bells except for a year, the name of P. Hemony and A. for Amsterdam. Pieter Hemony probably assembled the carillon from bells that he had in stock at his foundry in Amsterdam because although the set of bells was delivered in 1677, they have different dates ranging from 1671. The Hemony carillon was exchanged with the old bells by van Wou which perhaps were much heavier. The metal price was very high relative to the cost of labor, so it was possible for the city to trade these towards the price of the new instrument to reduce its price. Only a few things have changed in the course of time with this Hemony set of bells. There are reports that the carillon sounded very pure. In 1816 it was time for a restoration; we read in the resolutions of the Mayor and City Council on March 15 of that year that due to the poor financial condition of the municipality, money from the so-called Pole Law should be used. This was a tax that Enkhuizen was allowed to collect for the beacon on the Zuiderzee. After all, the main objective of the chimes was to guide shipping in foggy weather. A clock activated the mechanical drum mechanism to ring the bells eight times an hour the entire day and night. In 1951, the carillon was renovated by bell founder A.H. van Bergen from Heiligerlee. Van Bergan extended the instrument to three octaves (36 bells), removing Geert van Wou's hour strike bell to make room for the third octave and allow for a more logical playing mechanism. There was also an unfortunate retuning of the Hemony bells which Eijsbouts tried to remedy in 1982. The carillon was re hung again in 1974 by Petit & Fritsen from Aarle-Rixtel and restored once more in 1982 after a fundraising campaign among the Enkhuizen citizens and the business community under the motto "A ton for the Carillon". Some of Pieter Hemony's bells from the municipal museum were replaced after being repaired. The old hour bell by Van Wou was not returned from the church on Klopperstraat, but rather, a new hour-bell from Eijsbouts was added in 1982. The small van Bergen bells also were replaced. During the restoration of the building between 2011 and 2015, the wood and lead work of the dome was completely renewed and the carillon was renovated once again. A new keyboard was installed and the instrument was extended by 5 bells to 3.5 octaves. Furthermore, due to the new, better-proportioned manganese brass clappers, the sound of the historic bells in this unique carillon was significantly improved. The city carillonneur of Enkhuizen plays the bells every Thursday at noon. He also replaces the melodies on the drum twice a year. Today, the 17th-century drum plays every fifteen minutes, after which different bells sound to mark the hour and half hour. It has been a tradition since it was first commissioned in 1659 that this happens through the full 24 hours of the day and night

=== Bell outside the dome ===
Outside the building, above the eastern dial, hangs the ferryman bell from 1775 cast by Jan Verbruggen. The Latin text Labor Vincit Omnia appears on the edge of this bell. Jan Verbruggen me fecit Enchusae 1775. (Work / effort / commitment overcomes everything. Jan Verbruggen made me at Enkhuizen 1775.) The bell was made to sound again during the restoration of the carillon in the 1970s and during the restoration of 2014 provided with a new crown that previously had been destroyed. Jan Verbruggen worked in the city bell foundry on the present-day Donkerelaantje at Emmaplein in Enkhuizen, where the burial cellars of the cemetery are now located. Later he worked as a gunman for the English king in England. There is a small cannon in the collection of the Zuiderzee Museum which he made for the VOC room in Enkhuizen.

=== Drawbridge ===
In front of the Drommedaris is a white drawbridge (national monument) that was narrowed around 1900. The drawbridge gives the ships access to the Oude Haven between the Paktuinen and the Dijk. In the gallery is a pic with the old drawbridge.

=== The anchors ===
Two anchors hang on the wall on the side of the Drommedaris. According to a legend, these were captured from the Geldersen in a failed attack on Enkhuizen in 1537 during the Gelderse Wars. The Enkhuizers discovered the five anchored Gelderse ships and drove them away, forcing the Gelderse to cut their anchor lines. The anchors were then retrieved and hung as signs of victory on the English Tower (also known as the East Indian Tower). However, this tower was demolished in 1829, after which the anchors and the memorial stone were moved to the Drommedaris.

=== Picture gallery ===
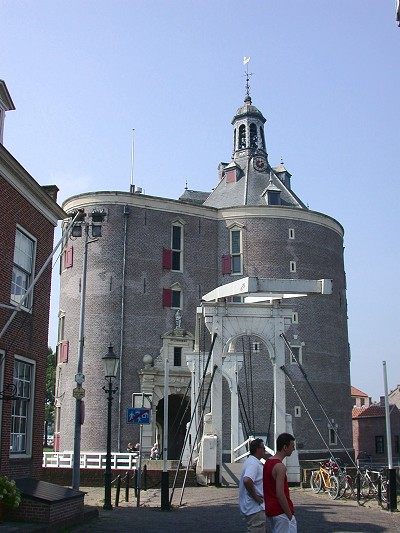
The Drommedaris on city side"

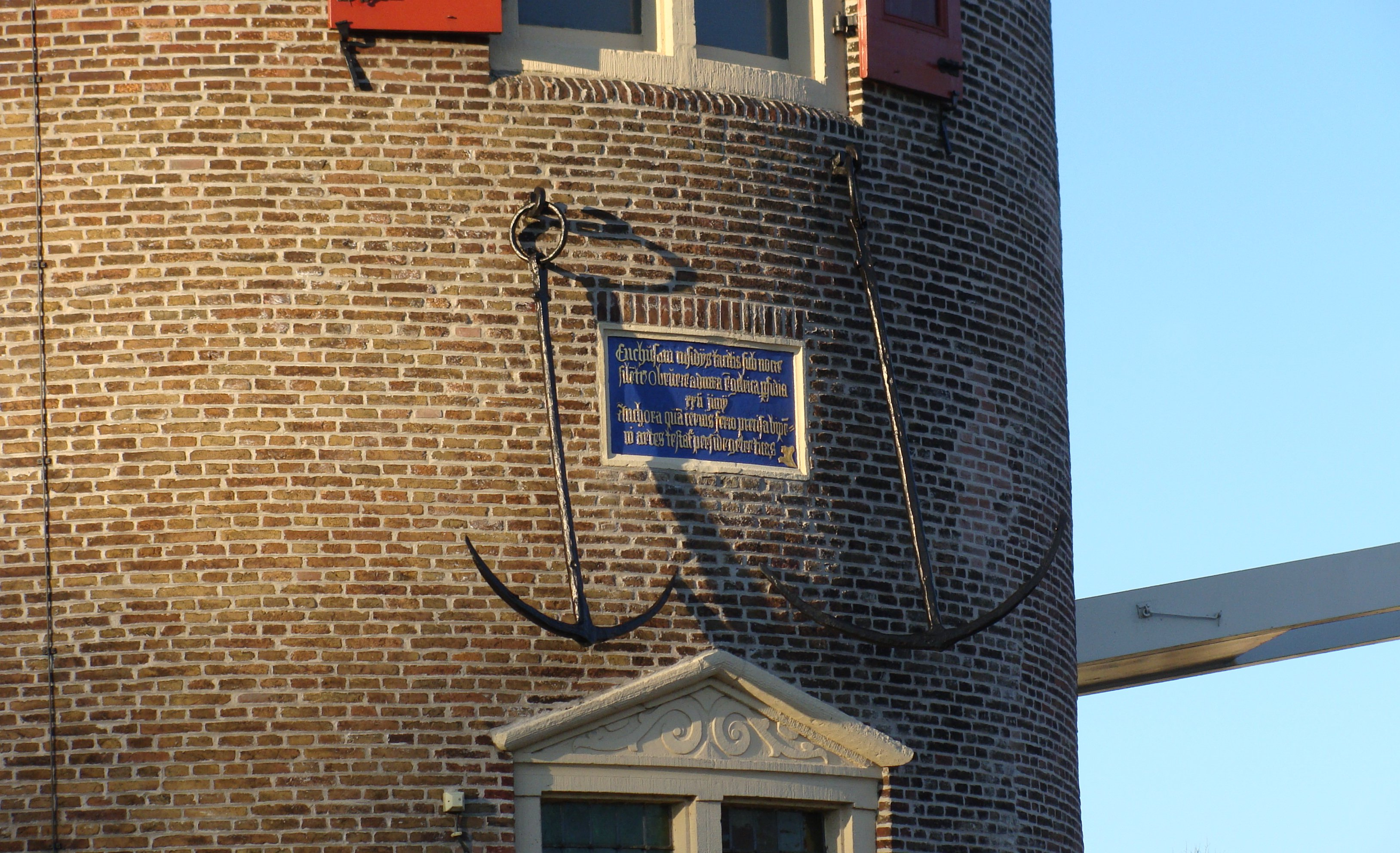
The anchors at Drommedaris

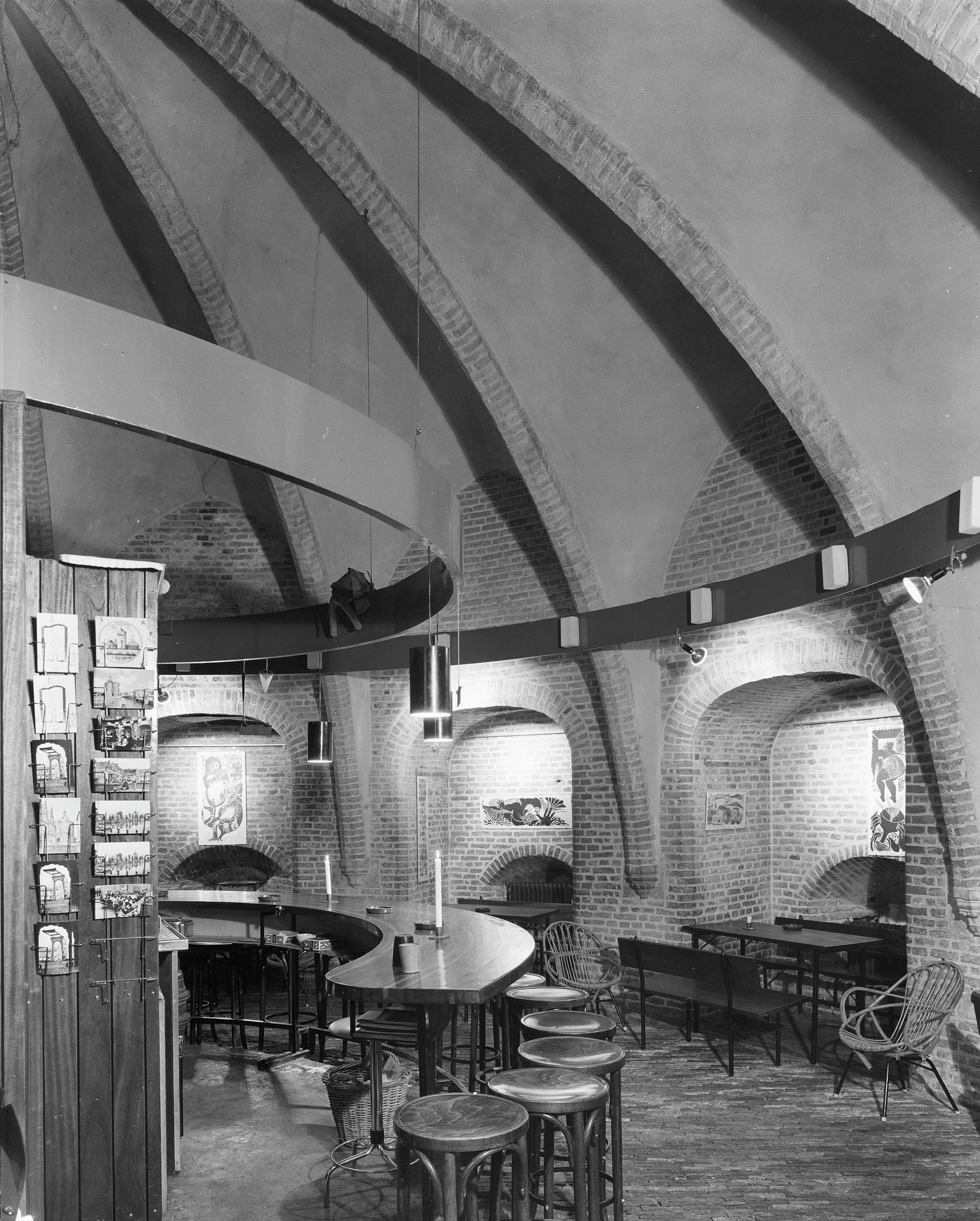
The bar ±1970 on ground floor with a rib vault and cannon holes along the walls in niches. (Where you see tables on the picture)

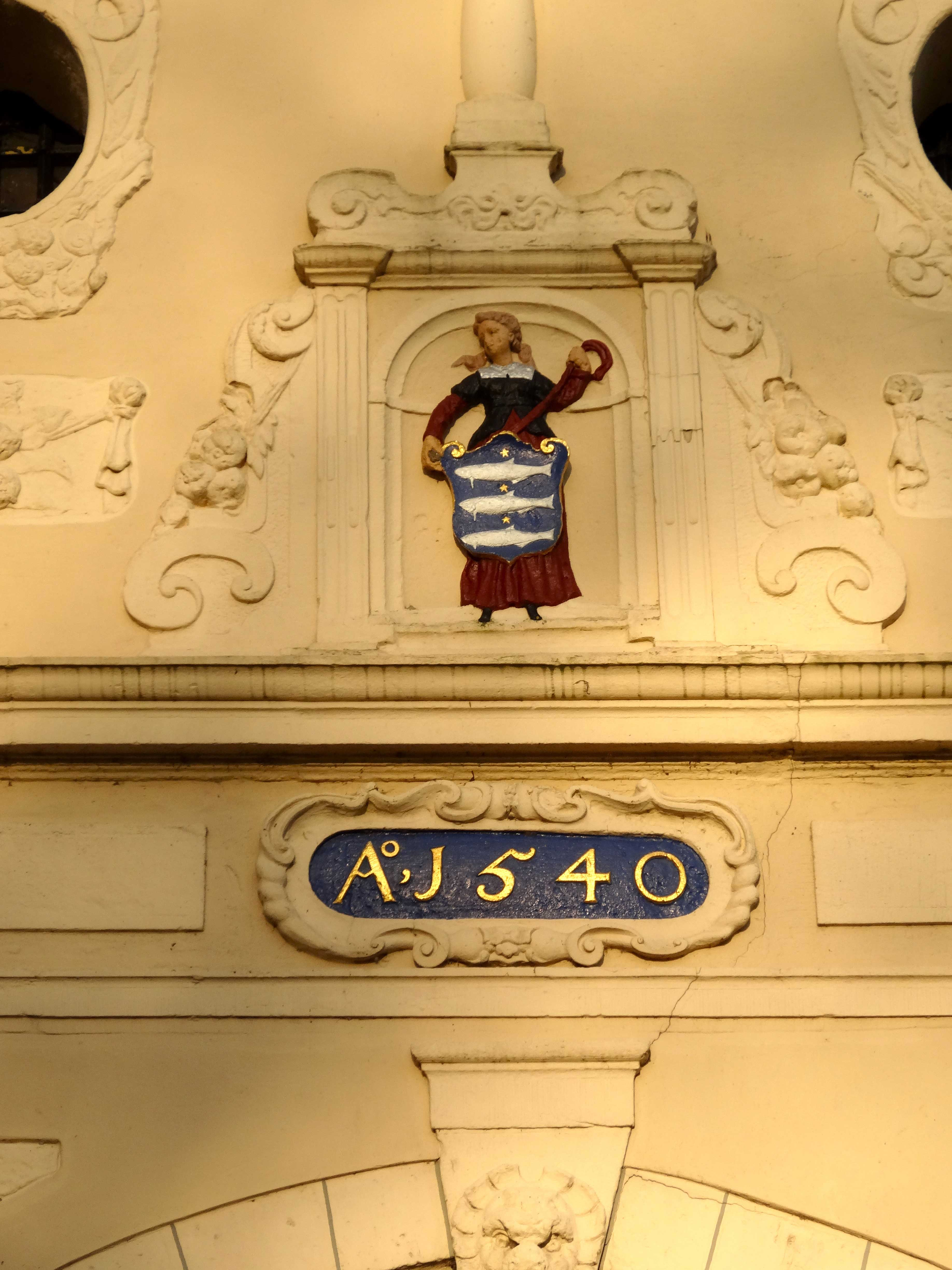
City virgin on the side of 'landje van Top'.

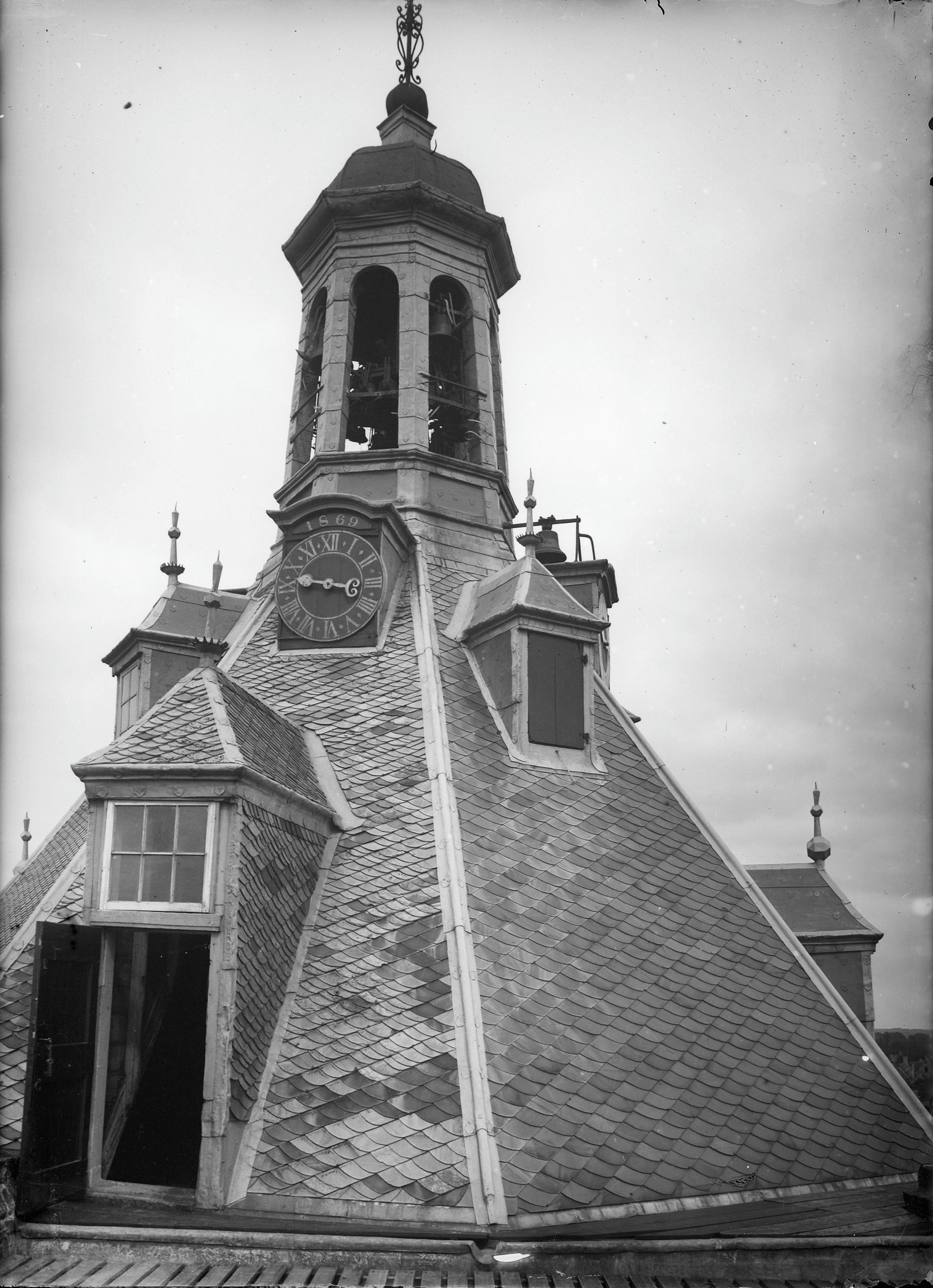
Situation of the Dome and carillon in 1889

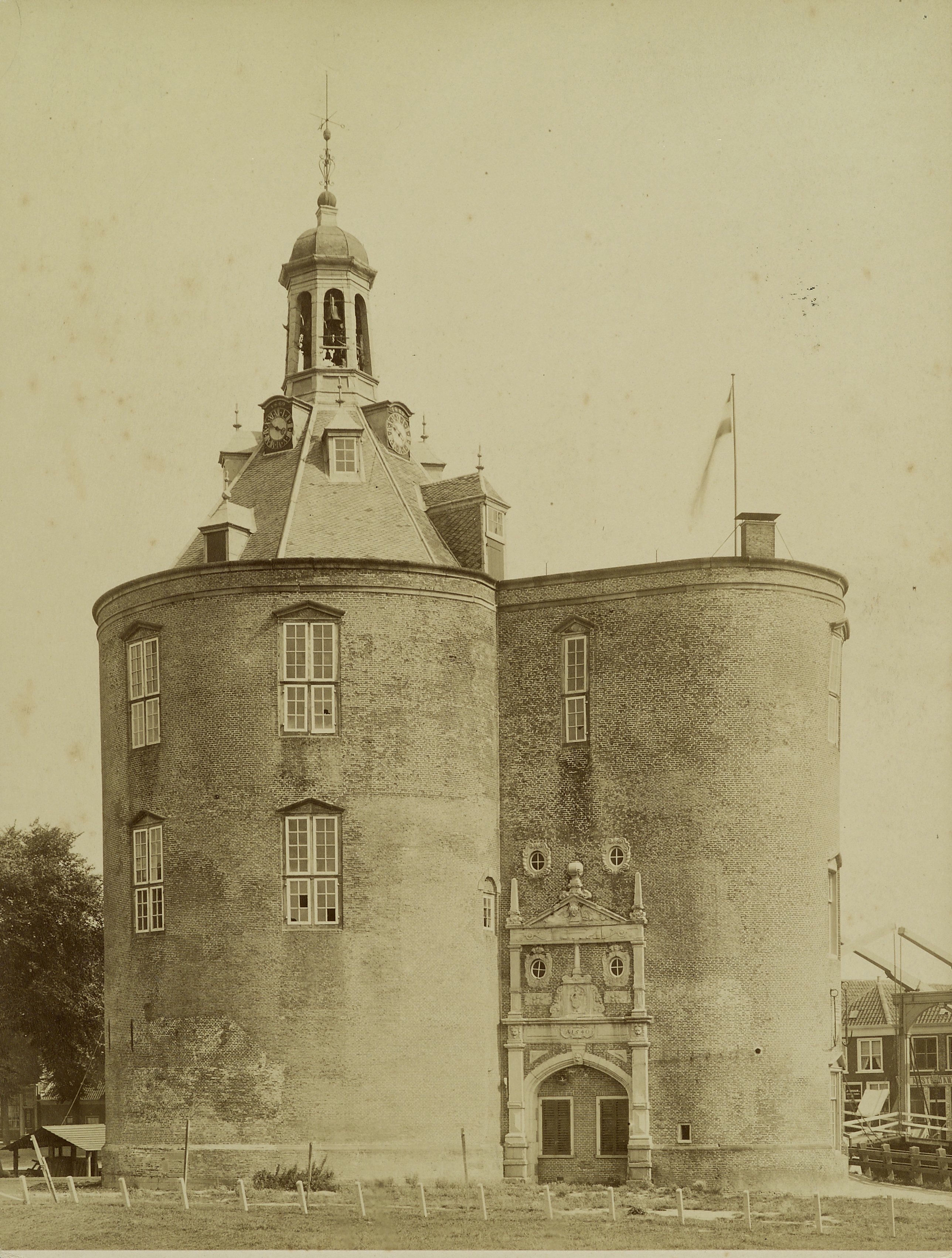
Round 1900 with telegraph office under the gate.

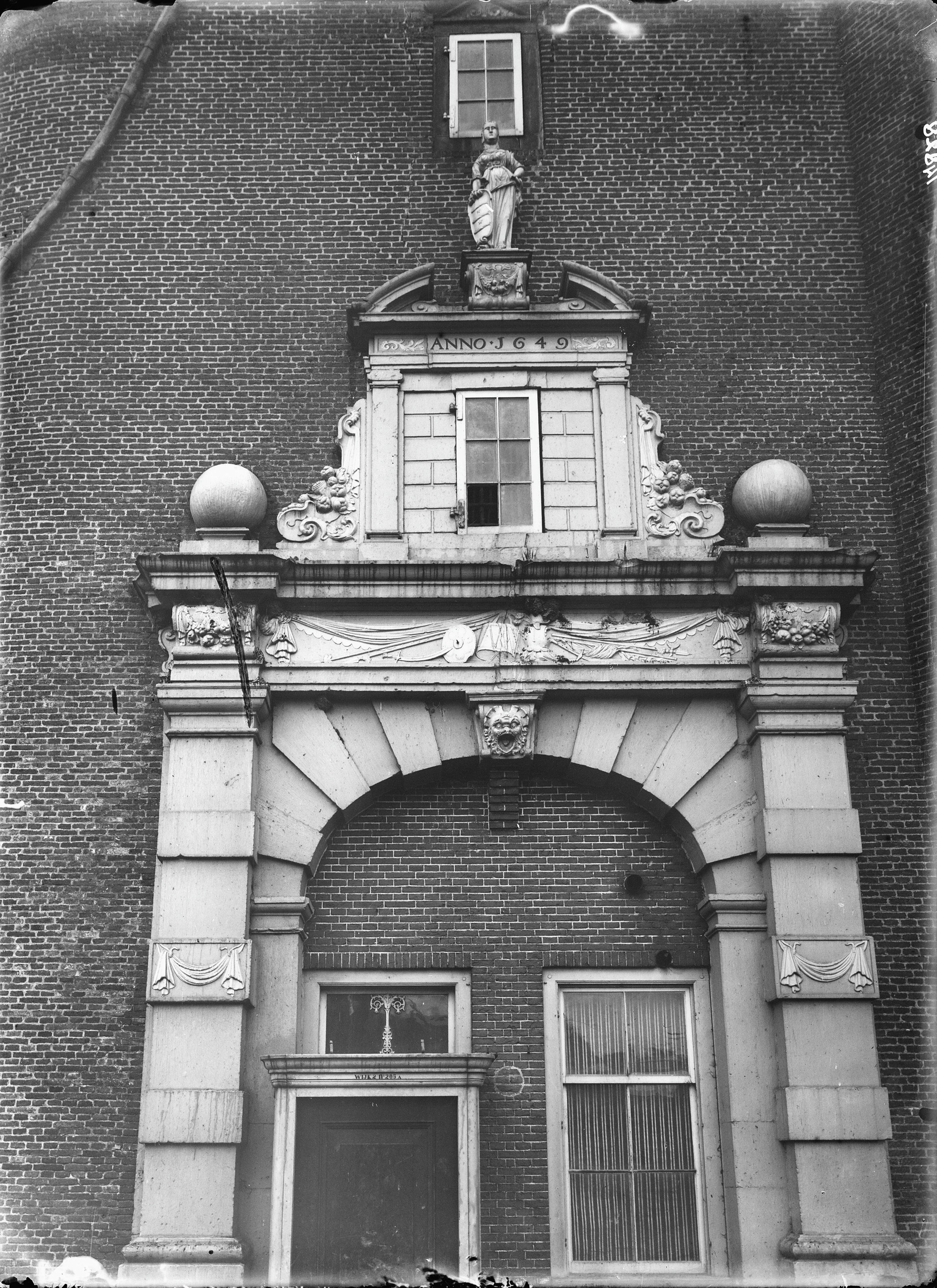
The gate on side of the bridge with the telegraph office.

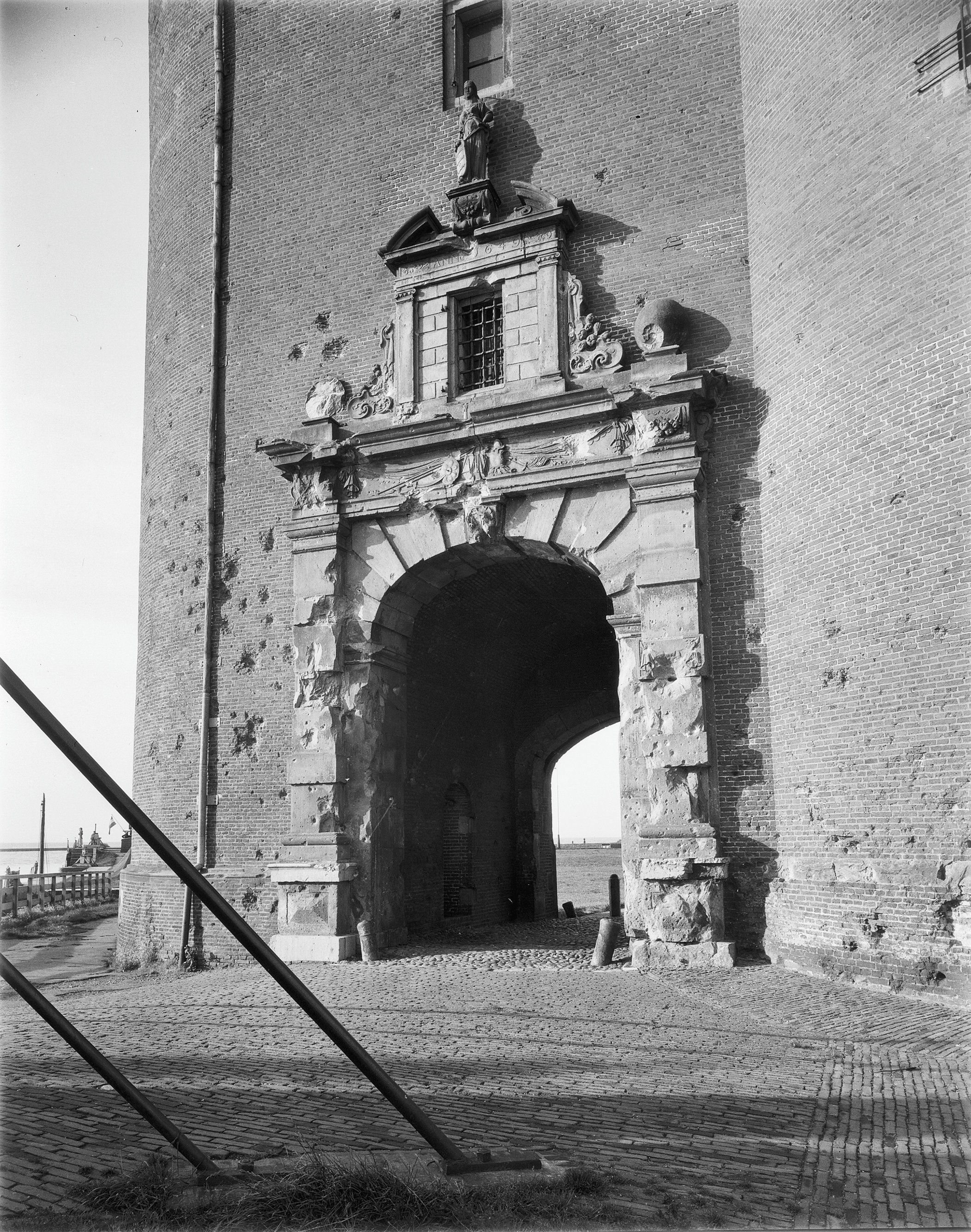
The gate on the city side in particular was full of grenade impacts.

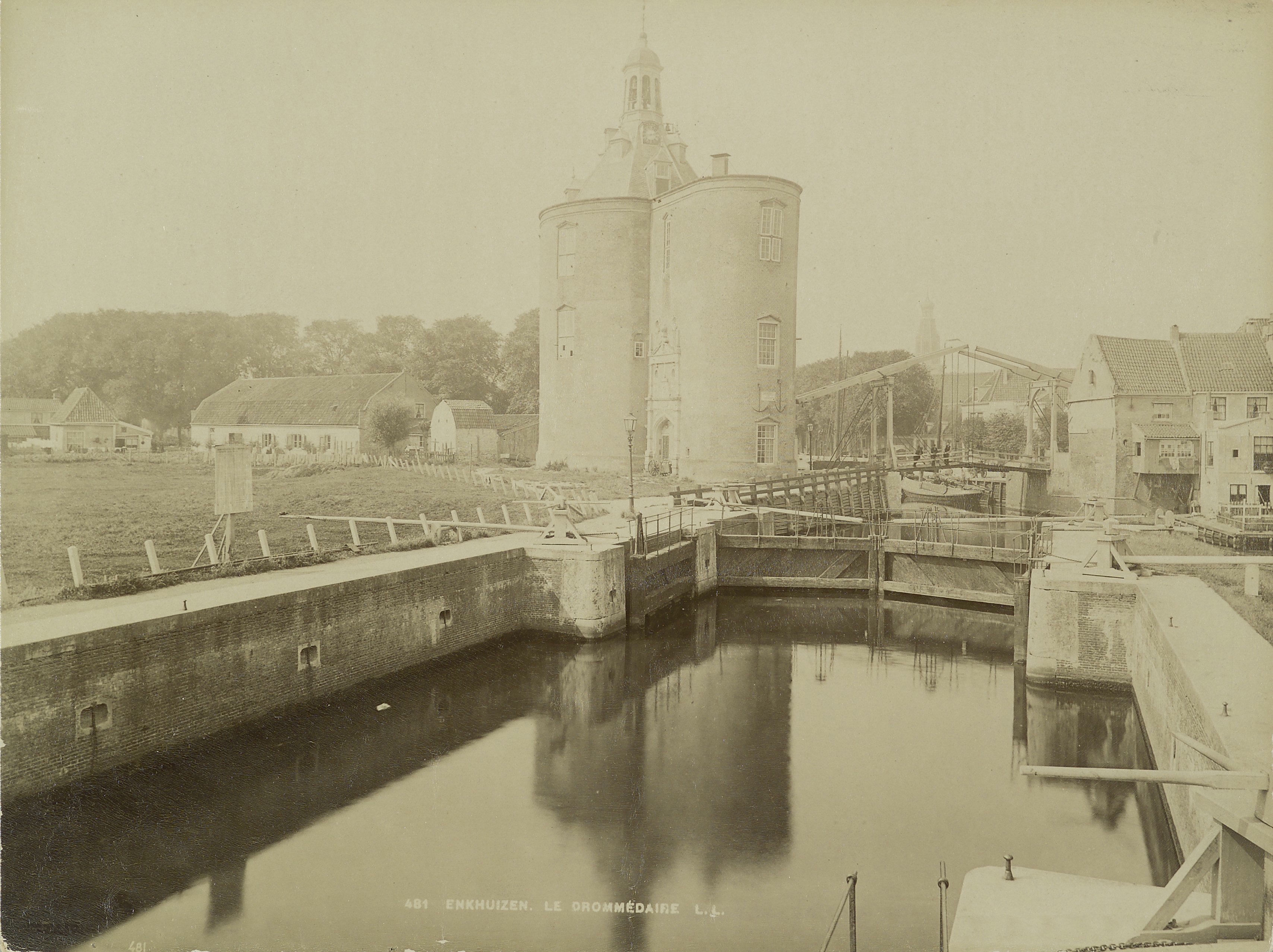
The lock with 'het landje van top' on the left and the Drommedaris around 1870. The wide bridge and the house next to the bridge with tilted covered balconies are still present on this photo. It is the oldest picture of the Drommedaris.

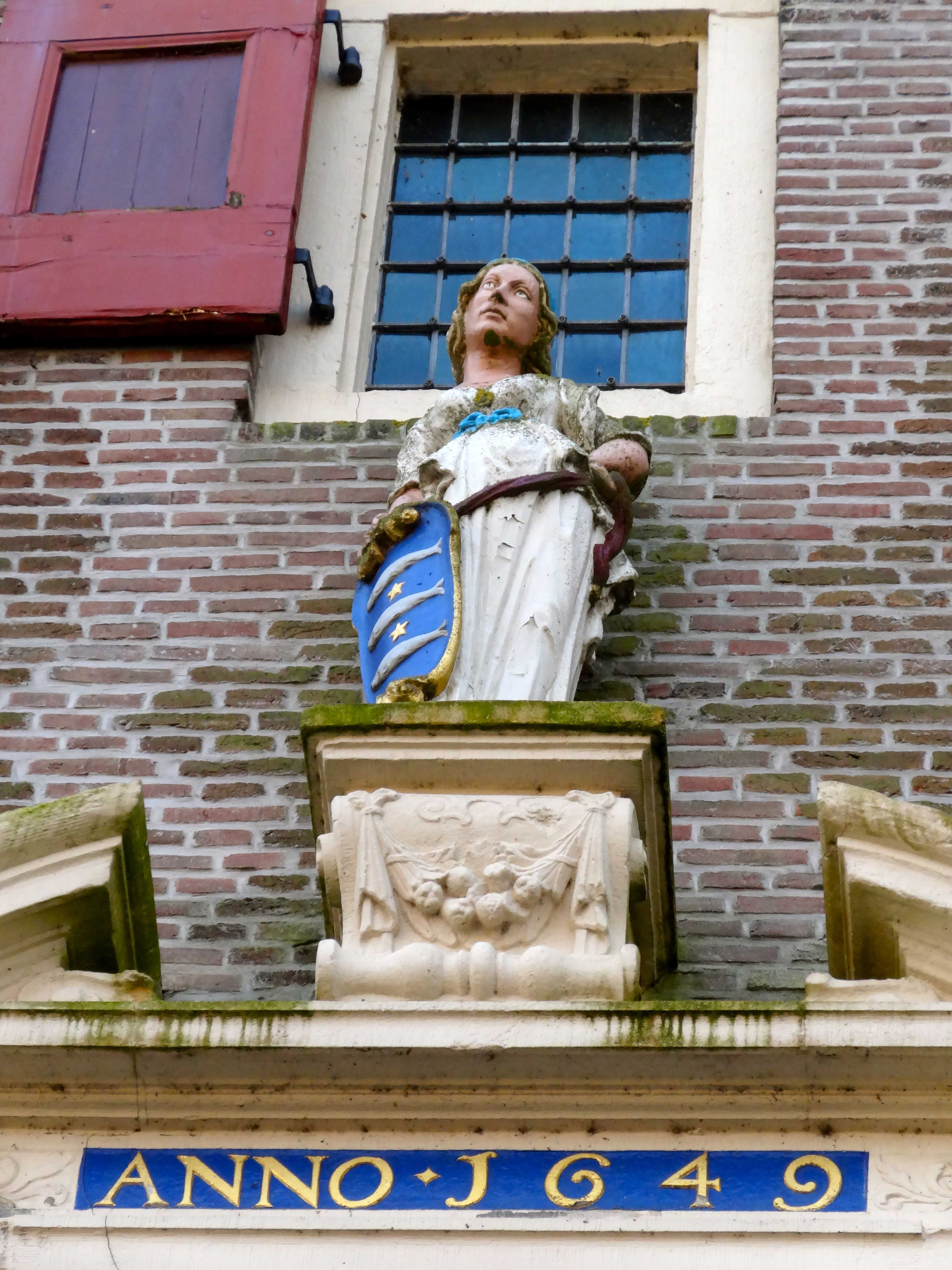
Drommedaris City virgin on side of the bridge.

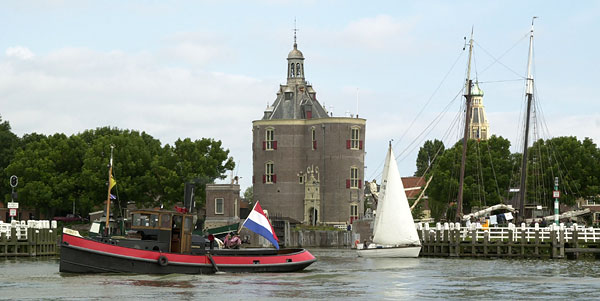
Drommedaris as seen from the 'Krabbersgat' with the 'Zuidertoren' in the distance.

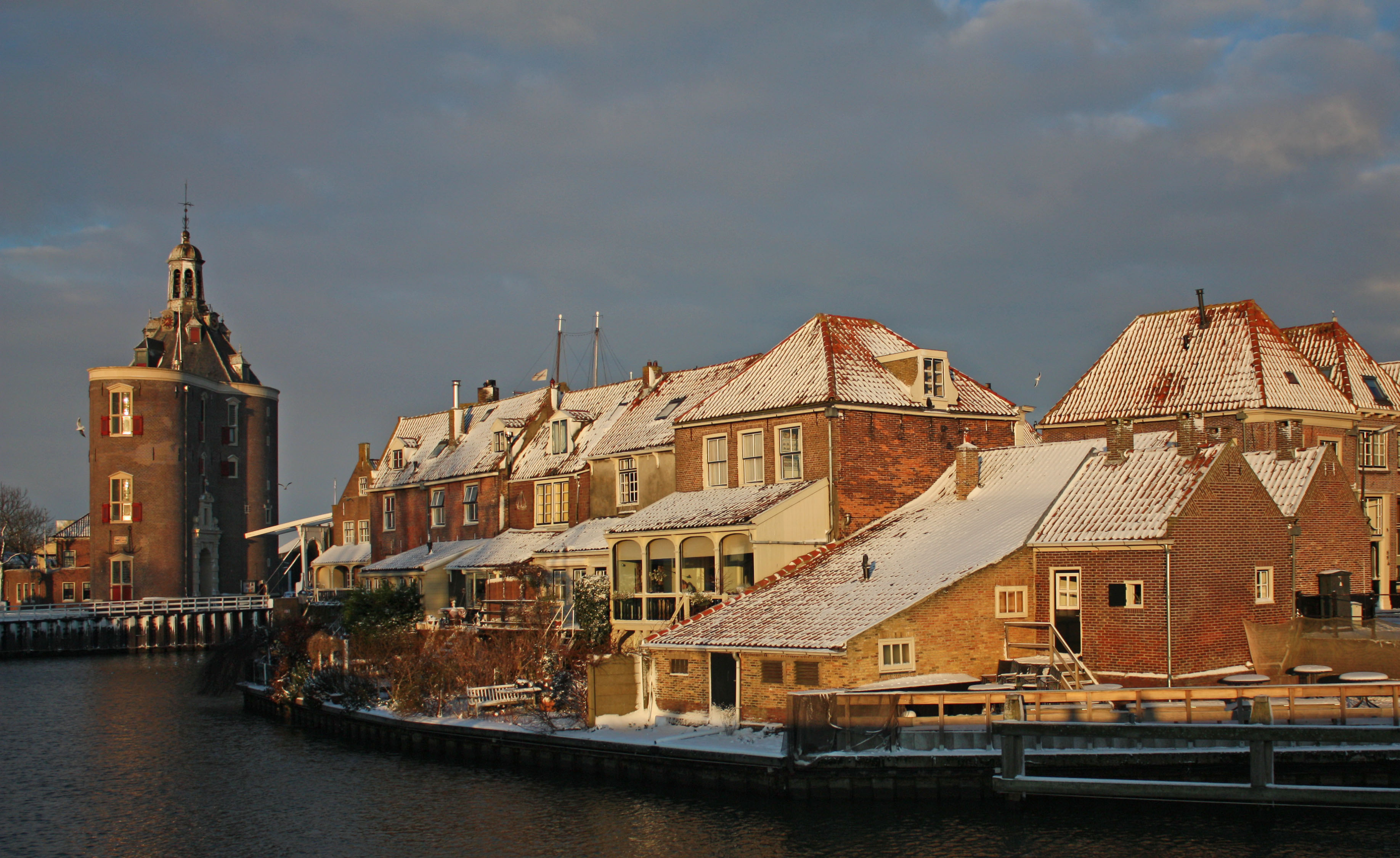
The 'kolk' behind 'Bocht/Zuiderspui' with Drommedaris in the snow.
