= Camphuysen =

Camphuysen is a Dutch surname and the name of a 17th-century family of painters:

- Dirk Rafaelsz Camphuysen (1586–1627), Dutch painter, poet and theologian
- Govert Dircksz Camphuysen (1624–1672), Dutch animal painter, son of Dirk
- Joachim Govertsz Camphuysen (1601–1659), Dutch landscape painter, brother of Rafaël, nephew of Dirk
- Rafaël Govertsz Camphuysen (1597–1657), Dutch landscape painter, brother of Joachim, nephew of Dirk

== See also ==
- Jan Kamphuijsen (1760–1841), Dutch painter
- Kamphuis, Dutch surname
