= Verschuring =

Verschuring may refer to:

== People ==
- Hendrik Verschuring (1627–1690), Dutch painter
- Willem Verschuring (1660–1726), Dutch painter

== Other uses ==
- Verschure & Co's, shipbuilding company
