= Rafaël Govertsz Camphuysen =

Dutch Golden Age landscape painter

Rafaël Govertsz Camphuysen (1597, Gorinchem – 1657, Amsterdam), was a Dutch Golden Age landscape painter.

== Biography ==
According to the Rijksbureau voor Kunsthistorische Documentatie (RKD) he was the son of a surgeon and the nephew of the painter Dirk Rafaelsz Camphuysen. He was a pupil of Jacob Gerritsz Cuyp and Dirck Govertsz and the older brother of Joachim Govertsz Camphuysen who studied with him. His sister Lysbeth married his pupil, the artist Aert van der Neer.

Camphuysen family tree

Dirk Rafaelsz Camphuysen 1586–1627		Govert Rafaelsz Camphuysen
Rafaël Dircksz Camphuysen 1616-1691	Govert Dircksz Camphuysen 1623-1672	Rafaël Govertsz Camphuysen 1597-1657	Joachim Govertsz Camphuysen 1601-1659
