= Dirk Rafaelsz Camphuysen =

Dutch painter

Dirk Rafelsz Camphuysen
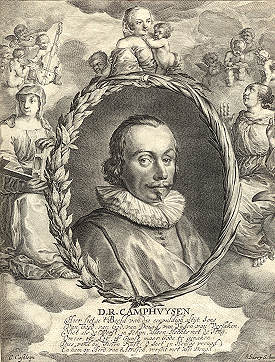
- Born: 1586; Gorinchem
- Died: 9 July 1627 (aged 40–41); Dokkum
- Education: Dirck Govertsz

Dirk Rafelsz Camphuysen (1586, Gorinchem – 9 July 1627, Dokkum) was a Dutch painter, poet and theologian.

== Biography ==
According to Houbraken, he was the son of a respected surgeon at Gorcum. His mother was a mennonite whose father Hans van Mazeik was beheaded for his beliefs. His mother died when young Dirk was eight, and his father followed her soon after into the grave. Camphuysen manifested great artistic talent. His older brother, who took over his father's surgical business, sent young Dirk to learn drawing from the painter Dirck Govertsz, who later also taught his son Govert and his son's contemporary Hendrik Verschuring. He practised art quite successfully until the age of eighteen, whereupon he started to study languages. Houbraken saw some of his paintings and drawings and said he did well at landscapes with farmsheds and animals. Houbraken also mentions maneschyn or moonlight scenes.

At Leiden, Camphuysen was recommended as a tutor to the 'Heer van Langerak', so deserted the pursuit of art, to become a private tutor and secretary in Nieuwpoort (Netherlands), where he studied theology in his free time. After substituting a few times for pastor Taurinus in the Domkerk in Utrecht (city), he was appointed minister of Vleuten by his boss, 'Heer van Langerak'. He married and was relatively successful as a minister, but he had embraced the doctrines of Arminianism, and like other Arminians or Remonstrants, he was banned from ministry and teaching and driven into exile (1619). Another painter-minister Lambert Jacobsz told him to leave the ministry and take up safer pursuits. He apparently took up poetry rather than painting, since so few of his paintings survive today. Houbraken claimed to have taken his information from Life of Dirk Rafelsz. Kamphuizen, a pamphlet that was published four times; first in Rotterdam, by Barent Bos, 1683, then in Amsterdam, by Jan Rieuwertsz, 1699 (this is the version Houbraken read); third in Amsterdam, by Marten Schagen, 1723, and lastly in Amsterdam, by Petrus Conradi, 1775.

The close of his life was spent at Dokkum. His nephew Raphael (born 1597) is by some considered to have been the author of several of the works ascribed to him, and his son Govaert (1624–1674), a follower or imitator of Paul Potter, is similarly credited. Houbraken was surprised that Camphuysen let his son learn painting, since his biography seemed to be a treatise against the pursuit of arts.

== Family tree ==
Camphuysen family tree

Dirk Rafaelsz Camphuysen 1586–1627		Govert Rafaelsz Camphuysen
Rafaël Dircksz Camphuysen 1616-1691	Govert Dircksz Camphuysen 1623-1672	Rafaël Govertsz Camphuysen 1597-1657	Joachim Govertsz Camphuysen 1601-1659

== Works ==
Camphuysen left a translation of the Psalms, and a number of short pieces of poetry. He was also author of several theological works, among which is a Compendium Doctrinae Sociniorum. His pictures are mostly small. According to the Encyclopædia Britannica Eleventh Edition, the best of his works are his sunset and moonlight scenes and his views of the Rhine and other rivers.

== Dokkum, Zuiderbolwerk cemetery. ==
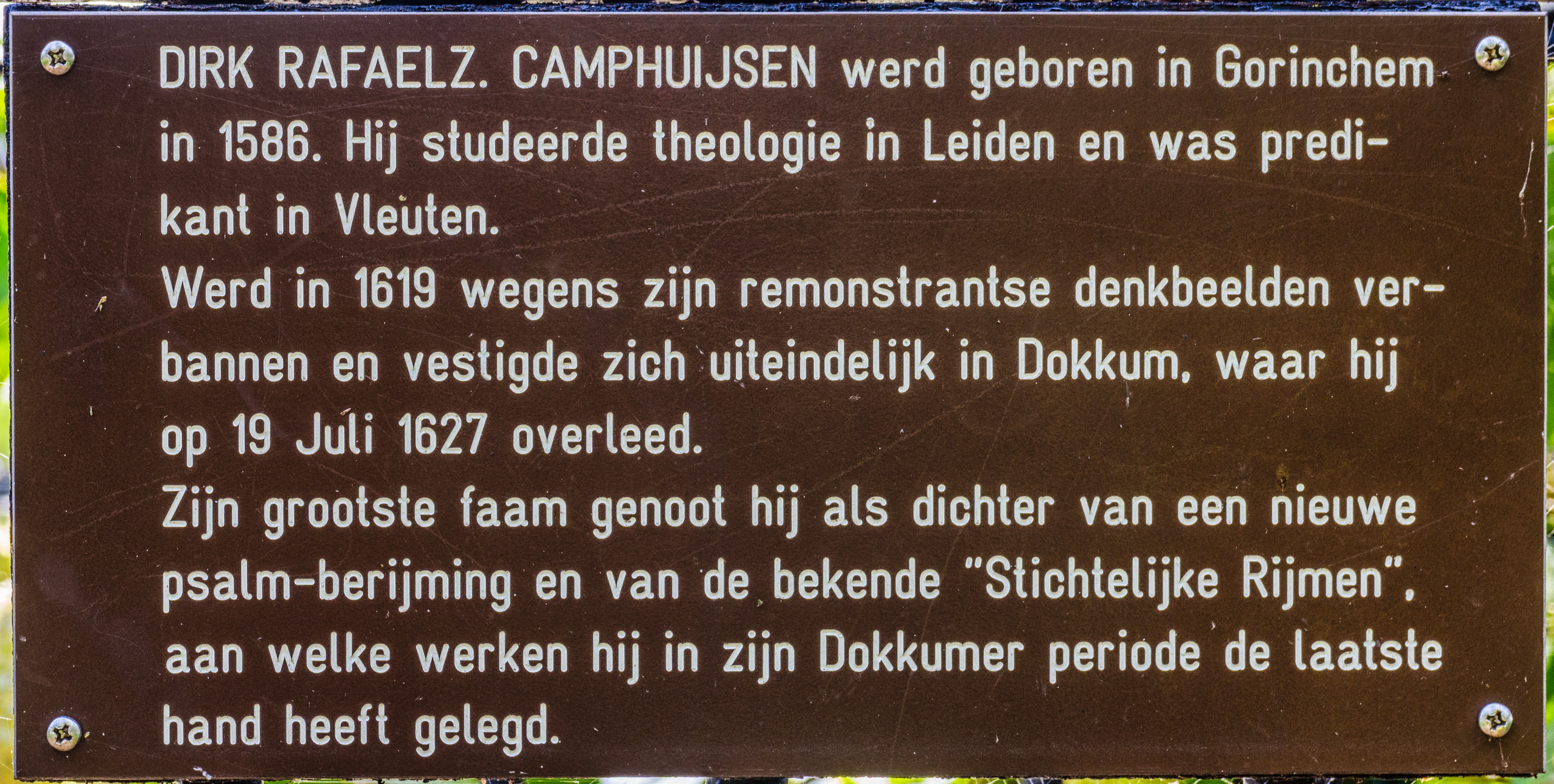
Information at the grave of Dirck Raphaelsz Camphuysen.
