= Mattheus Wijtmans =

Dutch painter

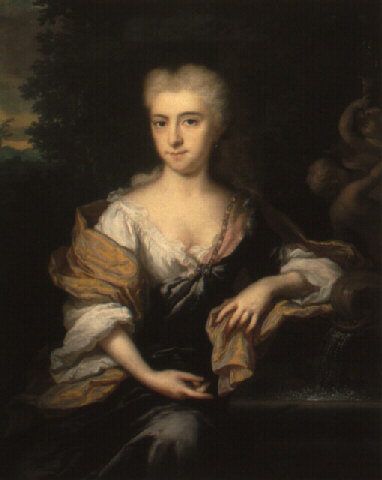
Mattheus Wytmans, Portrait of a lady.

Mattheus Wijtmans was a Brabantian painter, born in Den Bosch. (or Mathijs/Mathys Whytmans). He lived for 10 years (1640-1650) in Gorinchem and died in 1689, Utrecht?) was a Dutch Golden Age painter.

== Biography ==
Wytmans was a student of the painter Hendrik Verschuring, and later of Jan van Bijlert in Utrecht. He painted in the manner of Caspar Netscher, according to Houbraken, but he was best at painting flowers and fruit.

== Paintings ==
- In 1996 Sotheby's of London auctioned a painting called Portrait of a lady.
- Portrait of a man in a garden, leaning on a balcony, Louvre, Paris.
