= Kamphuis =

Kamphuis is a Dutch toponymic surname. Meaning "house on a fenced/enclosed field", it may have a generic origin, or refer specifically to one of a number of hamlets with that name. It is most common in the provinces of Gelderland and Overijssel. Among variants are Camphues, Kamphuijs and plural forms like Kamphuijsen. People with this name include:

- Esmé Kamphuis (born 1983), Dutch heptathlete and bobsledder
- Johannes Camphuys (1634–1695), Dutch Governor-General of the Dutch East Indies

Oude Kamphuis

- Niels Oude Kamphuis (born 1977), Dutch football player

== See also ==
- Kamphuis Field at Liberty Softball Stadium, named after softball pitcher Dwayne Kamphuis
- Camphuysen, family of 17th-century Dutch painters
- Jan Kamphuijsen (1760–1841), Dutch painter
