= Dirck Govertsz =

Dutch Golden Age painter

Dirck Govertsz (1575, Gorinchem – 1647, Gorinchem), was a Dutch Golden Age painter.

== Biography ==
According to Houbraken he was the teacher of Dirk & Raphael Camphuysen and Hendrik Verschuring.

According to the RKD, besides being known as the teacher of Dirk & Rafaël Govertsz Camphuysen and Hendrik Verschuring, few works are known. Works by him have been wrongly attributed to Jacob de Gheyn II or III due to an incorrect reading of his monogram.
