= Tre Kronor Castle, seen from the southwest =

Oil painting of Tre Kronor Castle by Govert Camphuysen

- Slottet Tre Kronor, sett från sydväst (Swedish)
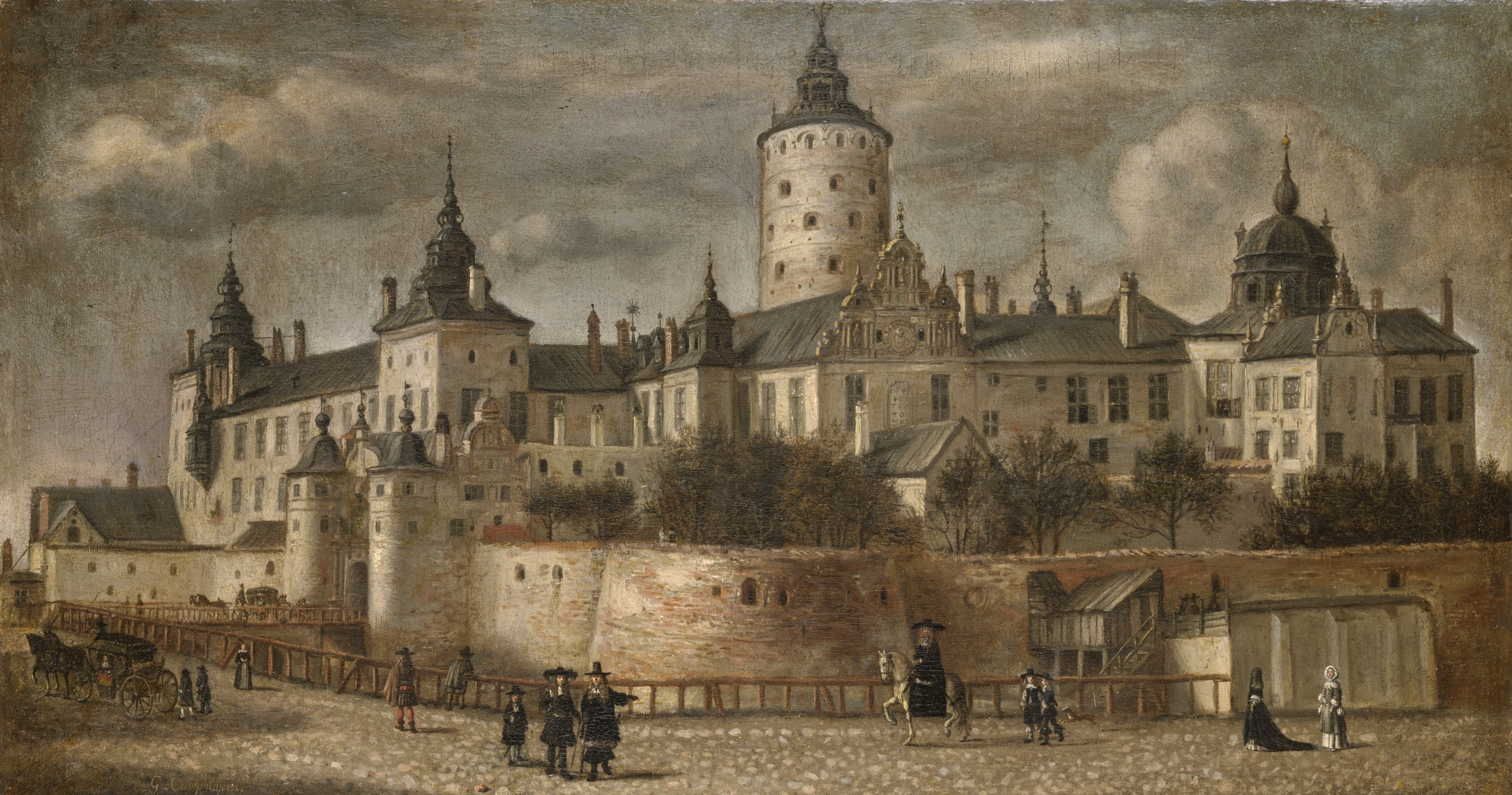
- Artist: Govert Dircksz Camphuysen
- Year: 1661
- Catalogue: SSM 11700
- Medium: Oil on canvas
- Subject: Tre Kronor Castle
- Dimensions: 82 cm × 44 cm (32 in × 17 in)
- Location: Stockholm City Museum, Stockholm, Sweden

Tre Kronor Castle, seen from the southwest (Swedish: Slottet Tre Kronor, sett från sydväst) also called Tre Kronor from Slottsbacken (Swedish: Tre Kronor från Slottsbacken) is a 1661 oil painting by Dutch artist Govert Dircksz Camphuysen. The panting's subject is the Monarchy of Sweden's Tre Kronor Castle, which was destroyed by fire in 1697. The painting is the only known color image of the structure.

The signed and dated original is owned by the Stockholm City Museum (inventory number SSM 11700). It had been part of a private collection in England—whose owner had assumed it depicted some unknown Dutch castle—prior to being 'discovered' in 1947 by the Dutch firm Kunsthandel de Boer. In 1948, Kunsthandel de Boer put the painting up for sale for 15.000,00 kr. It was then purchased by Stockholm City, and was shown as part of a new acquisitions exhibit beginning in March 1948 at the city museum.

Uppsala University owns a copy of the painting (inventory number UU 52), which has been described as either a "contemporary copy" or a "contemporary studio replica." It was donated to the university by Adolf Ludvig Stierneld upon his death in 1835 (per his 1820 will). Until the discovery of the signed original, the creator of the painting in the university's collection was unknown, as was its status as a copy. Inscribed on the backside of the canvas, in Stierneld's hand, is written the title "The Old Stockholm Castle in the Time of Queen Christina."
