= Joachim Govertsz Camphuysen =

Dutch Golden Age landscape painter

Joachim Govertsz Camphuysen (1601, Gorinchem – 1659, Amsterdam), was a Dutch Golden Age landscape painter.

== Biography ==
According to the RKD he was the son of a surgeon and the nephew of the painter Dirk Rafaelsz Camphuysen. His brother Rafaël Govertsz Camphuysen studied with him, and his cousin of the same name (Dirk's son Rafaël) also became a painter. His sister Lysbeth married the artist Aert van der Neer who followed his style. He also influenced the painter Pieter van Asch.

Camphuysen family tree

Dirk Rafaelsz Camphuysen 1586–1627		Govert Rafaelsz Camphuysen
Rafaël Dircksz Camphuysen 1616-1691	Govert Dircksz Camphuysen 1623-1672	Rafaël Govertsz Camphuysen 1597-1657	Joachim Govertsz Camphuysen 1601-1659
