= Willem Verschuring =

Dutch Golden Age painter

Willem Verschuring (September 25, 1660, Gorinchem – March 11, 1726, Gorinchem), was a Dutch Golden Age Painter, Mezzotinter and a Burgomaster. He was born to Hendrik Verschuring and Aertgen van der Ham.

== Biography ==
He learned to paint from his father, Hendrik Verschuring, and later became a pupil of Jan Verkolje in Delft. He specialized in making portraits and merry companies and could have become a great painter, but he left painting for more lucrative pursuits.

According to the RKD he followed in the footsteps of his father and became a member of the Gorinchem regency (Vroedschap) in 1702.
