= Aert van der Neer =

Dutch painter

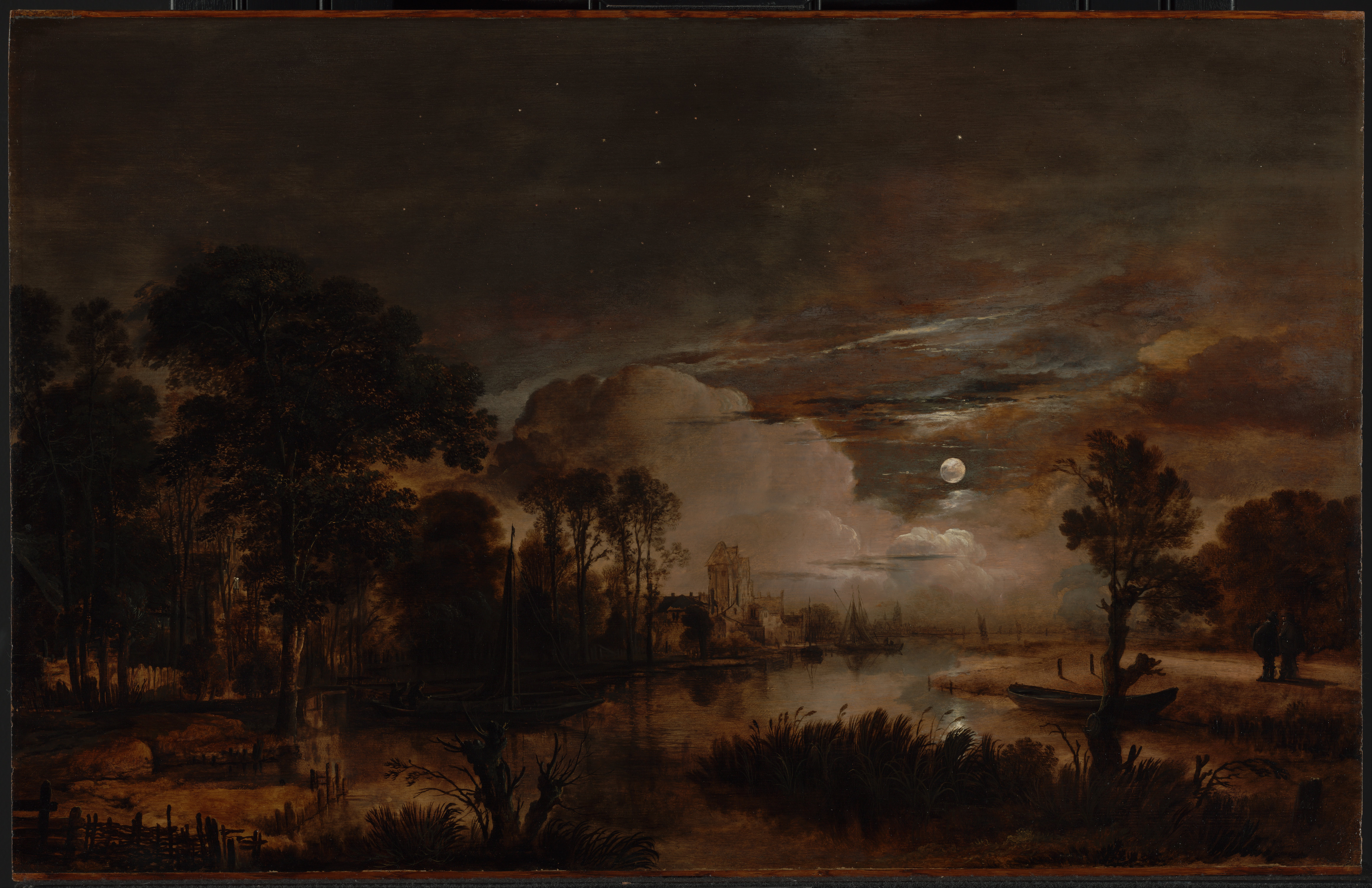
Moonlit Landscape with a View of the New Amstel River and Castle Kostverloren (1647–49); Oil on wood; 57.5 × 89.9 cm, Getty Center

Aert van der Neer, or Aernout or Artus (c. 1603 – 9 November 1677), was a landscape painter of the Dutch Golden Age, who specialized in small night scenes lit only by moonlight and fires, and snowy winter landscapes, both often looking down a canal or river. He was a contemporary of Aelbert Cuyp and Meindert Hobbema, and like the latter he lived and died in comparative obscurity.

== Biography ==
Van der Neer was born in Gorinchem. According to Arnold Houbraken, he worked as a steward to the lords of Arkel, which would account for the absence of any pictures dating from his early years. He became an amateur painter possibly upon contact with the Amsterdam painters Rafael and Joachim Govertsz Camphuysen, whose sister Lysbeth he married in 1629. They had six children: Grietje (1629), Eglon (~1635), Cornelia (1642), Elisabeth (1645), Pieter (1648), and Alida (1650). Five were baptized in the Nieuwe Kerk, not far from Kalverstraat where he lived.

Van der Neer was barely able to support his family by selling his landscapes, which were not highly valued. In 1659 it seemed necessary to supplement his income by keeping a wine tavern, but two years later he went broke. He died at Kerkstraat in abject poverty, and his art was so little esteemed that the pictures left by him were valued at about five shillings apiece. His son Eglon became a portrait painter himself.

== Career ==
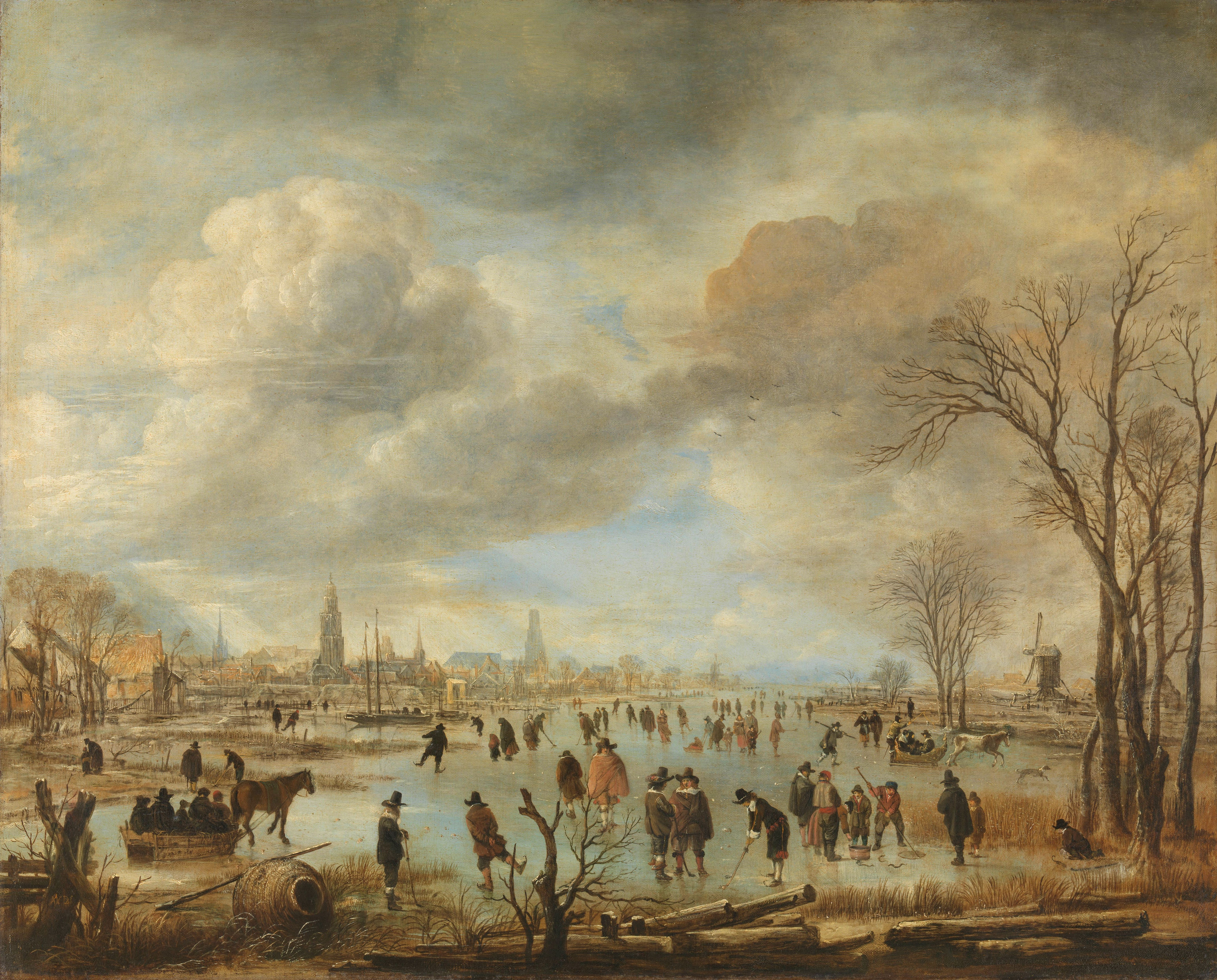
Winter Landscape with Skaters

The earliest pictures in which Van Der Neer coupled his monogram of A.V. and D.N. interlaced with a date are a winter landscape in the Rijksmuseum at Amsterdam (dated 1639), and another in the Martins collection at Kiel (1642) immature works both, of poor quality. Far better is the Winter Landscape (1643), and the Moonlight Scene (1644) once in the d'Arenberg collection in Brussels.

In 1652 Van Der Neer witnessed the fire which consumed the old town-hall of Amsterdam. He made this accident the subject for two or three pictures, now in the galleries of Berlin and Copenhagen. Though Amsterdam appears to have been constantly Van Der Neer's domicile, his pictures tell that he was well acquainted with the canals and woods about Haarlem and Leiden, and with the reaches of the Meuse and Rhine. Dordrecht, the home of Aelbert Cuyp, is sometimes found in his pictures, and substantial evidence exists that there was friendship between the two men. At some period of their lives they laid their hands to the same canvases, on each of which they left their joint mark. On some it was the signature of the name, on others the more convincing signature of style. There are landscapes in the collections of the dukes of Bedford and Westminster, in which Cuyp has represented either the frozen Maes with fishermen packing herrings, or the moon reflecting its light on the river's placid waters. These are models after which Van Der Neer appears to have worked.

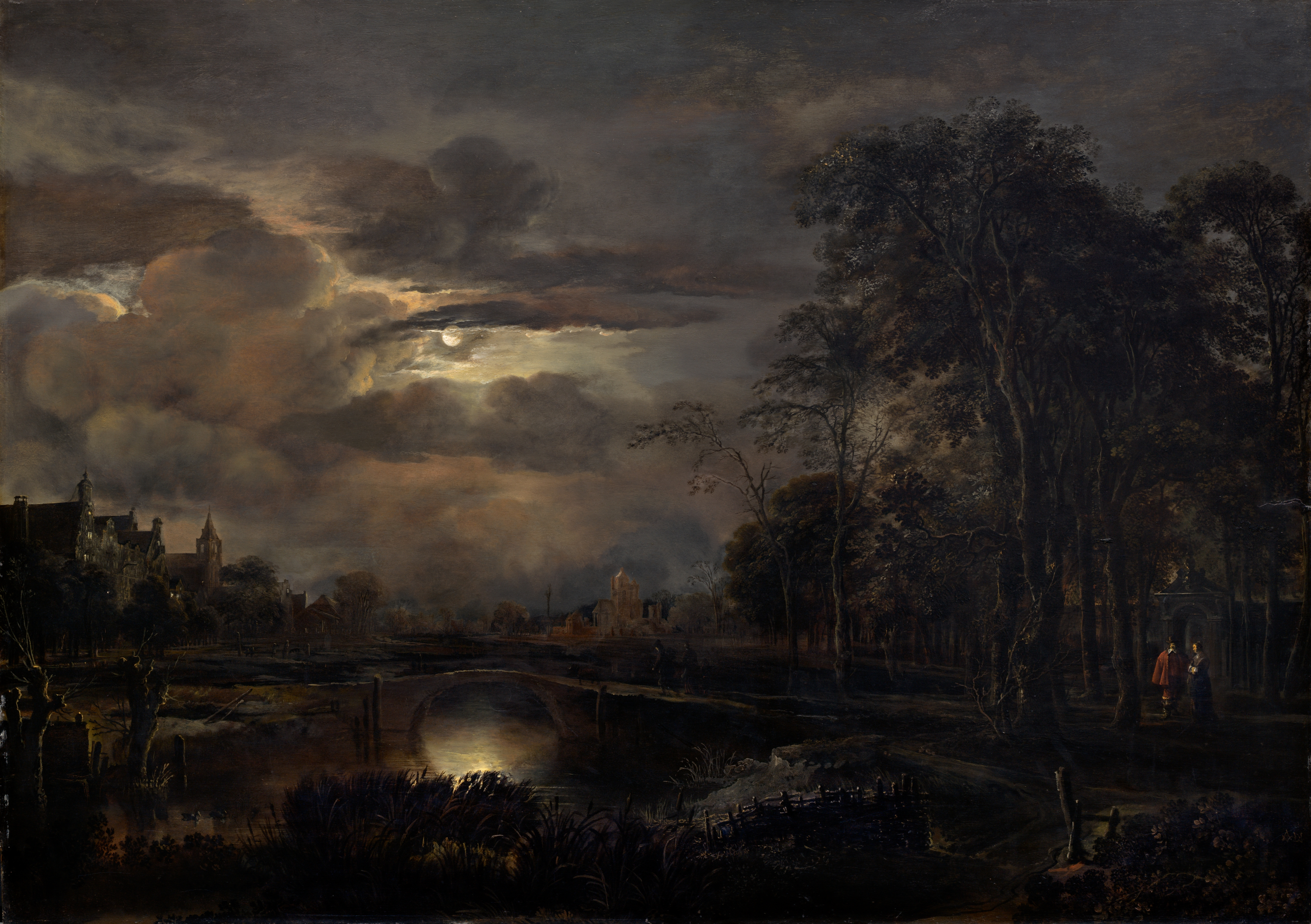
Moonlit Landscape with Bridge, one of Van Der Neer's "nocturnes" (night scenes) (1648–1650); oil on panel; 78.4 x 110.2 cm (30 7/8 x 43 3/8 in.); on display, the National Gallery of Art, Washington, D.C.

The same feeling and similar subjects are found in Cuyp and Van Der Neer, before and after their partnership, but Cuyp was the leading genius. Van Der Neer got assistance from him; Cuyp expected none from Van Der Neer. He carefully enlivened his friend's pictures, when asked to do so, with figures and cattle. It is in pictures jointly produced by them that we discover Van Der Neer's presence at Dordrecht. We are near Dordrecht in the landscape sunset of the Louvre, in which Cuyp evidently painted the foreground and cows. In the National Gallery, London picture Cuyp signs his name on the pail of a milkmaid, whose figure and red skirt he has painted with light effectiveness near the edge of Van Der Neer's landscape. Again, a couple of fishermen with a dog, and a sportsman creeping up to surprise some ducks, are Cuyp's in a capital Van Der Neer at the Staedel Institute in Frankfurt.

Van Der Neer's favourite subjects were the rivers and watercourses of his native country, either at sunset or after dark. He is known for his skill in rendering translucence, which allows objects even at distance to appear in the darkness with varieties of warm brown and steel greys. Another of his frequent subjects is frozen water, and his daylight icescapes with golfers, sleighers, and fishermen are about as numerous as his moonlight scenes. But he always avoids the impression of frostiness, which is one of his great gifts.

His pictures are not scarce. They are less valuable in the market than those of Cuyp or Hobbema; but, possessing a charm peculiarly their own, they are much sought after by collectors. Out of about one hundred and fifty pictures accessible to the public, the choicest selection is in the Hermitage at Saint Petersburg. In England paintings from his brush are to be found at the National Gallery and Wallace Collection.

== Works ==
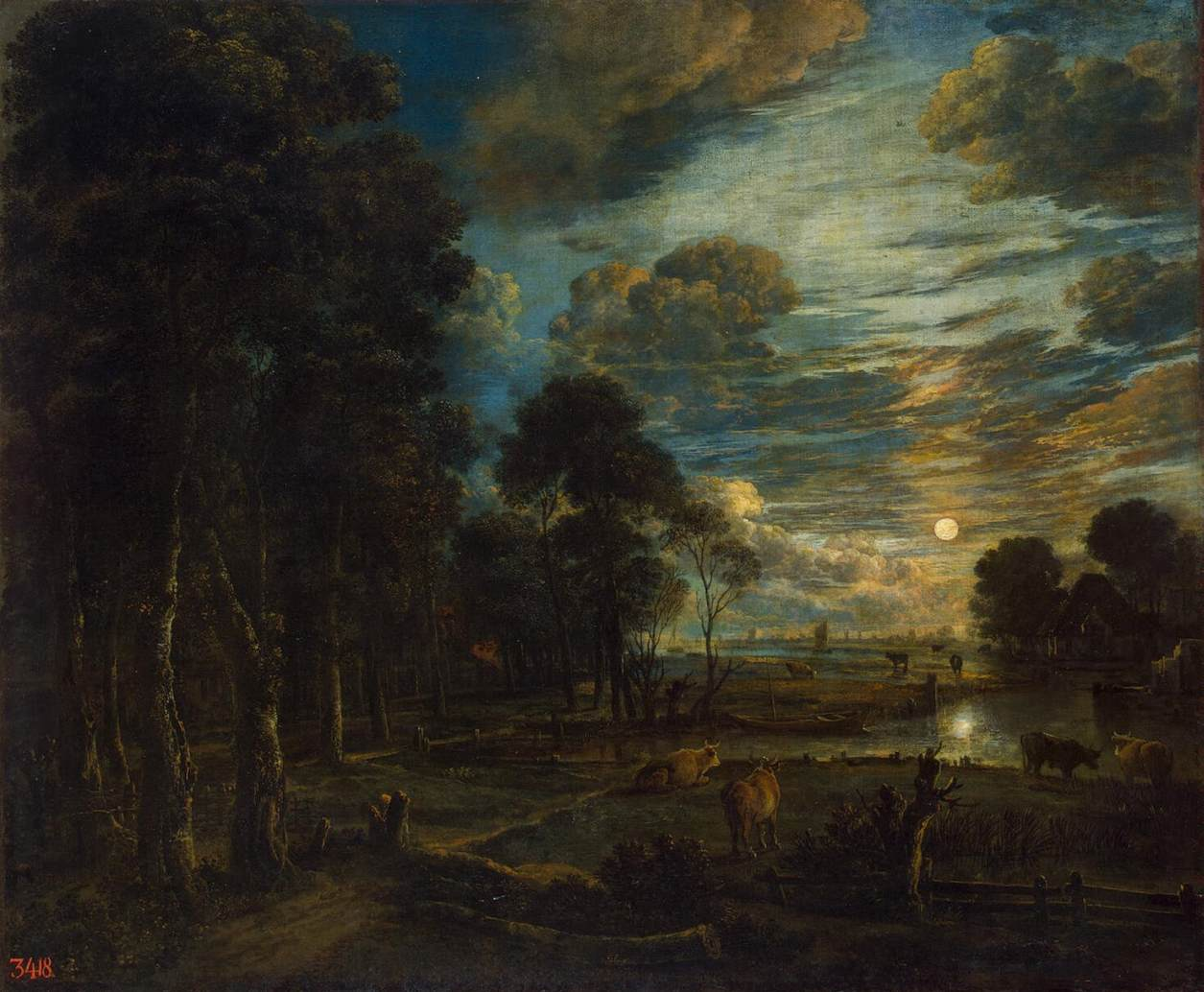
Night Landscape with a River

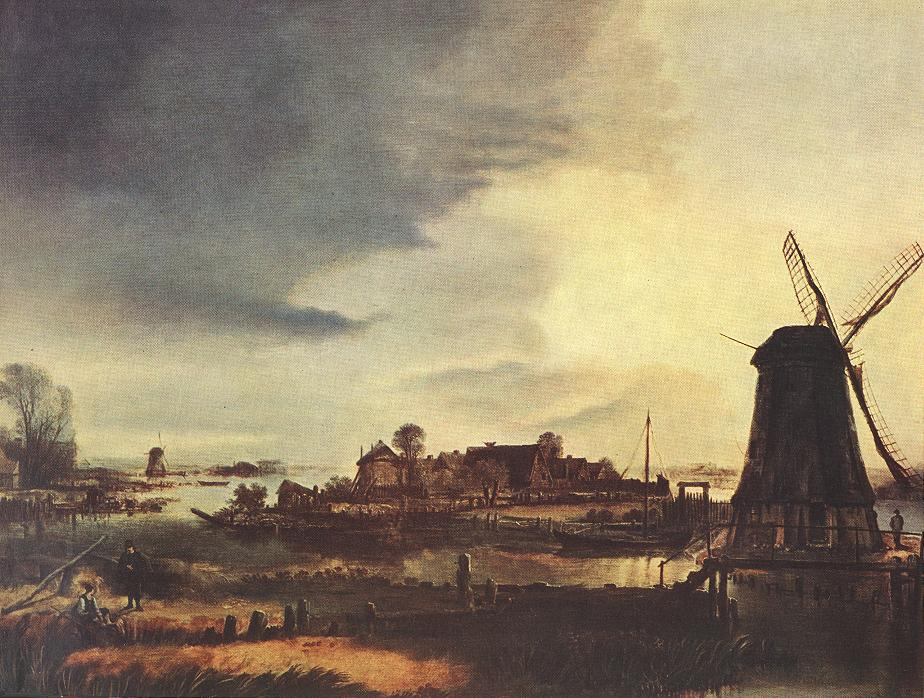
Landscape with Windmill

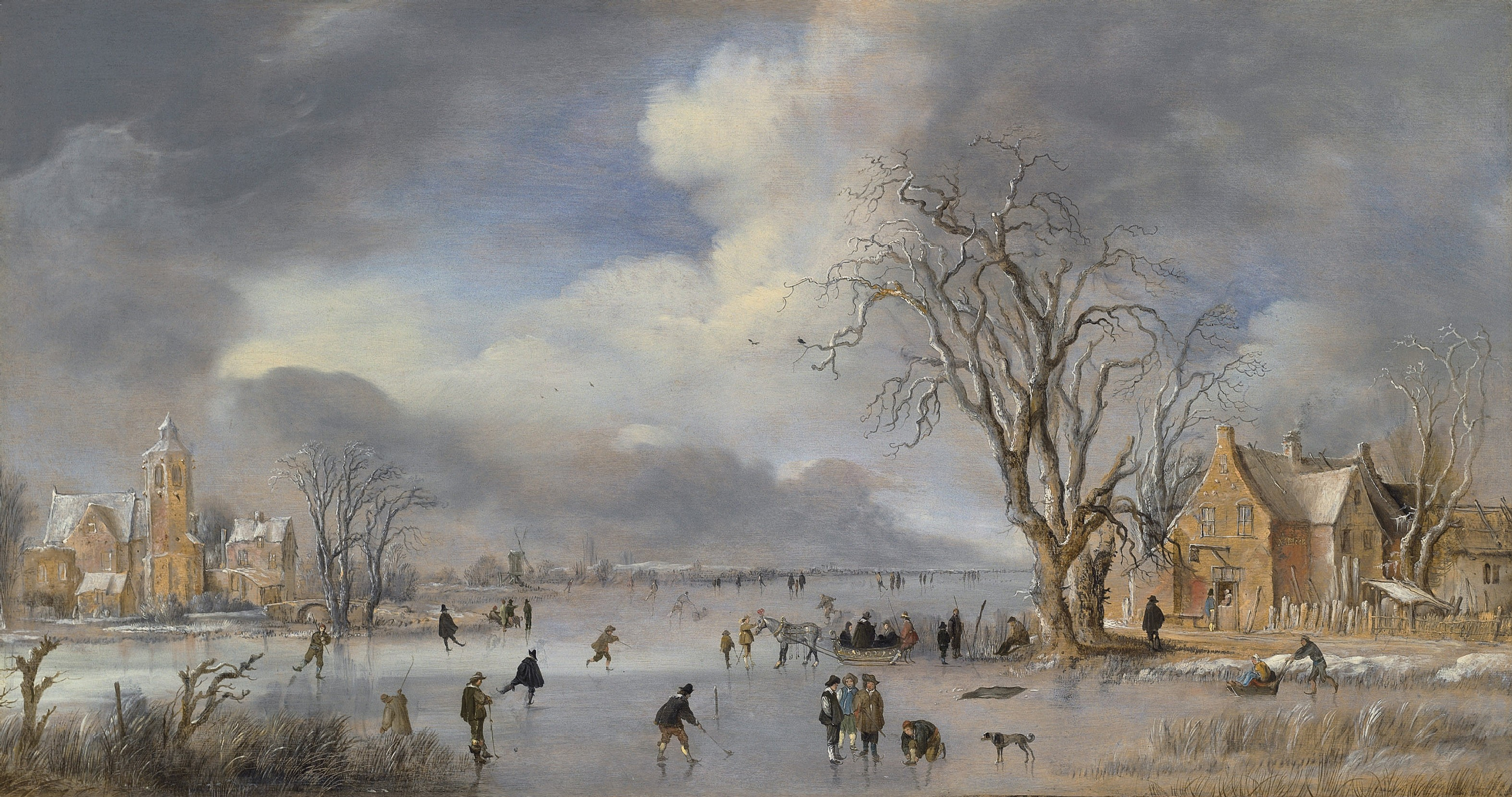
Winter Landscape with Skaters

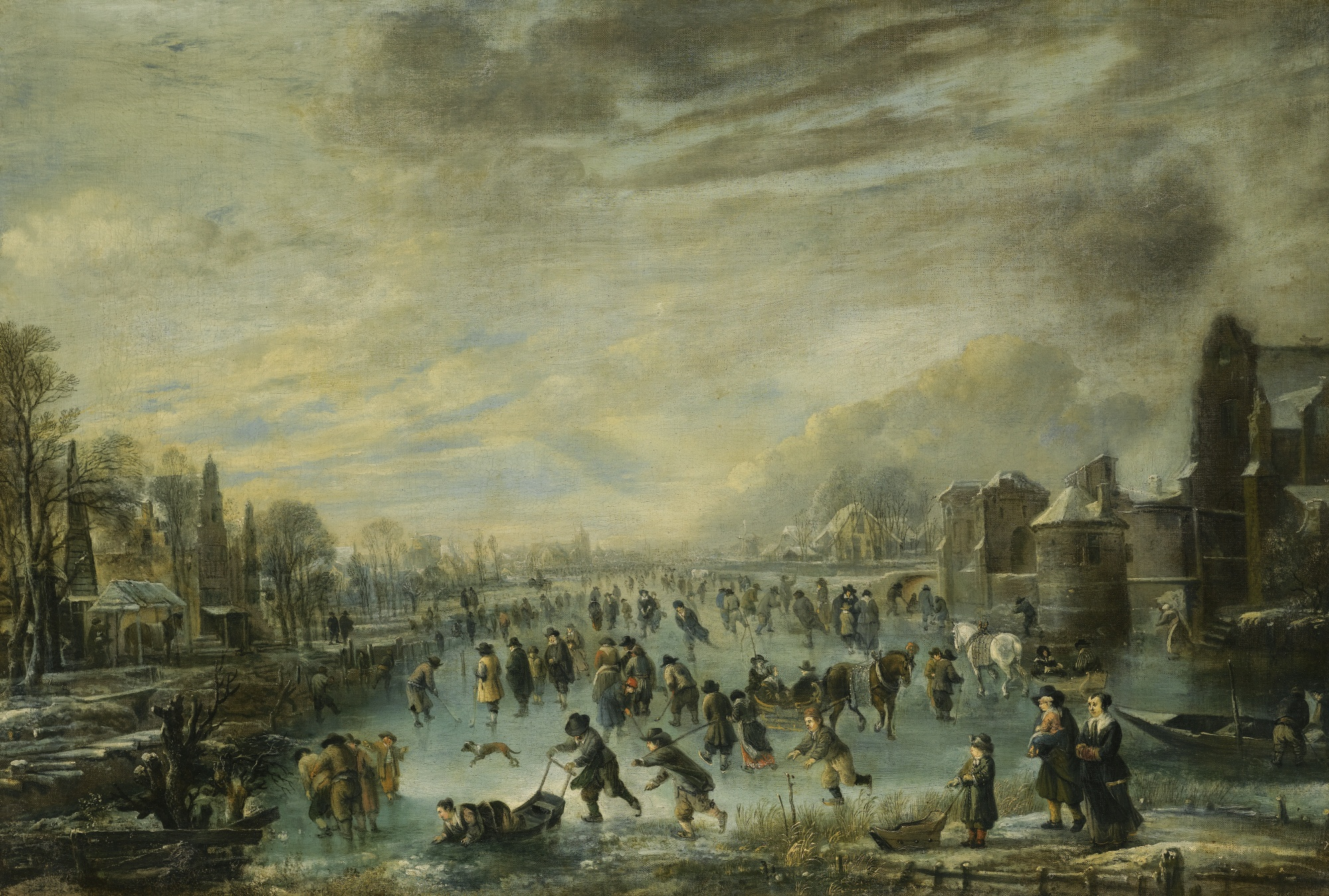
Winter Landscape with Figures

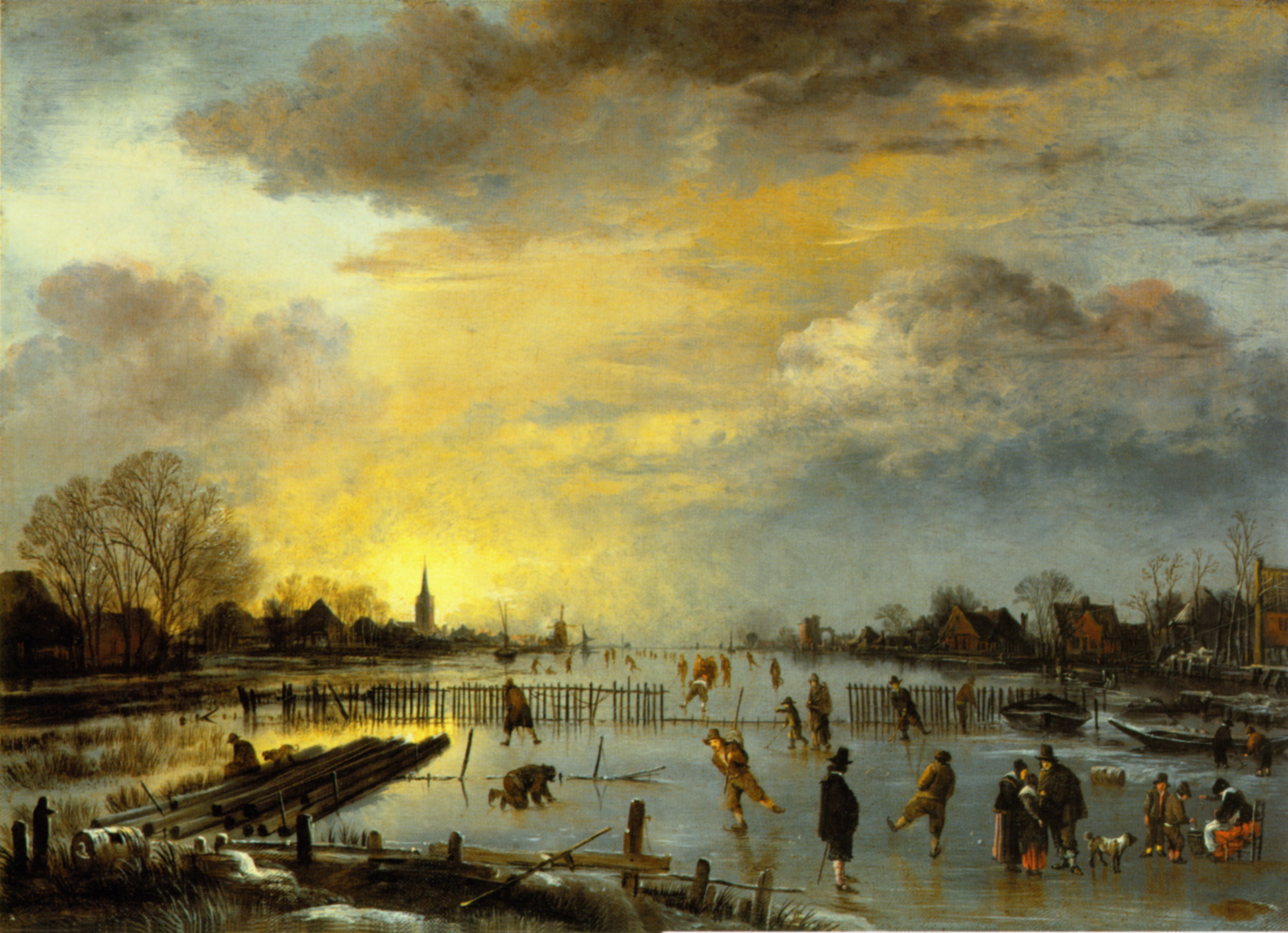
Winter Landscape

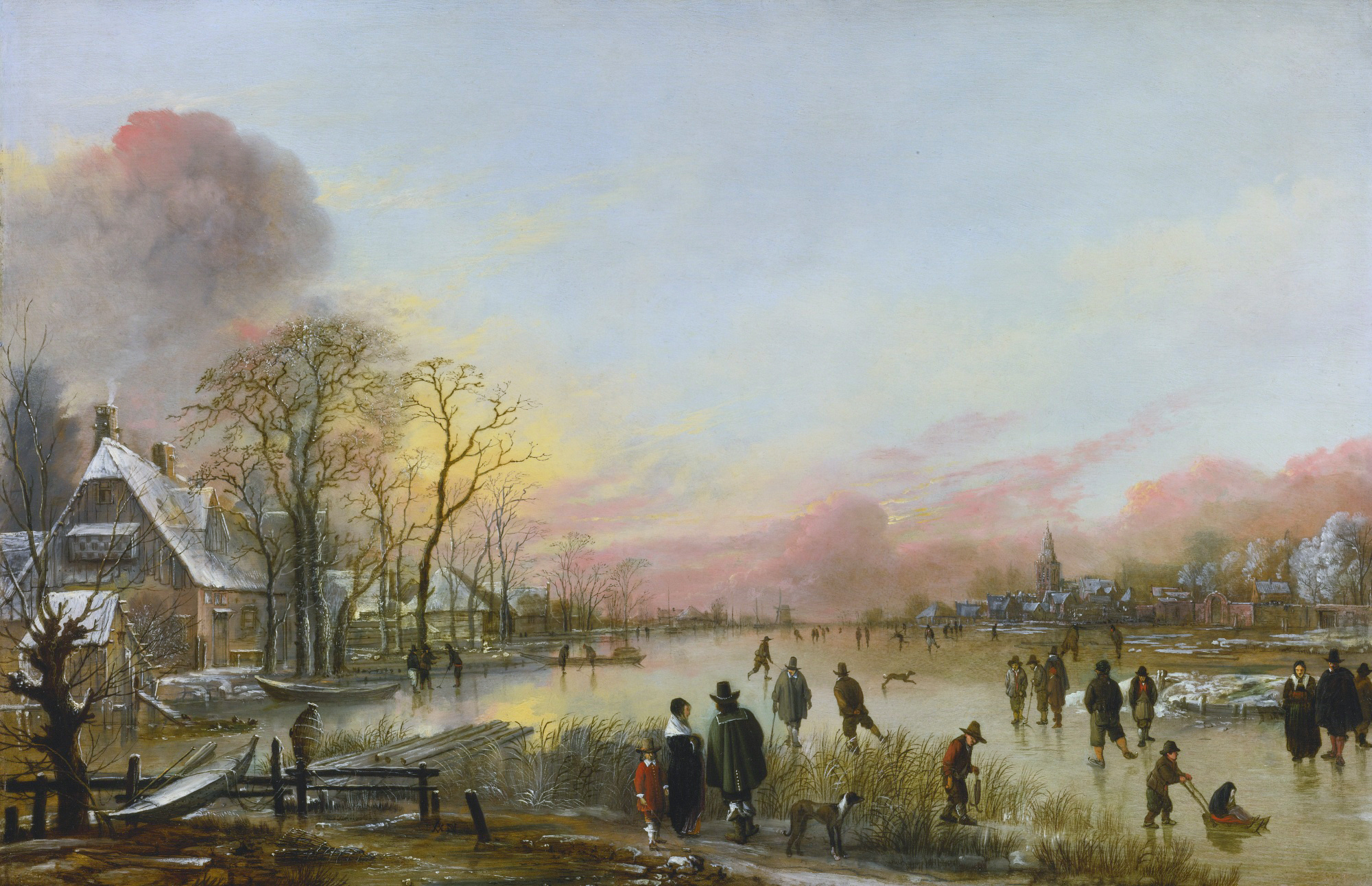
Frozen river at sunset

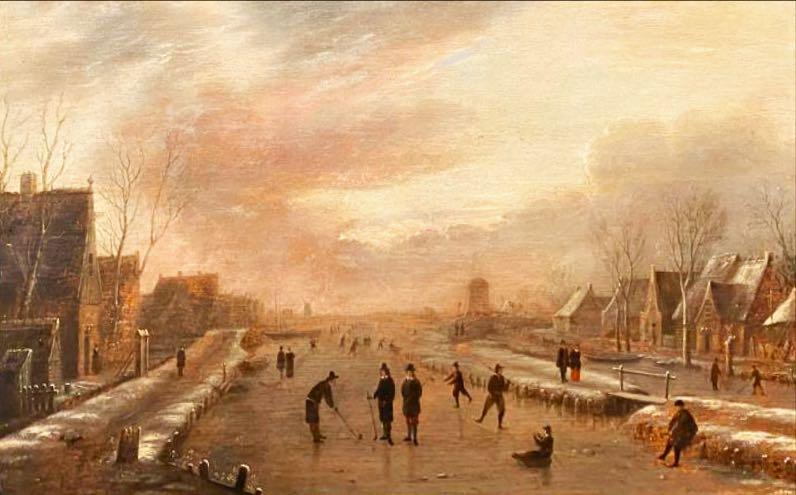
Winter Skating Scene

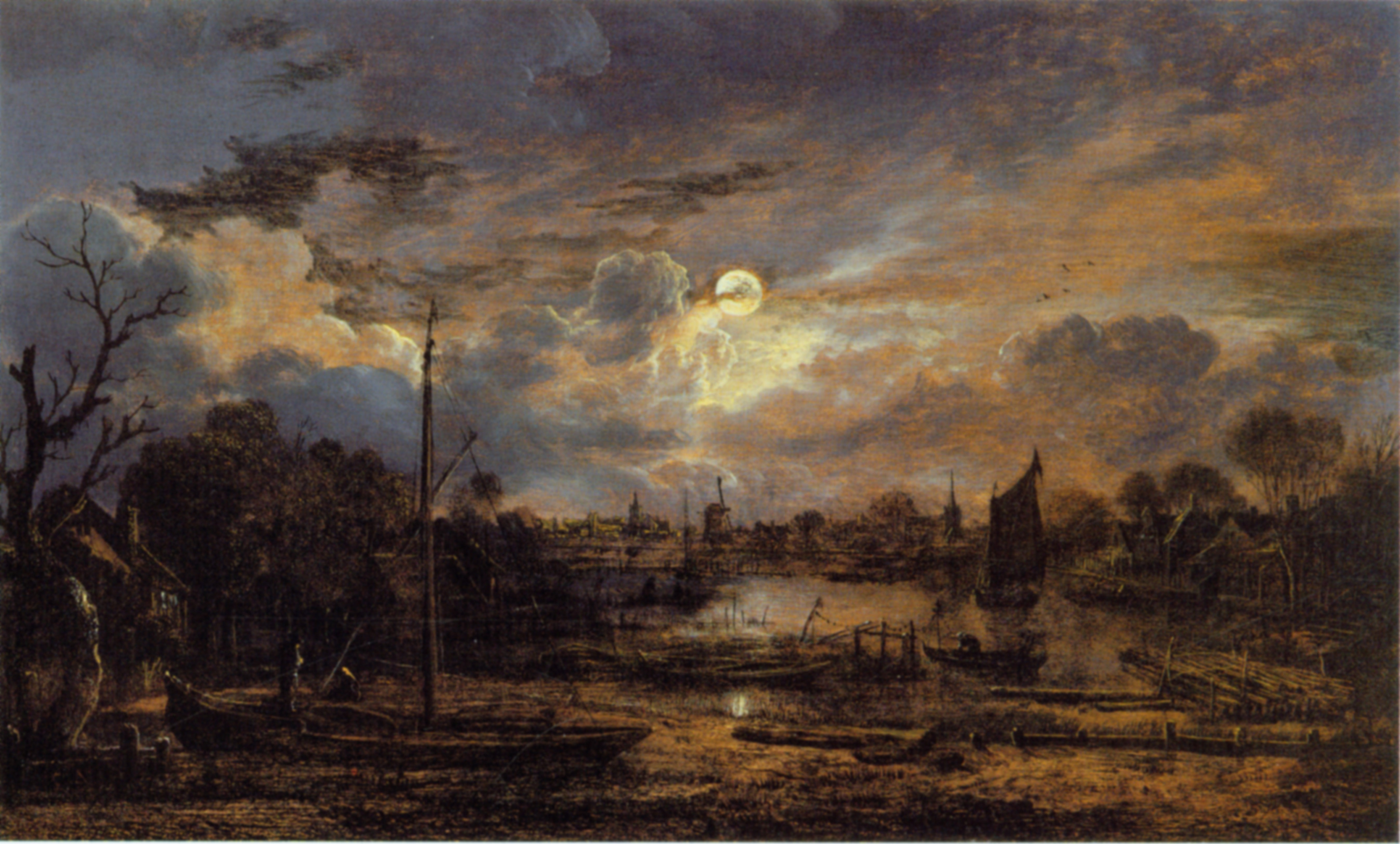
River landscape

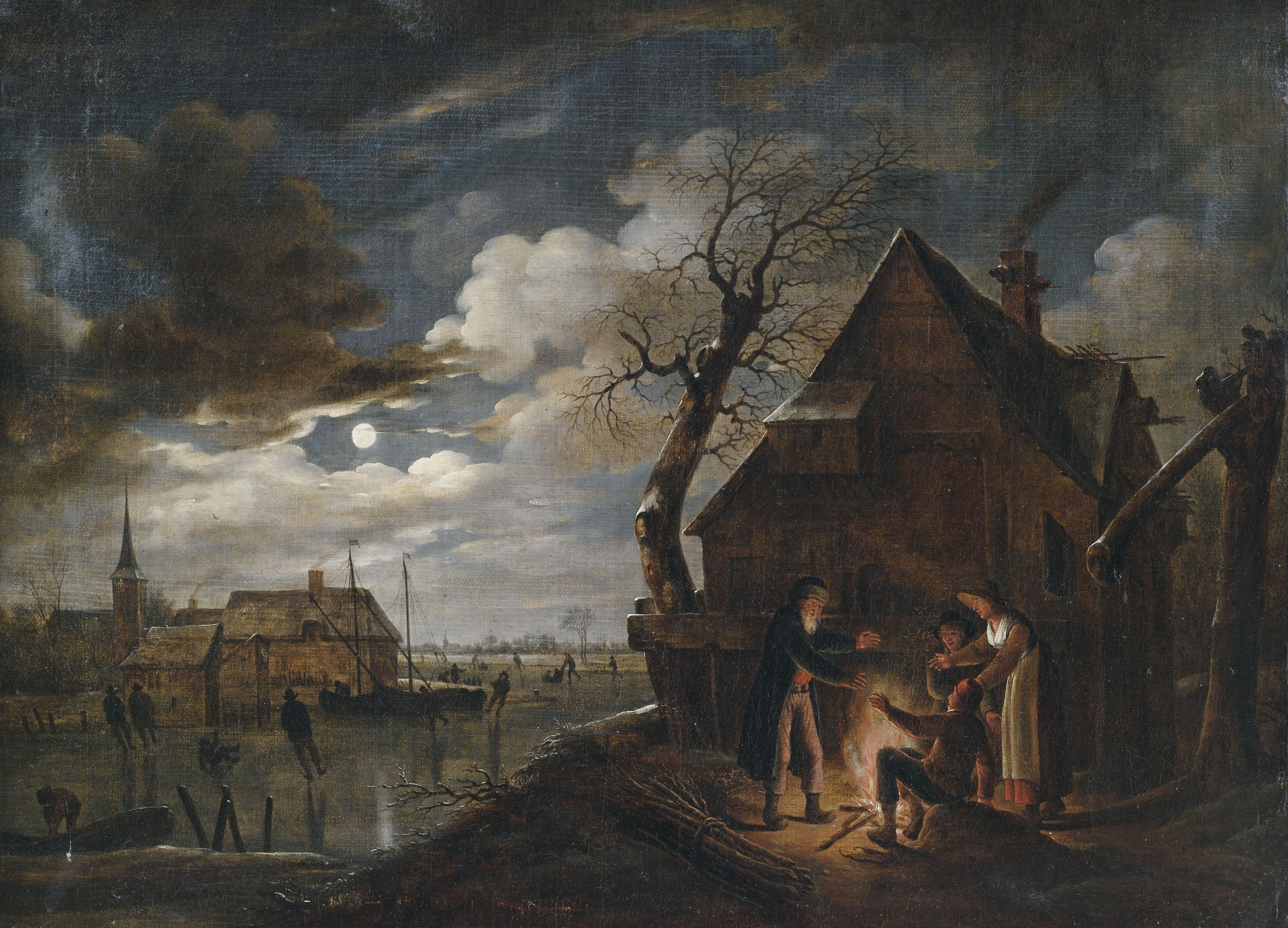
Dutch landscape in moonlight with figures
