= Govert Dircksz Camphuysen =

Dutch painter

- Born: 1624; Dokkum, Dutch Republic
- Died: July 4, 1672 (aged 47–48); Amsterdam, Dutch Republic
- Known for: Animal painter
- Style: Influenced by Paulus Potter
- Movement: Dutch Golden Age painting
- Parent: Dirck Rafaelsz Camphuysen (father)

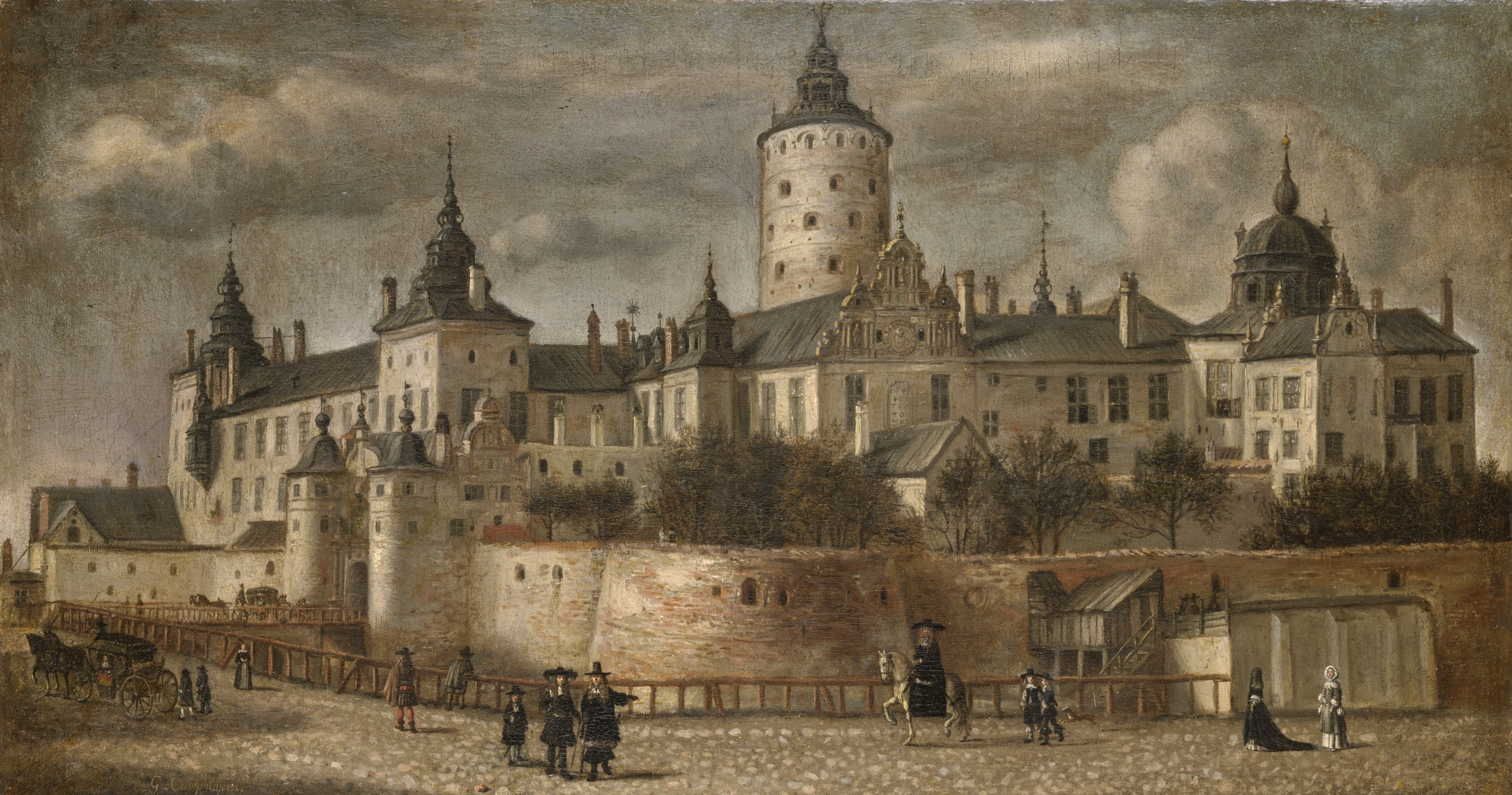
Castle Tre Kronor in Stockholm; painting from 1661.

Govert Dircksz Camphuysen or also spelled Govaert Camphuijsen (born at Dokkum in 1624, and died in Amsterdam in 1672) was an animal painter, whose style was influenced by Paulus Potter.

When his father, Dirck Rafaelsz Camphuysen died in 1627, his mother moved with the children to Amsterdam. Camphuyzen lived in the Jordaan. In 1643 he painted portraits. He married in 1647 and left the city around 1650, not long after he became a poorter. By that time he was living in Kalverstraat and may have faced financial trouble. He portrayed queen Hedvig Eleonora in Stockholm, but Camphuyzen is most famous for his stables, with farmers and farmers' wives.

A painting in the Dulwich Gallery of Peasants with cows before a cottage, with a forged signature of Paulus Potter, is attributed to Camphuysen; in the Rotterdam Museum is a picture of Peasants before an Inn, signed G. Camphuijsen; the Brussels Gallery has an 'Interior of a Farm,' signed with his name and dated 1650; and a painting of 'Peasants and Cattle before an Inn' in the Cassel Gallery is also attributed to him. In the Hermitage, St. Petersburg, are two Interiors of Cow-sheds, both bearing his signature.

Govaert Camphuysen's works are scarce; probably some of them are known as paintings by Paulus Potter; and others are attributed to his father, Dirk Raphaelsz. He was buried on 4 July 1672 from his house on Lastage.

== See also ==
- Tre Kronor Castle, seen from the southwest
