= Paulus Potter =

Dutch painter (1625–1654)

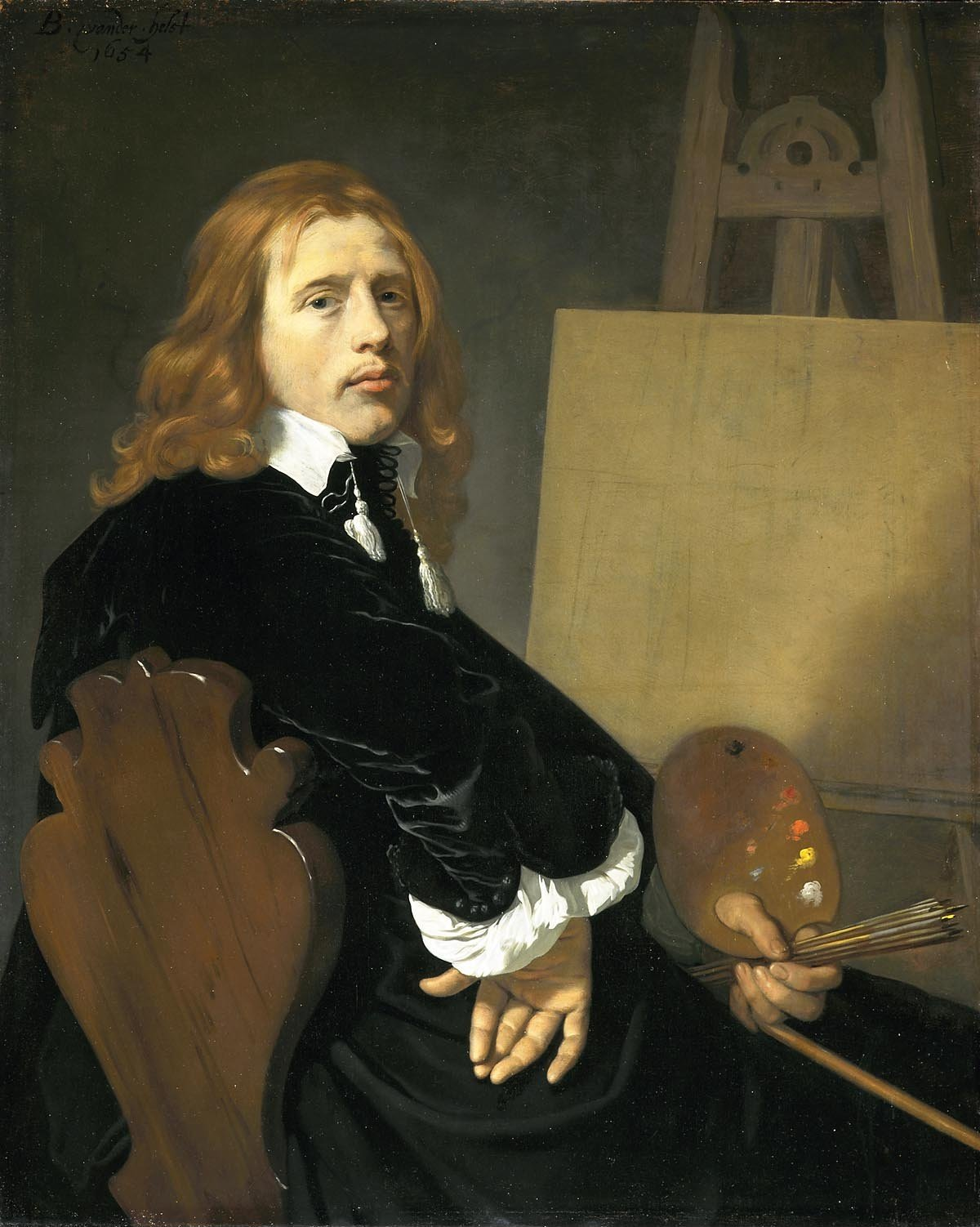
- Portrait of Paulus Potter (1654) by Bartholomeus van der Helst
- Born: 20 November 1625 (baptised); Enkhuizen, Dutch Republic
- Died: 17 January 1654 (buried); Amsterdam, Dutch Republic
- Education: Pieter Symonsz Potter
- Known for: Painting

Paulus Potter (Dutch pronunciation: [ˈpʌulʏs ˈpɔtər]; 20 November 1625 (baptised) – 17 January 1654 (buried)) was a Dutch painter who specialized in landscapes featuring animals, often from a low vantage point.

Before Potter died of tuberculosis at the age of 28 he produced about 100 paintings, working continuously.

== Life ==
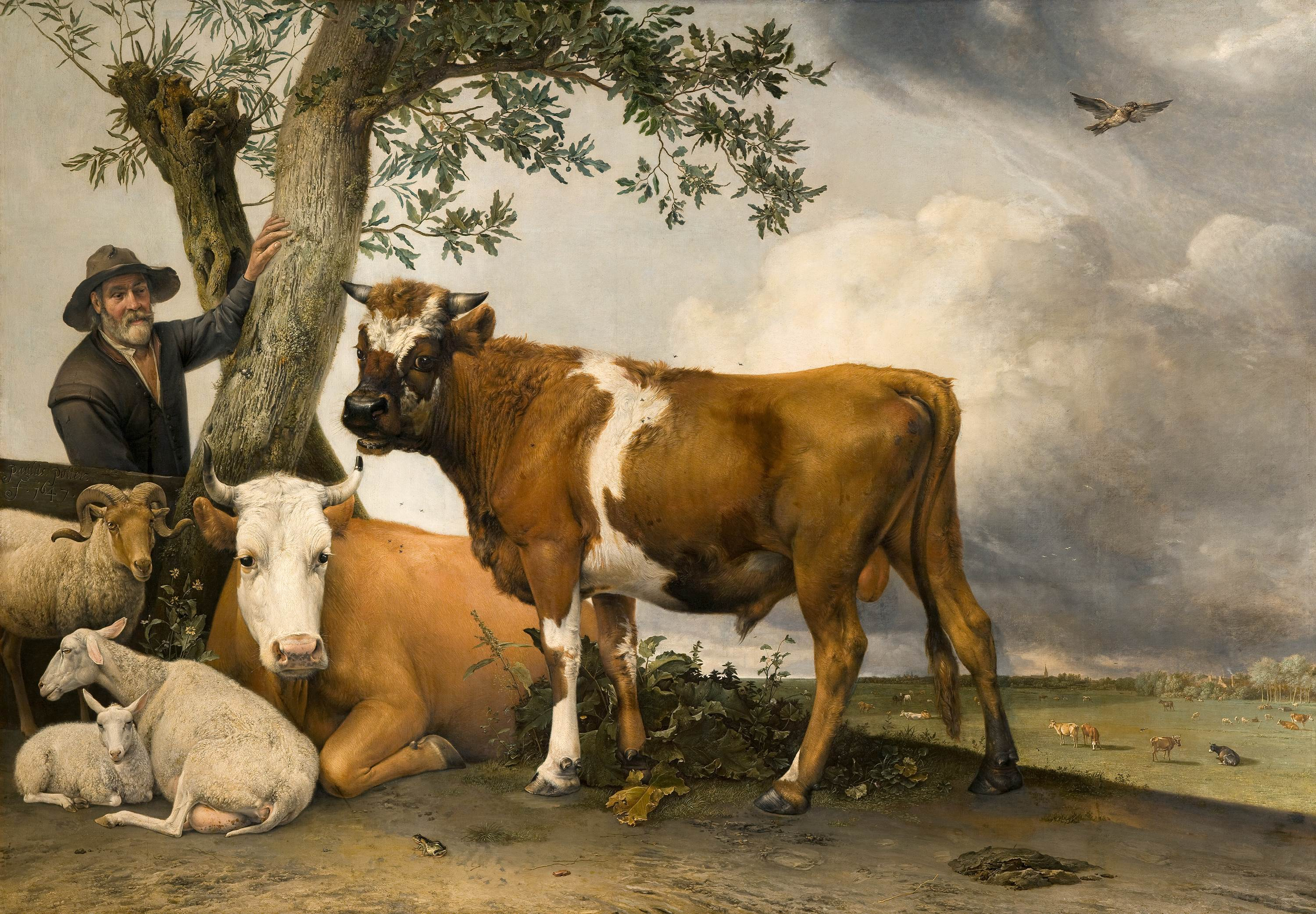
The painting The Young Bull (1647) is in the collection of the Mauritshuis

Paulus Potter was born in Enkhuizen. He was baptized on 20 November 1625. In 1628 his family moved to Leiden, and in 1631 to Amsterdam, where young Paulus studied painting with his father, Pieter Symonsz Potter. After his mother died, his father started an affair with the wife of Pieter Codde, also living in the fancy Sint Antoniesbreestraat. For some time his father was a manufacturer of gilded leather hangings outside the city walls.

Potter became a member of the Guild of Saint Luke in Delft, but by 1649, he moved to The Hague, next to Jan van Goyen. In July 1650, Potter married Adriana van Balckeneynde (1627–1690). His father-in-law was a leading building contractor in the Hague and introduced him to the Dutch elite. Amalia of Solms-Braunfels, a member of the stadholder's family and an art-lover, bought one of Potter's paintings, The Farmyard, but some court ladies seemed to have advised against it. In May 1652, he returned to Amsterdam on invitation of Nicolaes Tulp, who owned a number of his paintings. Tulp was impressed by his civilized behavior and politeness and had Potter paint his son, Dirck Tulp, as a noble equestrian. Potter composed a will in January of 1653 and died a year later of tuberculosis, two months after his 28th birthday.

Paulus painted a self-portrait which was at Hackwood Park, Hampshire until 1998.

== Paintings ==
Potter's most famous painting is The Young Bull (circa 1647), and is not to be confused with his work The Bull. The Young Bull was composed after drawings Potter made in nature, and is now located in Mauritshuis in The Hague. Though this painting was criticized, it was greatly admired during the 19th century as an early example of Romanticism. The Young Bull features as the canvas being studied in Mark Tansey's 1981 monochromatic oil on canvas The Innocent Eye Test.

Paulus Potter's paintings

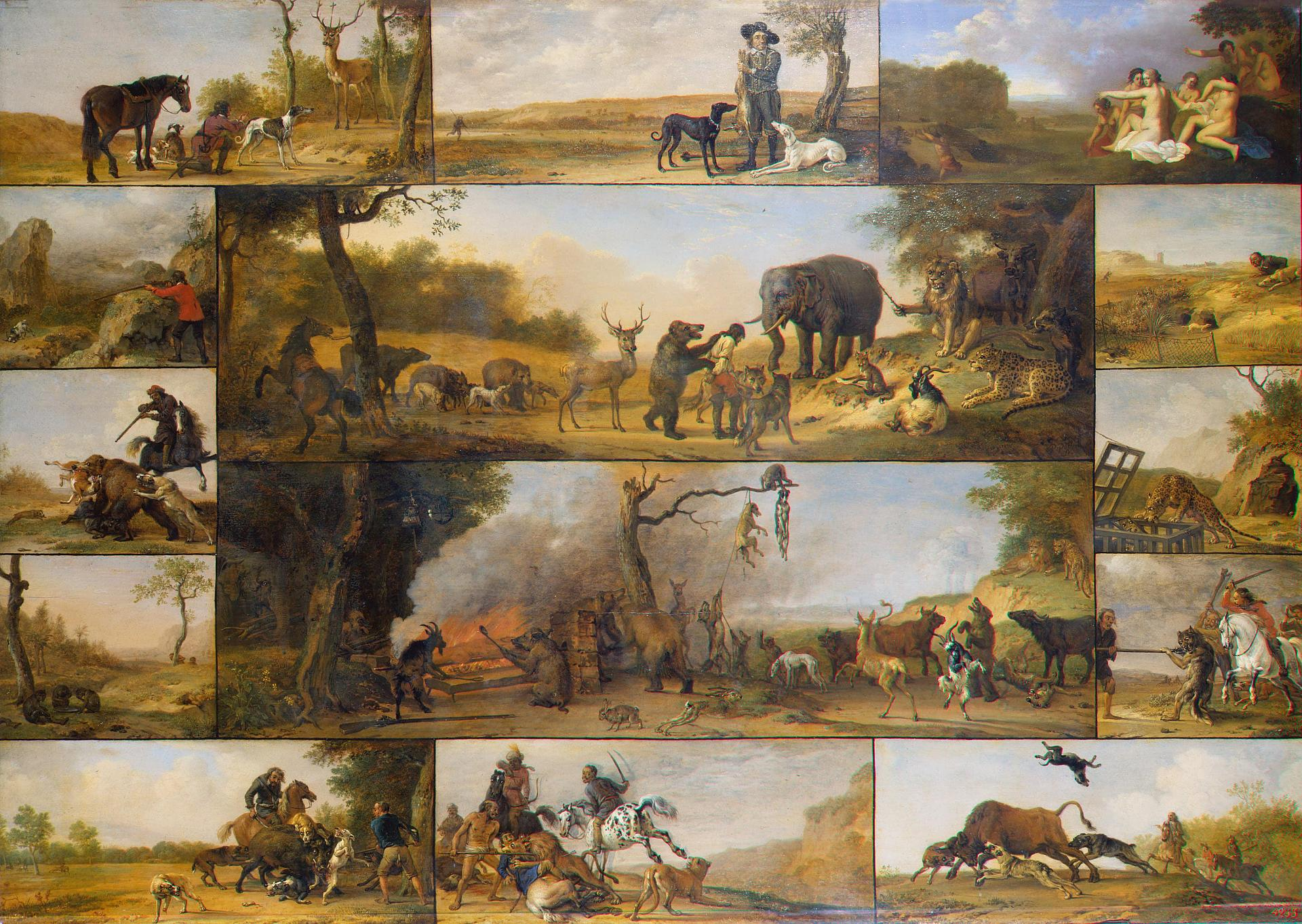
Punishment of a Hunter
(c. 1647)

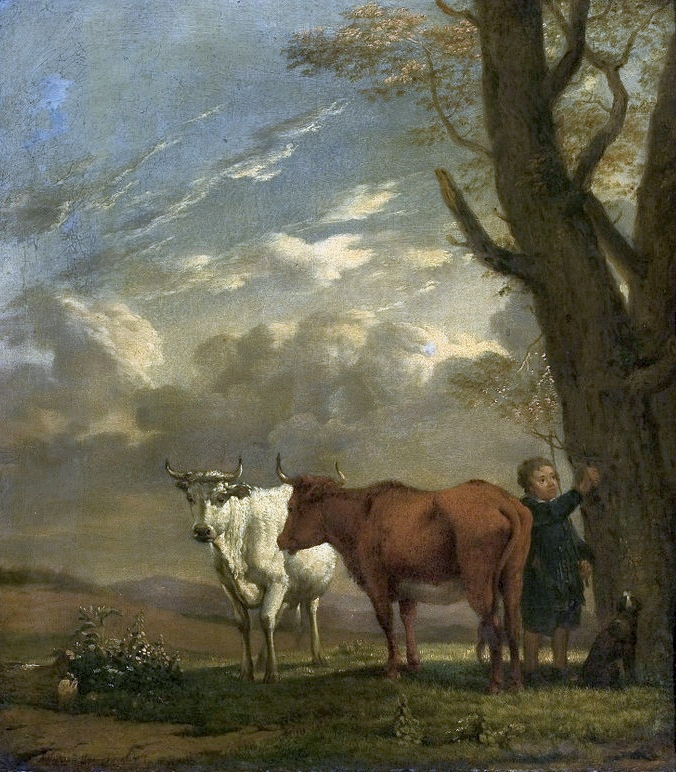
Shepherd Boy with Cows (1647)

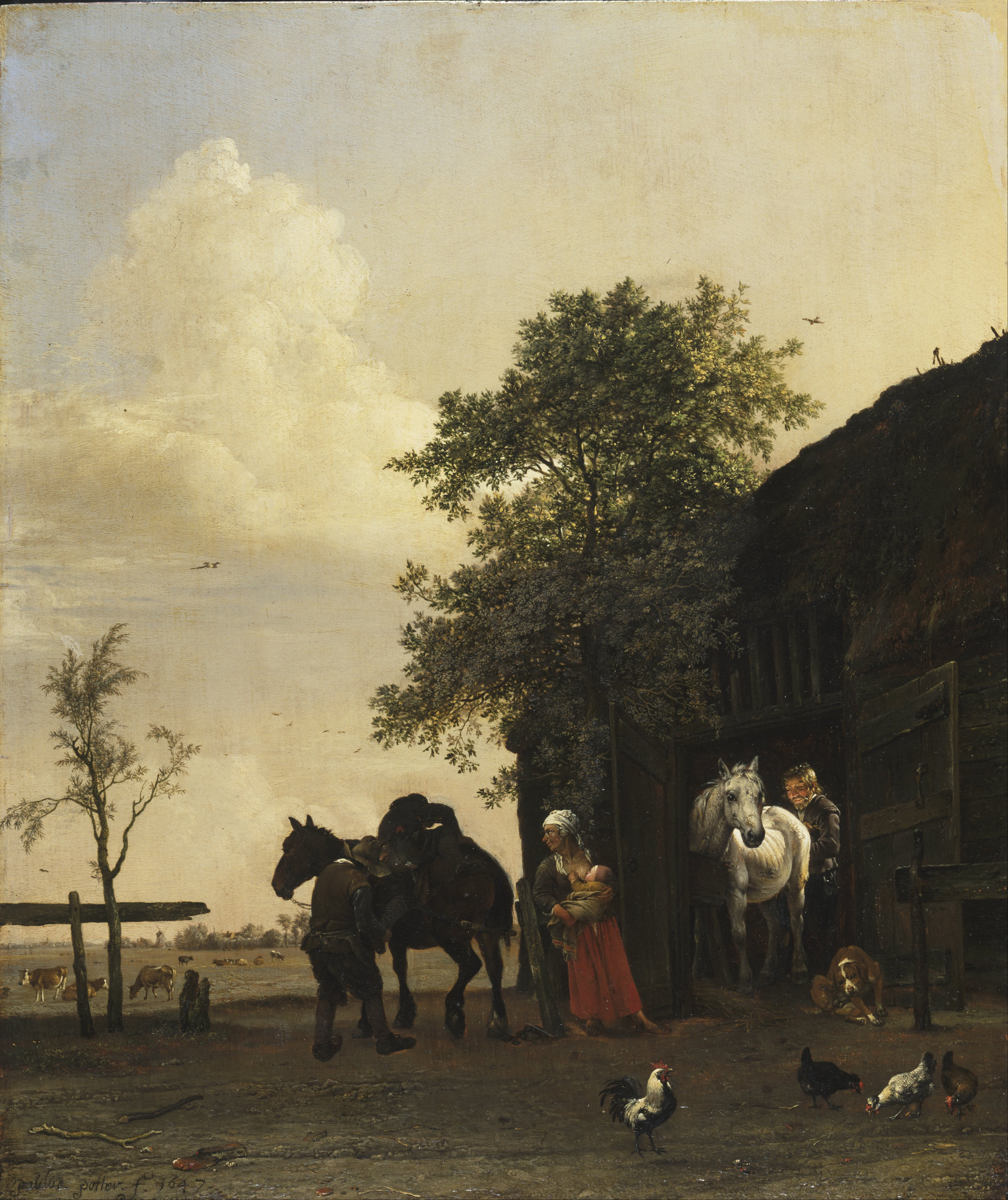
Figures with Horses by a Stable (1647)

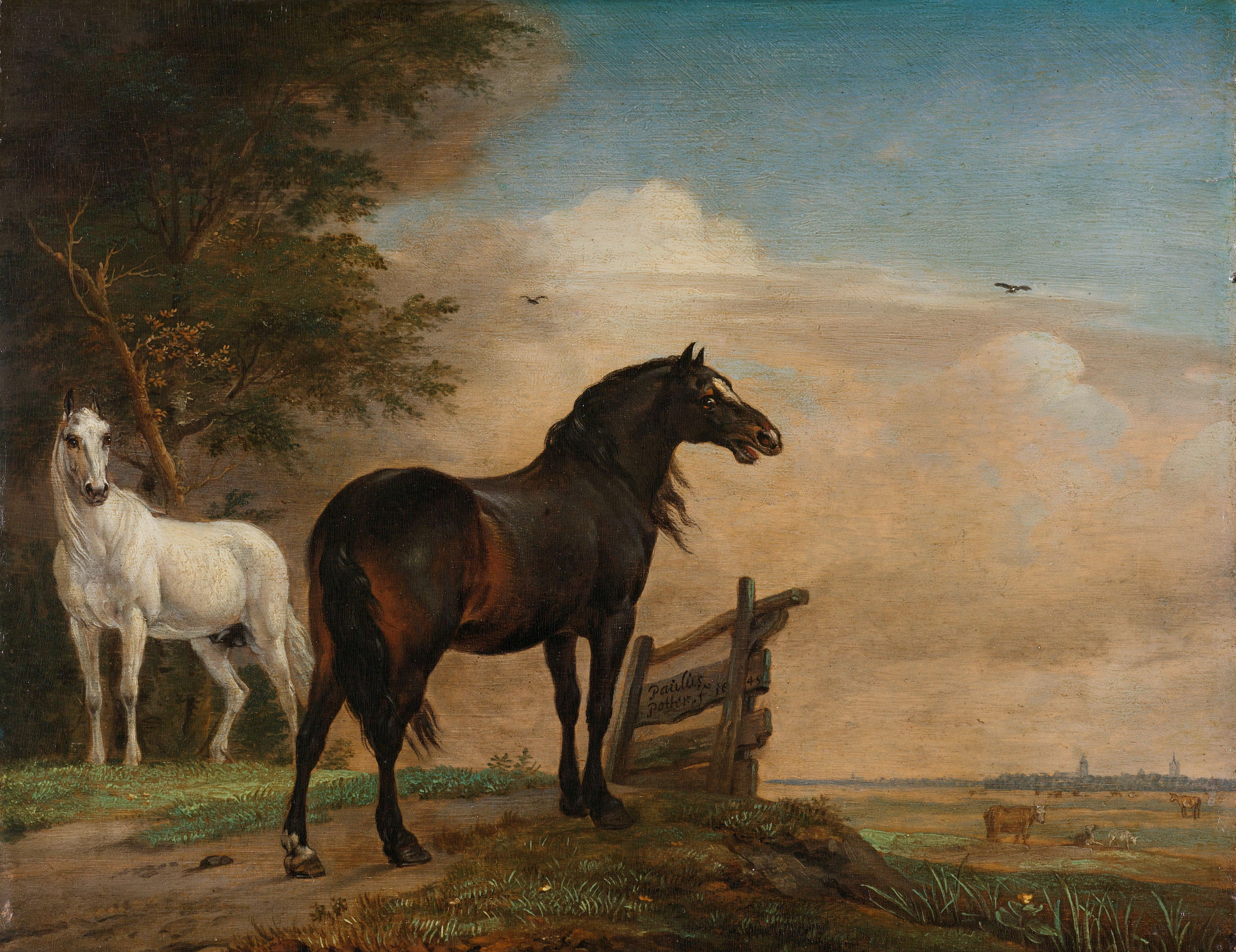
Two Horses in a Meadow near a Gate (1649)

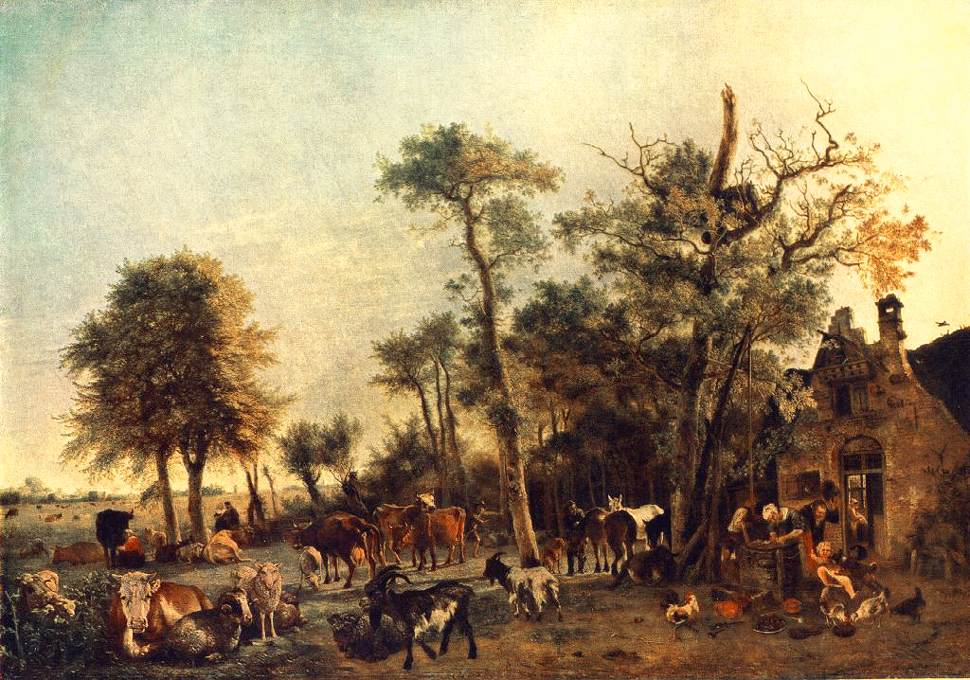
The Farmyard, 1649, formerly known as The Pissing Cow from the collection of Amalia van Solms (1649)

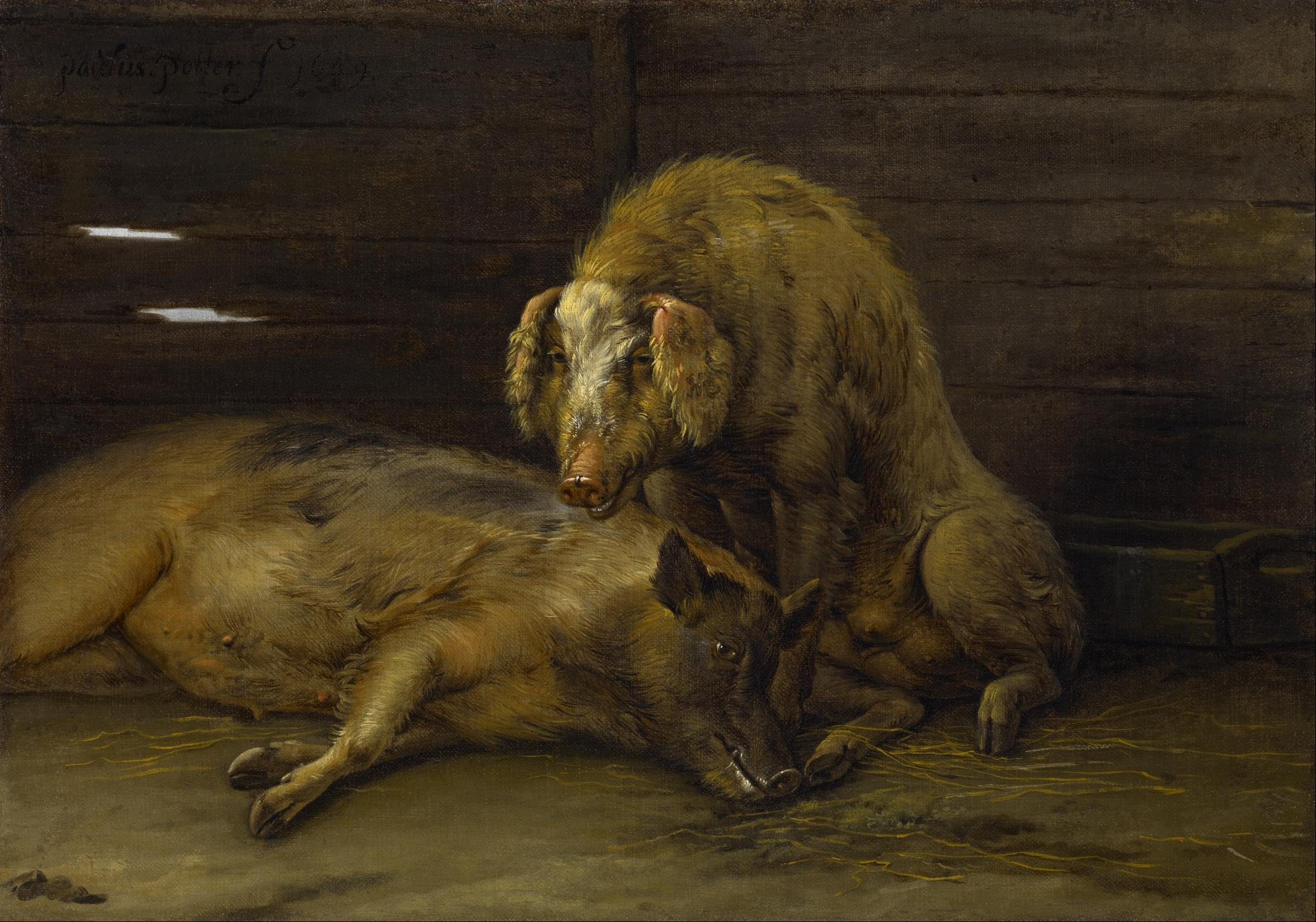
Two Pigs in a Sty (1649)

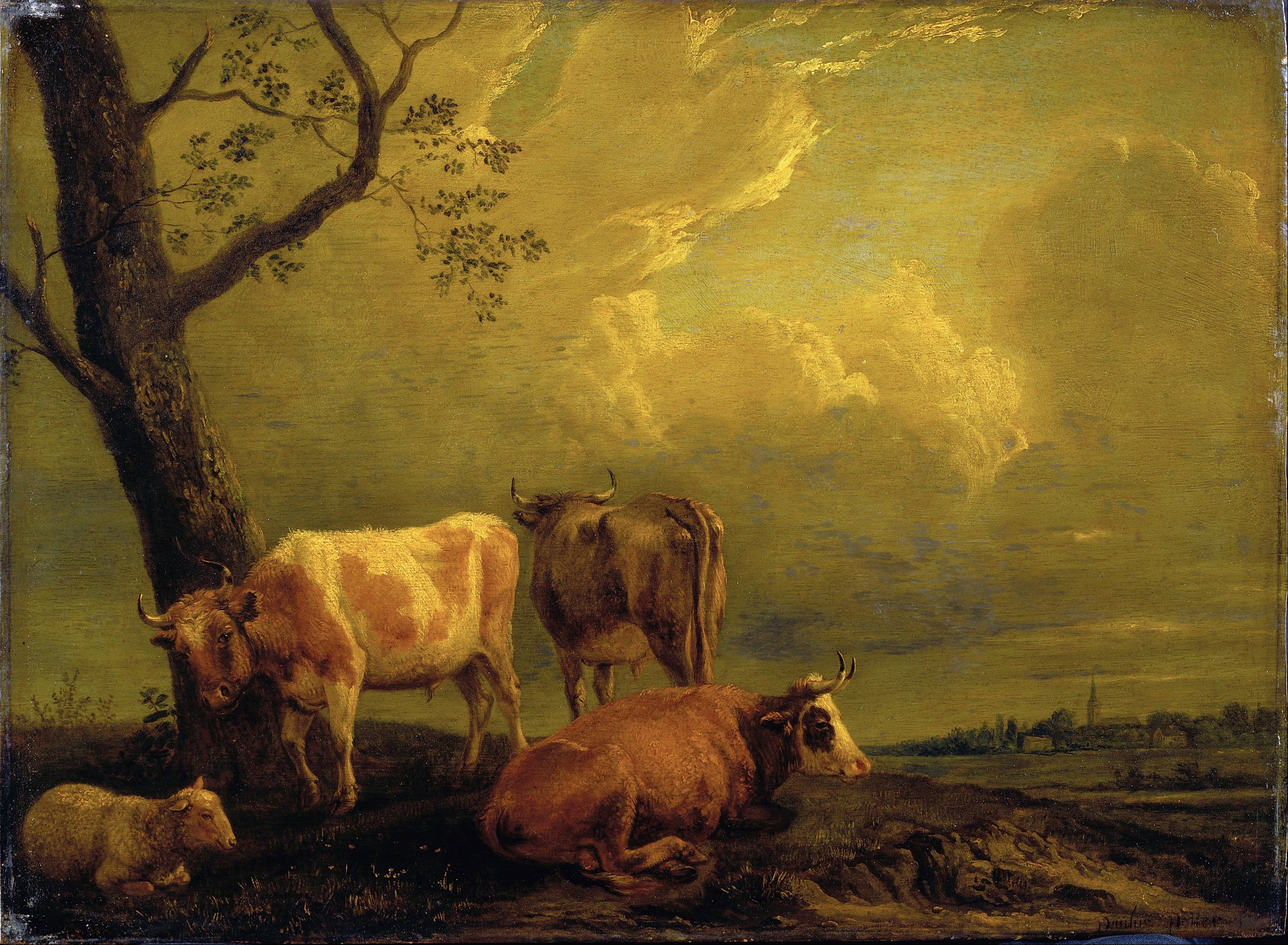
Cattle and Sheep
(after 1650)

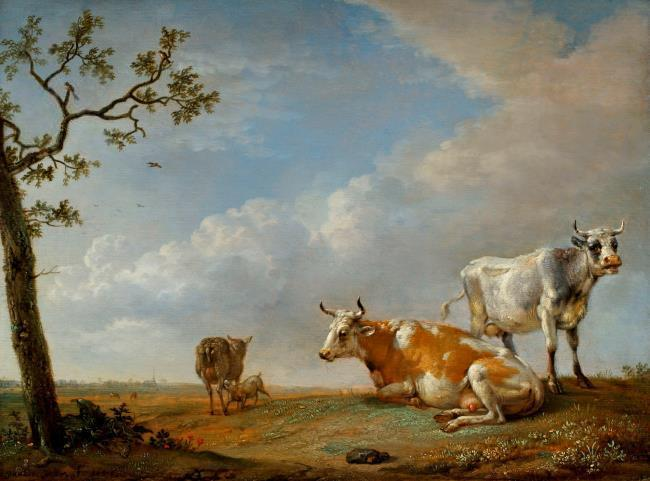
Cows Animals Resting in the Pasture (1650)

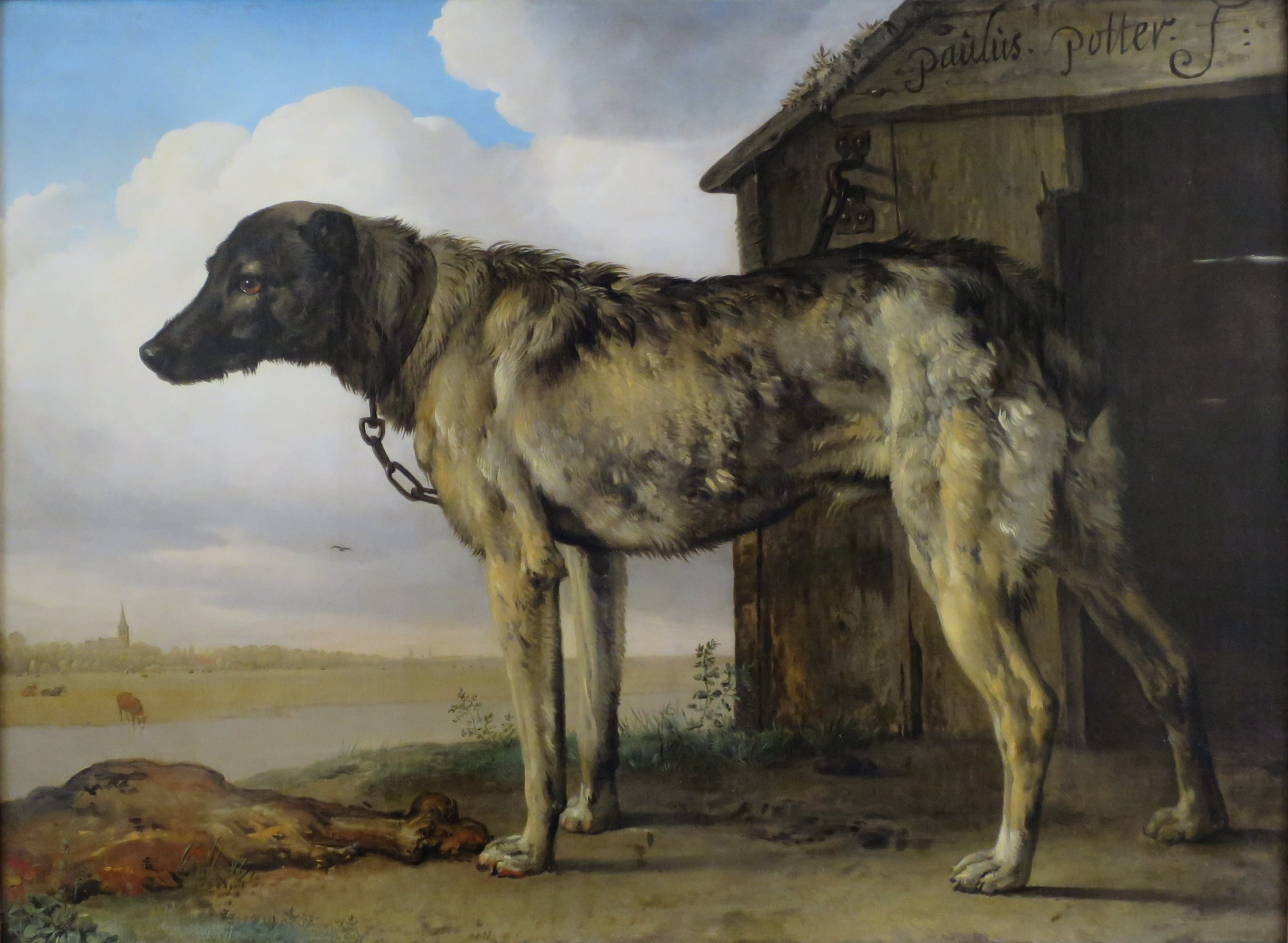
Wolf-Hound (c. 1650–1652)

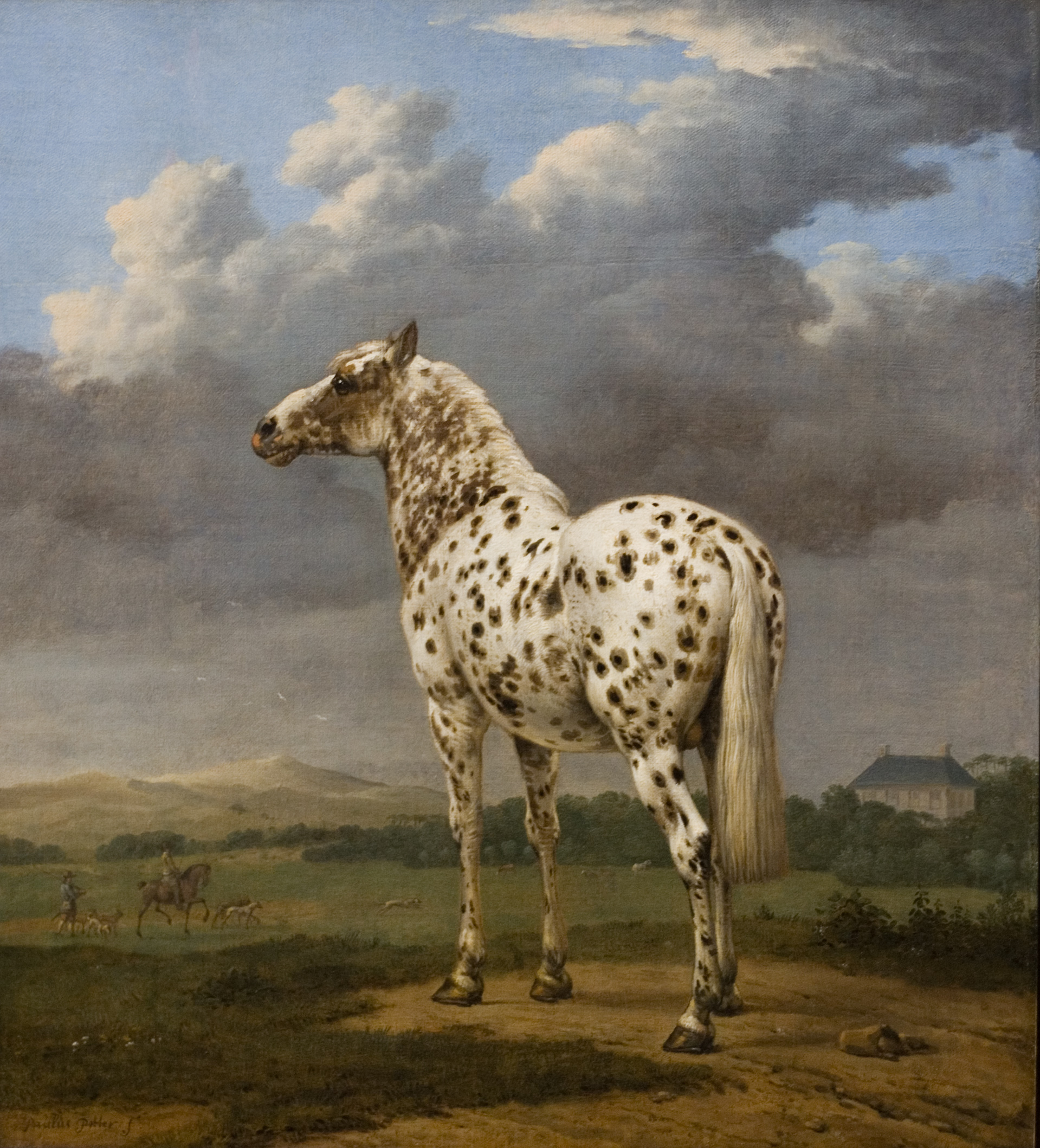
The Piebald Horse (c. 1650–1654)

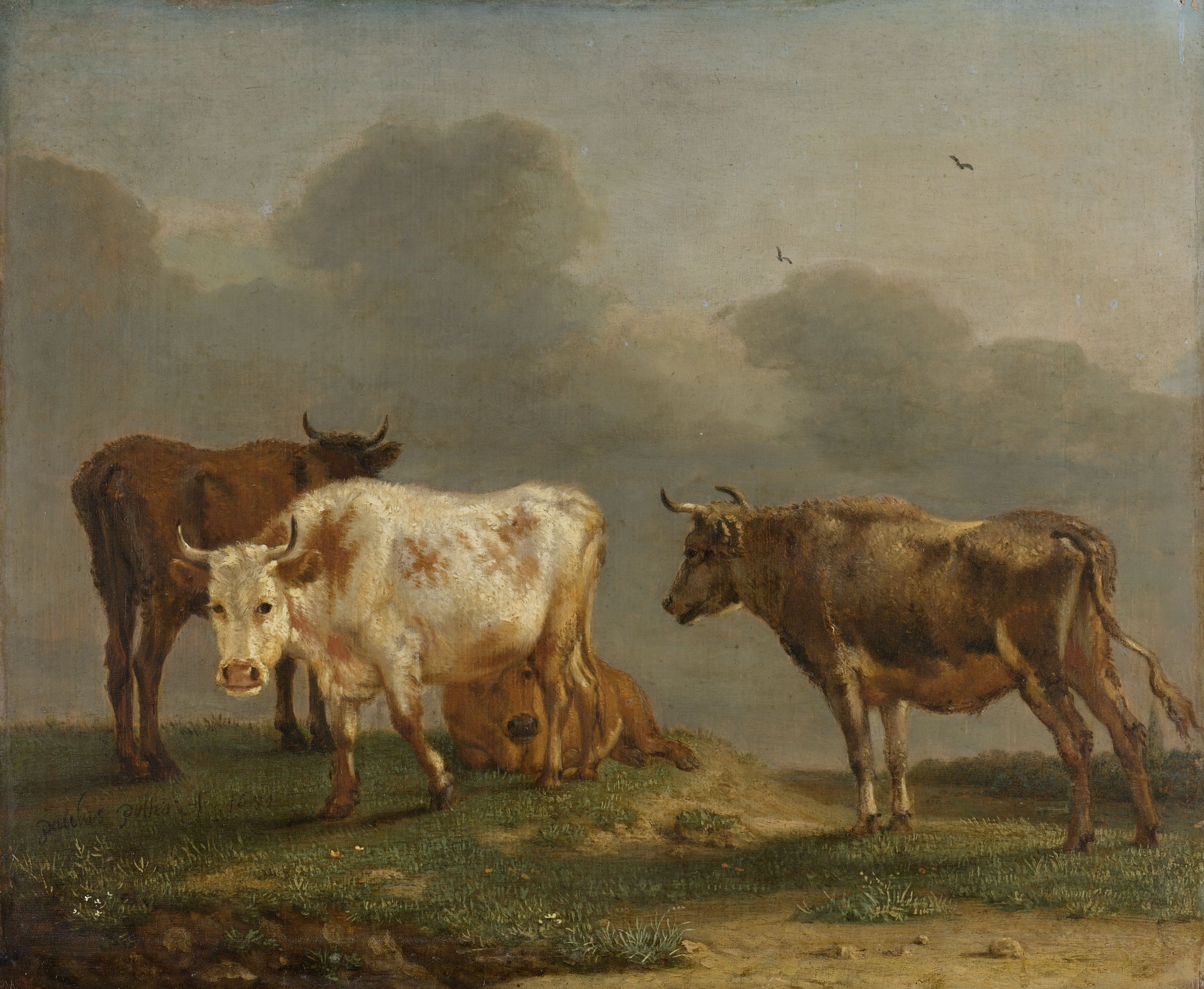
Four Cows in a Meadow (1651)

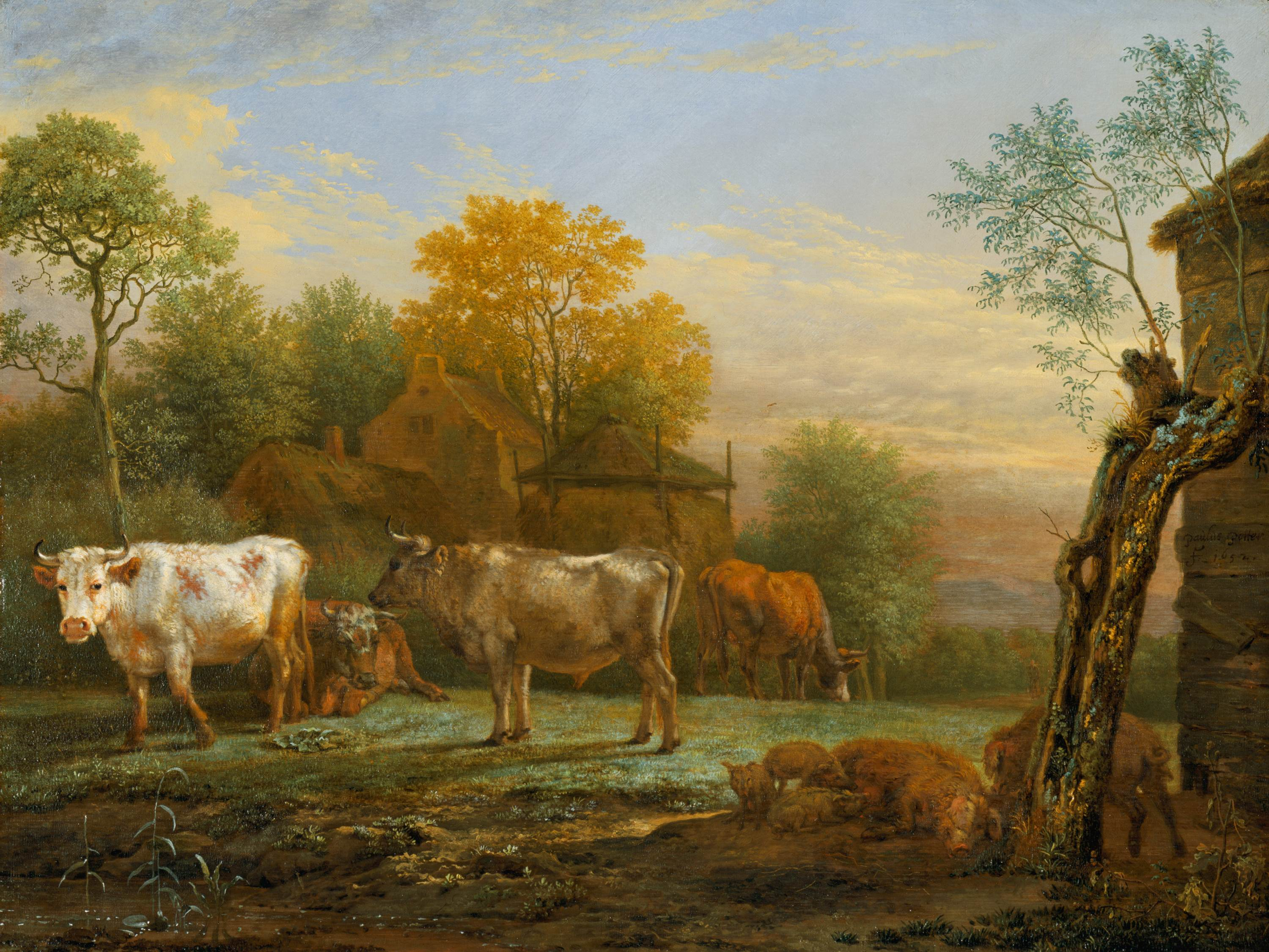
Cattle in a Meadow by Paulus Potter (1652)

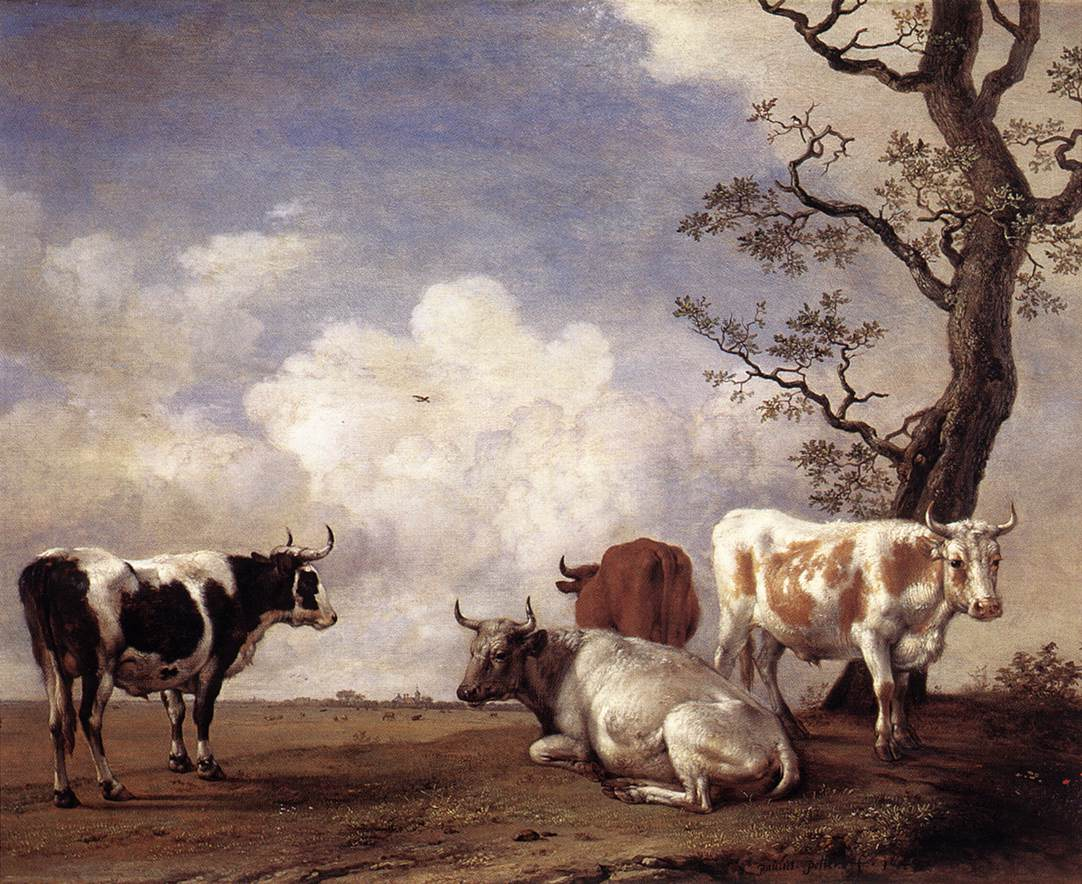
Four Bulls (unknown)

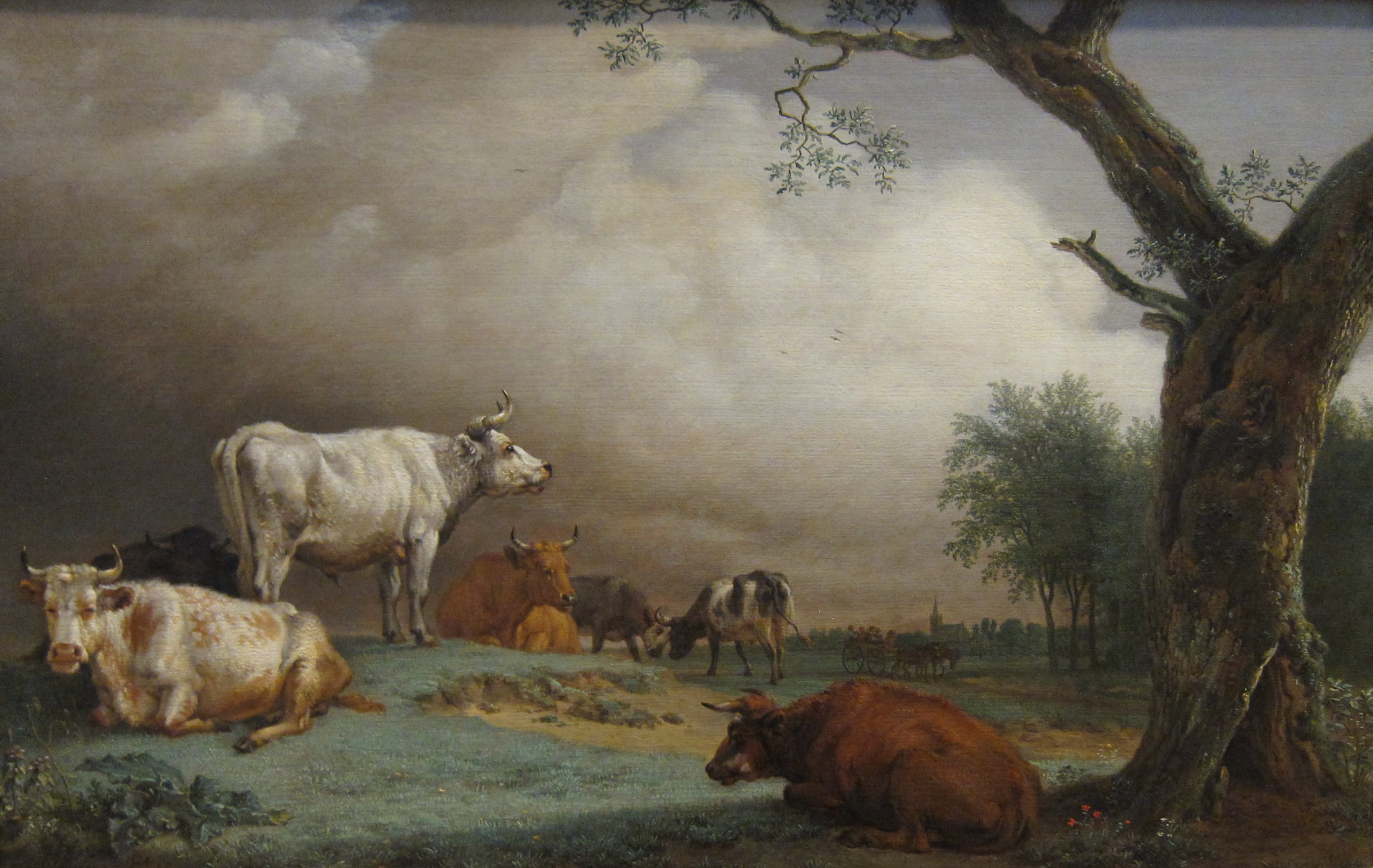
Cattle in a Meadow (1652)

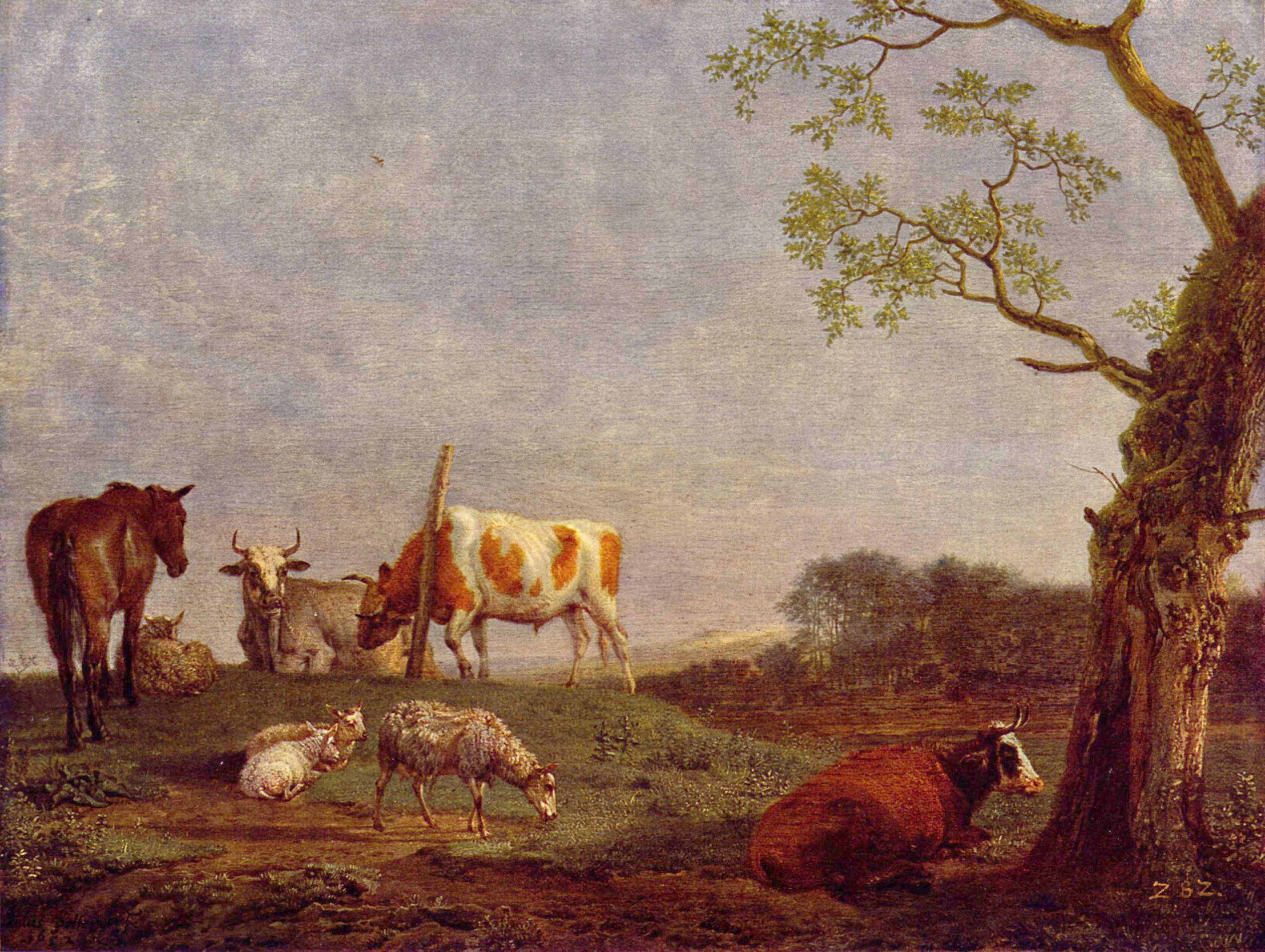
Resting Herd (1652)

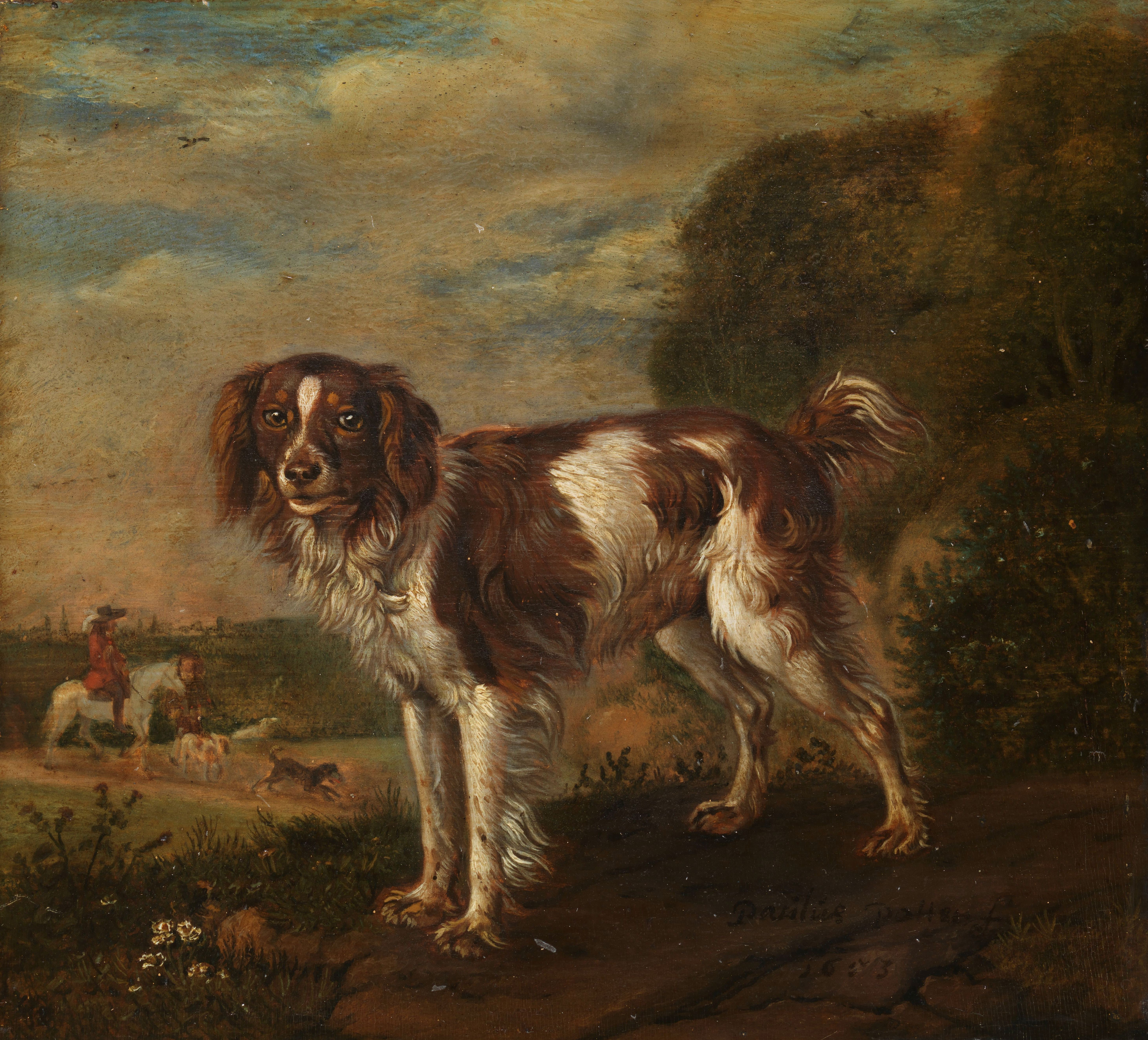
A spaniel (1653)

== Memorials ==
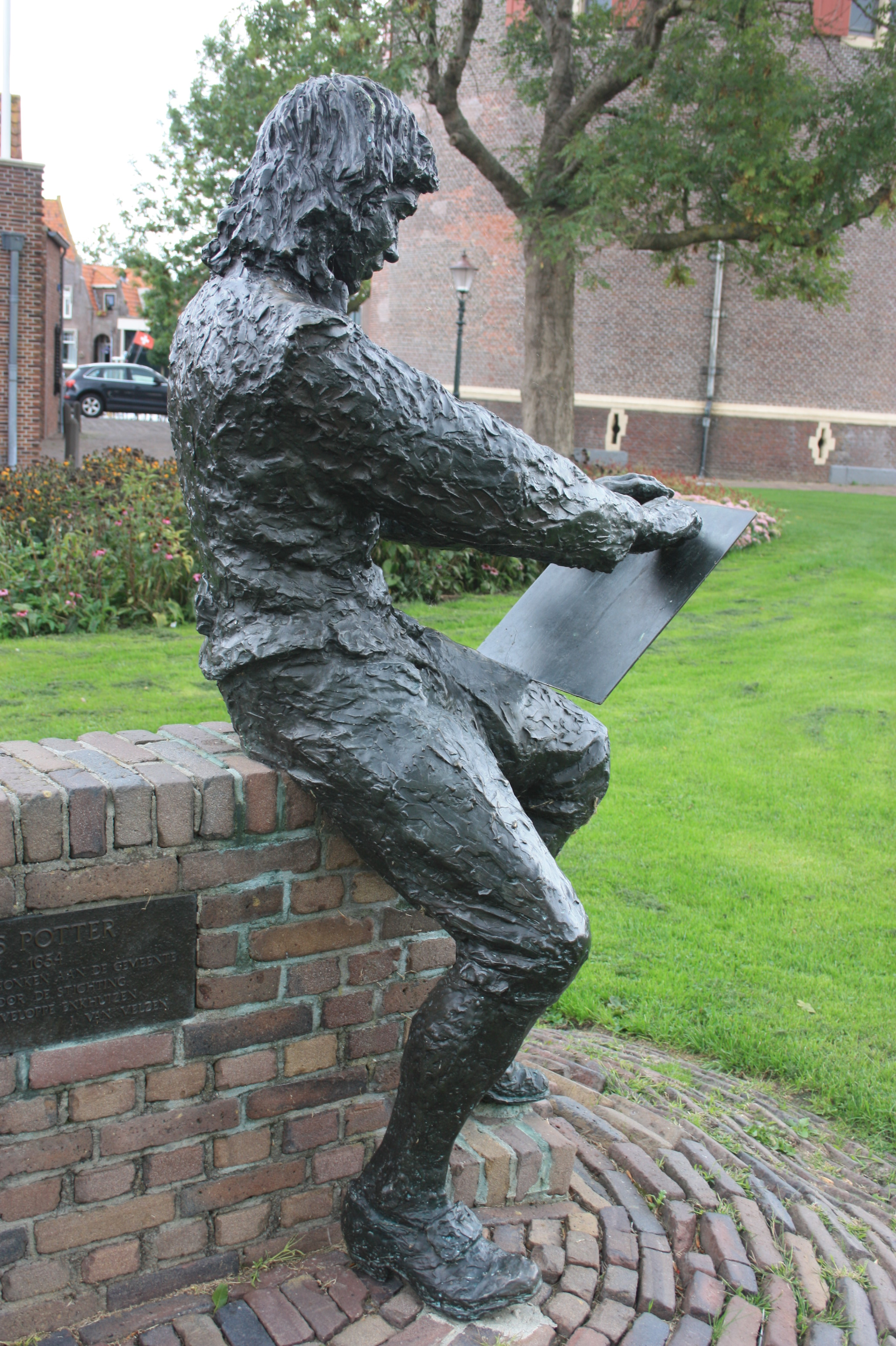
Statue of Paulus Potter at the Drommedaris in Enkhuizen

A statue of Potter (sketching a distant statue of a goat) was erected at the Drommedaris in Enkhuizen in 1991.
