= Hendrik Verschuring =

Dutch Golden Age landscape painter

Hendrick Verschuring
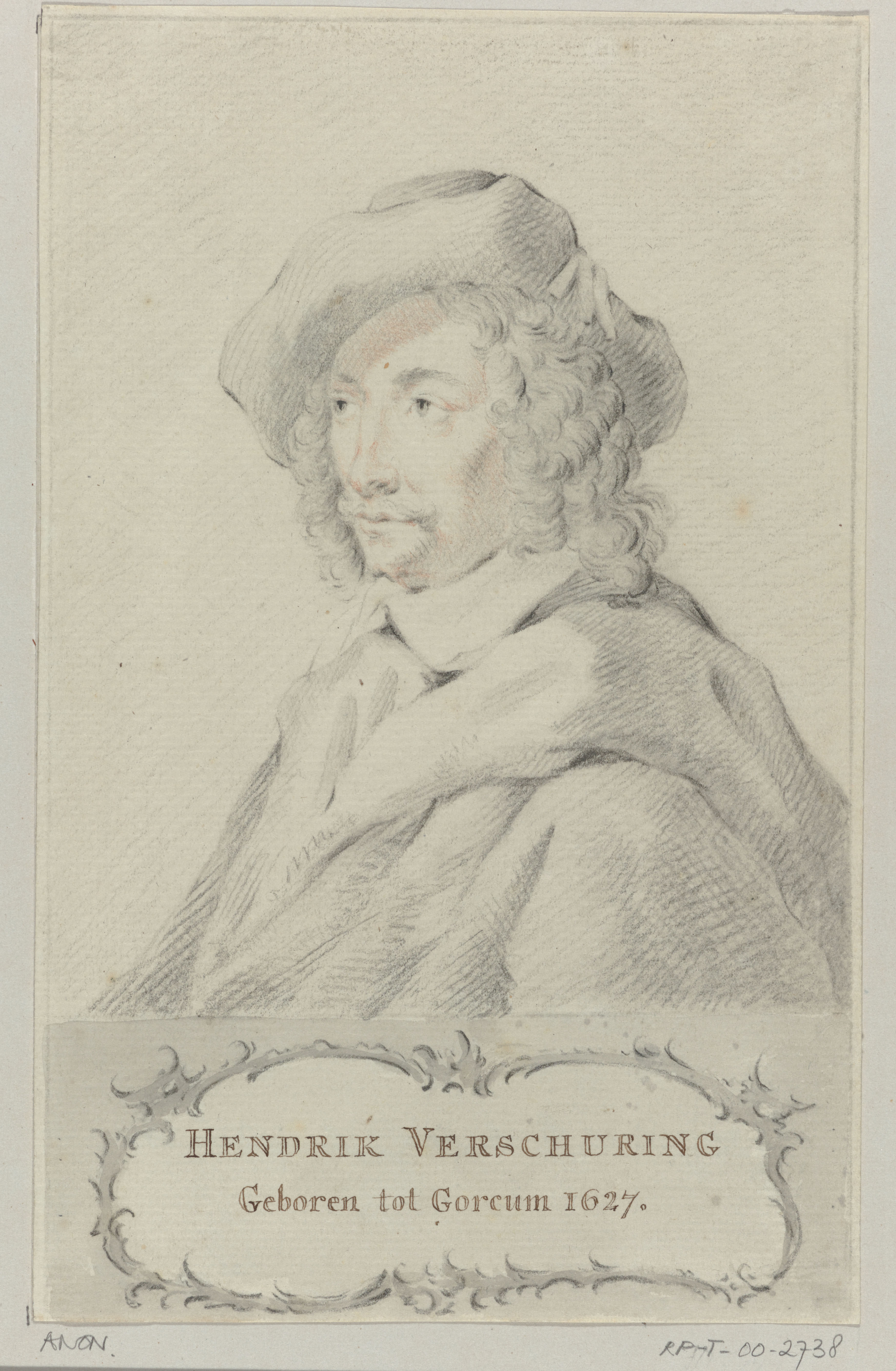
- Hendrick Verschuring - Dutch Golden Age Painter
- Born: November 2, 1627; Gorinchem, Netherlands
- Died: April 26, 1690; Dordrecht
- Education: North Netherlandish Dirck Govertsz, pupil of Jan Both
- Known for: Painting & Prints
- Notable work: The National Gallery London, The Louvre

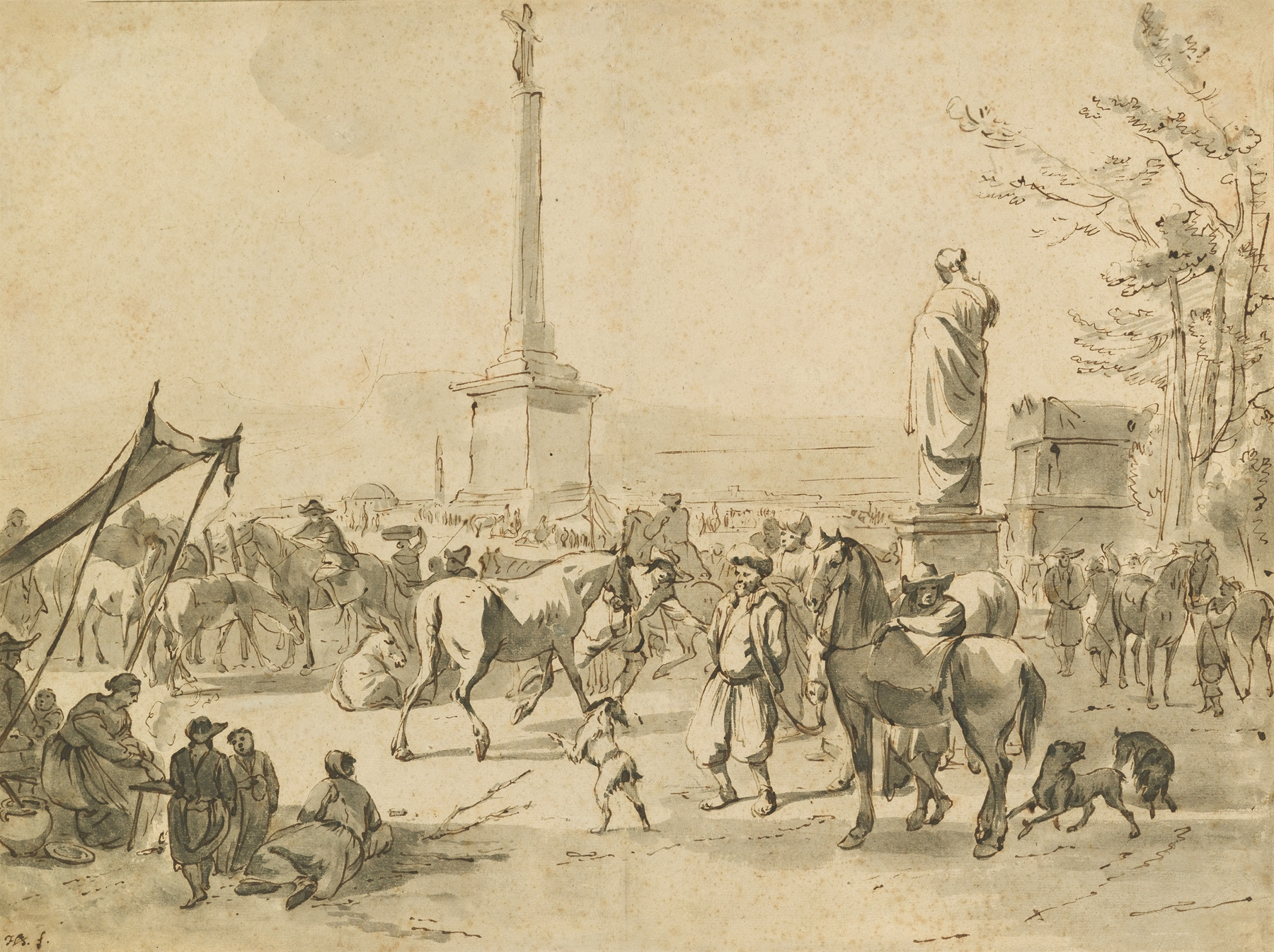
A Horse Market with Arabian Merchants in the Campo Vaccino, Rome.

Hendrik Verschuring (1627–1690) was a Dutch Golden Age landscape painter from Gorinchem who often decorated his landscapes with soldiers on horseback.

== Biography ==
His father was a hopman, which is a Dutch term for a flag bearer of a schutterij. When his son seemed to have more interest in art than in military matters, he was sent to learn drawing from a portrait painter, Dirck Govertsz, at the young age of eight. At thirteen he became the pupil of Jan Both where he stayed six years, until he left Utrecht for a trip to Rome. He made drawings of all the places he stayed, especially new buildings or items of interest. His work was in demand in Venice, so he stayed in Italy for ten years. On his return journey in Paris, he met Joan Huydecoper, the son of the Mayor (burgermeester) of Maarseveen, who was on his Grand Tour to Italy and who persuaded him to be his guide. He again spent three more years in Italy and returned finally to Gorinchem in 1662, where he continued to paint soldiers on horseback in natural landscapes.

According to the RKD he was the teacher of his son Willem Verschuring and Mattheus Wijtmans, and became a member of the Gorinchem city council in 1672. He was a pupil of Dirck Govertsz from the age of eight to thirteen. After that he was with Jan Both for six years (Houbraken 1719)

== Works ==
- Paintings by Verschuring in the Louvre
- Cavalry attacking a Fortified Place, 1677, National Gallery, London
- The Dogcart, Museum Bredius, The Hague
- The Forecourt: Figures and Horses by Town Gate, Mercer Art Gallery
- Fight for the flag, Dorotheum,
