= Zoeterwoude-Dorp =

- Town
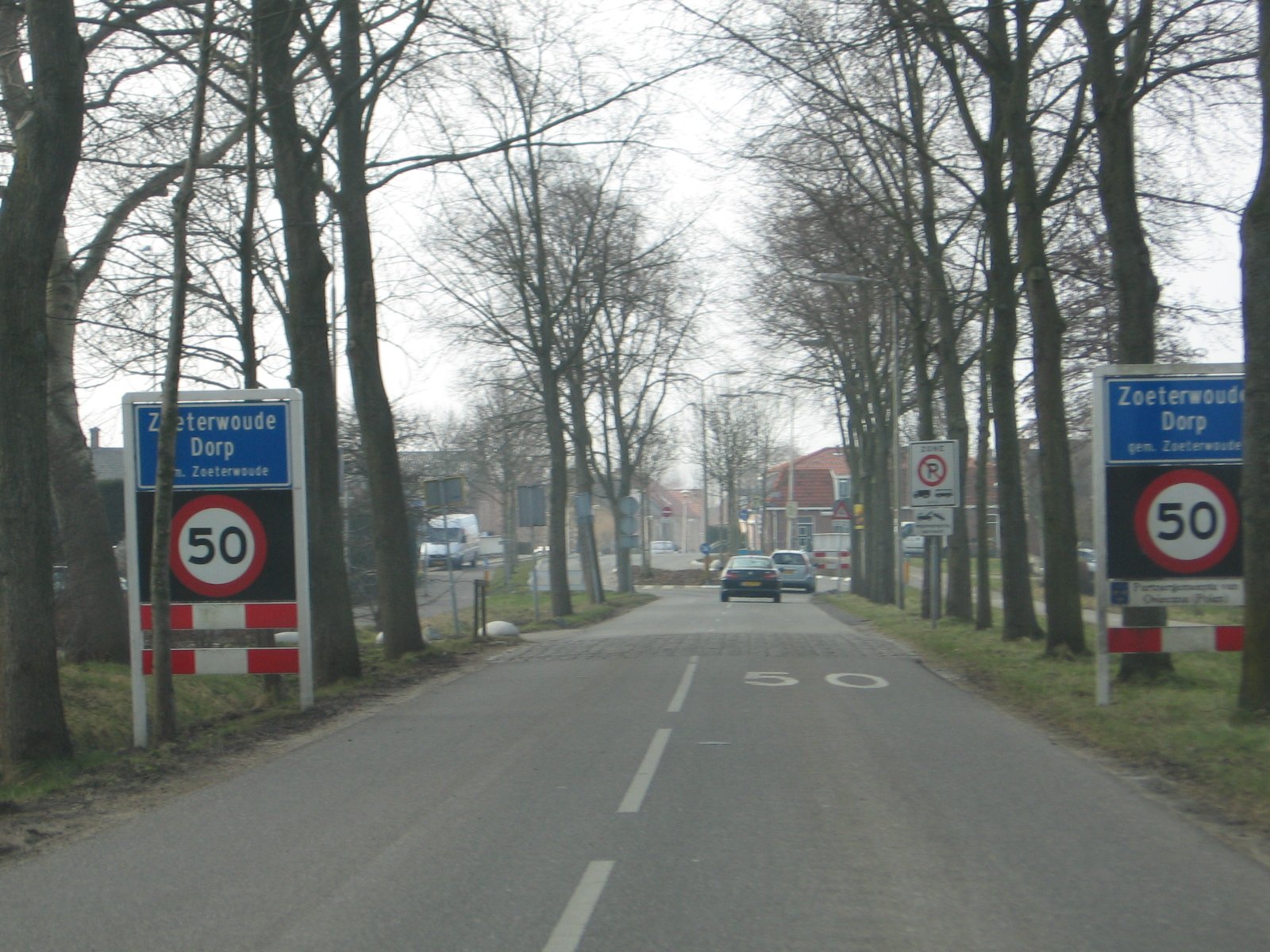
- Eastern entrance to Zoeterwoude-Dorp, from the Nieuwe Weg

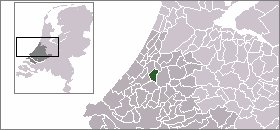

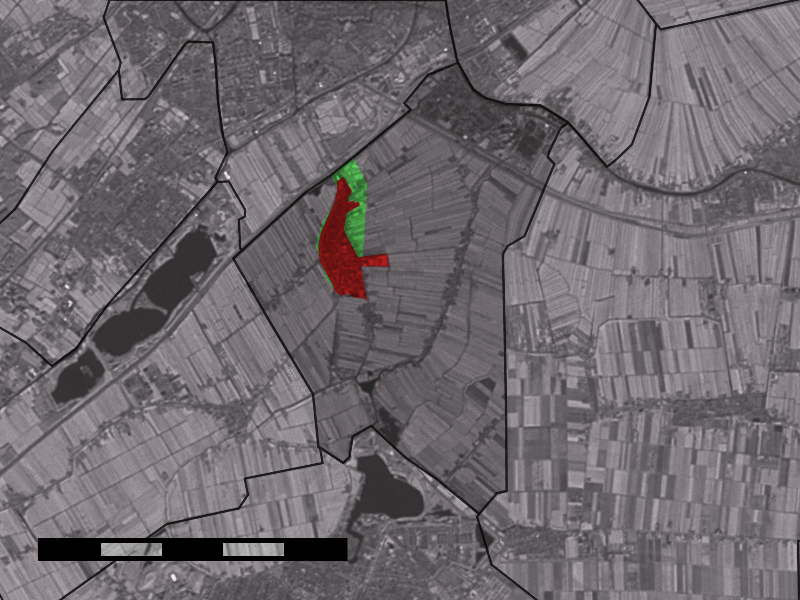
- The town centre (red) and the statistical district (light green) of Zoeterwoude-Dorp in the municipality of Zoeterwoude.
- Coordinates: 52°7′9″N 4°29′48″E
- Country: Netherlands
- Province: South Holland
- Municipality: Zoeterwoude

Area
  - Total: 119 ha (290 acres)
  - Water: 3 ha (7.4 acres)

Population (2015)
  - Total: 4,205
  - Density: 3,530/km^{2} (9,150/sq mi)
- Time zone: UTC+1 (CET)
  - Summer (DST): UTC+2 (CEST)
- Postal code: 2381
- Dialing code: 071 580

Zoeterwoude-Dorp is a town in the Dutch province of South Holland. It is a part of the municipality of Zoeterwoude, and lies about 3.5 km south of Leiden. It has its origins in the 13th century, and even though the whole town went up in flames in the late 16th century, it was rebuilt within a hundred years and significantly expanded over the course of the 20th century.

== History ==
Although signs of human settlement in the Zoeterwoude region were dated to as early as the 8th century in the vicinity of present-day Weipoort, a village on the current location of Zoeterwoude-Dorp was not constructed until about 1276 when the mire in the area was cultivated. A Catholic church from the earlier village dedicated to the English missionary Saint Lebuinus was rebuilt in what was then called "Zwieterwoude".

Over the course of the centuries, the village was constructed with this Lebuinus church as its center. In the 15th century, the northern part of town became known as "Noordbuurt" (English: Northern Neighbourhood).

In 1574, Zoeterwoude-Dorp was burnt down by the neighbouring town of Leiden. Leiden did this in order to protect itself against the Spanish in the Eighty Years' War, which had come to envelop the entire country. The town was rebuilt by 1650.

During the 19th century, the town saw some changes. The Dorpsstraat (English: Town Street) was outfitted with nine new houses in 1828, while in 1866 a cow bush (a burial place for cows that died of anthrax – a disease to which the town was no stranger) was removed. In 1870 the town hall was moved from a rental building at the Hoge Rijndijk (English: High Rijn Causeway) to a new building at its present location at the Noordbuurtseweg.

In the 20th century, the town was expanded significantly. After World War II, three new neighbourhoods named Westwout, Vogelweide and Bloemenweide were built on the west side of the town, giving the town its current function as the heart of the Zoeterwoude municipality, and a residential center.

Attempts to discover more information about the origins of the town were thwarted in October 1981, when an archaeological survey in the centre of the town failed to unveil anything of note.

== Demographics ==
In 2015, the town of Zoeterwoude-Dorp had 4205 inhabitants, which means that in the previous four years the population has shrunk by 280. In 2001, the built-up area of the town was calculated to be 0.87 km² and containing 1576 residences.

=== Politics ===
During the last general election, in 2012 voters in the three polling stations within Zoeterwoude-Dorp gave the VVD the highest share of the vote. With 31.7% in Huize Emmaus, 34.4% in the town hall and 31.4% in the Muziekcentrum (English: Musical centre), the VVD in Zoeterwoude-Dorp outperformed its national average of 26.6%. The PvdA came in second – underperforming its national average by 2.6–4.4% across the three polling stations – while CDA came in third overperforming their national average by 2.8–6%.

== Education ==
In the late 19th century, Zoeterwoude-Dorp had only one primary school. It was a municipal school located in the Dorpsstraat (English: Town street)., which survived until the 1960s when it was taken down. The school had become outdated, and too small for the current population. Nowadays, the town has three primary schools: Klaverweide (founded in 1979), Corbulo (founded in 1985), and Westwoud (founded in 1985).

In 2014, an investigation was opened to see if the three primary schools could merge into a 'broad school' in 2018, A plan was put forward and approved, allowing for a new building to be constructed at the Bennebroekweg in the centre of the town. When the merger is completed, Zoeterwoude-Dorp will have only one primary school left.

== Transportation ==
=== Road ===
In the west, Zoeterwoude-Dorp is connected to the A4 motorway through its seventh exit, which directly connects Zoeterwoude-Dorp to The Hague and Amsterdam, as well as its municipal neighbour Zoeterwoude-Rijndijk.

Along the western border, provincial motorway N206 connects Zoeterwoude-Dorp to Stompwijk in the south and Leiden in the north. The Molenpad (English: Windmill path) in the northeast allows pedestrians and cyclists to travel to Zoeterwoude-Rijndijk, while the town's southern exit at the Zuidbuurtseweg (English: Zuidbuurt road) leads to Zuidbuurt. The Nieuwe Weg (English: New road) in the southeast connects the town to Weipoort.

=== Bus ===
Two bus routes cross Zoeterwoude-Dorp. Bus route 400 (served by Arriva) has two stops along the western edge of the town, and takes the passenger either to Leiden in the north or Zoetermeer in the south.

Prior to 2015, the 400 was numbered 365 and made an hourly ride through to the town itself. When Ariva was planning to scrap the route in 2013 (which was inherited from Connexxion which served Zoeterwoude-Dorp previously with their now defunct route 32), inhabitants protested and Arriva eventually caved.

Bus route 176 is the one now making stops at various locations within the town itself.

== Popular culture ==
A street in the northern part of the town, Laan van Oud Raadwijk (English: Lane of Old Raadwijk), was used as a backdrop for the 1960s and 1970s Dutch television series Swiebertje.
