= Westeinde =

Westeinde (Dutch for "West end") is the name of a number of villages in the Netherlands:

- Westeinde, Drenthe
- Westeinde, North Holland
- Westeinde, Zoeterwoude, in the province of South Holland
