= Zoeterwoude =

- Municipality
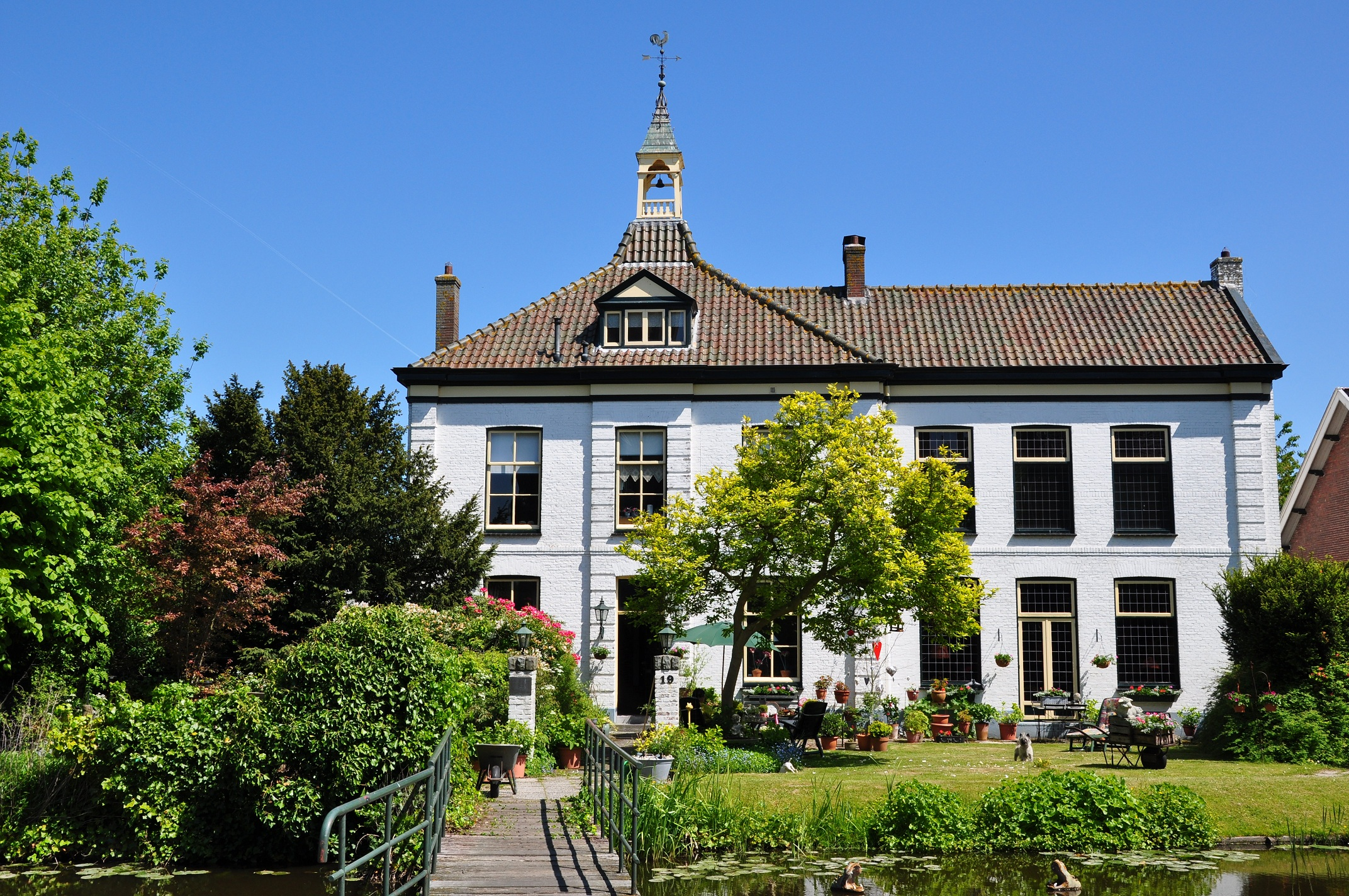
- Former monastery of the Franciscan Order from 1880, later a girls' school, in Zoeterwoude

- Flag Coat of arms

- Location in South Holland
- Coordinates: 52°8′N 4°30′E
- Country: Netherlands
- Province: South Holland

Government
  - Body: Municipal council
  - Mayor: Fred van Trigt (CDA)

Area
  - Total: 21.96 km^{2} (8.48 sq mi)
  - Land: 21.19 km^{2} (8.18 sq mi)
  - Water: 0.77 km^{2} (0.30 sq mi)
- Elevation: −2 m (−6.6 ft)

Population (January 2021)
  - Total: 8,843
  - Density: 417/km^{2} (1,080/sq mi)
- Time zone: UTC+1 (CET)
  - Summer (DST): UTC+2 (CEST)
- Postcode: 2380–2382
- Area code: 071
- Website: zoeterwoude.nl

Zoeterwoude (Dutch pronunciation: [ˌzutərˈʋʌudə]) is a municipality in the province of South Holland, Western Netherlands. It covers 21.96 km^{2} (8.48 sq mi) of which 0.77 km^{2} (0.30 sq mi) is water. It had a population of 8,843 in 2021.

Located to the southeast of Leiden and north of Zoetermeer, the municipality of Zoeterwoude consists of Gelderswoude, Weipoort, Westeinde, Zoeterwoude-Dorp, Zoeterwoude-Rijndijk and Zuidbuurt.

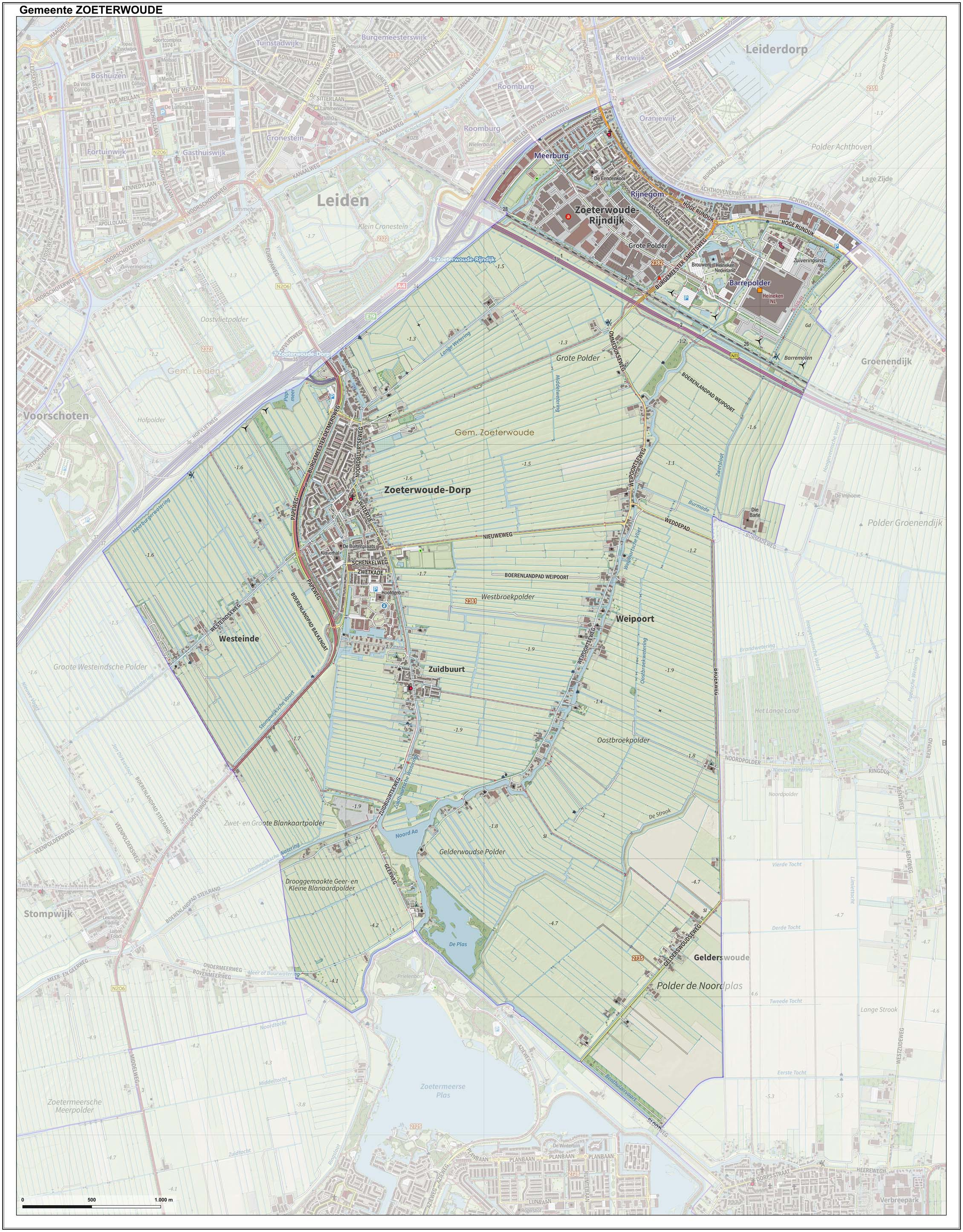
Topographic map of Zoeterwoude, Sept. 2014

== History ==
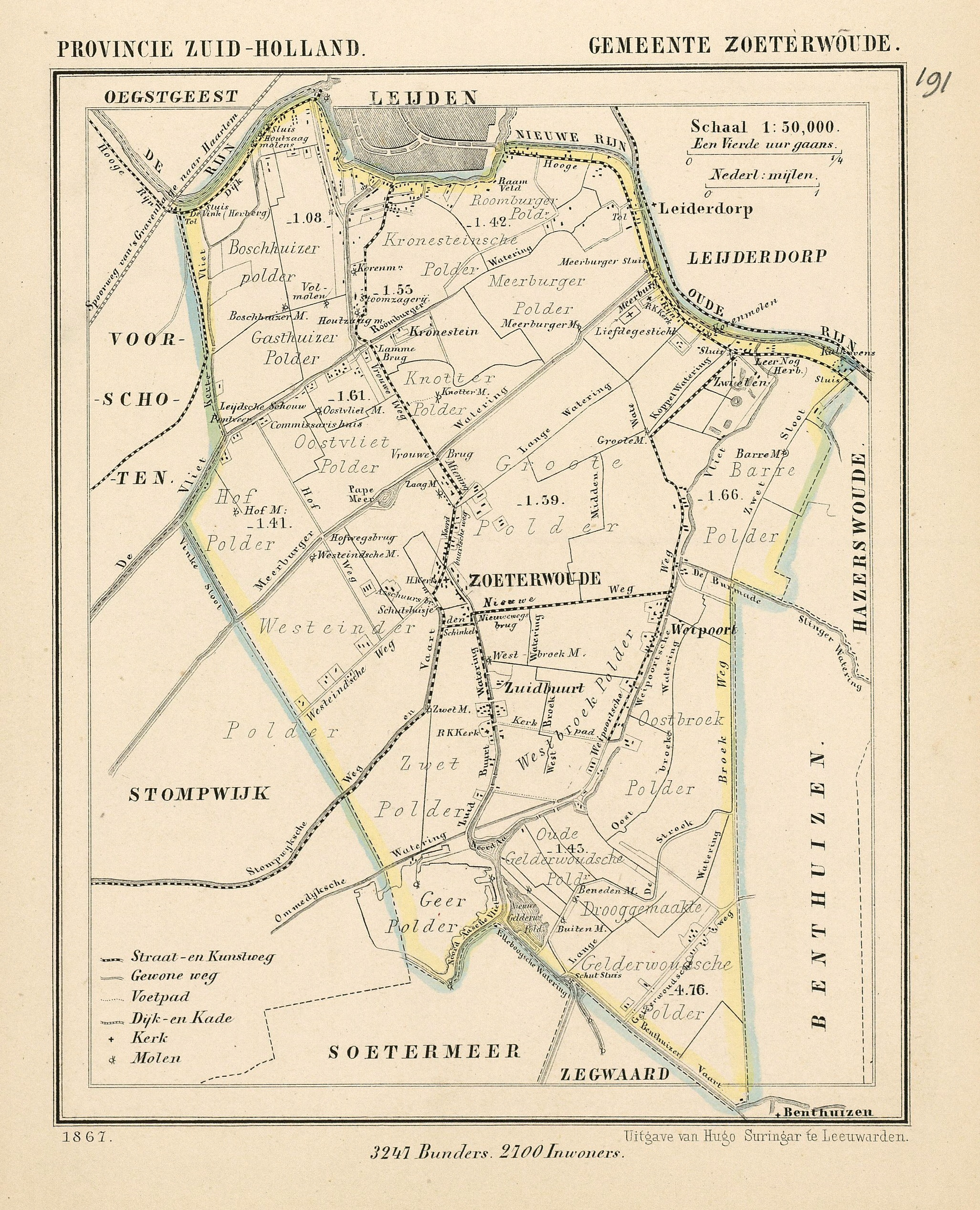
1867 map of Zoeterwoude

The name Zoeterwoude is first mentioned in a document from 1205, which references a certain "Florentius van Sotrewold". It is uncertain if this is a reference to the village. The first confirmed existence is from 1276 when Dirk van Santhorst received the "Soetrewold" fiefdom from Floris V, Count of Holland.

Its municipal boundaries were set circa 1300. At that time it was one of the largest municipalities in the Netherlands, but later much land was annexed by surrounding cities, notably Leiden. In 1450, the first bridge between Leiderdorp and Zoeterwoude was built. In 1574, Zoeterwoude was burnt to the ground and its polders inundated by Leideners in order to increase the range of the city's cannons. Almost no inhabitants remained in Zoeterwoude.

Around 1650, Zoeterwoude had been almost rebuilt and 50 years later it was prospering. After 1800, Leiden started a long series of annexations, reducing the land area of Zoeterwoude.

In 1960, the A4 motorway was built and since 1966 it has been the municipal boundary between Leiden and Zoeterwoude.

== Economy ==
A datacenter from SWIFT is located in Zoeterwoude.

The main brewery of Heineken International is located in Zoeterwoude.

== Notable people ==
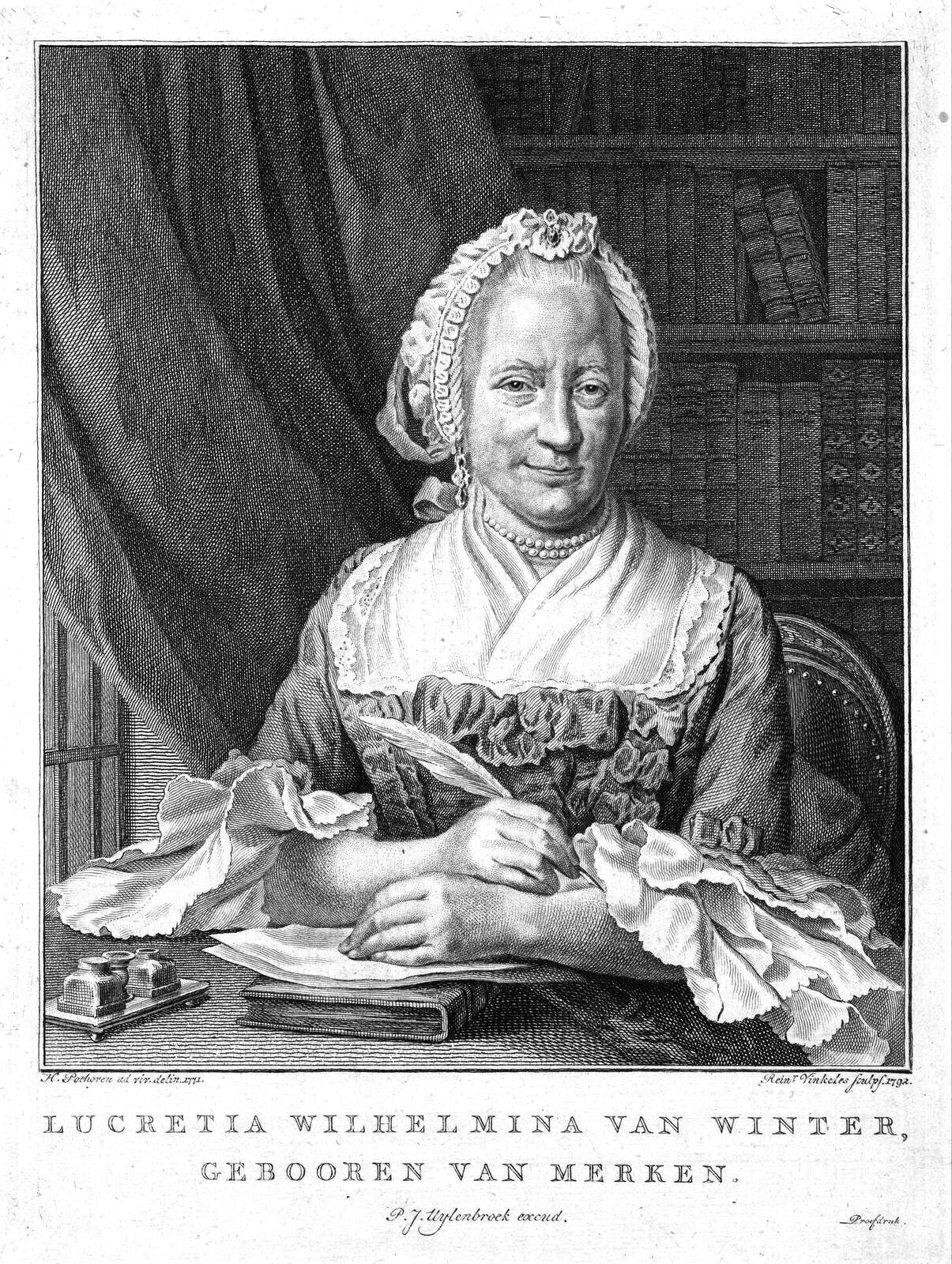
Lucretia Wilhelmina van Merken, 1771 portrait

- Lucretia Wilhelmina van Merken (1721–1789), dramatist and poet
- Harm Kamerlingh Onnes (1893–1985), portrait painter and ceramist
- Paul van Kempen (1893–1955), violinist and conductor
- Bram van Velde (1895–1981), fine-art painter
- Aar de Goede (1928–2016), politician

=== Sport ===
- François Brandt (1874–1949), rower, competed at the 1900 Summer Olympics
- Jeroen Straathof (born 1972), cyclist and speed skater
- Suzanne de Goede (born 1984), cyclist

== Gallery ==
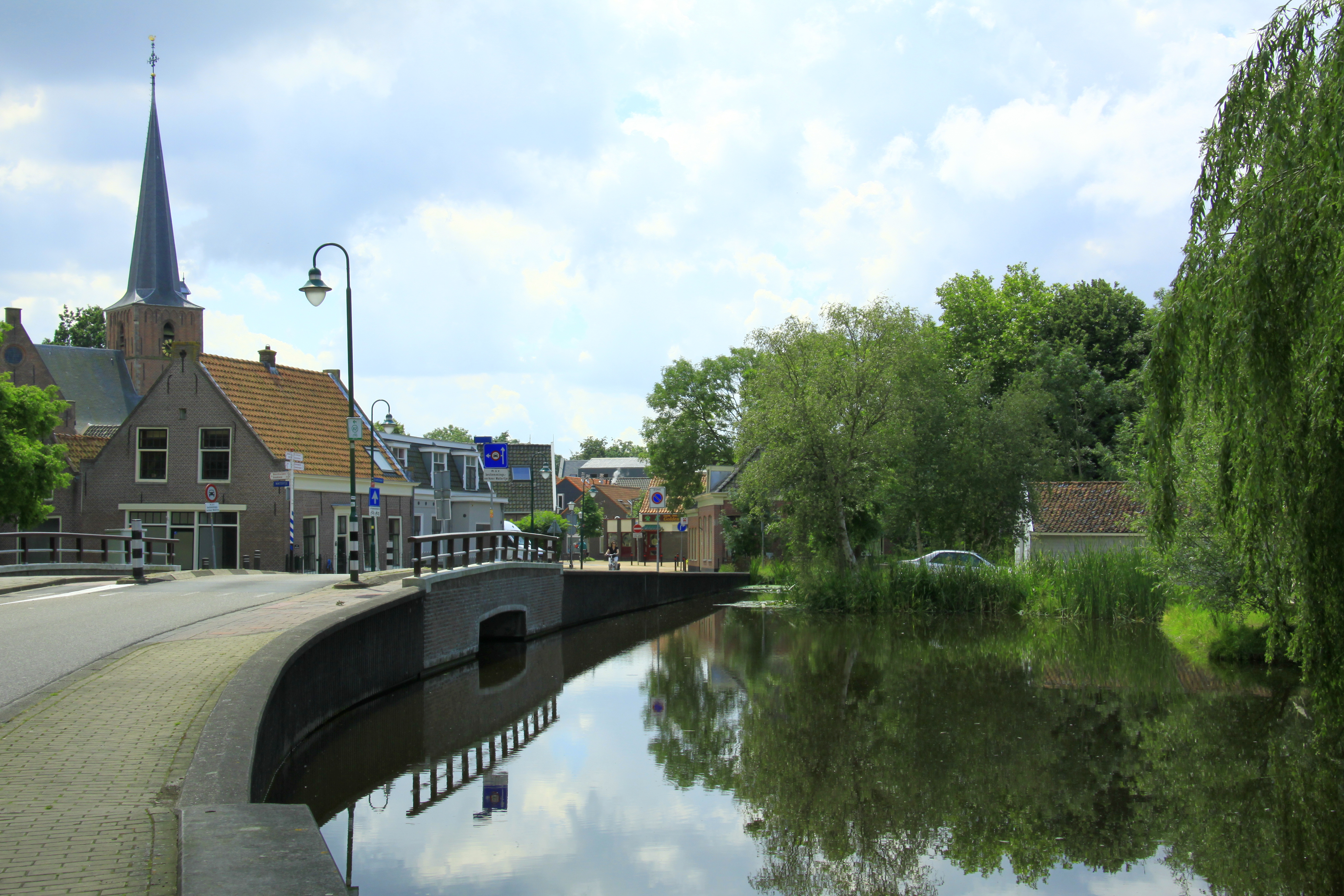
Zoeterwoude. Village view, as seen from the Watertje

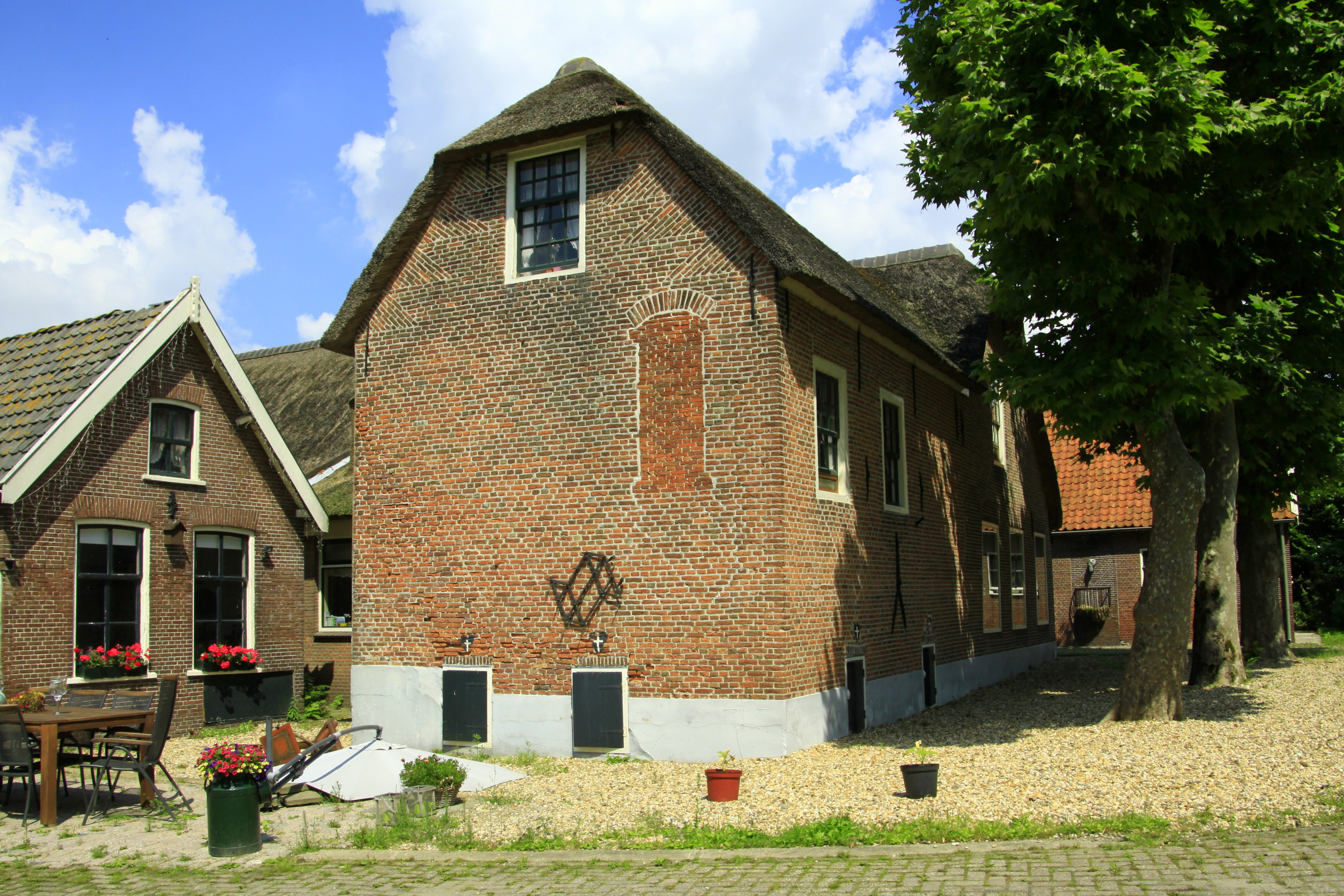
Weipoort, a stretched out neighbourhood within Zoeterwoude

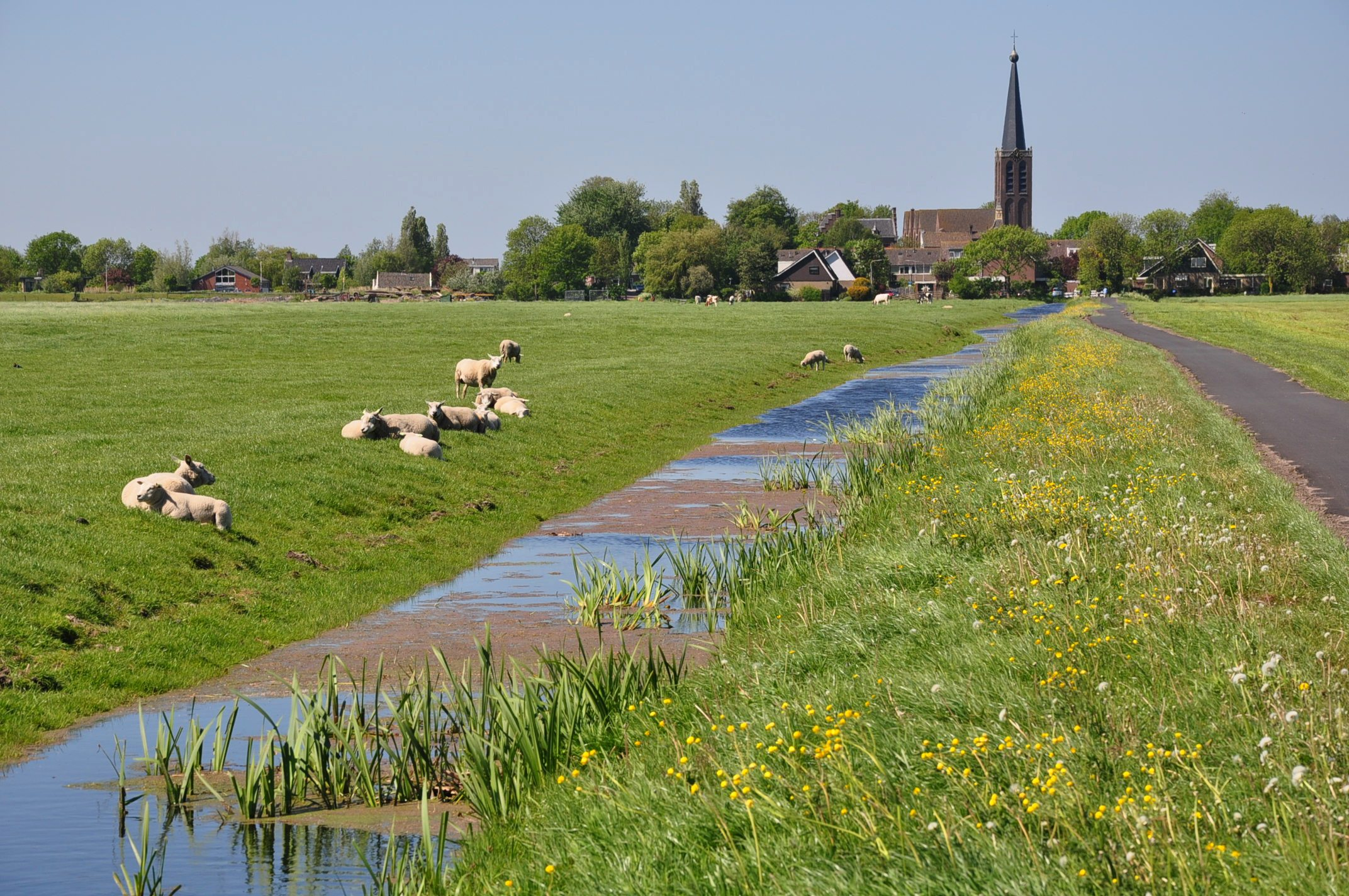
View over the Westbroekpolder near Zoeterwoude-Zuidbuurt

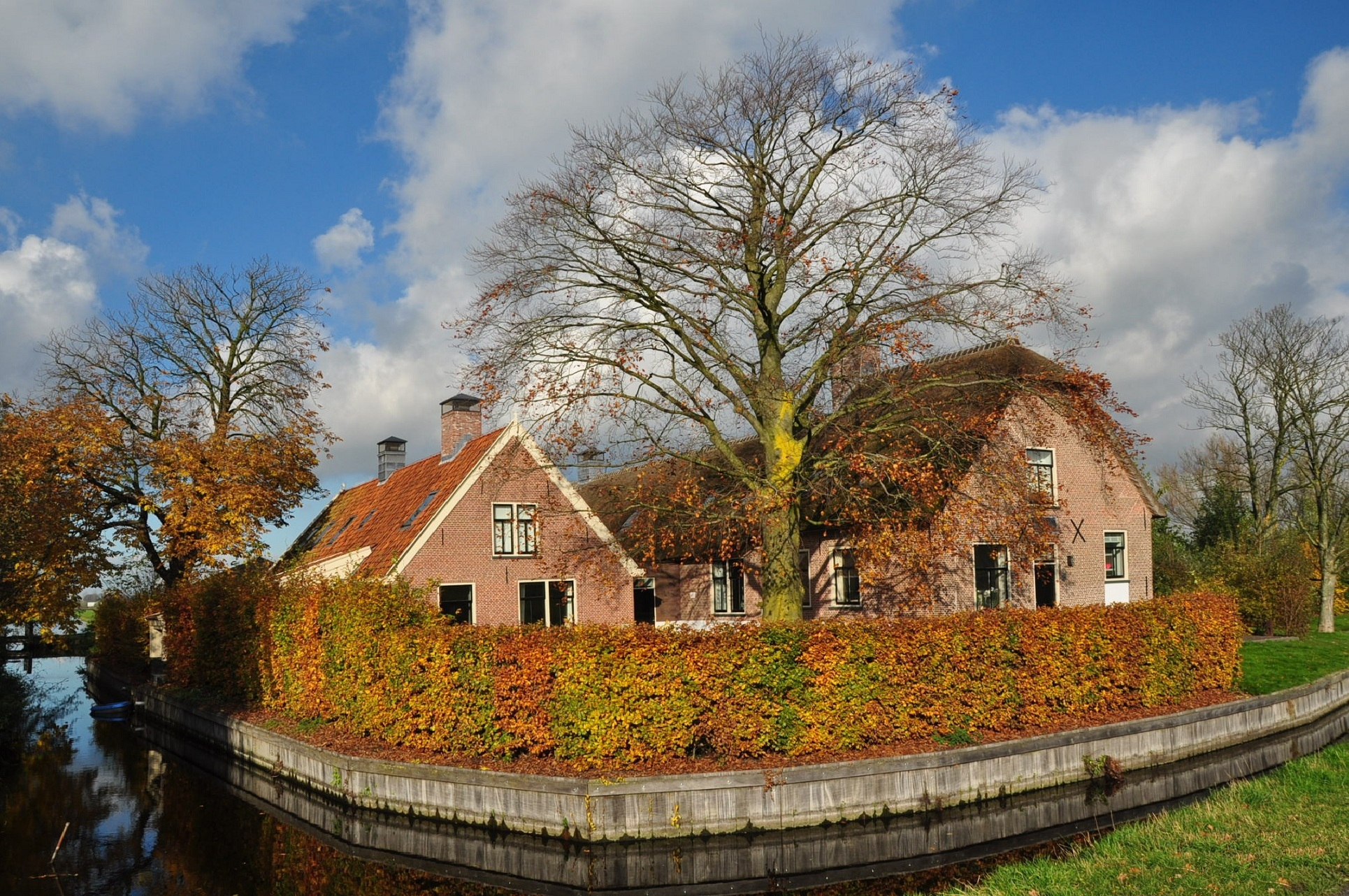
Christina's farm in Westeinde

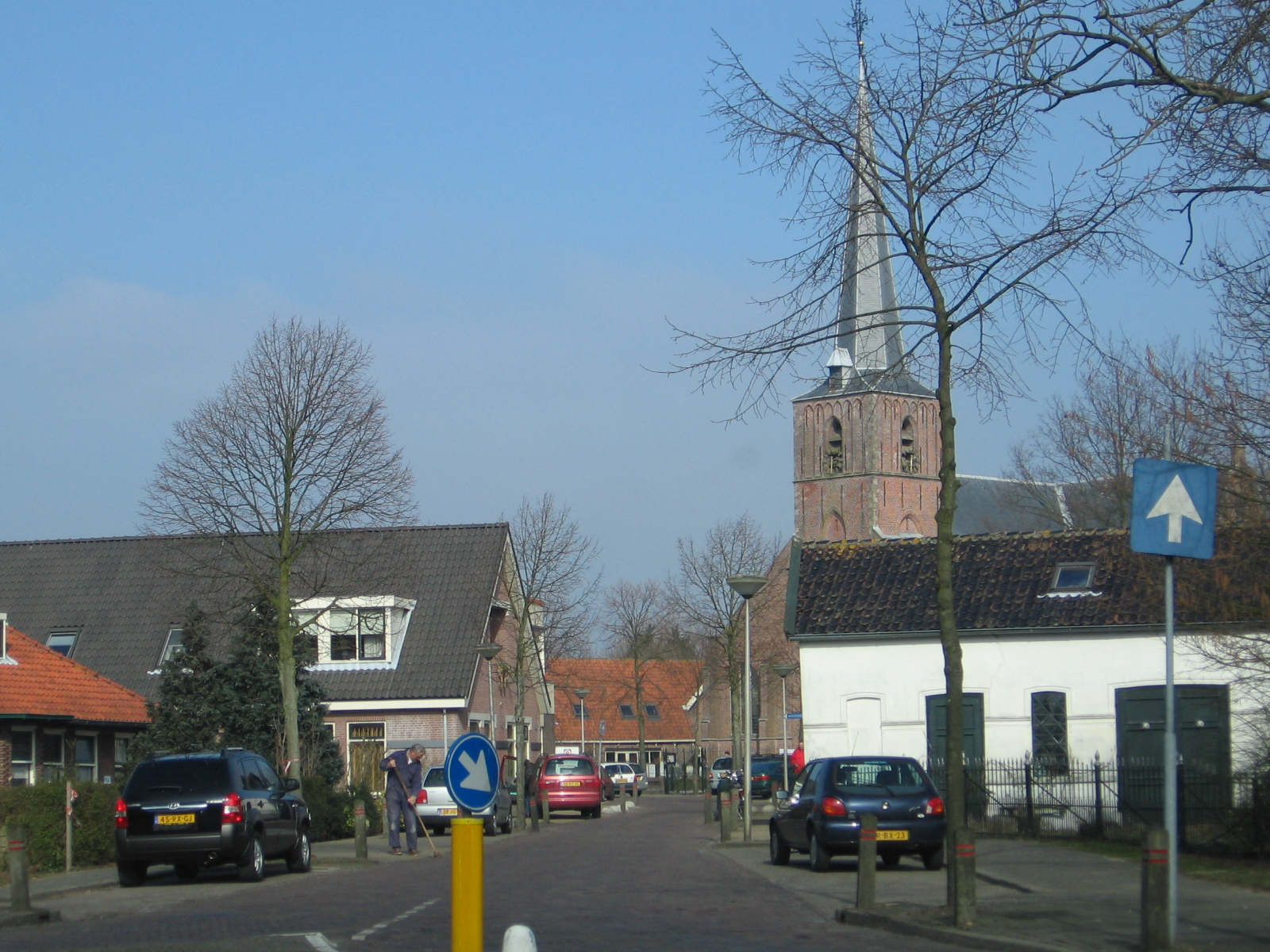
Skyline of Zoeterwoude

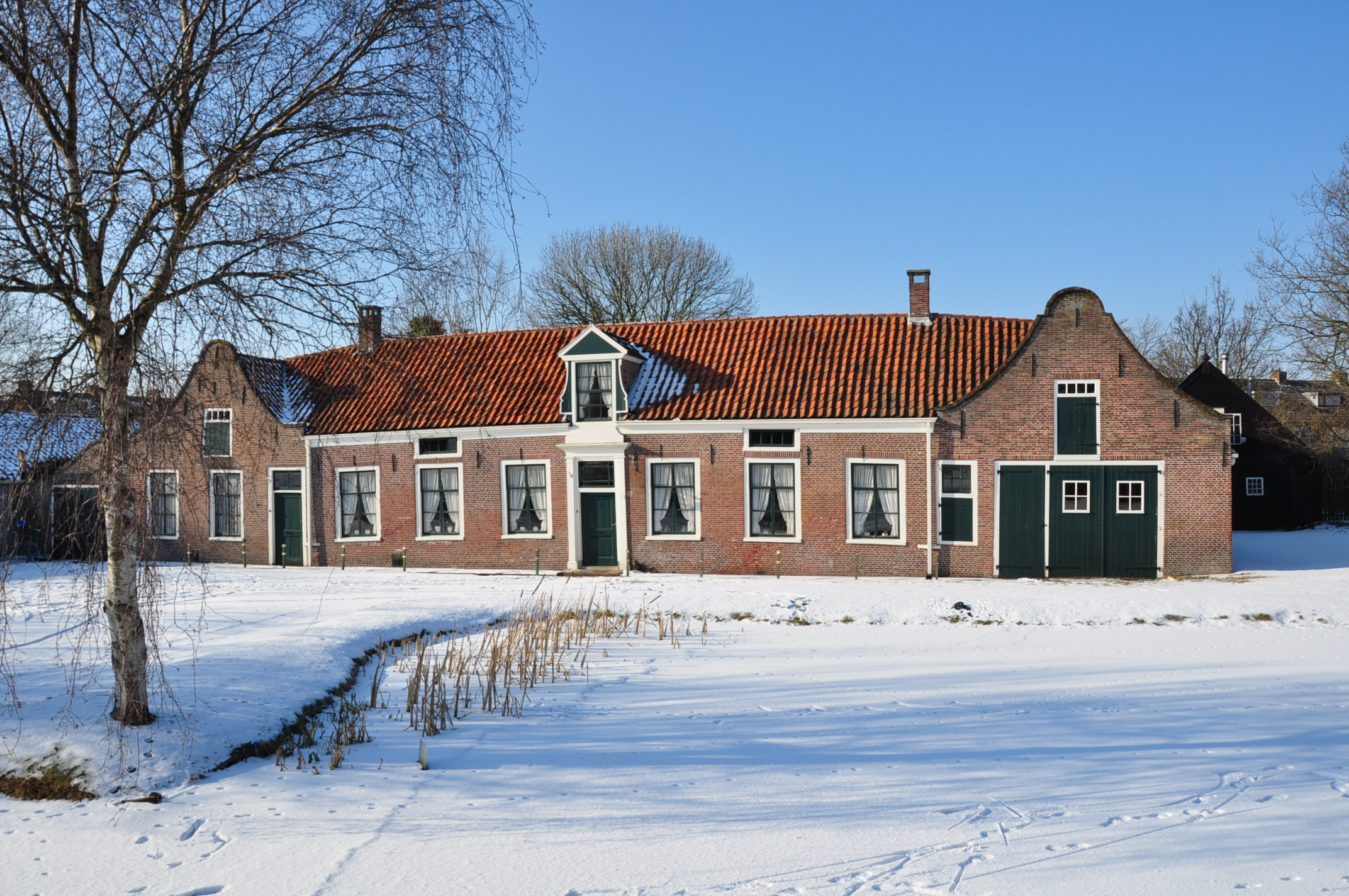
Former shipyard in the old centre

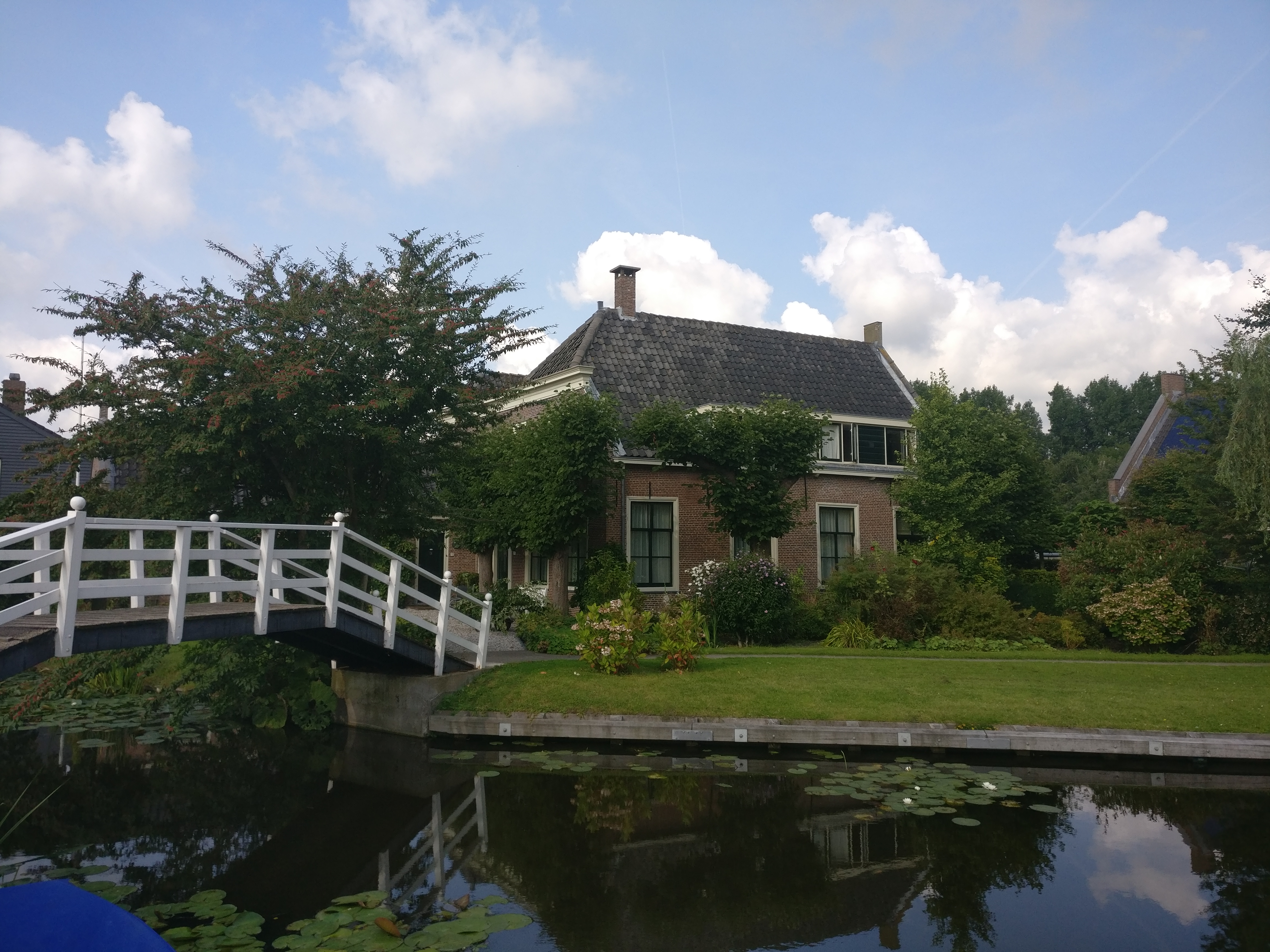
Noordbuurtseweg, Zoeterwoude
