= Gelderswoude =

- Village
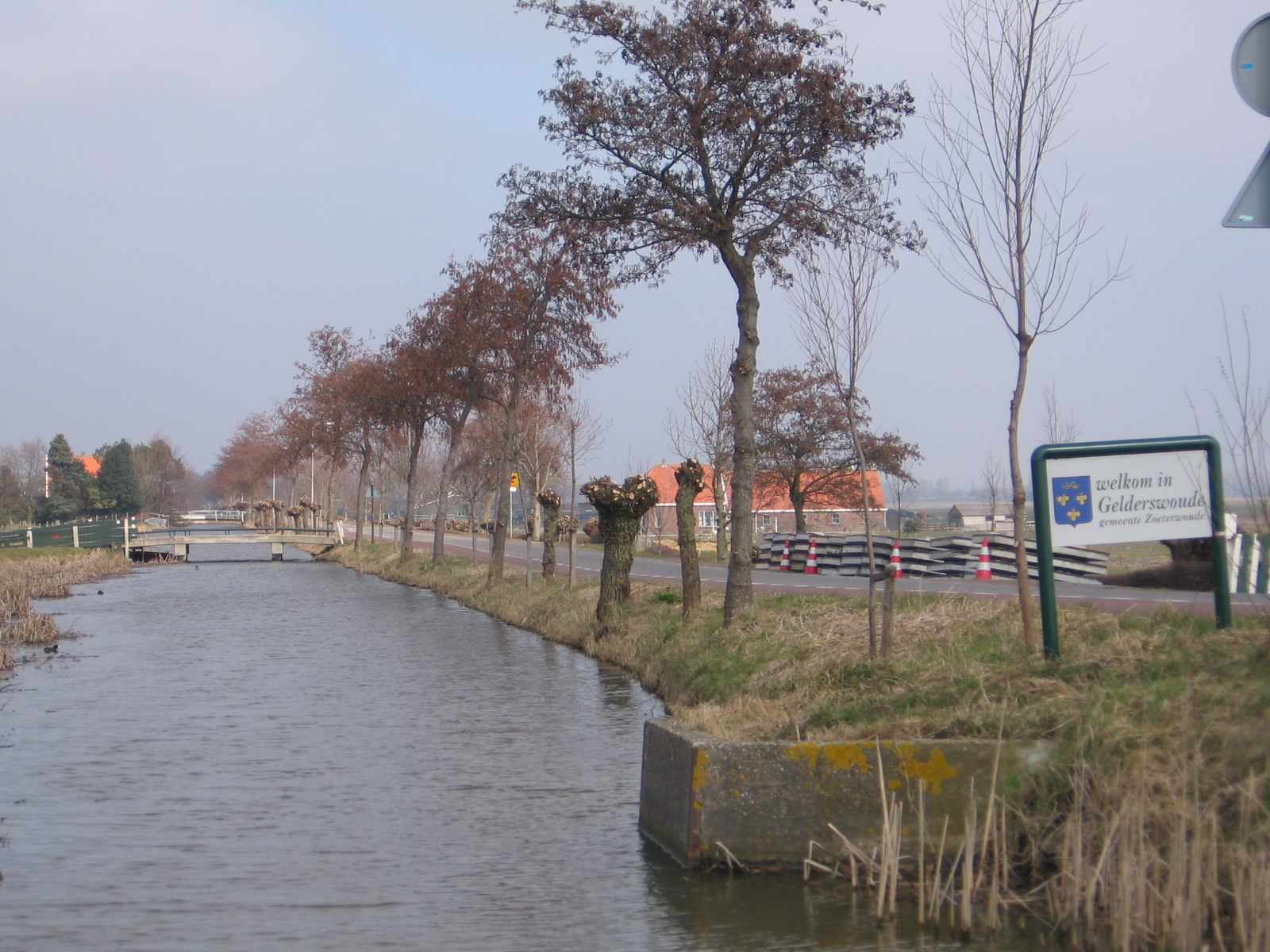

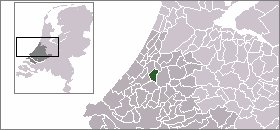

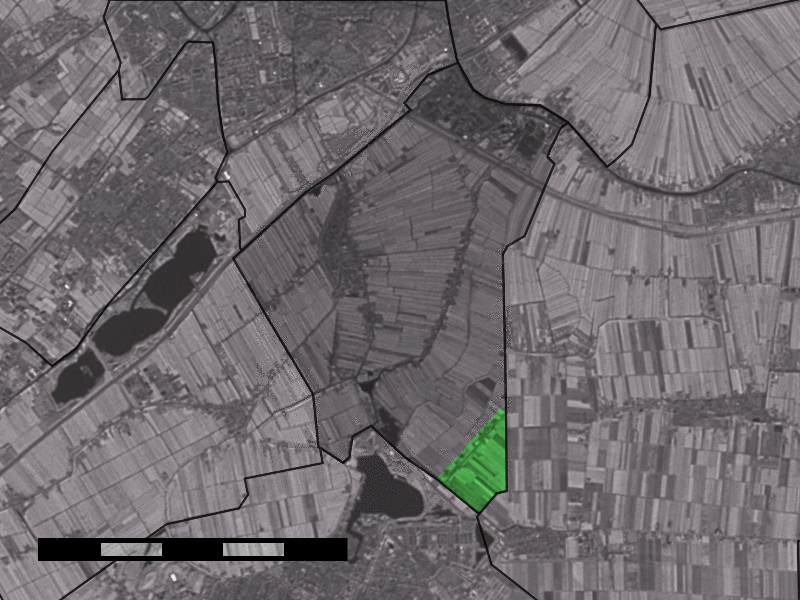
- Gelderswoude in the municipality of Zoeterwoude.
- Coordinates: 52°5′36″N 4°31′53″E
- Country: Netherlands
- Province: South Holland
- Municipality: Zoeterwoude

Area
  - Total: 1.04 km^{2} (0.40 sq mi)

Population
  - Total: 90
  - Density: 87/km^{2} (220/sq mi)
- Time zone: UTC+1 (CET)
  - Summer (DST): UTC+2 (CEST)

Gelderswoude is a village in the Dutch province of South Holland. It is a part of the municipality of Zoeterwoude, and lies about 5 km northeast of Zoetermeer.

The statistical area "Gelderswoude", which also can include the surrounding countryside, has a population of around 90.
