= Lucretia Wilhelmina van Merken =

Dutch author

Lucretia van Merken
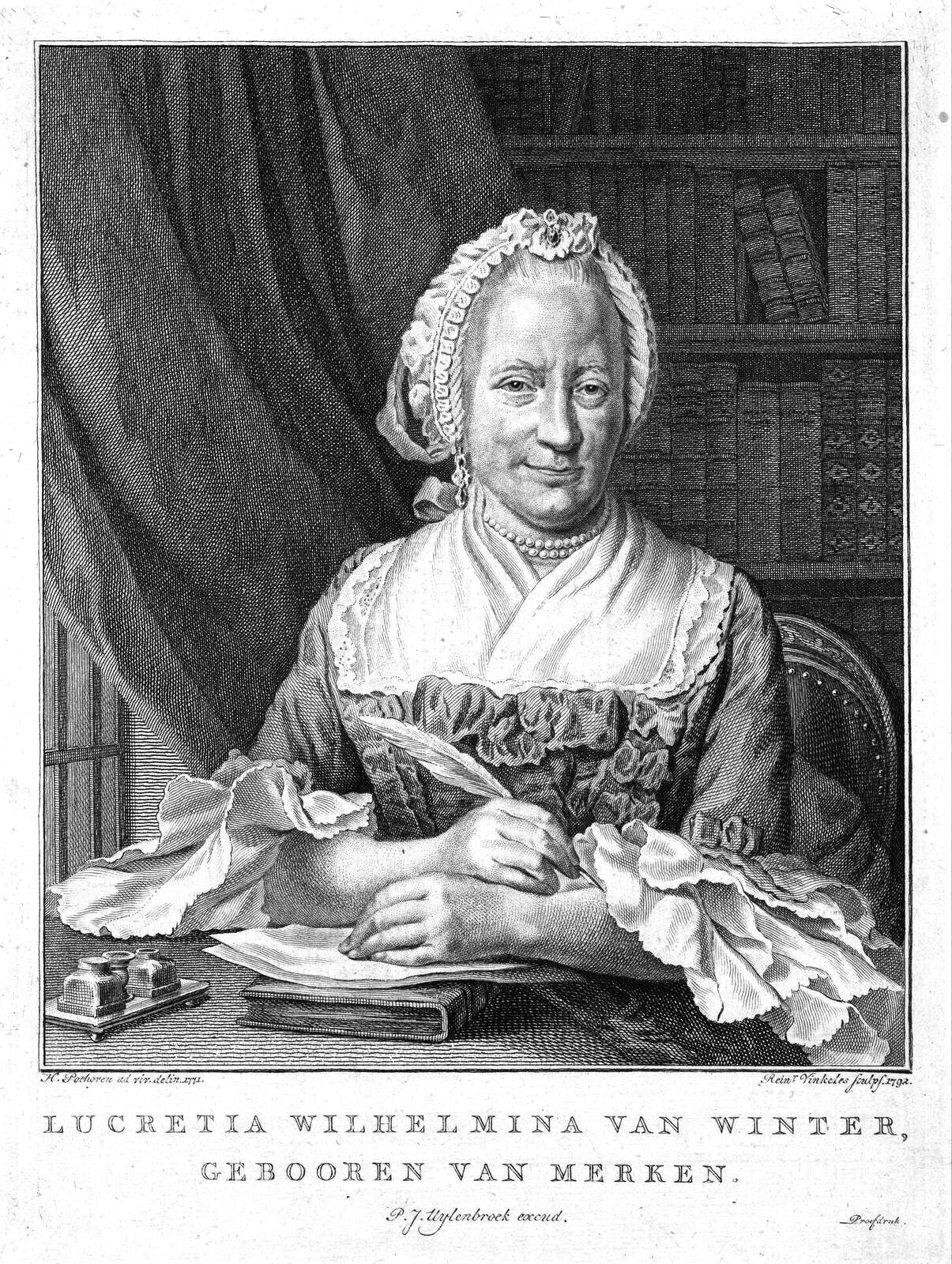
- Born: 21 August 1721; Amsterdam, Holland, Dutch Republic
- Died: 19 October 1789 (aged 68); Leiden, Holland, Dutch Republic
- Occupation: Writer
- Writing career
- Period: 1745–1789
- Genres: Poetry, tragedy
- Notable works: Artemines (1745); Het nut der tegenspoeden (1762); David (1768); Beleg der stad Leyden (1774); Jacob Simonszoon de Ryk (1774); Toneelpoezij (1774–1786); Germanicus (1779); De ware geluksbedeeling (1792)
- Website: dbnl.org

Lucretia Wilhelmina van Merken (Amsterdam, 21 August 1721 – Leiden, 19 October 1789) was a Dutch poet and playwright. She began writing occasional poetry and had her first tragedy published in her early twenties. Influenced by the Enlightenment, her tragedies were classicist in style and proved to be popular, being performed all over the country. She wrote an ode in French for George Washington, and sent it to him, and for the revised Dutch version of the Book of Psalms she provided seventeen of the psalms.

== Biography ==
Lucretia van Merken was born to fur trader Jacob van Merken (1691–1754) and Susanna Wilhelmina Brandt (1687–1759), a granddaughter of historian and poet Gerard Brandt (1626–1685). She grew up in Amsterdam on the corner of Keizersgracht and Herenstraat, in a family of Remonstrants. From a young age she was interested in poetry, supported by her mother and by poet Frans de Haes, an older cousin. Her literary examples were Sybrand Feitema and especially Joost van den Vondel.

In the 1750s van Merken lost her entire family: her father (1754), her mother (1759), and her younger sister Wilhelmina (1760). Her own health was also frail, and in the 1760s she was preparing for death.

Van Merken married on 26 September 1768 in Amsterdam, to Nicolaas Simon van Winter (1718–1795), a poet and paint merchant. Van Winter was a widower; his first wife, Johanna Mühl (1718–1768), had been a friend of van Merken's. The couple never had children. Van Winter proposed marriage in verse, and van Merken responded in kind. Shortly after the marriage, van Winter handed over his paint trade to his only son Pieter, and the couple moved to Leiden, maintaining their friendships in Amsterdam via intense correspondence. They spent summers on their estate near Bijdorp, near Zoeterwoude, where they entertained their friends.

In 1774, van Merken and her husband were named honorary citizens of Leiden, likely influenced by her tragedy Het beleg der stad Leyden (1774), which commemorates the Siege of Leiden. By that time her reputation as a poet was already established; Betje Wolff called her "the greatest poetess of our country". She died in Leiden, but was buried in the Oude Kerk, Amsterdam, where her husband was later buried as well. A plaque for the couple was placed in the Oude Kerk in 1828 by a Leiden society, to the right of the organ. A monument designed by another Leiden group was designed, but never built.

Van Merken represented the 18th-century Enlightenment ideal of an educated, civilized citizen, and for a long time was a model for budding poets. Romanticism ended the popularity of her work, and later attempts by Hendrik Tollens (1852) and Willem Kloos (1909) to reappraise her were unsuccessful.

== Literary works ==
In her younger years, van Merken mostly wrote occasional poetry, for instance for David van Mollem, owner of the Zijdebalen estate, and for Gerard Aarnout Hasselaar, mayor of Amsterdam. She wrote her first major work in her early twenties; her tragedy Artemines was published in 1745 by Izaak Duim in Amsterdam. In a period of grief she wrote about the comfort she derived from her faith in her didactic poem Het nut der tegenspoeden ("The use of adversities", 1762), a poem that was popular for a long time.

When a group of poets joined around 1760 to form a society, "Laus Deo, Salus Populo" ('Honor to God, blessings for the people'), in order to update the archaic rhymed translation of the Psalms by Petrus Datheen, van Merken's future husband was one of them. She joined the group, and when in 1773 the official new version of the Psalms were published, 17 of those were hers, including Psalm 42.

After moving to Leiden, van Winter and van Merken jointly published their plays in two volumes, Tooneelpoëzij (1774, 1786).

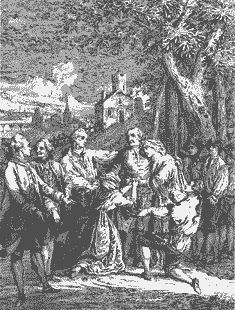
Frontispiece for De Camisards. Published in Tooneelpoëzij.

Her classicist tragedies were regularly performed in all the major Dutch cities; on 14 September 1774 the new Stadsschouwburg in Amsterdam was opened with the premiere of her tragedy Jacob Simonszoon de Ryk.

Because van Merken rarely commented on contemporary events outside of her occasional poems, her ode in French to George Washington, which she sent to him personally in October 1783, is all the more remarkable. The ode, which hails Washington as the defender of his people's freedom (apparently Van Merken despised the British), contained twenty four-line stanzas. Van Merken waited in vain for an answer, and half a year later, in April 1784, she sent it again, this time accompanied by a letter in French written by her husband. Washington knew little or no French, so he would have had to read both the letter and poem in translated form; two years later a letter from Gilbert du Motier, Marquis de Lafayette arrived, with two accompanying letters in English from Washington thanking the couple for the gift.

Van Merken's predilection for serious subject matter and lofty genre writing is evidenced by her tragedies, but also by two expansive epics: David (in twelve books, 1767) and Germanicus (in sixteen books, 1779). Her final work, De ware geluksbedeeling, published in 1792 along with some letters in rhyme and a few occasional poems, is similar to Het nut der tegenspoeden, a contemplation on life, on the inevitability of sorrow, and the comfort offered by religion.
