= Koepoort =

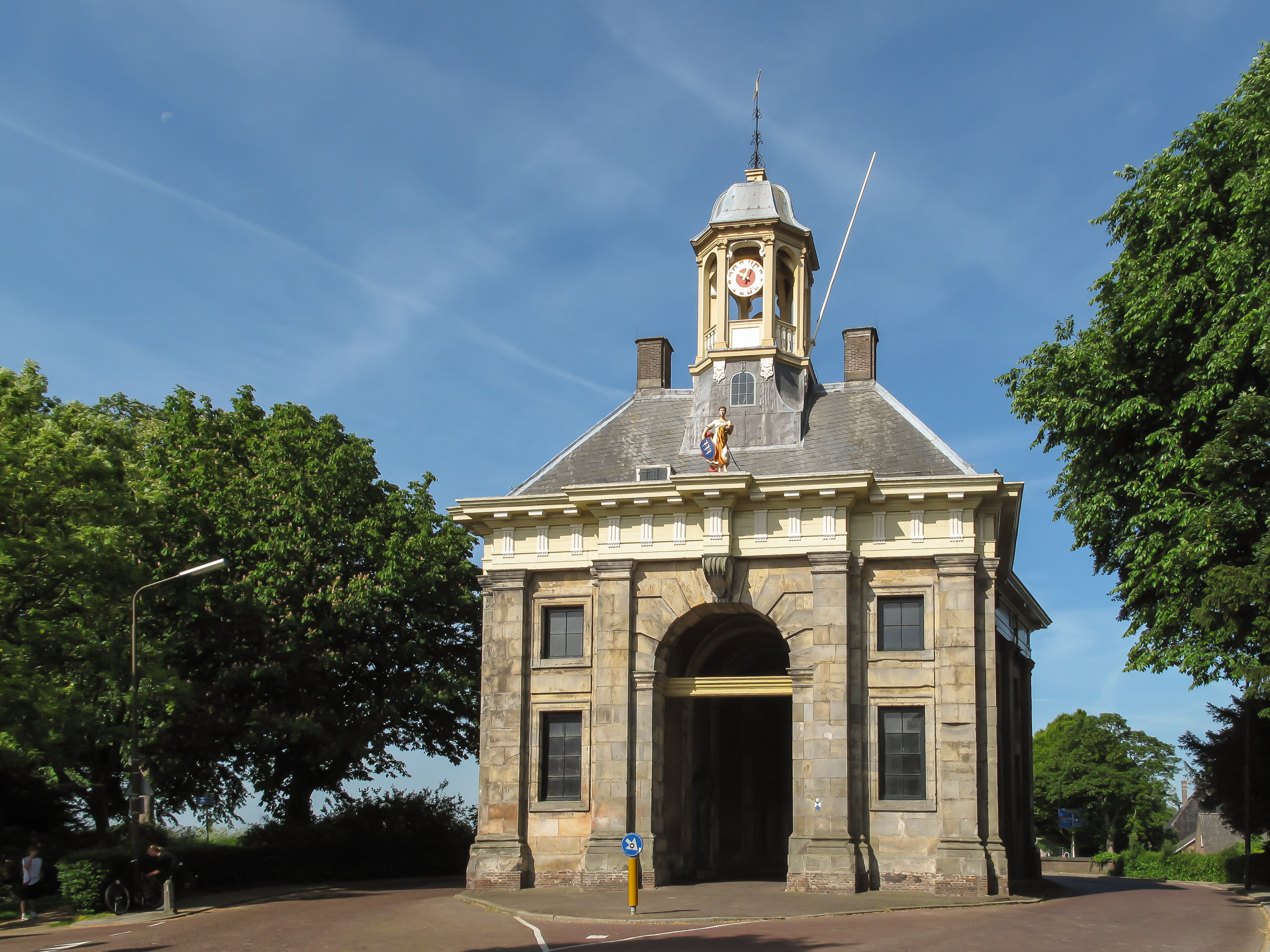
- Koepoort, viewed from the eastern (city) side
- Interactive map of the Koepoort area
- Alternative names: Westerpoort

General information
- Type: City gate
- Architectural style: Dutch Baroque
- Location: Vest 6, Enkhuizen, Netherlands
- Coordinates: 52°42′6″N 5°16′37″E
- Completed: 1649
- Inaugurated: 1654

The Koepoort or Westerpoort is a city gate in Enkhuizen. The gate used to be the main western entrance of Enkhuizen and is a part of the old fortifications of the city.

== Description ==
Between 1590 and 1593 Enkhuizen was extended toward the west. A new city wall was built with a moat and seven bastions. At the Koepoort's current location, a wooden gate and a drawbridge were built. Half a century later plans were made for a stone gate building. The Koepoort's architect is probably Jacob van Campen. In 1649 the foundation stone was installed, but it soon turned out that there was no sufficient supply of the Bentheimer sandstone that was used in the design. The gate was finished provisionally in 1654. Traffic was guided through the gate. Because of a paved road towards Hoorn that was made in 1672, a big chunk of all the city's traffic came in through the gate. The Koepoort soon began to decay because of lacking maintenance. In 1730 the gate was restored and a cupola was added. In 1793 a clockwork was placed inside the cupola.

Since 1930, the traffic is guided around the gate. The main street of Enkhuizen, the Westerstraat, ends at the Koepoort and continues as Westeinde. In 1987 a statue of the so called "Stedemaagd" was placed at the city side of the gate. The statue was made by Han Sterk.

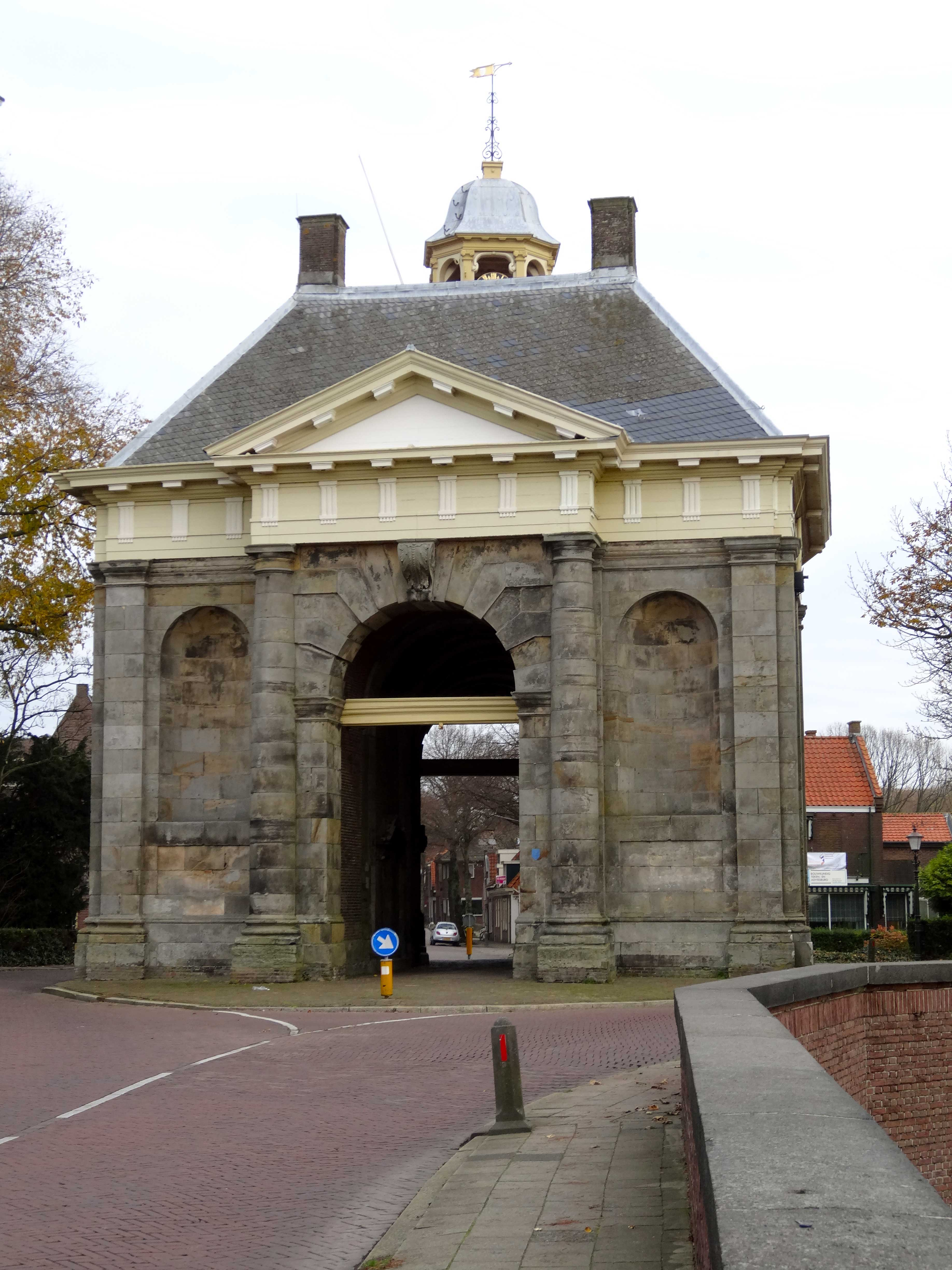
Koepoort seen from the western side (Westeinde side)

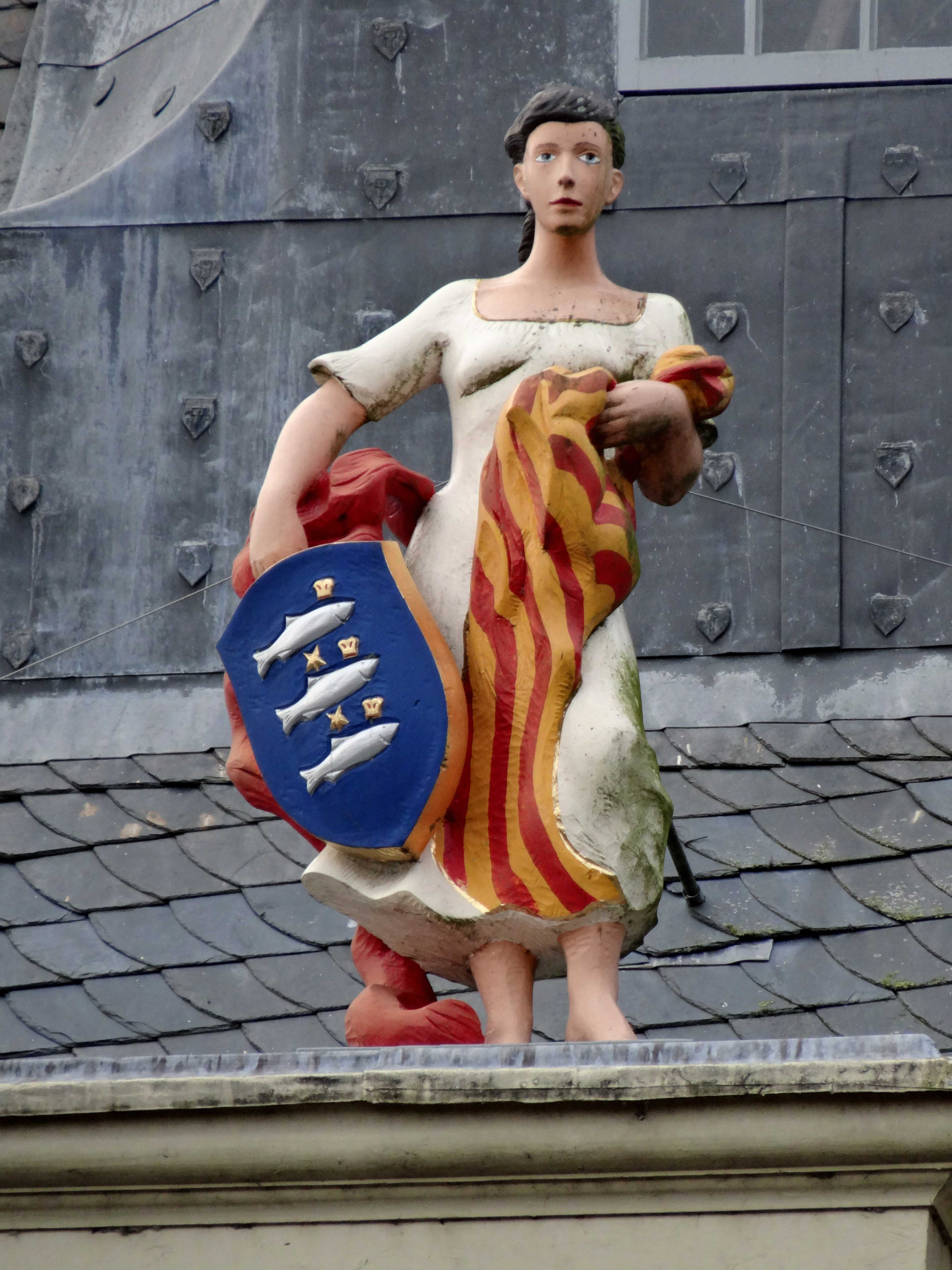
The "Stedemaagd" statue on the Koepoort

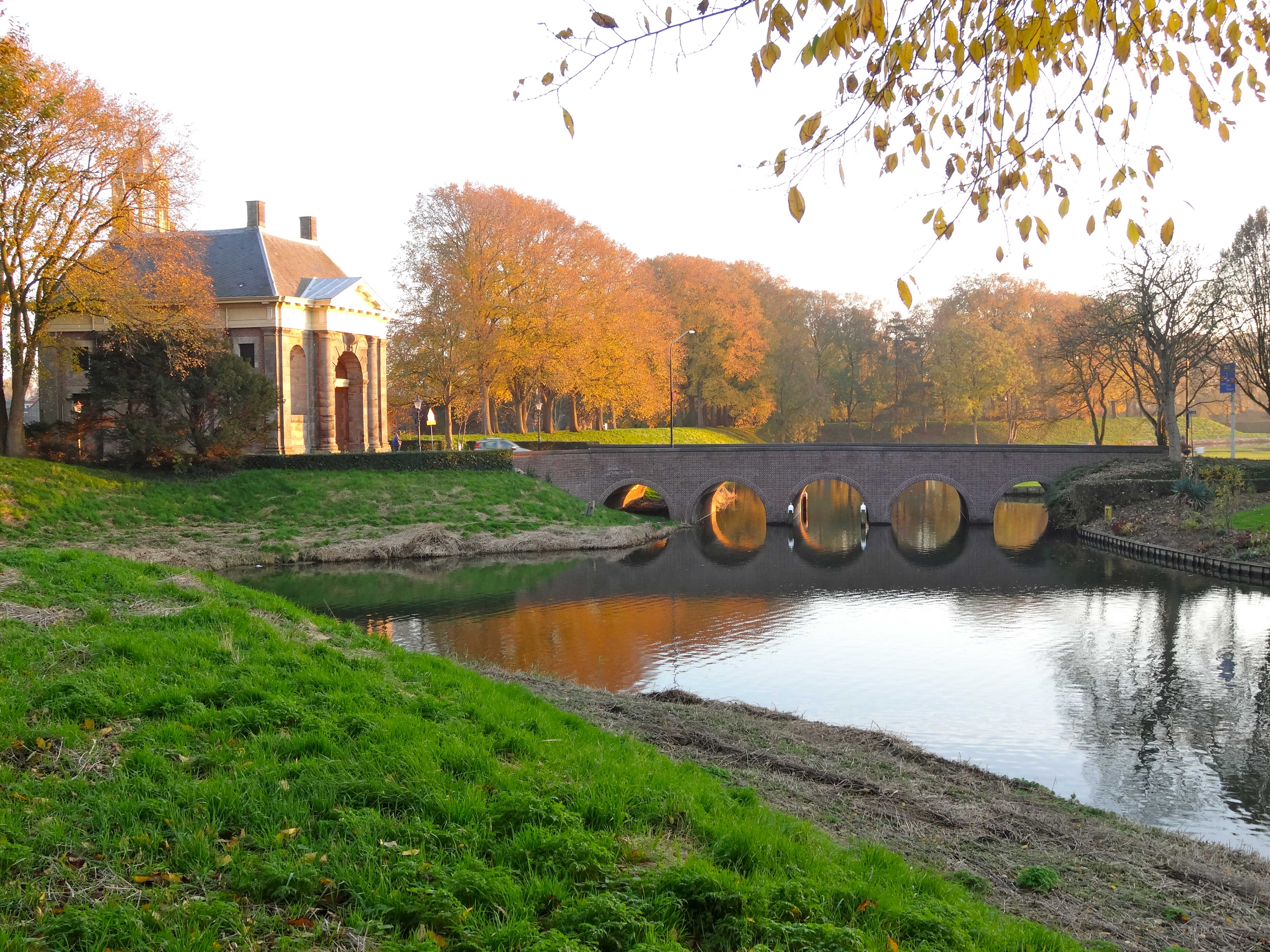
Koepoort seen from the north
