= Weipoort =

- Village
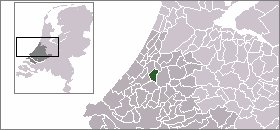

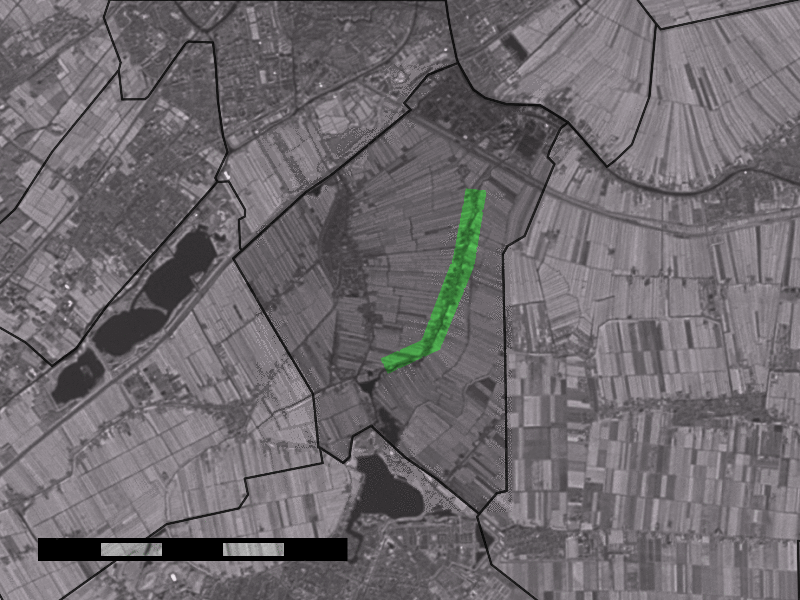
- Weipoort in the municipality of Zoeterwoude.
- Coordinates: 52°6′40″N 4°31′18″E
- Country: Netherlands
- Province: South Holland
- Municipality: Zoeterwoude

Area
  - Total: 1.15 km^{2} (0.44 sq mi)

Population
  - Total: 390
  - Density: 340/km^{2} (880/sq mi)
- Time zone: UTC+1 (CET)
  - Summer (DST): UTC+2 (CEST)

Weipoort is a village in the Dutch province of South Holland. It is a part of the municipality of Zoeterwoude, and lies about 6 km north of Zoetermeer.

The statistical area "Weipoort", which also can include the surrounding countryside, has a population of around 400.
