= Westeinde, Zoeterwoude =

Westeinde
- Village
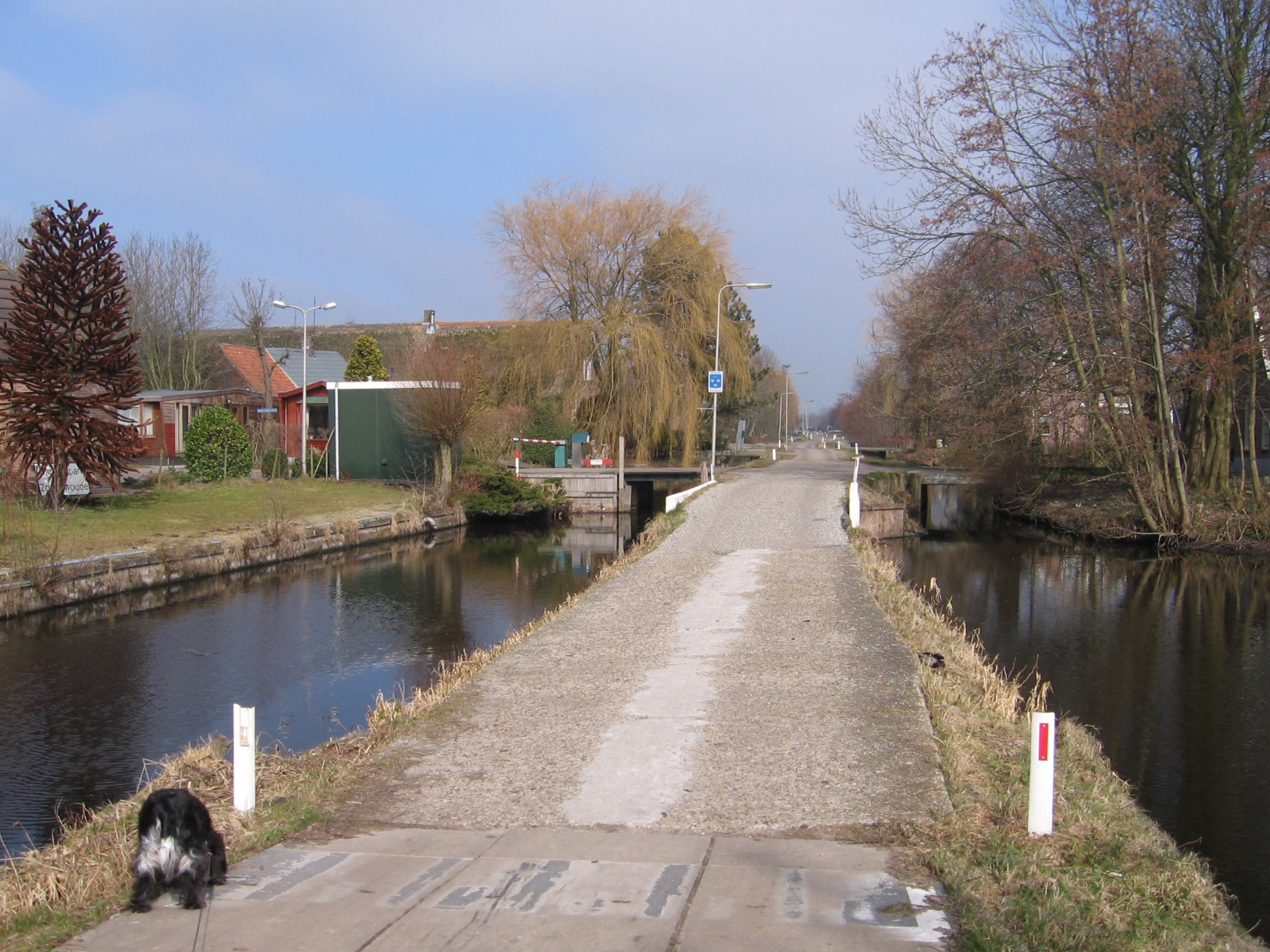

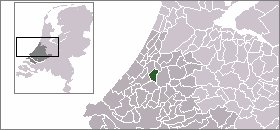

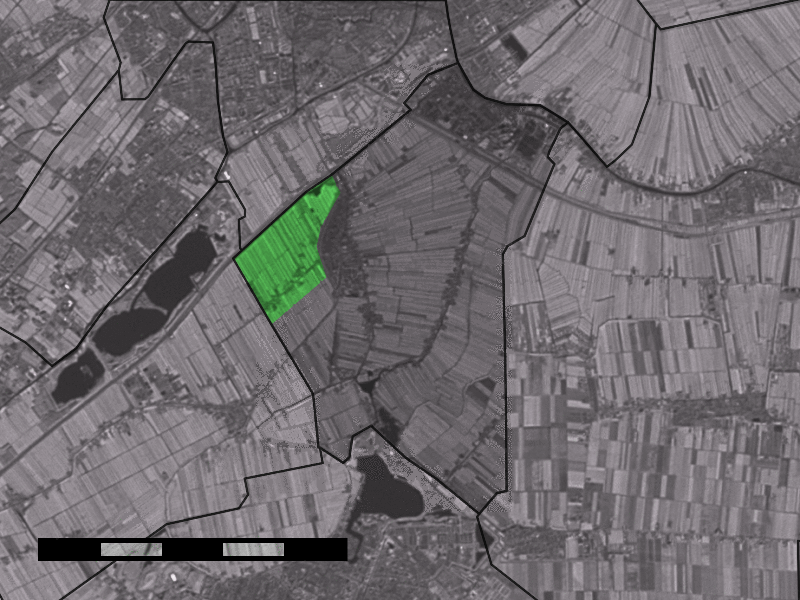
- Westeinde in the municipality of Zoeterwoude.
- Coordinates: 52°6′53″N 4°29′9″E
- Country: Netherlands
- Province: South Holland
- Municipality: Zoeterwoude

Population
  - Total: 110
- Time zone: UTC+1 (CET)
  - Summer (DST): UTC+2 (CEST)

Westeinde is a village in the Dutch province of South Holland. It is a part of the municipality of Zoeterwoude, and lies about 6 km north of Zoetermeer.

The statistical area "Westeinde", which also can include the surrounding countryside, has a population of around 110.
