= Westeinde, North Holland =

Westeinde
- Hamlet
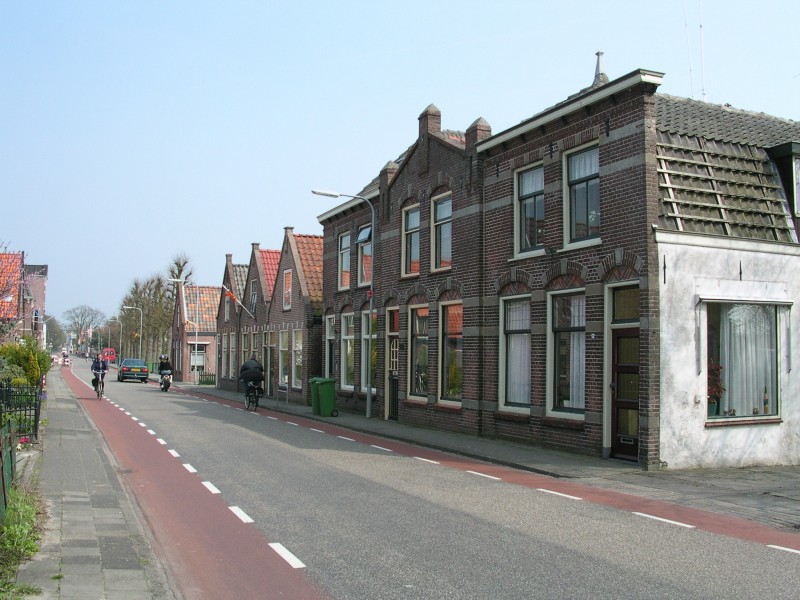

- Location in the Netherlands Location in the province of North Holland in the Netherlands
- Coordinates: 52°42′3″N 5°15′51″E
- Country: Netherlands
- Province: North Holland
- Municipality: Enkhuizen

Area
  - Total: 1.11 km^{2} (0.43 sq mi)
- Elevation: 1.2 m (3.9 ft)

Population (2025)
  - Total: 220
  - Density: 200/km^{2} (510/sq mi)
- Time zone: UTC+1 (CET)
  - Summer (DST): UTC+2 (CEST)
- Postal code: 1601
- Dialing code: 0228

Westeinde is a hamlet in the municipality of Enkhuizen in the Dutch province of North Holland.

Westeinde is located exactly between Bovenkarspel and the former city wall of Enkhuizen, adjacent to the Koepoort. Formally, Westeinde is a part of Enkhuizen. Westeinde is the most eastern point of De Streek.

Westeinde arose as a habitation just outside Enkhuizen's city walls. To this day, all along the road to which Westeinde originated are houses and businesses. The most important businesses in Westeinde are seed companies.

== Gallery ==
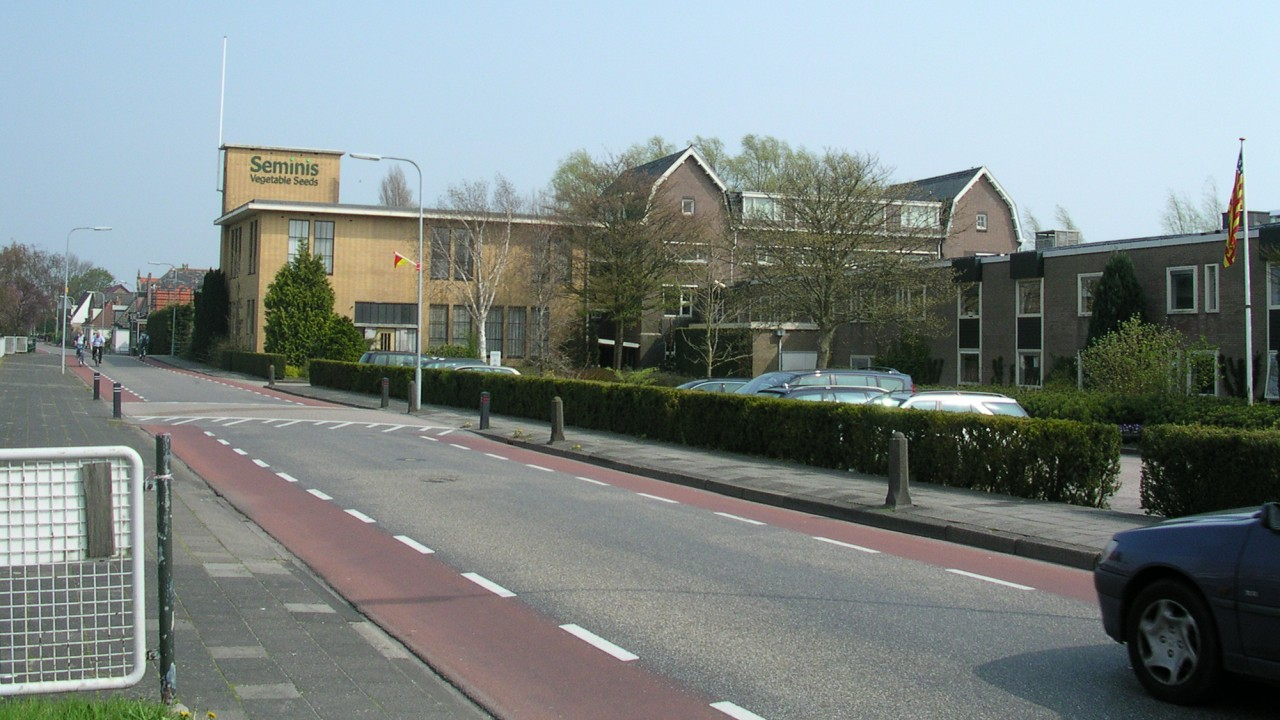
The formal Royal Sluis, one of the seed companies in Westeinde.
