= Zuidbuurt =

- Town
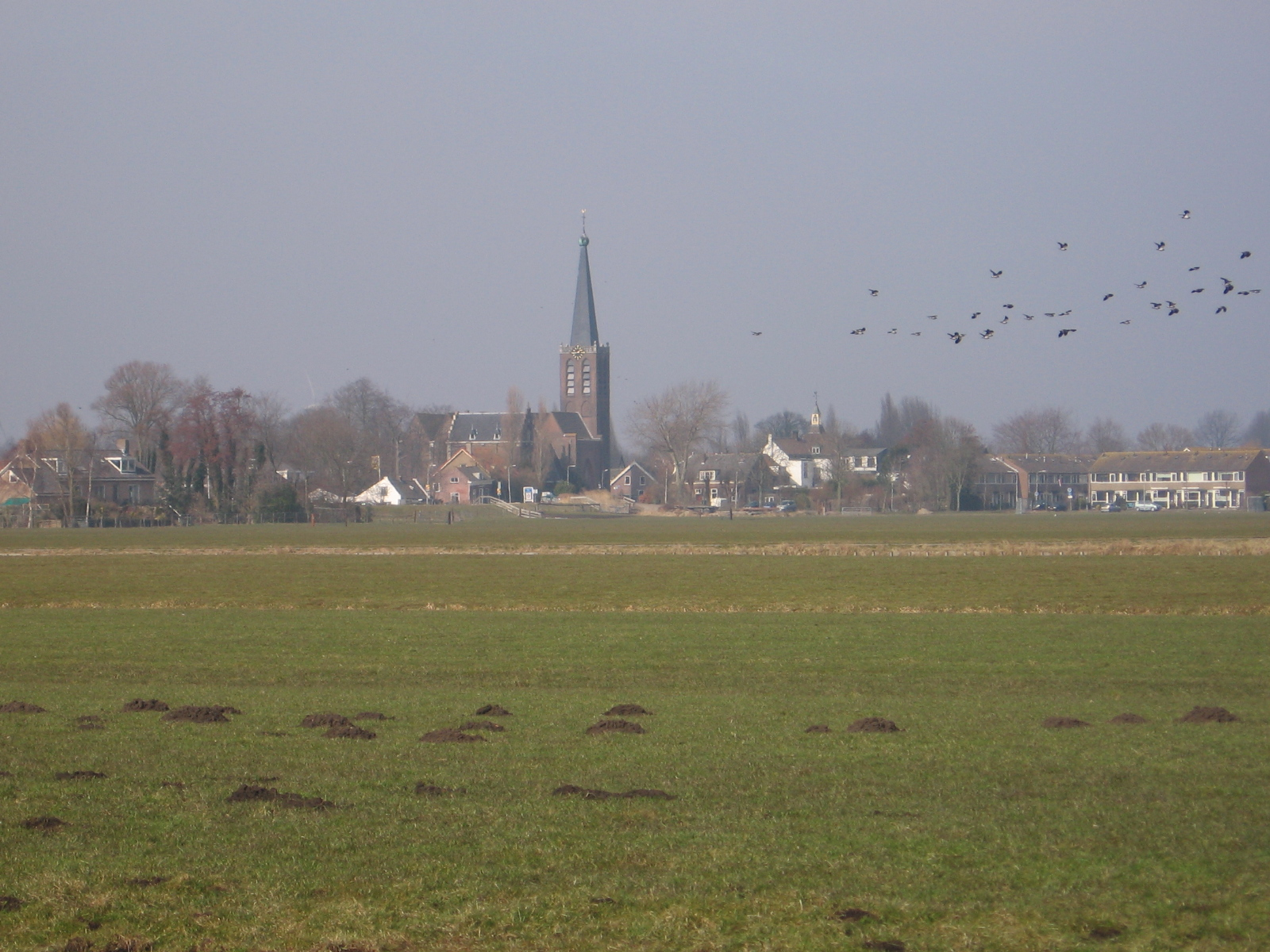

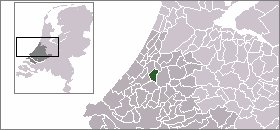

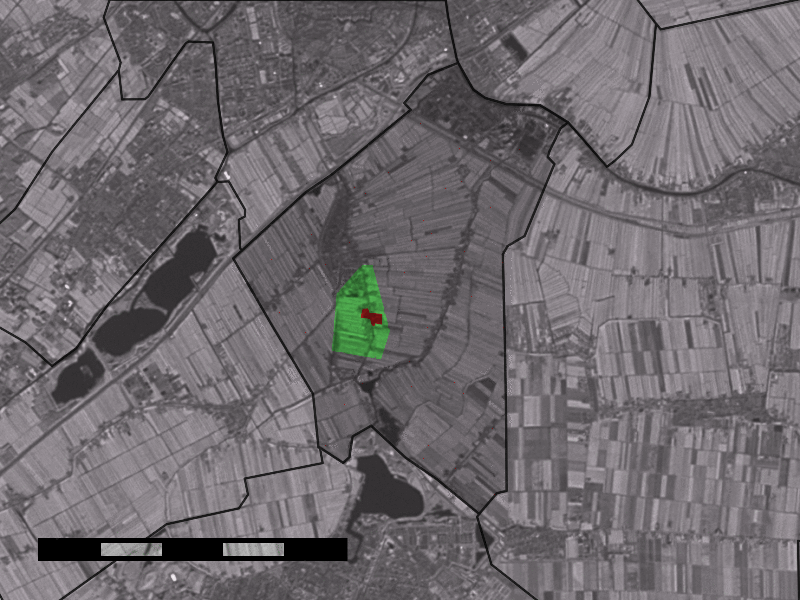
- The town centre (red) and the statistical district (light green) of Zuidbuurt in the municipality of Zoeterwoude.
- Coordinates: 52°6′34″N 4°30′19″E
- Country: Netherlands
- Province: South Holland
- Municipality: Zoeterwoude

Area
  - Total: 1.03 km^{2} (0.40 sq mi)

Population
  - Total: 780
  - Density: 760/km^{2} (2,000/sq mi)
- Time zone: UTC+1 (CET)
  - Summer (DST): UTC+2 (CEST)

Zuidbuurt is a village in the Dutch province of South Holland. It is a part of the municipality of Zoeterwoude, and lies about 6 km north of Zoetermeer.

In 2001 Zuidbuurt had 325 inhabitants. The built-up area of the town was 0.050 km², and contained 130 residences. The statistical area "Zuidbuurt", which also can include the peripheral parts of the village, as well as the surrounding countryside, has a population of around 410.
