= Westeinde, Drenthe =

Westeinde
- Hamlet
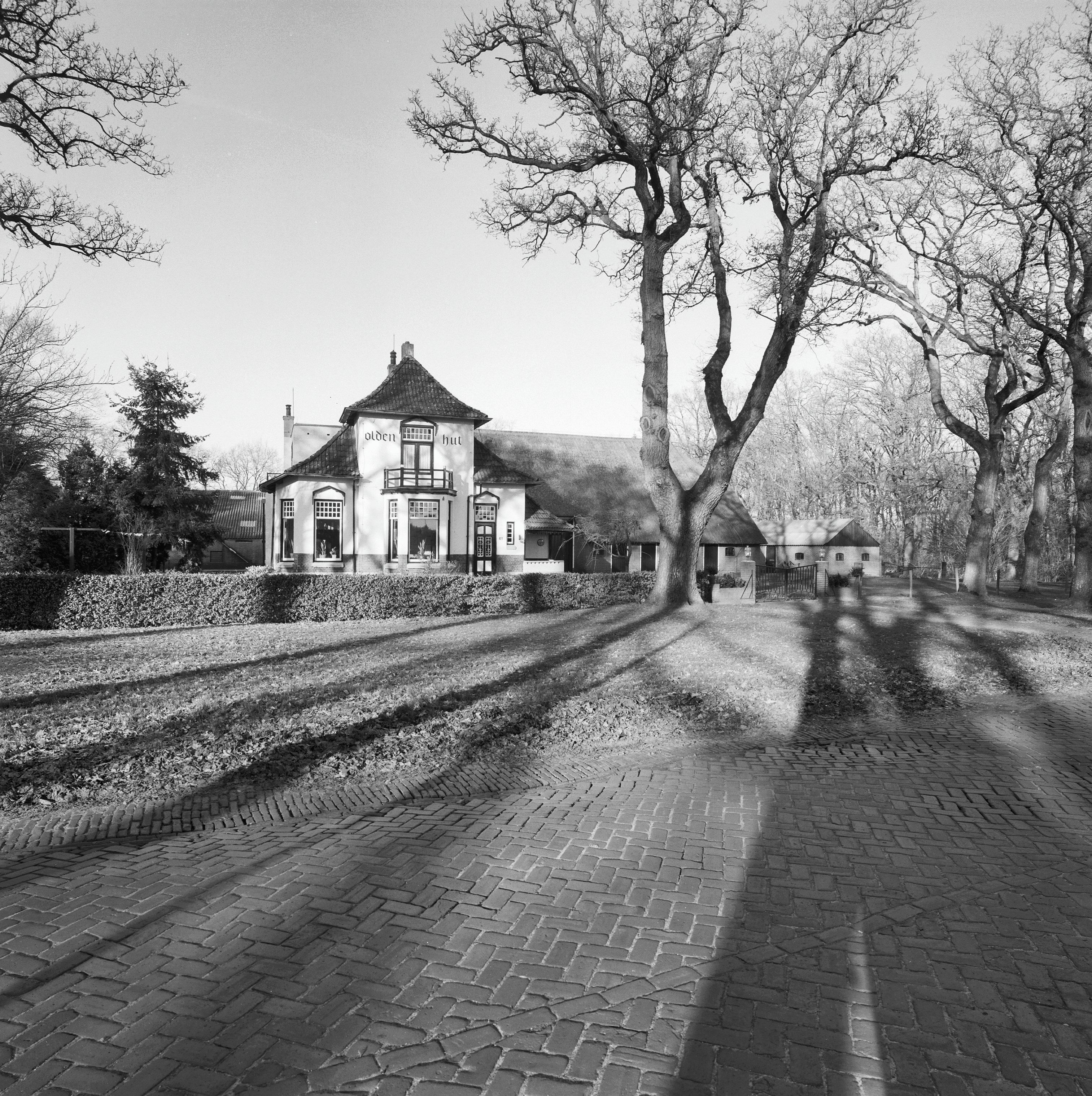
- Farm in Westeinde

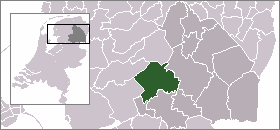

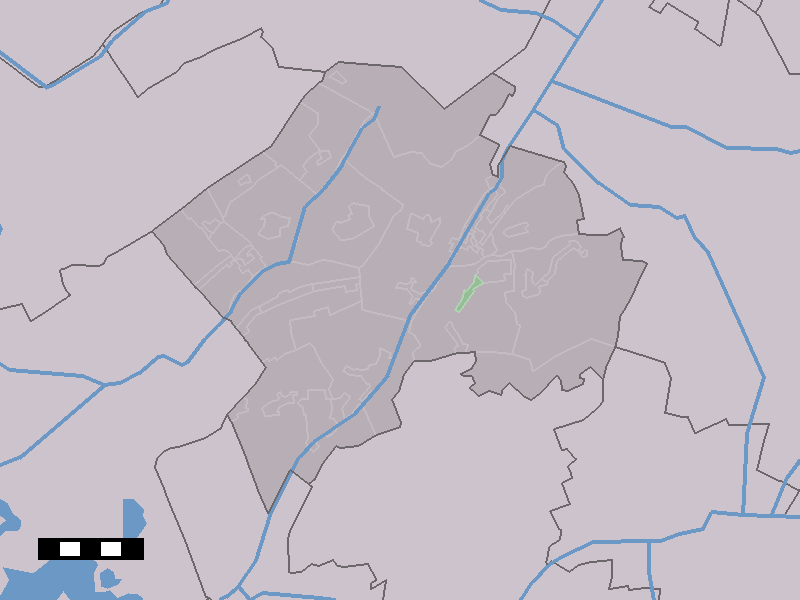
- Westeinde in the municipality of Westerveld.
- Coordinates: 52°49′30″N 6°20′57″E
- Country: Netherlands
- Province: Drenthe
- Municipality: Westerveld

Population (1 November 2007)
  - Total: 150
- Time zone: UTC+1 (CET)
  - Summer (DST): UTC+2 (CEST)
- Postal code: 7991

Westeinde is a hamlet in the Dutch province of Drenthe. It is part of the town Dwingeloo and of the municipality of Westerveld. The name Westeinde means 'western end' and alludes to the fact that it lies west of Dwingeloo. Westeinde lies about 14 km northwest of Hoogeveen.

The statistical area "Westeinde", which also includes the surrounding countryside, consists of around 50 villas and large estates and has a population of around 130.

Westeinde is characterized by the presence of one of the four Havezates (a large manor reserved for the nobility) that were built in or near Dwingeloo, namely Oldengaerde. The estate dates back to the first half of the 15th century. In 1808, the estate was purchased by Jonkheer Aalt Willem van Holthe, who was the mayor of Dwingeloo from 1812 to 1852. Oldengaerde has remained in his family ever since, and his descendants have decorated the Westeinde with villas such as De Bork (1910), Olden Hut (1916), Nije Batinghe (1923, named after another Havezathe 'Batinghe') and Nyengaerde (1926, named after Oldengaerde).
