= Zoeterwoude-Rijndijk =

- Village
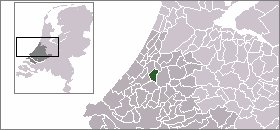

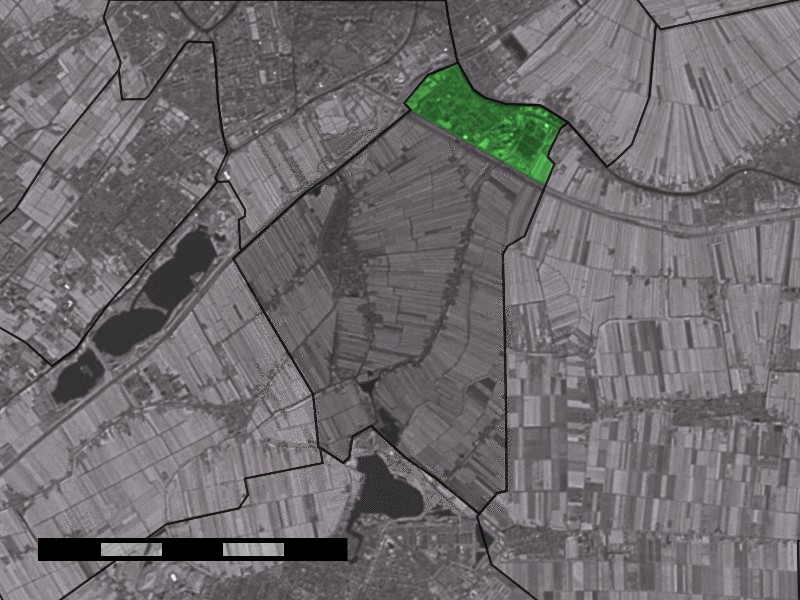
- Zoeterwoude-Rijndijk in the municipality of Zoeterwoude.
- Coordinates: 52°8′32″N 4°31′32″E
- Country: Netherlands
- Province: South Holland
- Municipality: Zoeterwoude

Area
  - Total: 2.23 km^{2} (0.86 sq mi)

Population
  - Total: 2,800
  - Density: 1,300/km^{2} (3,300/sq mi)
- Time zone: UTC+1 (CET)
  - Summer (DST): UTC+2 (CEST)

Zoeterwoude-Rijndijk is a village in the Dutch province of South Holland. It is a part of the municipality of Zoeterwoude, and lies about 5 km (3 mi) southeast of Leiden.

The statistical area "Zoeterwoude-Rijndijk", which also can include the surrounding countryside, has a population of around 2770.

Since 1975 a Heineken brewery is located in this town.

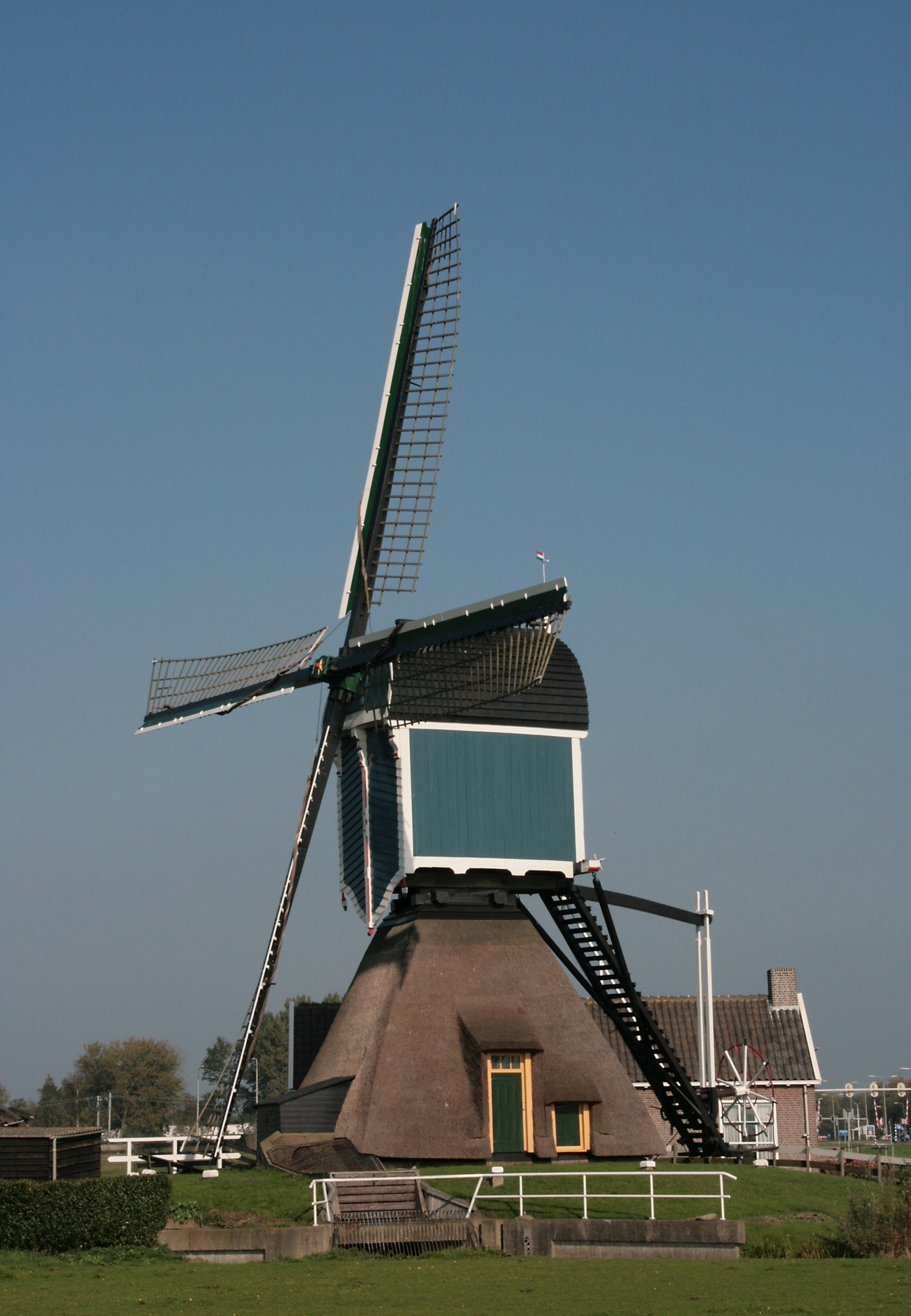
Grote Molen (Big Windmill)
