= Cuyp =

The surname Cuyp (sometimes spelled Kuyp) is shared by three painters who lived during the Dutch Golden Age:

- Jacob Gerritsz. Cuyp (1594–1651 or 1652)
- his half-brother Benjamin Gerritsz Cuyp (1612–1652)
- Jacob's son Aelbert Cuyp (1620–1691), the most famous of the three
