= Equestrian Portrait of Cornelis and Michiel Pompe van Meerdervoort with Their Tutor and Coachman =

Painting by Aelbert Cuyp

- Starting for the Hunt
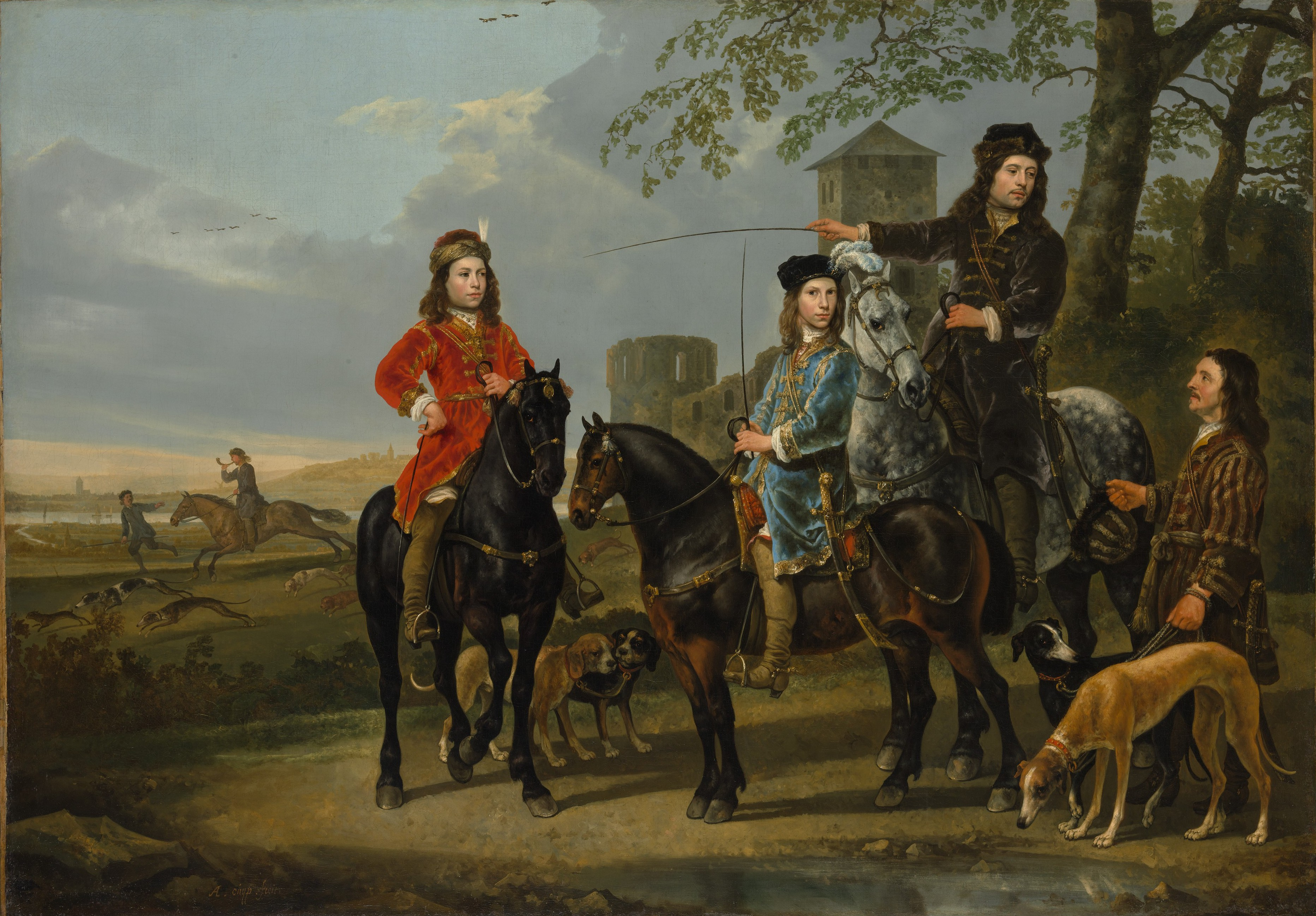
- Artist: Aelbert Cuyp
- Year: c. 1652–1653
- Medium: Oil on canvas
- Dimensions: 109.9 cm × 156.2 cm (43.25 in × 61.5 in)
- Location: Metropolitan Museum of Art, New York
- Accession: 32.100.20

Equestrian Portrait of Cornelis and Michiel Pompe van Meerdervoort with Their Tutor and Coachman, also known as Starting for the Hunt, is an oil-on-canvas painting executed ca. 1652–53 by Aelbert Cuyp, now in the Metropolitan Museum of Art in New York.

Cuyp mainly painted landscapes, but these often included anonymous riders in compositions similar to this. By contrast, few of his paintings are portraits. This portrait is an early example of an equestrian portrait of someone who was not a member of court; previously, equestrian portraits had been restricted to only the high nobility and royalty, but in this period in the Netherlands, this was changing, and Cuyp and his father, Jacob Gerritszoon Cuyp, led this change, with the encouragement of Cornelis van Beveren.

The painting shows two young men, brothers Cornelis Pompe van Meerdervoort (left) and Michiel Pompe van Meerdervoort, with their tutor, Caulier, their coachman, Willem, and dogs. In the background of the image, there is a ruined castle, likely intended to indicate the ancient lineage of those pictured. The castle does not look like the Huis te Meerdervoort, the family home of the Pompe van Meerdervoort, located across the Oude Maas from Dordrecht and to the south of Zwijndrecht. The castle was originally painted in the left middleground, before it was repainted on the right. In the left of the background, sailboats can be seen on the river Rhine and the churches and associated buildings of Hoog-Elten, Rindern, and Laag-Elten.

== Details ==
The background is believed to have been sourced from Cuyp's Drawing of Rhine near Elten. Despite this background, there is no known connection between the Pompe van Meerdervoort family and that region. However, a 1994 guide to the Met notes that the landscape near Elten is similar to that of Dordrecht.

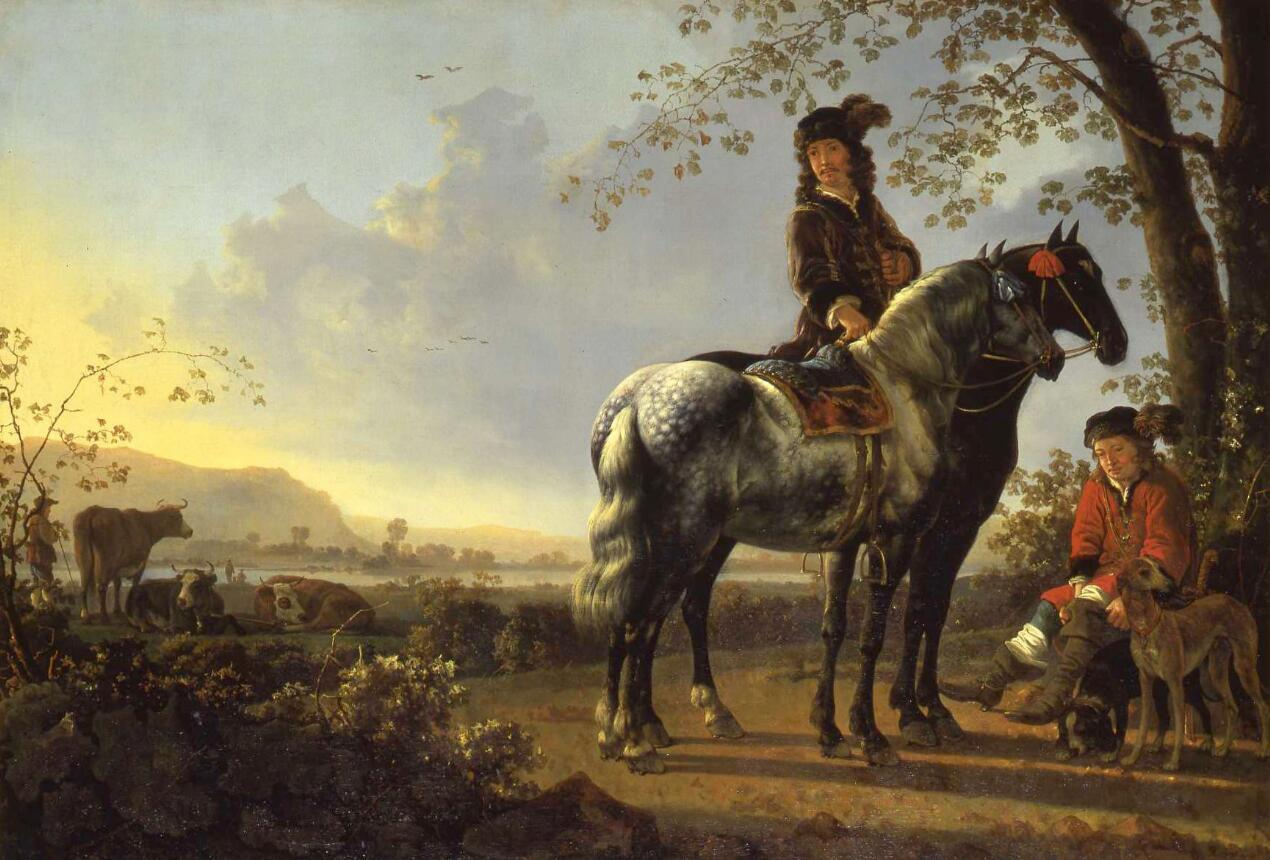
Cuyp's Horsemen Resting in a Landscape; they also wear fancy Eastern European costumes. Late 1650s.

The dogs are believed to be greyhounds and foxhounds, while the animal on the left of the painting is thought to be a hare. The clothing worn by those pictured would not have been common in the Netherlands and has been described as both Hungarian and Persian. The two boys and their riding instructor are wearing tight-fitting coats, known as dolmans, while the coachman is wearing a looser and heavier coat, known as a mente. The cap worn by Cornelis is similar to a Turkish turban. It has been observed that the heads of the figures are awkwardly painted and this had been attributed to Cuyp's primary focus on landscape painting. The hand gesture of Caulier was originally simply a direction, but would later have been viewed as an indication of who would quickly become the sole heir of the close family.

== Provenance ==
It is most likely that the painting was commissioned by Adriana van Beveren, the widowed mother of the two young men, who is known to have been the first owner of the painting. However, it is also possible that the painting was commissioned by their uncle, Matthijs van Slingelandt, or her father, Cornelis van Beveren. After the death of Adriana van Beveren, it passed to Cornelis Pompe van Meerdervoort. It then was passed down through the family with the Huis te Meerdervoort until 1806, when it was sold by Christina Elisabeth Pompe van Meerdervoort, the great granddaughter of Cornelis. It was sold on August 20, 1806 in The Hague as Hunting Party with Three Men on Horses and a Hunter with Dogs in Foreground for 695 Dutch guilders.

On April 19–20, 1825, it was sold at the Galerie Lebrun in Paris as Le Partie de Chasse for 17,950 French francs. On May 1–2, 1829, it was sold in London as La Partie de Chasse du Prince d'Orange for £1,102.10. On June 17, 1848, it was sold at Christie's in London as Prince of Orange on a grey horse for £556.10. On May 9–10, 1895, it was again sold at Christie's as The Prince of Orange, with his sons, prepared to depart for the Chase for £2,100. On June 9, 1911, it was sold at the Galerie Georges Petit in Paris as Départ pour la chasse for either 160,000 or 170,000 francs. On June 14, 1913, it was again sold at the Galerie Georges Petit for 145,000 francs. On June 23, 1922, it was sold for the final time at the Galerie Georges Petit for 62,000 francs to Michael Friedsam, who held it until his death, at which time it was bequeathed to the Met. Since being acquired by the Met, it has been exhibited in many other museums in the United States and the Netherlands, including the National Gallery of Art in Washington D.C., the Rijksmuseum in Amsterdam, the Dordrechts Museum, and the Museum of Fine Arts in Boston.
