= The Maas at Dordrecht =

Painting by Aelbert Cuyp

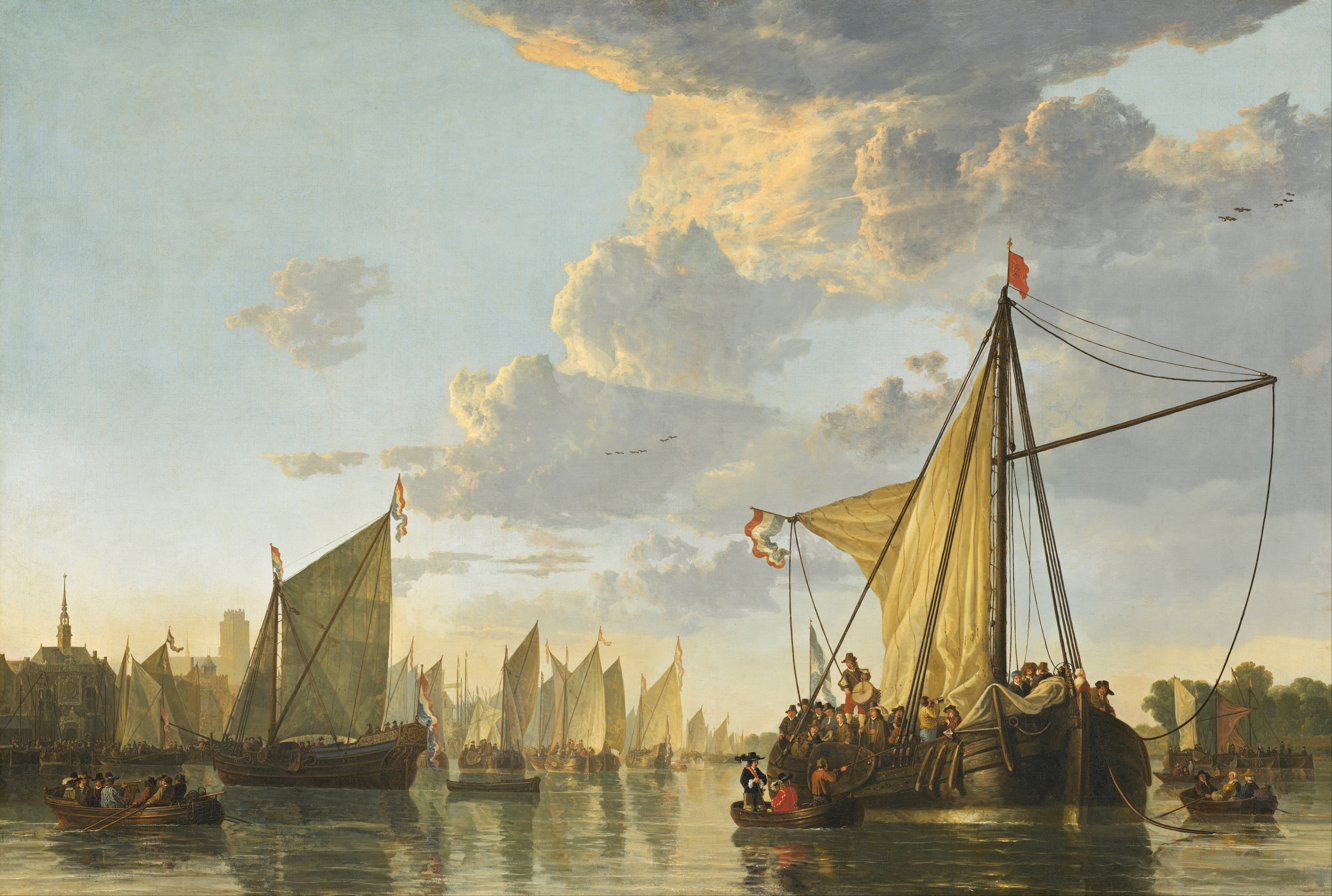
- Artist: Aelbert Cuyp
- Year: c. 1650
- Medium: Oil on canvas
- Movement: Dutch Golden Age
- Dimensions: 114.9 cm × 170.2 cm (45.2 in × 67.0 in)
- Location: National Gallery of Art, Washington, D.C.

The Maas at Dordrecht is an oil-on-canvas painting by the Dutch painter Aelbert Cuyp, completed c. 1650. It depicts ships in the river Maas in the city of Dordrecht, the Netherlands. The painting is done in the Dutch Golden Age style. It is held by the National Gallery of Art, in Washington, D.C..

== Context ==
In July 1646, a large Dutch transport fleet carrying 30,000 soldiers gathered in Dordrecht. It was a show of force by the northern provinces who were fighting for independence from the Spanish crown in the Dutch Revolt.
