= Barent van Kalraet =

Dutch painter

Barent van Kalraet, or Barent Pietersz Calraat (16 August 1649 – 9 February 1737) was a Dutch Golden Age painter and the younger brother of Abraham Calraet.

== Biography ==
Van Kalraet was born and died in Dordrecht. He learned to paint from his brother Abraham, and he later became a pupil of Aelbert Cuyp. He changed his style several times, and in later life took to painting Rhine landscapes in the manner of Herman Saftleven. He was still painting when Houbraken was writing his book, but it was more a hobby than a business for him.

He resided throughout his life in Dordrecht, and made copies after the landscape artists Cuyp and Saftleven, but also Jan Both, Cornelis van Poelenburch, Philip Wouwerman and Willem de Heusch.
