= River Landscape with Riders =

Painting by Aelbert Cuyp

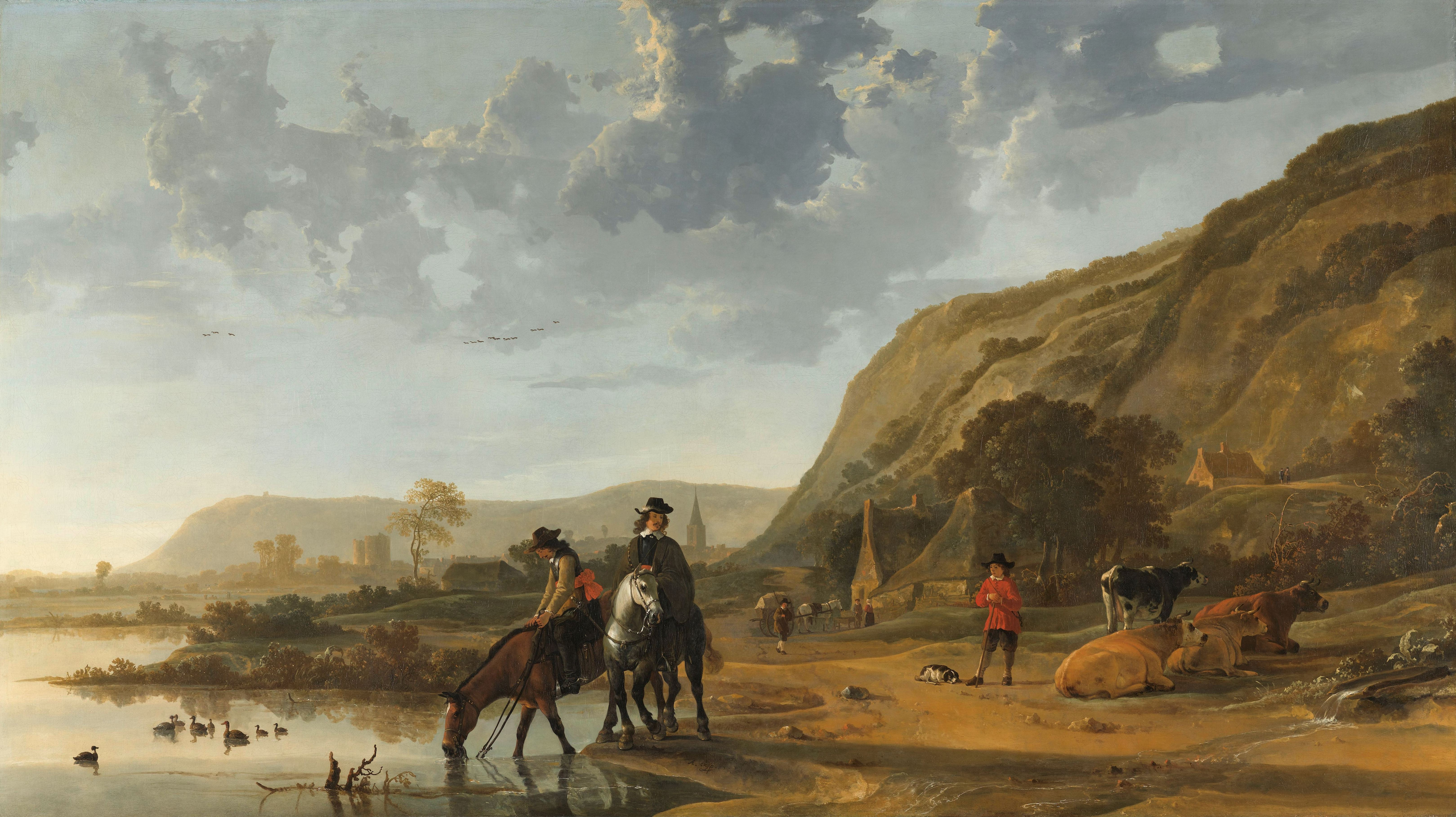
- Artist: Aelbert Cuyp
- Year: c.1653-1657
- Medium: canvas, oil paint
- Dimensions: 128 cm (50 in) × 227.5 cm (89.6 in)
- Location: Rijksmuseum, Netherlands
- Accession no.: SK-A-4118
- Identifiers: RKDimages ID: 21971

River Landscape with Riders is an oil-on-canvas painting by the Dutch artist Aelbert Cuyp, created c. 1653–1657, now in the Rijksmuseum in Amsterdam, which bought it in 1965 from the Edmond de Rothschild collection in Exbury, Hampshire. The painting is signed at the bottom center 'A. Cuijp'.

== Description ==
The painting depicts an idyllic scene in which two Dutch officers on horseback pause by a river to let their horses drink. A herdsmen watches while guarding his cows, who rest peacefully, like his dog. Some ducks are seen in the river. In the middle distance are typical Dutch houses and some country people with a wagon. A mountain extends on the right side. In the background is the view of a city, with a visible tower. The cloudy blue sky occupies a large part of the upper canvas, extending to the left.

The mountainous landscape is based on those seen along the River Rhine between Nijmegen and Kleve. Cuyp made various landscape drawings in this area in the early 1650s, which he further elaborated in his studio in Dordrecht.
