= Abraham van Calraet =

Dutch Golden Age painter and engraver

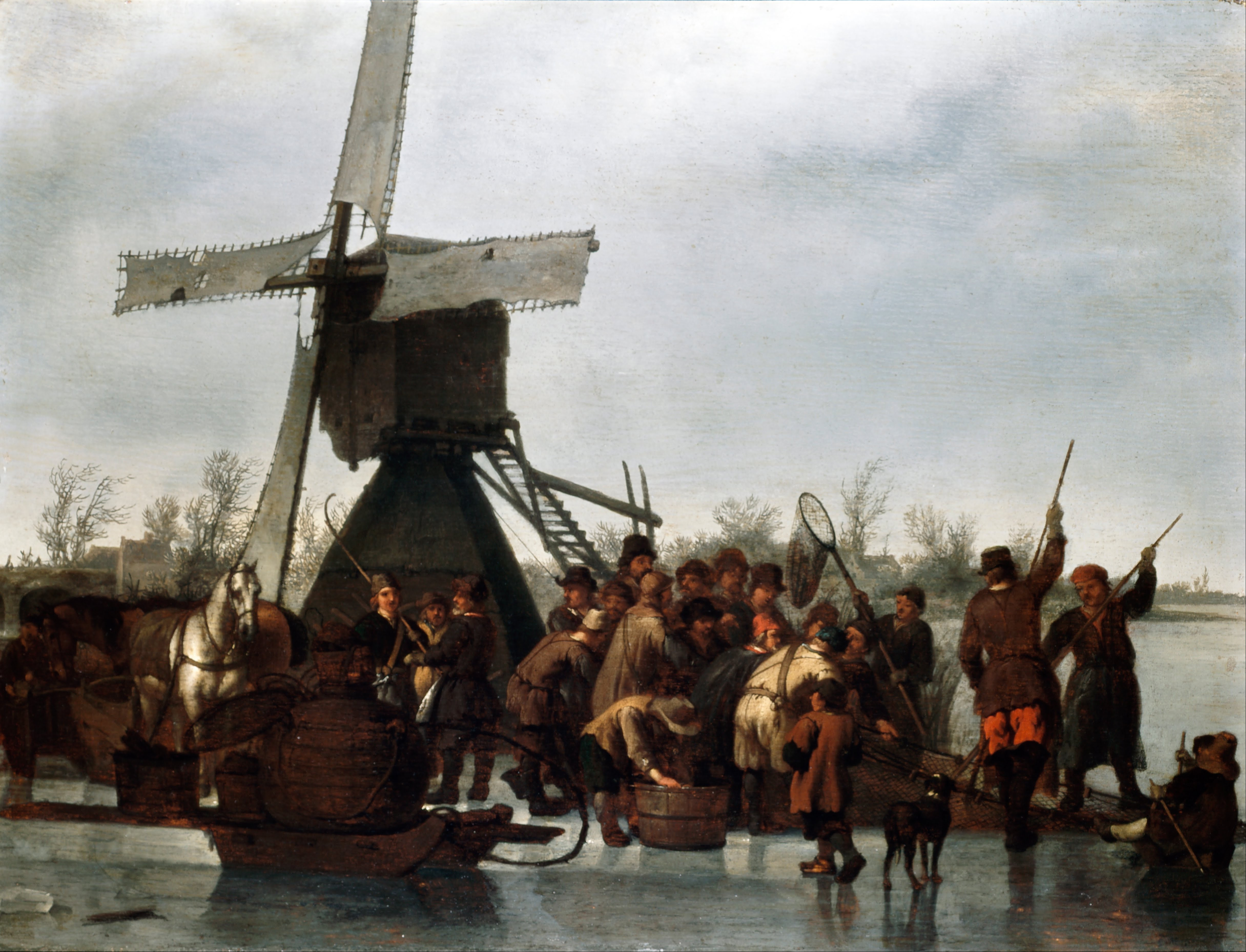
Van Calraet, Abraham - Fishing on the Ice - Google Art Project

Abraham van Calraet, or Kalraat (7–12 October 1642, Dordrecht – 11 June 1722, Dordrecht) was a Dutch Golden Age still-life, portrait- and landscape painter.

== Biography ==
He was the eldest son of Pieter Jansz. van Calraet, who came to Dordrecht from Utrecht. He learned to sculp from AEmilius and Samuel Hup, who were well known sculptors. After learning to sculpt, young Abraham took to the painter's brush, and started on fruit, while helping his father, who was a wood sculptor.

He resided throughout his life in Dordrecht, and may have been a pupil of Aelbert Cuyp, who was a generation older and had the same initials (AC). Cuyp's signature was often forged on top of Calraet's paintings.

Abraham Bredius was responsible for the first "rediscovery" of this painter, re-attributing two of his still life paintings that at that time were considered to be by Cuyp. Cornelis Hofstede de Groot strongly disagreed with him and the Cuyp-Calraet question was escalated in the Dutch newspapers after Frits Lugt announced a new Abraham Calraet painting in the Frans Hals Museum in 1915. Bredius "won" the argument and many of his attributions still stand today.

Calraet is known today for still life pieces with fruit, and recently also for landscapes with horses. He was the teacher of his younger brother, the landscape painter Barent van Kalraet.
