= Piping Shepherds =

Painting by Aelbert Cuyp

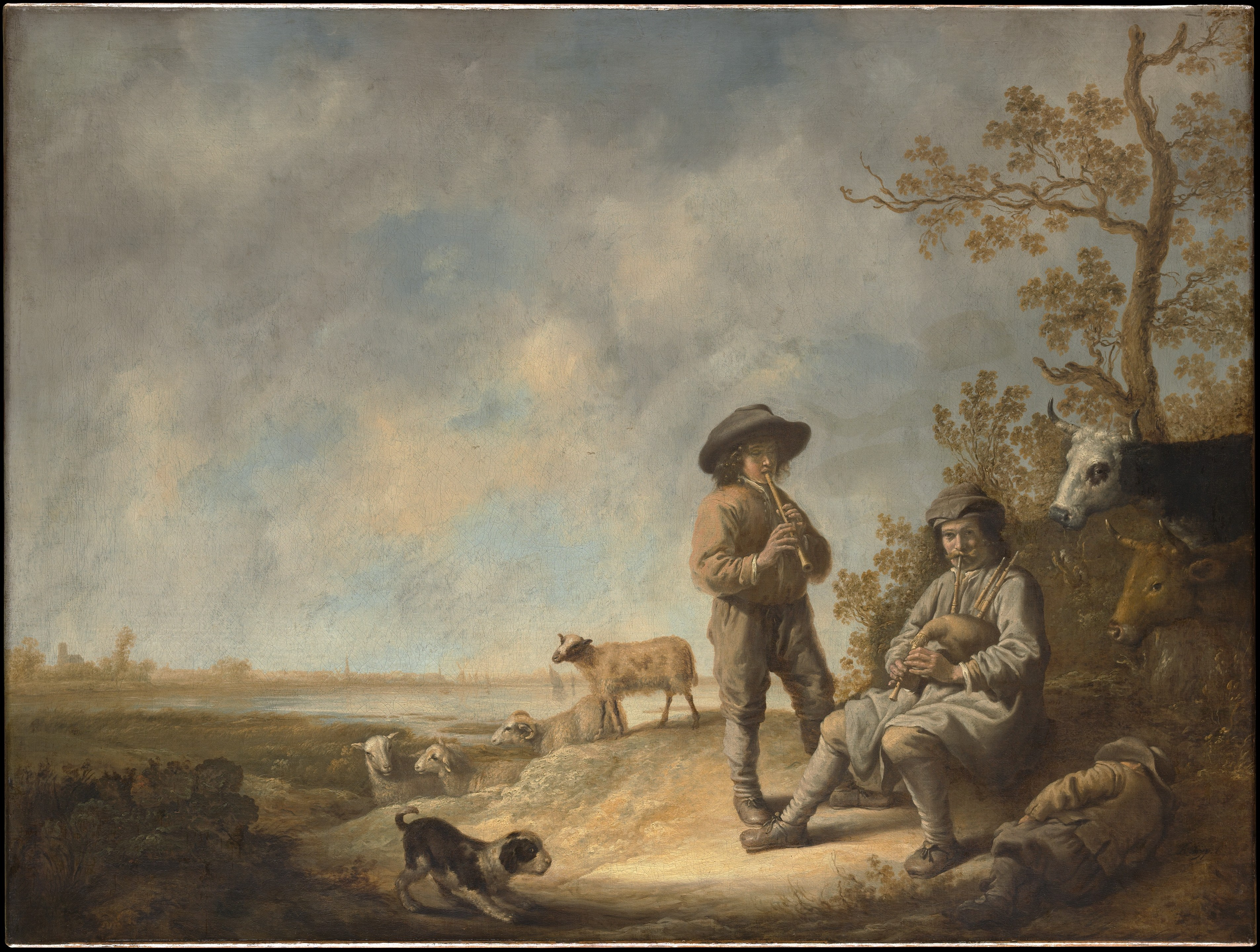
- Artist: Aelbert Cuyp
- Year: 1643-1644
- Medium: Oil on canvas
- Dimensions: 90.8 cm × 119.4 cm (35.7 in × 47.0 in)
- Location: Metropolitan Museum of Art, New York

Piping Shepherds is an oil-on-canvas painting created in 1643–44 by the Dutch artist Aelbert Cuyp. The work is in the collection of the Metropolitan Museum of Art, in New York.

== Description ==
The painting depicts two shepherds who are playing a tune on their instruments, enjoying a moment of leisure, with a third lying besides them. One of them, an older man, who is seated, plays the bagpipe, while the other, a child, standing, plays the flute. Two cows look at the scene, from the right, while their abandoned flock wanders nearby. In the foreground, a dog seems to remind them of their duty. A landscape, with the sea and a city visible, is seen at the left.
