= A Page with Two Horses =

1650s painting by Aelbert Cuyp

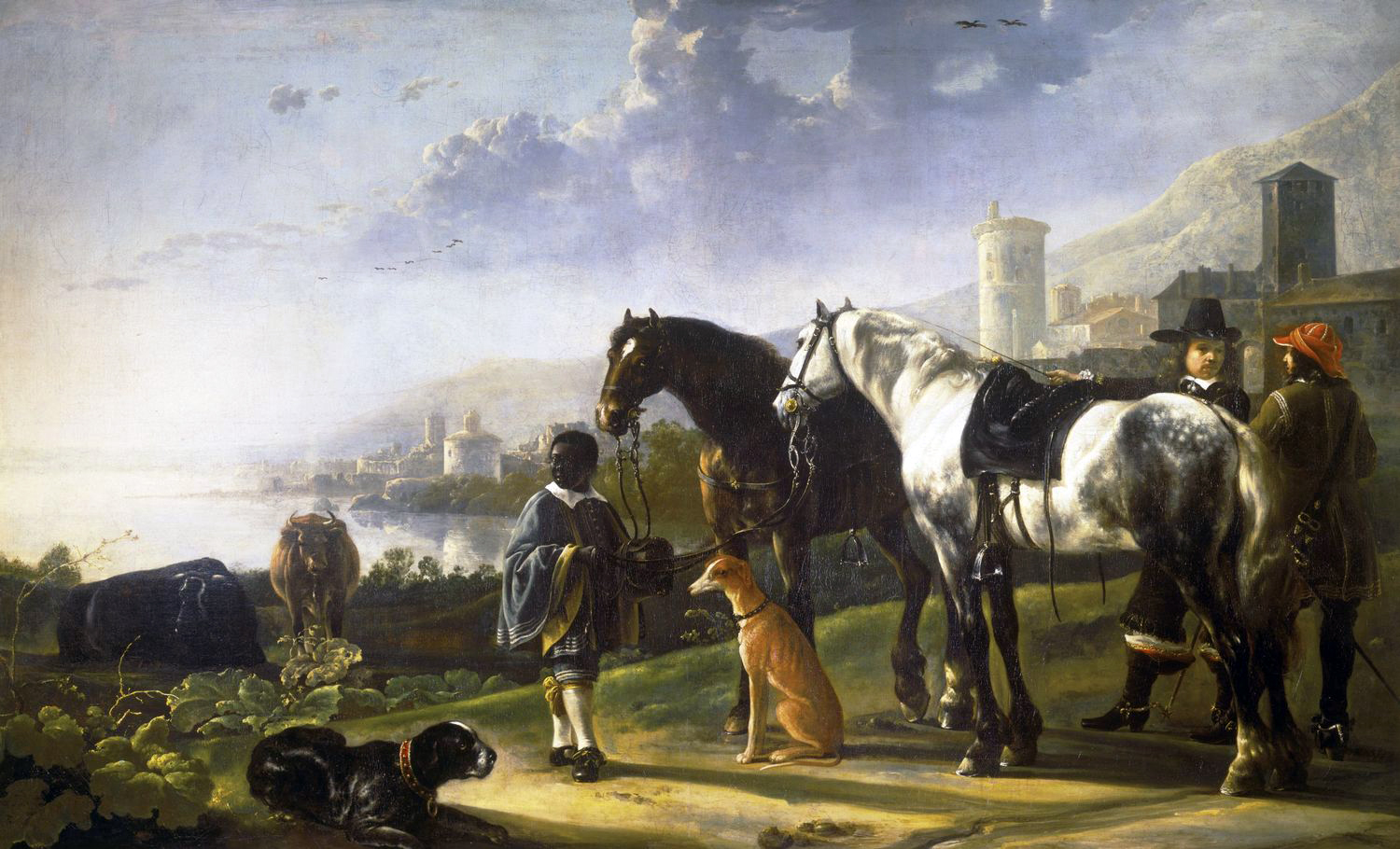
- Artist: Aelbert Cuyp
- Year: c.1655
- Medium: Oil on canvas
- Dimensions: 143.2 cm × 228.1 cm (143.2 cm × 228.1 cm)
- Owner: Royal Collection

A Page with Two Horses (historically known as The Negro Page) is a painting by Aelbert Cuyp. It is believed to have been completed between c.1655-1657. It is in the Royal Collection.

== Description ==
It is believed to have been painted by Aelbert Cuyp between c.1655-1657.

The work has been described by the Royal Collection as either an equestrian portrait of a noted subject or a "general evocation of journeying south" with an imaginary subject. The Royal Collection describes the work as "rather grand for an equestrian caprice rather than an equestrian portrait" but feels the scale of the work is typical of late 17th-century Dutch art. Interpretation of the painting remains "allusive and open-ended", with the open setting of the piece suggesting journeying rather than arrival at a specific castle.

The nobleman in the painting has been identified as possibly being Willem van Beveren, the son of the Dutch nobleman Cornelis van Beveren.

The Morgan Library & Museum has a 17th-century copy of a study by Cuyp of milk cans, cows and a milkmaid, with the cow in the drawing being based on the one in A Page with Two Horses.

== History ==
The painting had possibly previously been in the collection of the artist Benjamin West in the 18th-century. It was bought by George IV in 1809. In 1819 it was listed as having been displayed in the Rose Satin Room of Carlton House. By 1841 it was on display in the Picture Gallery at Buckingham Palace. In 1975 The Times noted the painting was newly on display at the Queen's Gallery at Buckingham Palace having recently been cleaned and restored, and described it as one of George IV's many "discerning acquisitions". In 1993 it was displayed in the Picture Gallery of Buckingham Palace when it was first opened to the public. In 2016 it was displayed in the drawing room of the private apartments of Prince William, Duke of Cambridge and Catherine, Princess of Cambridge at Kensington Palace. It was on display in their drawing room when they hosted President Barack Obama and his wife Michelle of the United States in 2016. It was reported that aides to the Cambridges tried to unscrew the name plate from the painting to avoid causing offence any offence to the Obamas and a pot plant was placed strategically to obscure the name. By 2023 the painting had been removed from the apartment for several years, and its present location is not known publicly.

In 1858 the page was depicted in an engraving called "The Negro Boy" in The Art Journal magazine. A reviewer for the Bath Weekly Chronicle and Herald wrote that the engraving was "full of beauty and the engraver has caught the true expression in the page's face".
