= Paulus Lesire =

Dutch painter

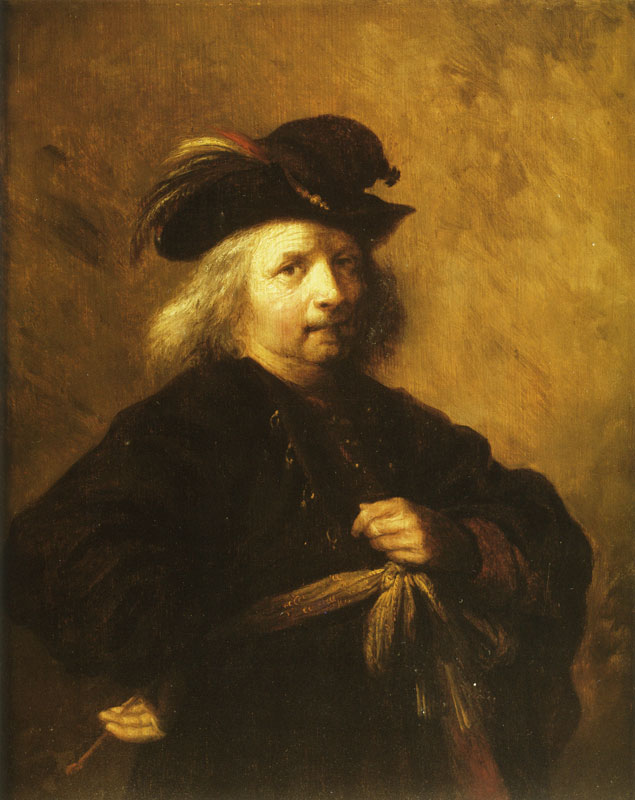
Self-portrait of Lesire.

Paulus Lesire (1611–1654) was a Dutch painter who specialised in history paintings and portraits.

Born in Dordrecht, he was the son of a decorative painter and glass-artist from The Hague. He trained as a painter in Dordrecht and was probably a pupil of Jacob Cuyp, joining the town's Guild of St Luke in 1631. On 10 September 1634 he married Lowize de Claar from the Hague and a few years later moved to the Hague with her. His composition and use of light seems to have been influenced by Rembrandt during the latter's time in Leiden, to which Lesire moved towards the end of his life and where he died.

== Sources ==
- https://archive.org/stream/oudholland06docugoog/oudholland06docugoog_djvu.txt
- http://explore.rkd.nl/nl/explore/artists/49577
