= Cows in a River =

1650 painting by Aelbert Cuyp

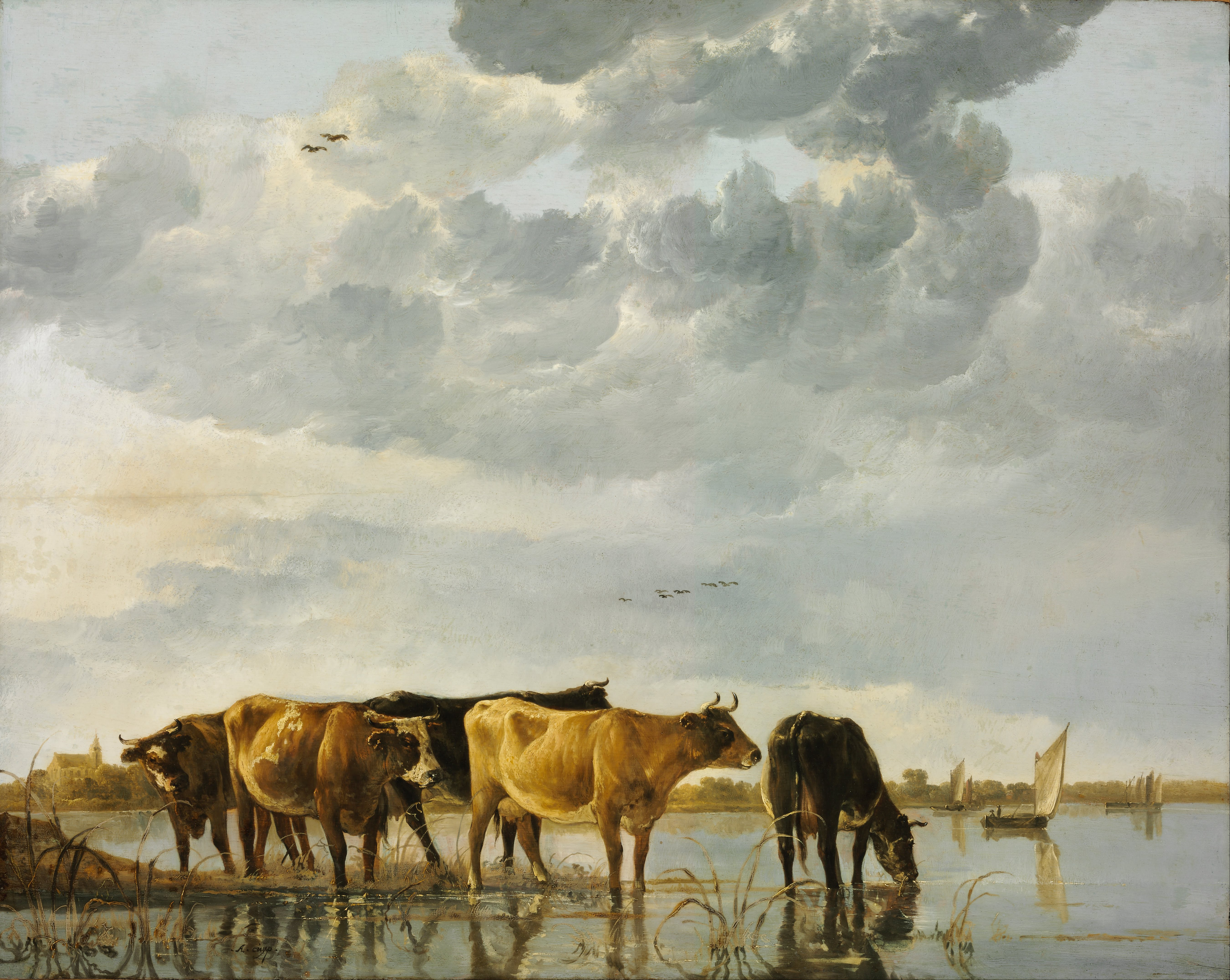
- Artist: Aelbert Cuyp
- Year: 1650
- Medium: Oil on canvas
- Dimensions: 59 cm × 74 cm (23 in × 29 in)
- Location: Museum of Fine Arts; Budapest

Cows in a River is an oil-on-canvas painting of 1650 by the Dutch Golden Age artist Aelbert Cuyp. It is held at the Museum of Fine Arts, in Budapest.

== Description ==
The painting depicts frequent subjects of Cuyp's, cows, and was painted prior to the artist's decamping for Rhineland. The canvas shows a group of five cows near the margin of a river, from which only one appears drinking. Several sailing boats are seen, at the right, in the distance. The cloudy sky shows also several birds in their flight.
