= Benjamin Gerritsz. Cuyp =

Dutch Golden Age landscape painter (1612–1652)

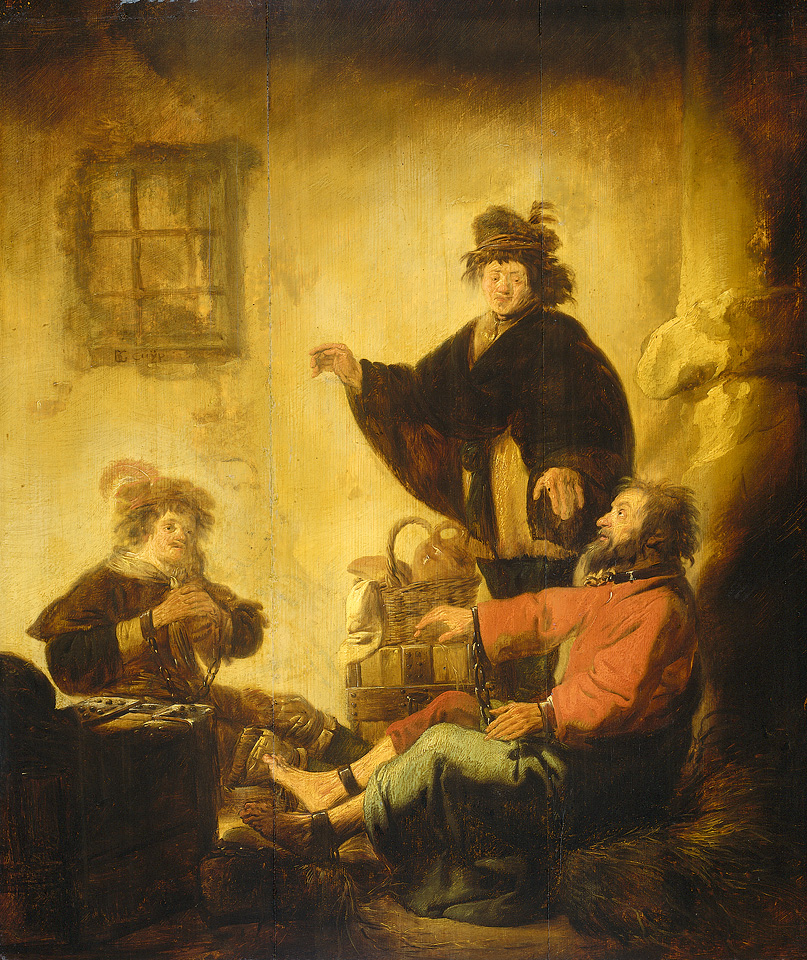
Joseph interpreting the dreams of the baker and the butler, Rijksmuseum Amsterdam

Benjamin Gerritszoon (Note: Abbreviated as Gerritsz.) Cuyp or Cuijp (December 1612 – 28 August 1652) was a Dutch Golden Age landscape painter.

== Biography ==
Cuyp was born and died in Dordrecht, in the Dutch Republic. According to Arnold Houbraken, he was a pupil of his uncle (Jacob Gerritsz. Cuyp) who taught him together with his son, (Benjamin's cousin) Aelbert Cuyp. Houbraken felt Aelbert had neater brush strokes and Benjamin showed the rough approach of his teacher.

However according to the Rijksbureau voor Kunsthistorische Documentatie (RKD), Houbraken was mistaken about the family; where in actuality Benjamin and Jacob were both born in Dordrecht as the sons of a glasspainter from Venlo named Gerrit Gerritsz. Cuyp. Benjamin learned to paint from his older half-brother, Jacob Cuyp. He was therefore the uncle, not the cousin, of the much more famous Aelbert Cuyp. He is known for allegorical pieces, genre works, beach scenes, military scenes, and landscapes. He influenced Barent van Kalraet, and was followed by Maerten Fransz van der Hulst. While his Baroque painting styles seems to have been influenced by Rembrandt’s dramatic use of chiaroscuro.

== Works ==
- Joseph interpreting the dreams of the baker and the butler, Rijksmuseum, Amsterdam
- The Entombment, Rijksmuseum, Amsterdam
- Interior of a peasant cottage, Rijksmuseum, Amsterdam
- Saul and the Witch of Endor evoking the ghost of Samuel, Charles de Bruyeres Museum, Remiremont, France

== Gallery ==
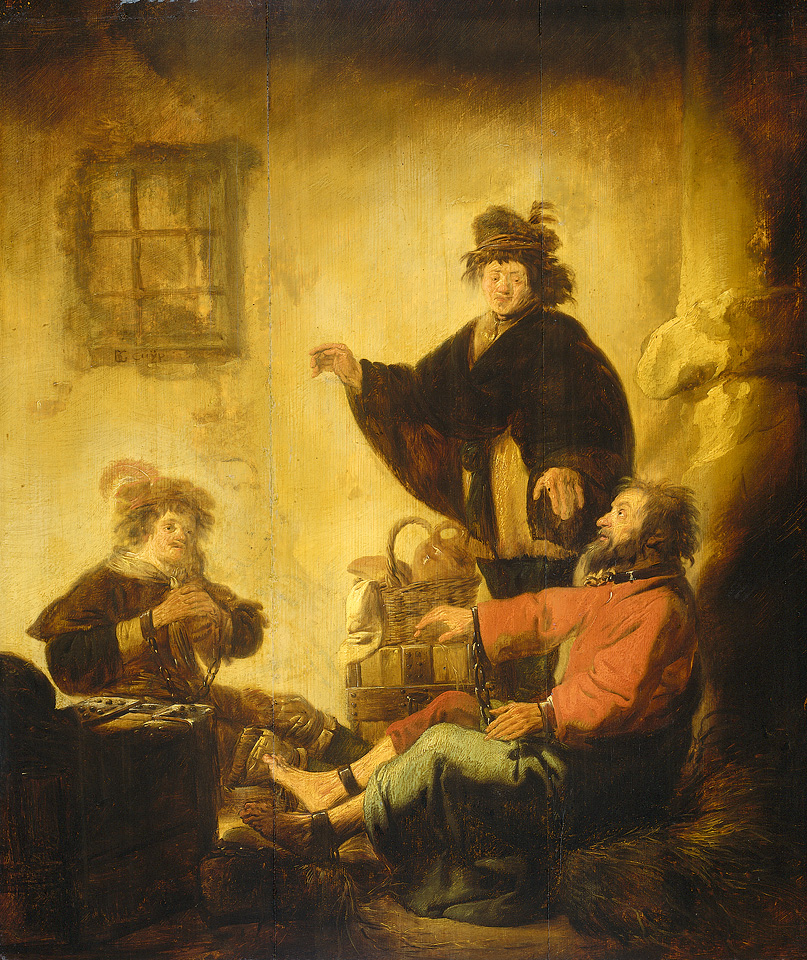
Interpreting Dreams

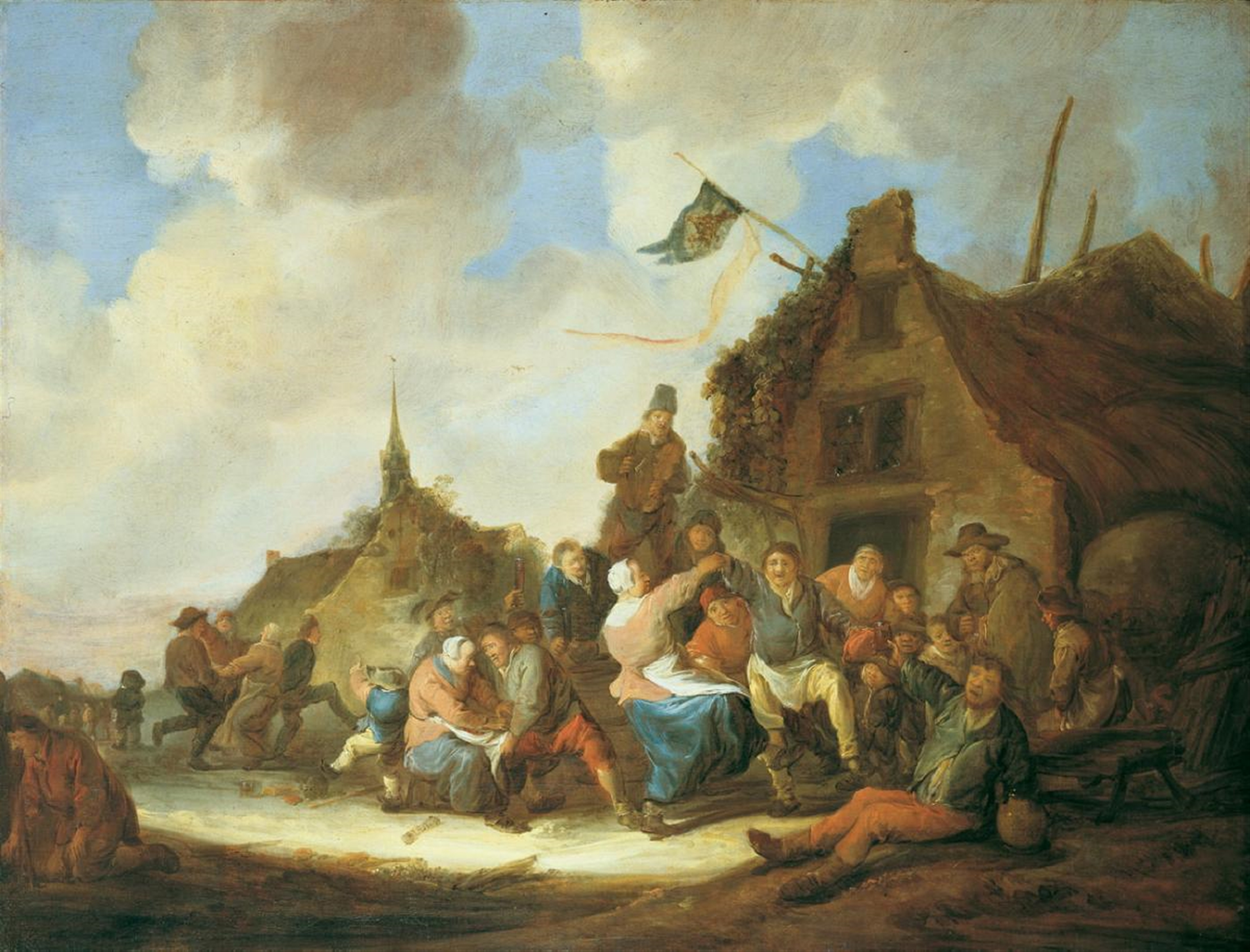
Peasants Dancing and Drinking Outside an Inn

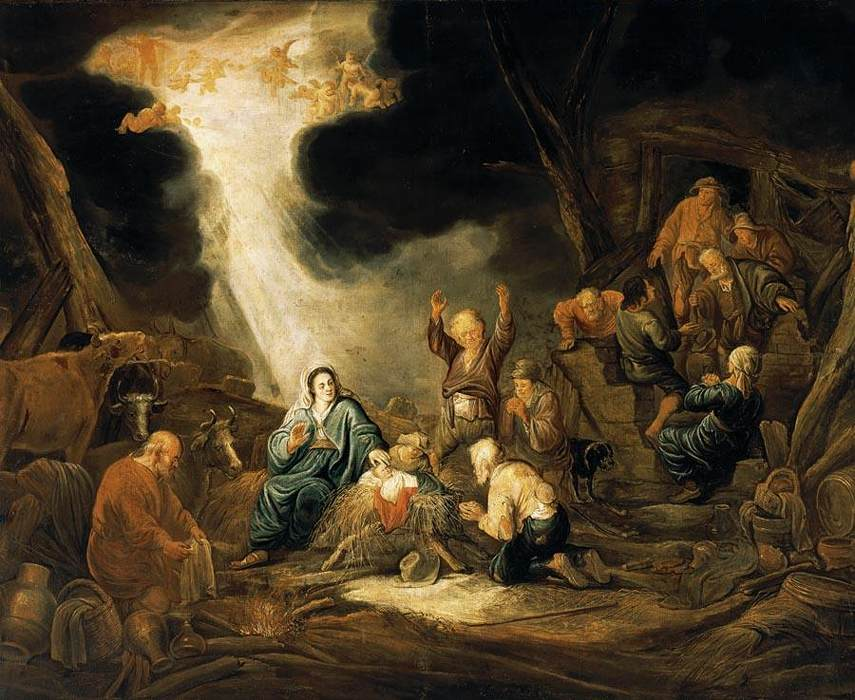
Adoration of the Shepherds

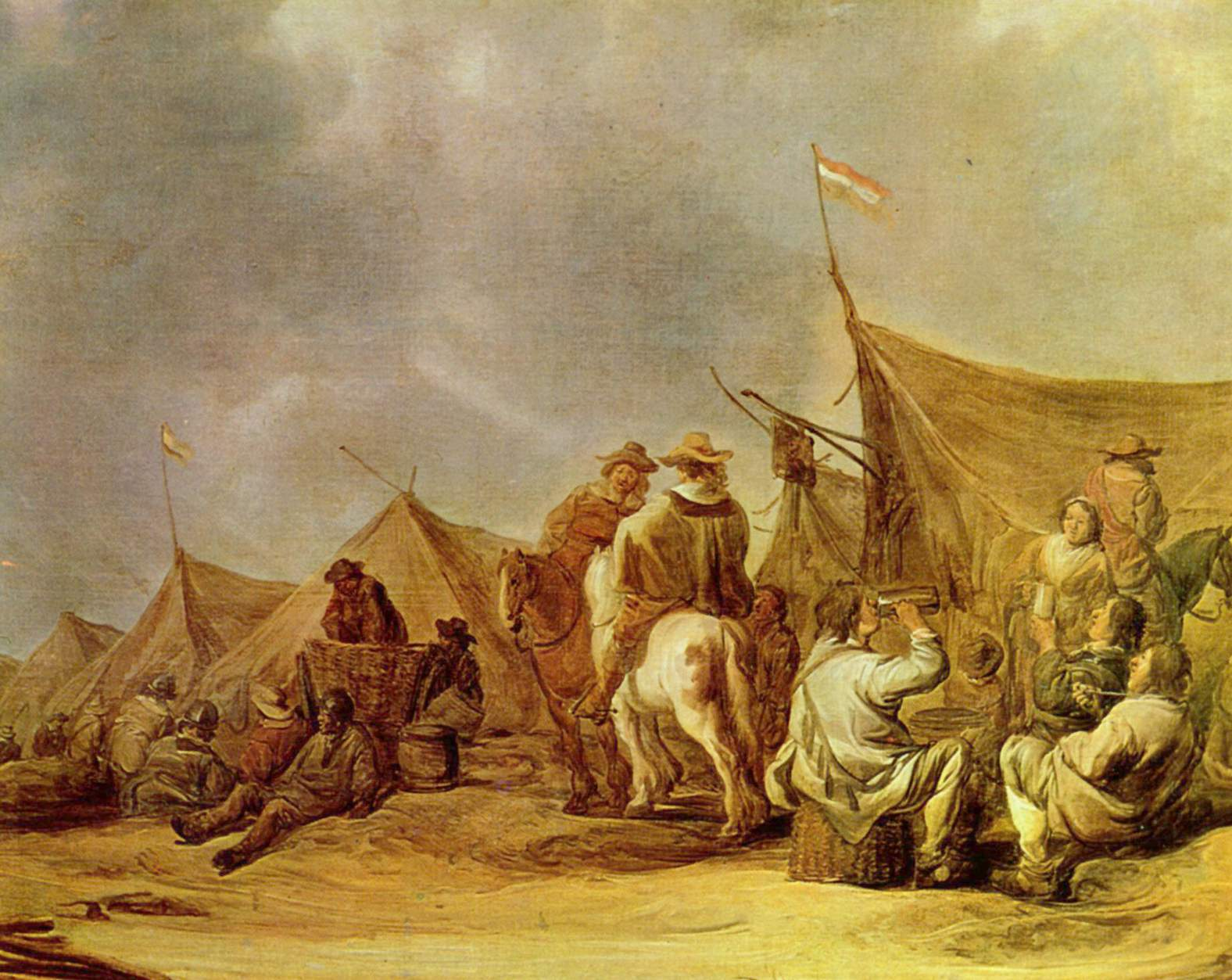
Moment of Rest in the Camp

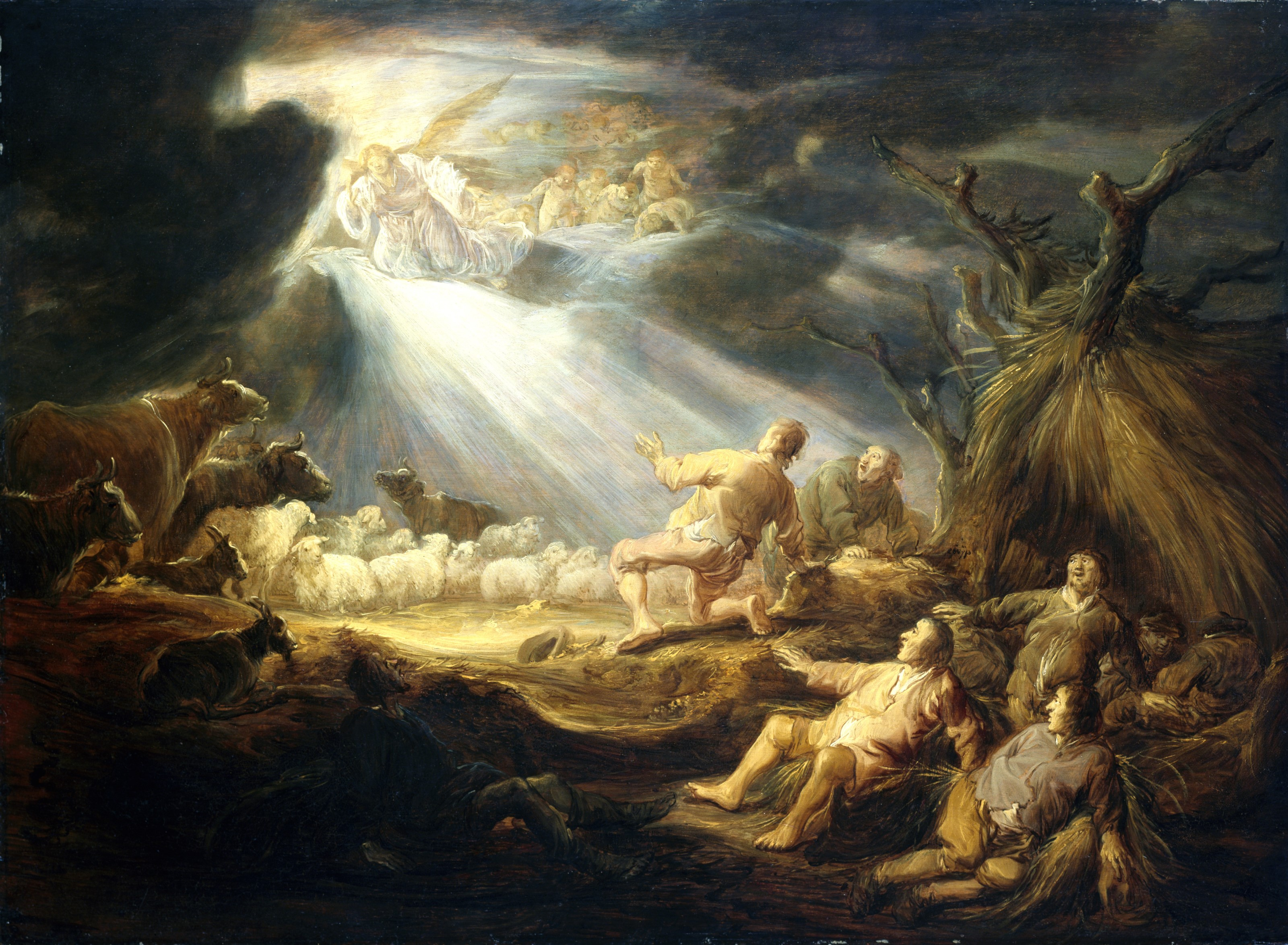
The Annunciation to the Shepherds
