= Aelbert Cuyp =

Dutch landscape painter (1620–1691)

Aelbert Jacobszoon Cuyp
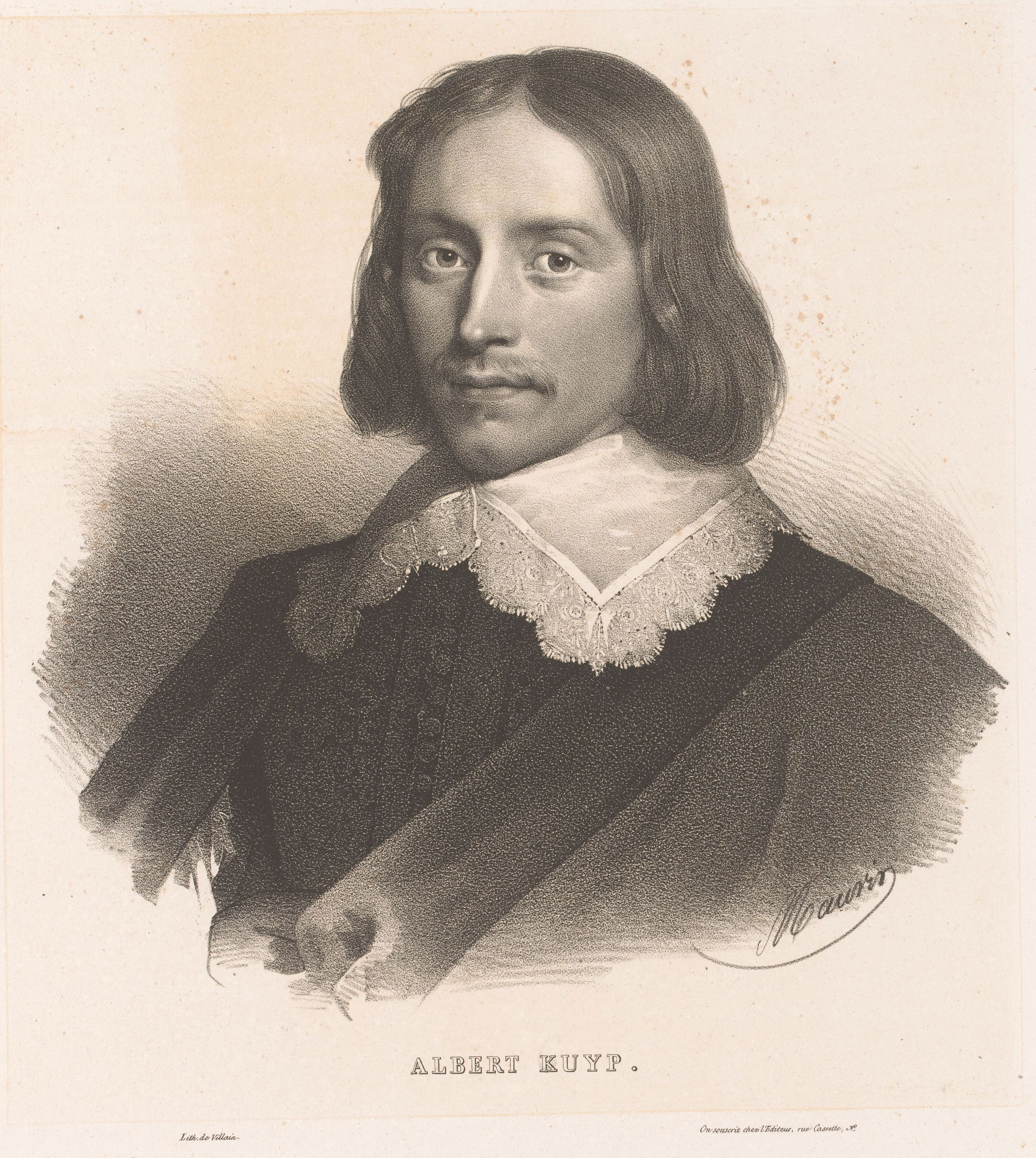
- 19th century lithograph of the artist
- Born: 20 October 1620; Dordrecht, Dutch Republic
- Died: 15 November 1691 (aged 71); Dordrecht, Dutch Republic
- Known for: landscape painting
- Notable work: Starting for the Hunt; River Landscape with Riders; The Maas at Dordrecht; The Valkhof at Nijmegen
- Movement: Dutch Golden Age
- Family: Jacob Cuyp (father); Gerrit Cuyp (grandfather); Benjamin Cuyp (uncle)

Aelbert Jacobszoon Cuyp or Cuijp (Dutch pronunciation: [ˈɑlbər ˈtɕaːkɔpsoːŋ ˈkœyp]; (Note: In isolation, Aelbert and Jacobszoon are pronounced [ˈɑlbərt] and [ˈjaːkɔpsoːn], respectively.) 20 October 1620 – 15 November 1691) was one of the leading Dutch Golden Age painters, producing mainly landscapes. The most famous of a family of painters, the pupil of his father, Jacob Gerritszoon Cuyp (1594–1651/52), he is especially known for his large views of Dutch riverside scenes in a golden early morning or late afternoon light. He was born and died in Dordrecht.

== Biography ==
Known as the Dutch equivalent of Claude Lorrain, he inherited a considerable fortune. His family were all artists, with his uncle Benjamin and grandfather Gerrit being stained glass cartoon designers. Jacob Gerritszoon Cuyp, his father, was a portraitist. Cuyp's father was his first teacher and they collaborated on many paintings throughout his lifetime.

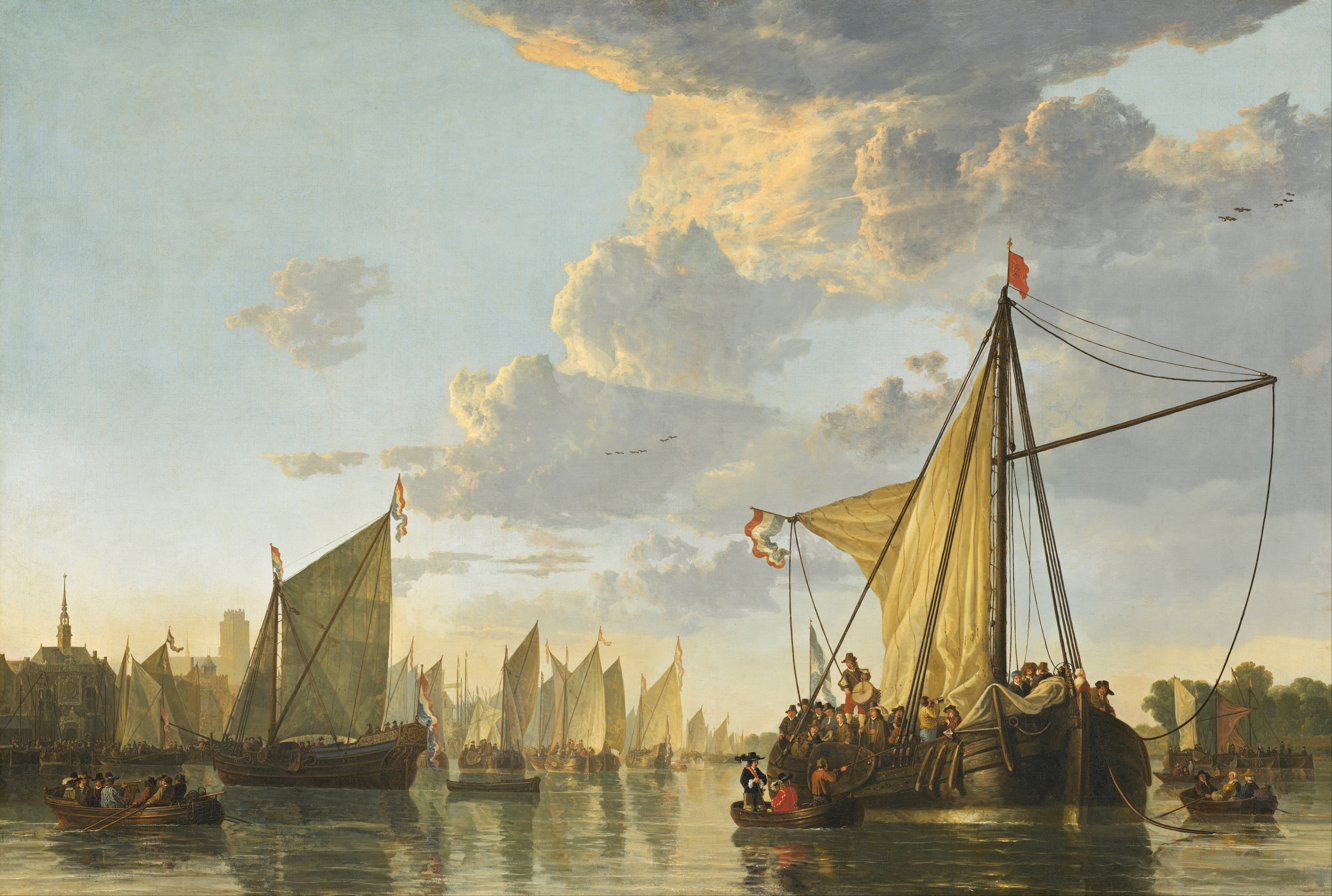
The Maas at Dordrecht, c. 1650, showing the Maas River in front of Cuyp's hometown of Dordrecht, National Gallery of Art

Little is known about Aelbert Cuyp's life. Even Arnold Houbraken, a noted historian of Dutch Golden Age paintings and the sole authority on Cuyp for the hundred years following his death, paints a very thin biographical picture.

His period of activity as a painter is traditionally limited to the two decades between 1639 and 1660, fitting within the generally accepted limits of the Dutch Golden Age's most significant period, 1640–1665. He is known to have been married to Cornelia Bosman in 1658, a date coinciding so directly with the end of his productivity as a painter that it has been accepted that his marriage played a role in the end of his artistic career.

The year after his marriage, Cuyp became the deacon of the reformed church. Houbraken recalled that Cuyp was a devout Calvinist and the fact that when he died, there were no paintings of other artists found in his home.

== Style ==
The development of Cuyp, who was trained as a landscape painter, may be roughly sketched in three phases based on the painters who most influenced him during that time and the subsequent artistic characteristics that are apparent in his paintings. Generally, Cuyp learned tone from the exceptionally prolific Jan van Goyen, light from Jan Both and form from his father, Jacob Gerritsz Cuyp.

Cuyp's "van Goyen phase" can be placed approximately in the early 1640s. Cuyp probably first encountered a painting by van Goyen in 1640 when van Goyen was, as Stephen Reiss points, out "at the height of [his] powers". This is noticeable in the comparison between two of Cuyp's landscape paintings inscribed 1639 where no properly formed style is apparent and the landscape backgrounds he painted two years later for two of his father's group portraits that are distinctly van Goyenesque. Cuyp took from van Goyen the straw yellow and light brown tones that are so apparent in his Dunes (1629) and the broken brush technique also very noticeable in that same work. This technique, a precursor to impressionism, is noted for the short brush strokes where the colors are not necessarily blended smoothly. In Cuyp's River Scene, Two Men Conversing (1641) both of these van Goyen-influenced stylistic elements are noticeable.

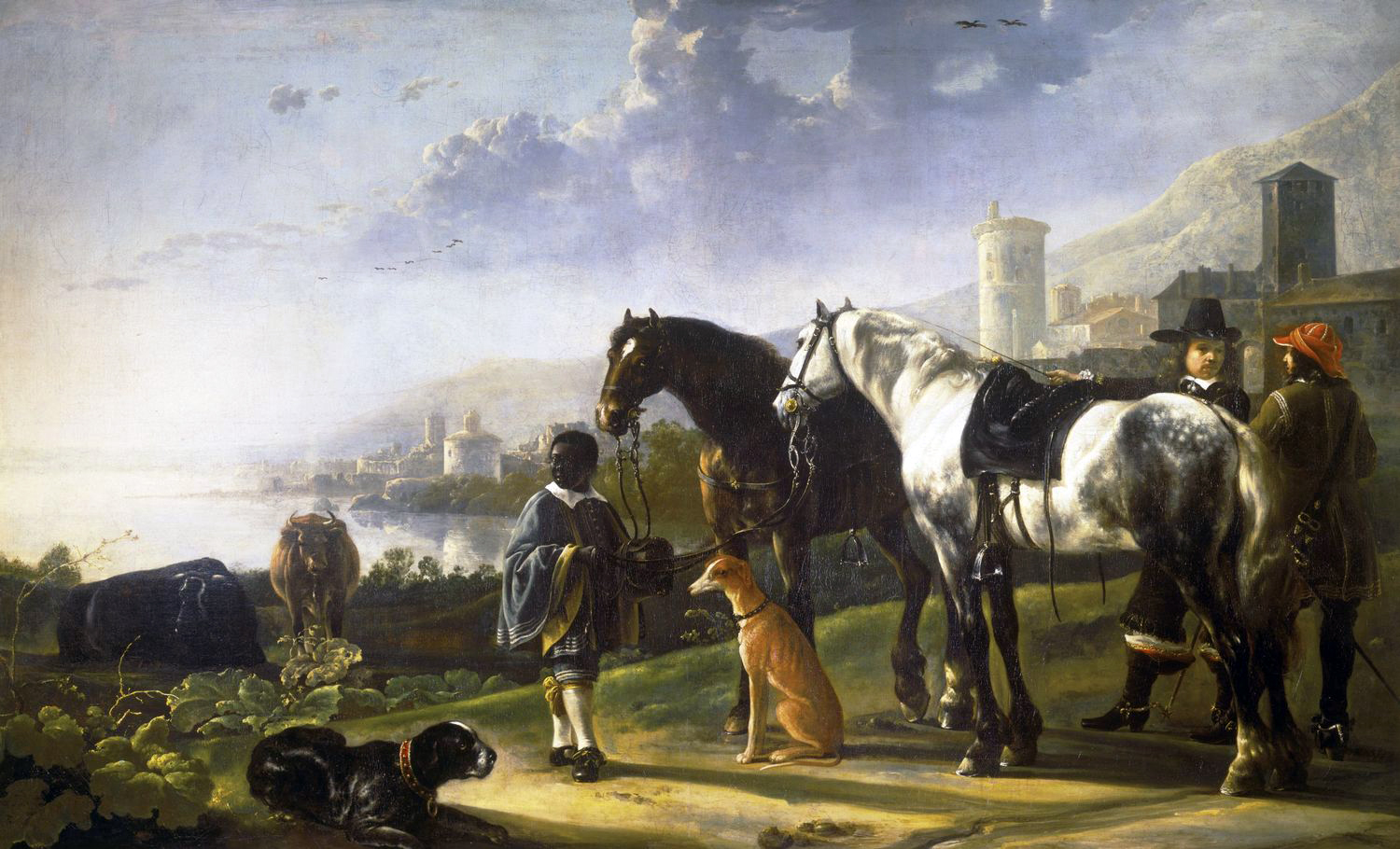
A Page with Two Horses (formerly The Negro Page), circa 1652, Royal Collection

The next phase in the development of Cuyp's increasingly amalgamated style is due to the influence of Jan Both. In the mid-1640s Both, a native and resident of Utrecht, had just returned to his hometown from a trip to Rome. It is around this same time that Cuyp's style changed fundamentally. In Rome, Both had developed a new style of composition due, at least in part, to his interaction with Claude Lorrain. This new style was focused on changing the direction of light in the painting. Instead of the light being placed at right angles in relation to the line of vision, Both started moving it to a diagonal position from the back of the picture.

In this new form of lighting, the artist (and viewer of the painting) faced the sun more or less contre-jour. Both, and subsequently Cuyp, used the advantages of this new lighting style to alter the sense of depth and luminosity possible in a painting. To make notice of these new capabilities, much use was made of elongated shadows. Cuyp was one of the first Dutch painters to appreciate this new leap forward in style and while his own Both-inspired phase was quite short (limited to the mid-1640s) he did, more than any other contemporary Dutch artist, maximize the full chromatic scale for sunsets and sunrises.

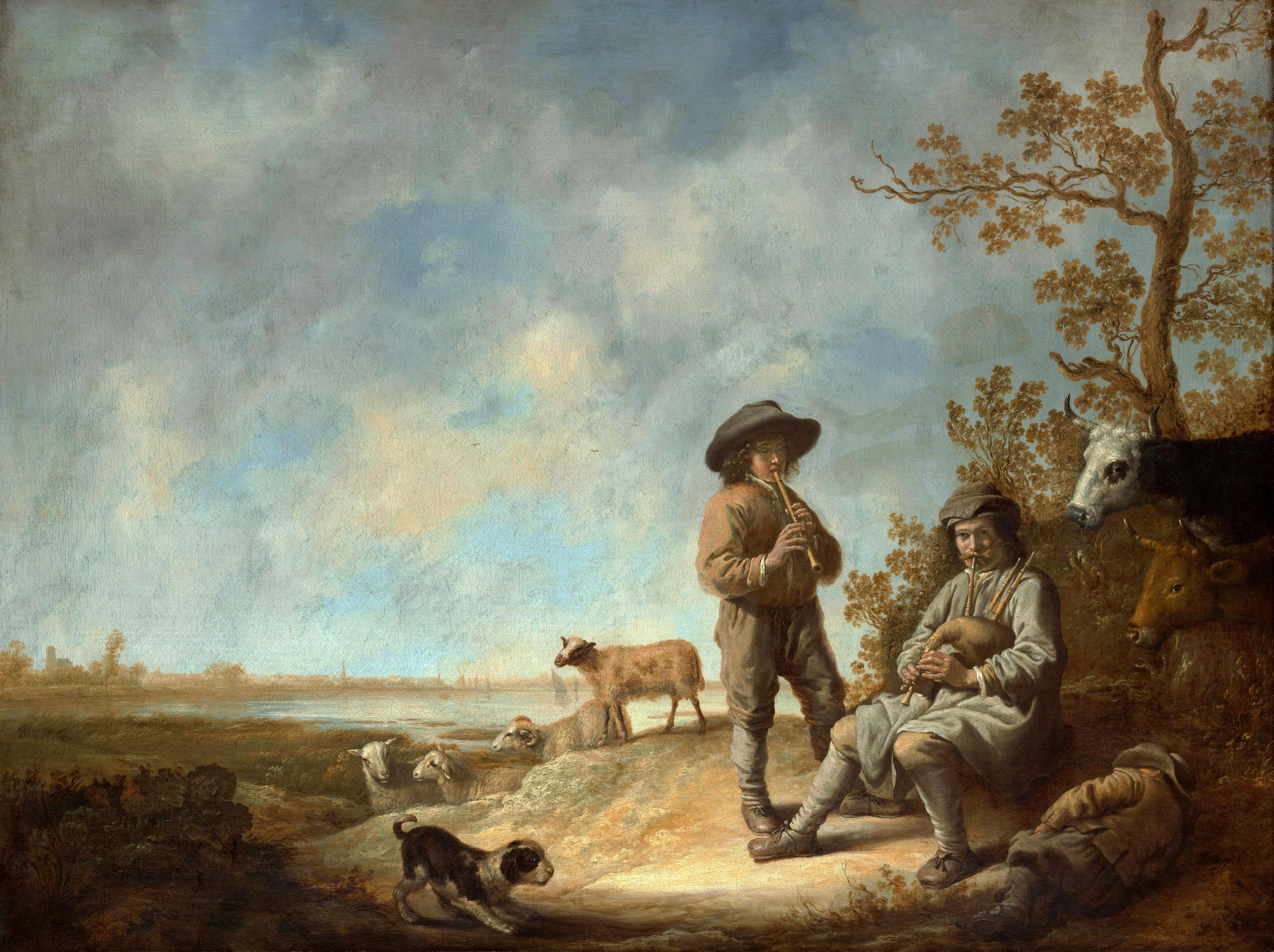
Piping Shepherds, Metropolitan Museum of Art

Cuyp's third stylistic phase (which occurred throughout his career) is based on the influence of his father. While it is assumed that the younger Cuyp did work with his father initially to develop rudimentary talents, Aelbert became more focused on landscape paintings while Jacob was a portrait painter by profession. As has been mentioned and as will be explained in depth below, there are pieces where Aelbert provided the landscape background for his father's portraits. What is meant by stating that Aelbert learned from his father is that his eventual transition from a specifically landscape painter to the involvement of foreground figures is attributed to his interaction with his father Jacob. The evidence for Aelbert's evolution to foreground figure painter is in the production of some paintings from 1645 to 1650 featuring foreground animals that do not fit with Jacob's style. Adding to the confusion regarding Aelbert's stylistic development and the problem of attribution is of course the fact that Jacob's style was not stagnant either. Their converging styles make it difficult to exactly understand the influences each had on the other, although it is clear enough to say that Aelbert started representing large scale forms (something he had not done previously) and placing animals as the focus of his paintings (something that was specific to him).

== Paintings ==
Sunlight in his paintings rakes across the panel, accentuating small bits of detail in the golden light. In large, atmospheric panoramas of the countryside, the highlights on a blade of meadow grass, the mane of a tranquil horse, the horn of a dairy cow reclining by a stream, or the tip of a peasant's hat are all caught in a bath of yellow ocher light. The richly varnished medium refracts the rays of light like a jewel as it dissolves into numerous glazed layers. Cuyp's landscapes were based on reality and on his own invention of what an enchanting landscape should be.

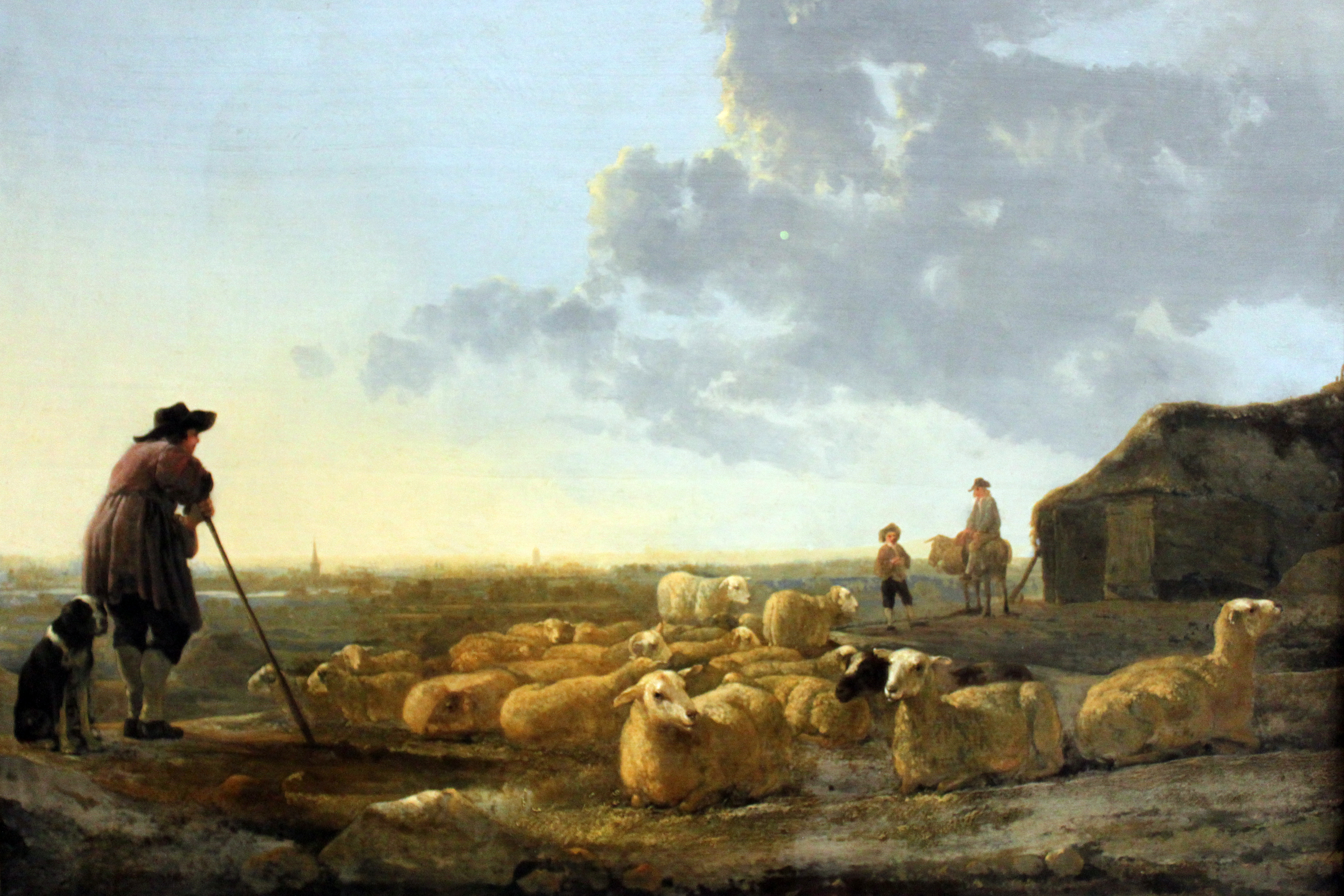
Herd of Sheep at Pasture, 1650, Städelsches Kunstinstitut

Cuyp's drawings reveal him to be a draftsman of superior quality. Light-drenched washes of golden brown ink depict a distant view of the city of Dordrecht or Utrecht.

A Cuyp drawing may look like he intended it to be a finished work of art, but it was most likely taken back to the studio and used as a reference for his paintings. Often the same section of a sketch can be found in several different pictures.

Cuyp signed many of his works but rarely dated them, so that a chronology of his career has not been satisfactorily reassembled. A phenomenal number of paintings are ascribed to him, some of which are likely to be by other masters of the golden landscape, such as Abraham Calraet (1642–1722), whose initials A.C. may be mistaken for Cuyp's.

However, not everyone appreciates his work and River Landscape (1660), despite being widely regarded as amongst his best work, has been described as having "chocolate box blandness".

At the Madrid's Thyssen-Bornemisza Museum most likely, the sole Cuyp's painting in Spanish public collections can be seen, a Landscape with a sunset ca. 1655 with animals.

== Misattribution of paintings ==
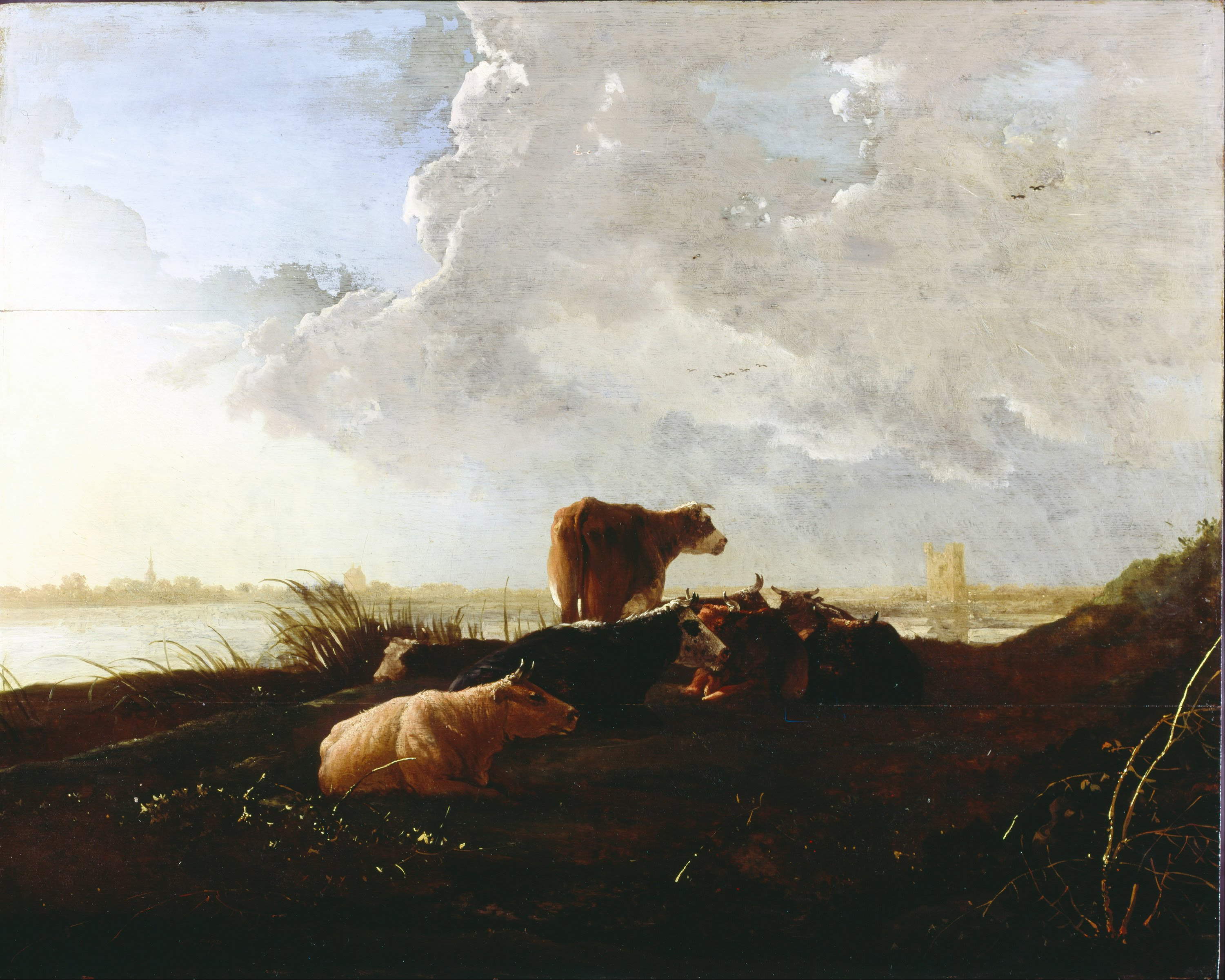
Cattle near a River, painting by an imitator of Cuyp (suspected 18th century).

In addition to the scarcely documented and confirmed biography of Cuyp's life, and even more so than his amalgamated style from his three main influences, there are yet other factors that have led to the misattribution and confusion over Aelbert Cuyp's works for hundreds of years. His highly influenced style which incorporated Italianate lighting from Jan Both, broken brush technique and atonality from Jan van Goyen, and his ever-developing style from his father Jacob Gerritsz Cuyp was studied acutely by his most prominent follower, Abraham van Calraet. Calraet mimicked Cuyp's style, incorporating the same aspects, and produced similar landscapes to that of the latter. This made it quite difficult to tell whose paintings were whose. Adding to the confusion is the similar initials between the two and the inconsistent signing of paintings which were produced by Cuyp's studio.

Although Aelbert Cuyp signed many of his paintings with a script "A. Cuyp" insignia, many paintings were left unsigned (not to mention undated) after being painted, and so a similar signature was added later on, presumably by collectors who inherited or discovered the works. Furthermore, many possible Cuyp paintings were not signed but rather initialed "A. C." referring to his name. However, Abraham van Calraet could also have used the same initials to denote a painting. Although this is unlikely (as Calraet would likely have signed his paintings "A. v.C."), this brings up the question of how paintings were signed to show ownership. Most original Cuyp paintings were signed by him, and in the script manner in which his name was inscribed. This would denote that the painting was done almost entirely by him. Conversely, paintings which came out of his workshop that were not necessarily physically worked on by Cuyp but merely overseen by him technically, were marked with A.C. to show that it was his instruction which saw the paintings' completion. Cuyp's pupils and assistants often worked on paintings in his studio, and so most of the work of a painting could be done without Cuyp ever touching the canvas, but merely approving its finality. Hence, the initialed inscription rather than a signature.

Common among the mislabeled works are all of the reasons identified for misattributing Cuyp's works: the lack of biography and chronology of his works made it difficult to discern when paintings were created (making it difficult to pinpoint an artist); contentious signatures added to historians' confusion as to who actually painted the works; and the collaborations and influences by different painters makes it hard to justify that a painting is genuinely that of Aelbert Cuyp; and finally, accurate identification is made extremely difficult by the fact that this same style was copied (rather accurately) by his predecessor. As it turns out, even the historians and expert researchers have been fooled and forced to reassess their conclusions over "Cuyp's" paintings over the years.

== Later life ==
After he married Cornelia Boschman in 1658, the number of works produced by him declined almost to nothing. This may have been because his wife was a very religious woman and a not very big patron of the arts. It could also be that he became more active in the church under his wife's guidance. He was also active as deacon and elder of the Reformed Church.

== Legacy ==
Though long lacking a modern biography, and with the chronology of his works rather unclear, his style emerged from various influences and makes his works distinctive, although his collaborations with his father and works by his imitators often make attributions uncertain. His follower Abraham van Calraet represents a particular problem, and the signatures on paintings are not to be relied on. The Rijksmuseum has reattributed many works to other painters; Abraham van Calraet does not even appear in a Museum catalogue until 1926, and even then he was not given his own entry.

== Gallery ==
Aelbert Cuyp's paintings

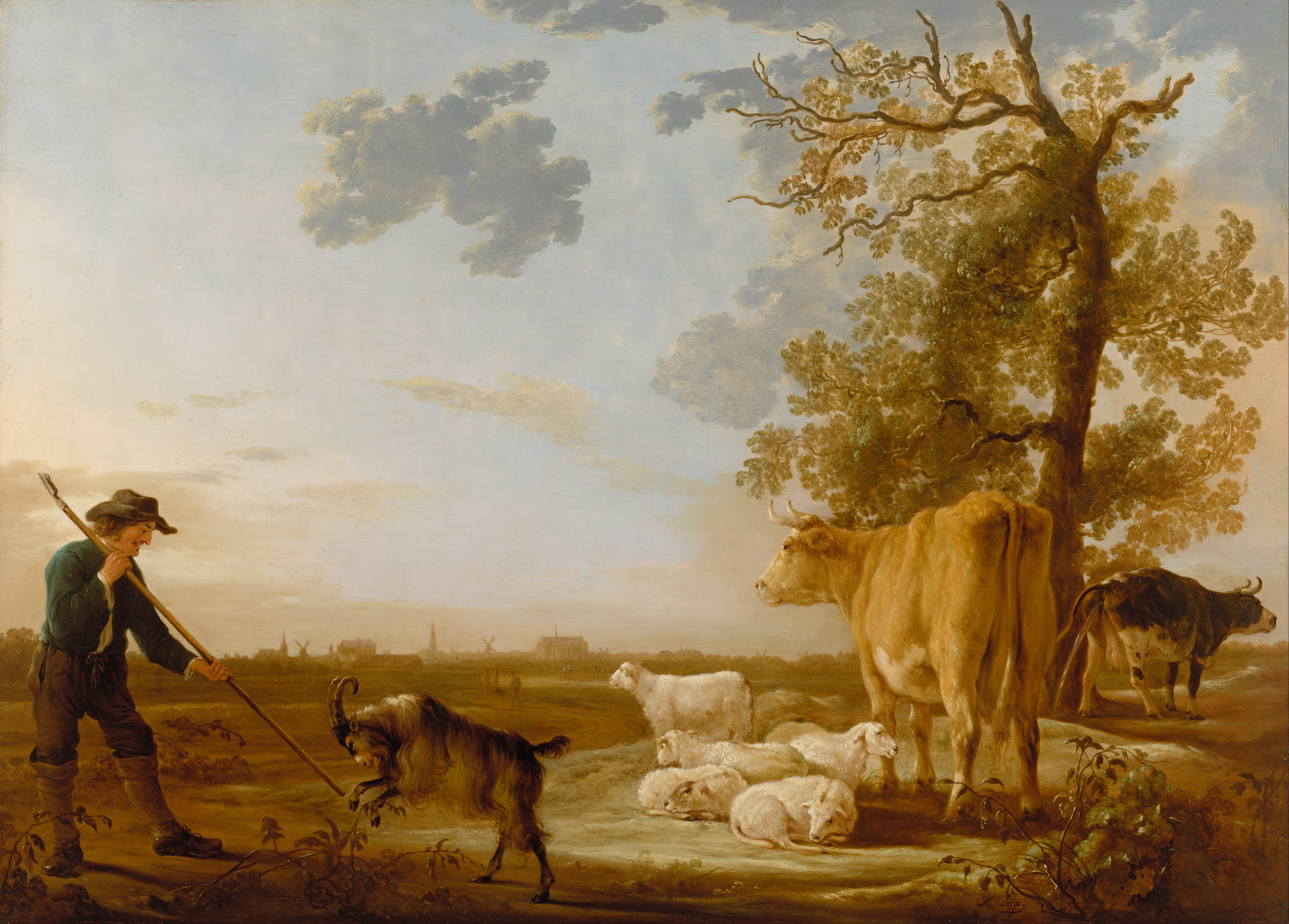
Landscape with cattle
(c. 1639–1649)
National Gallery of Victoria

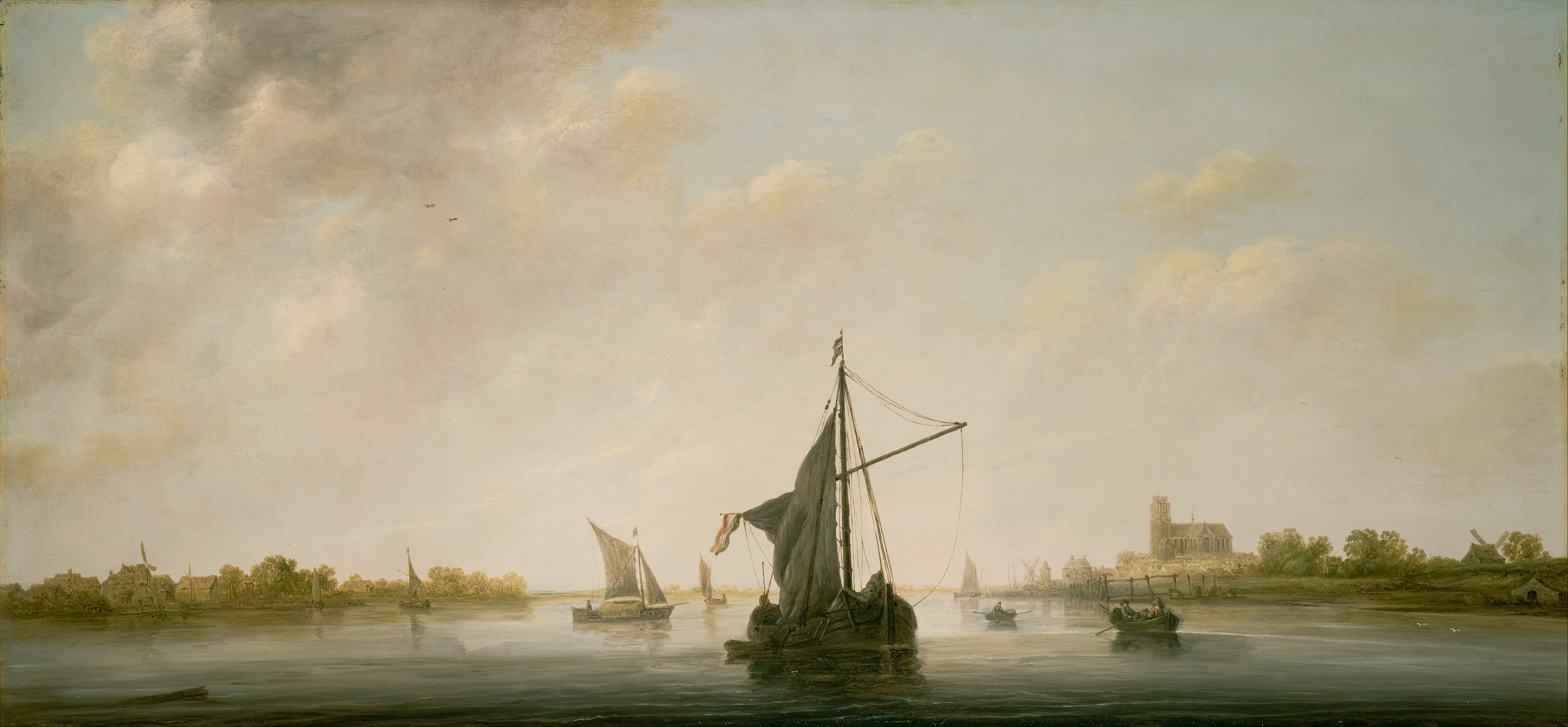
A View of the Maas at Dordrecht
(about 1645–1646)
J. Paul Getty Museum

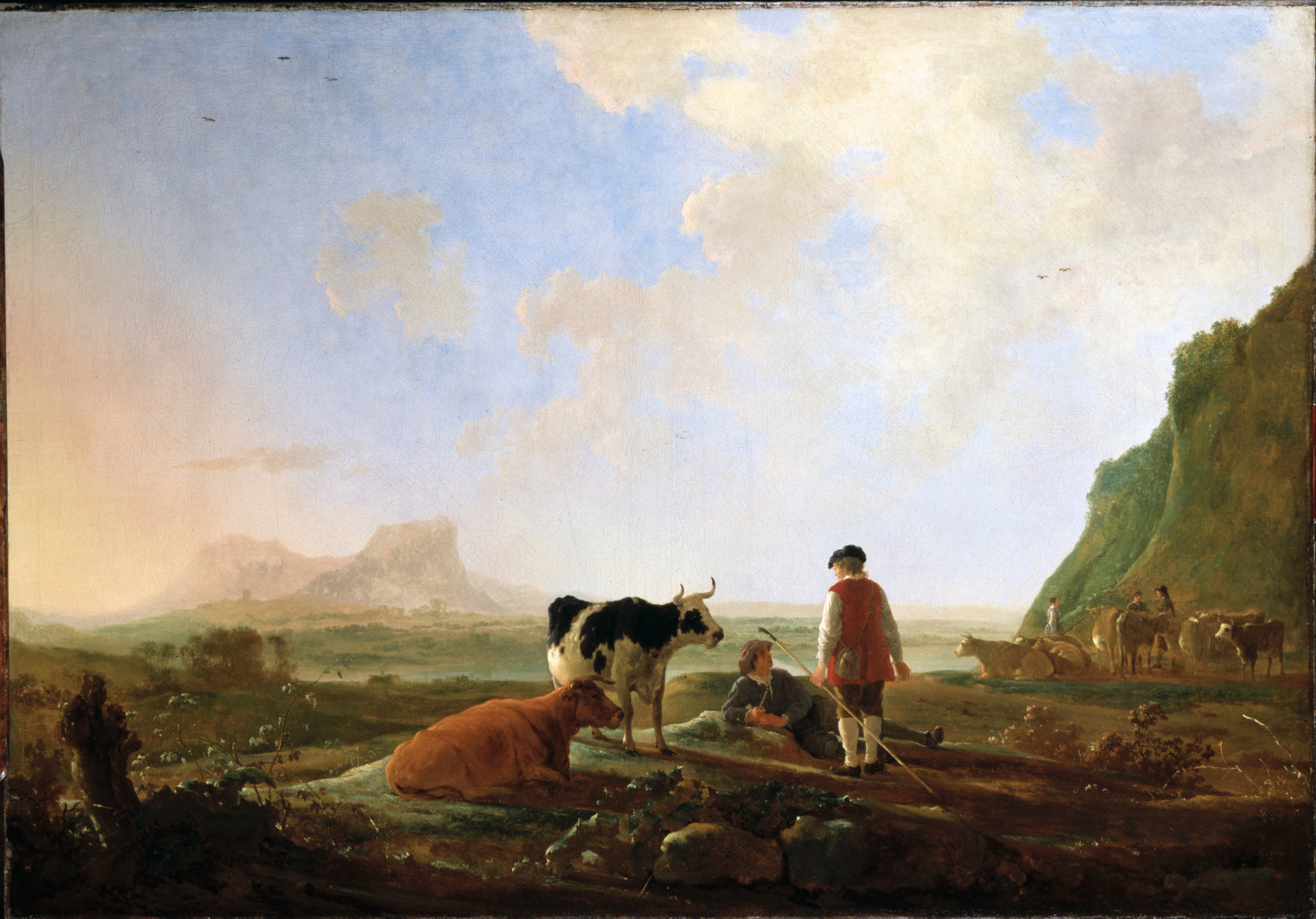
Herdsmen with Cows
(c. 1645)
Dulwich Picture Gallery

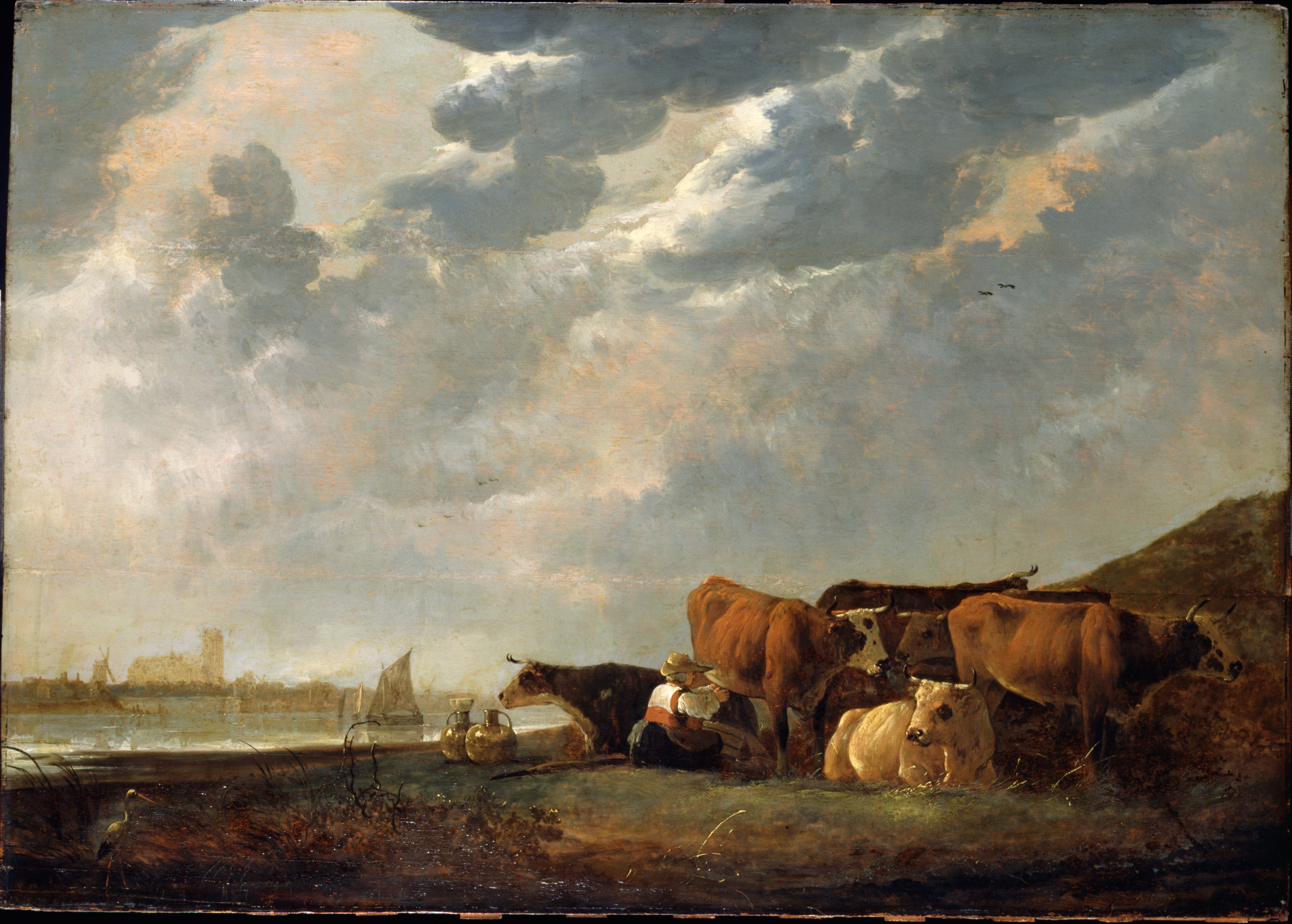
Cattle near the Maas, with Dordrecht in the distance

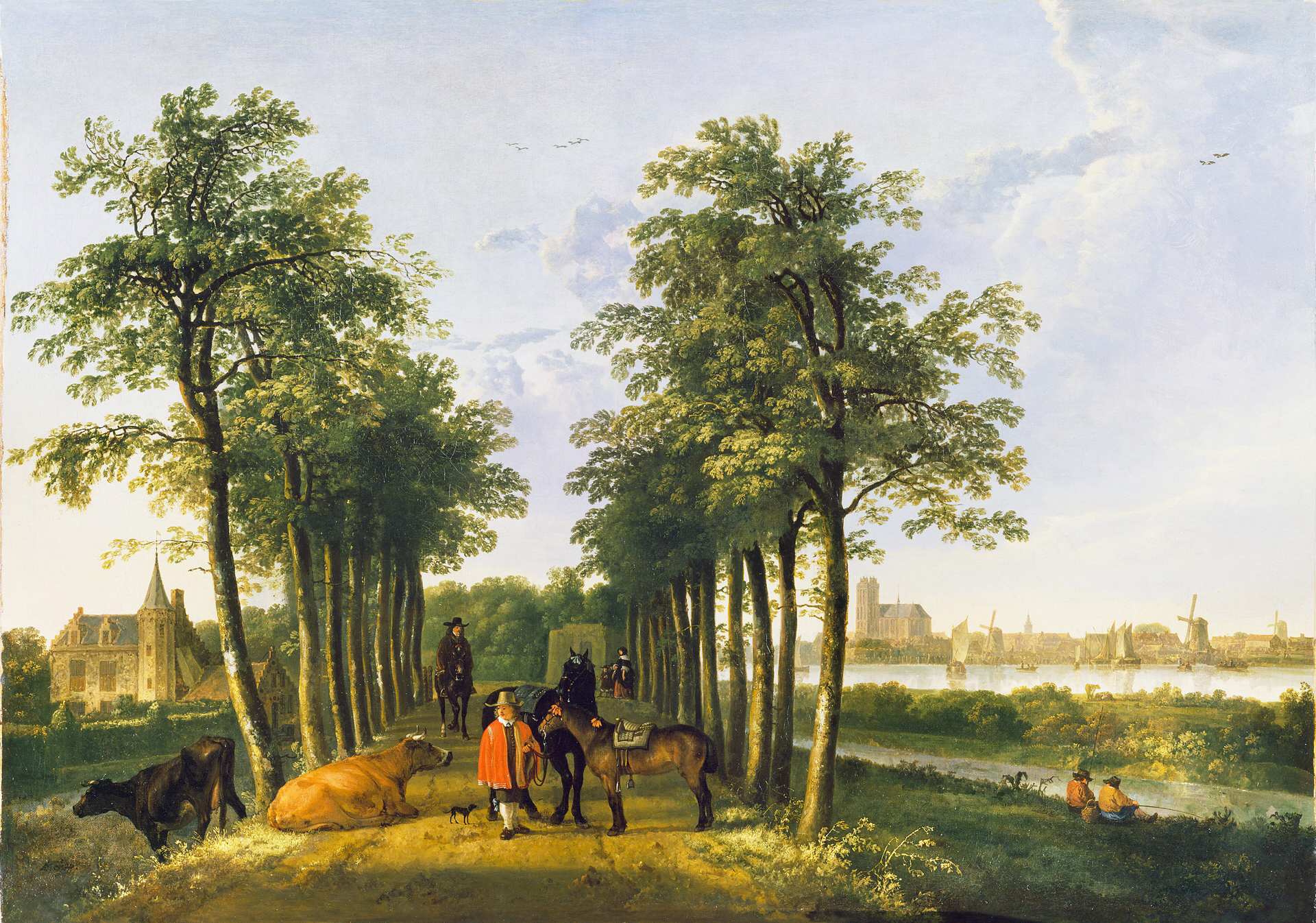
Avenue at Meerdervoort

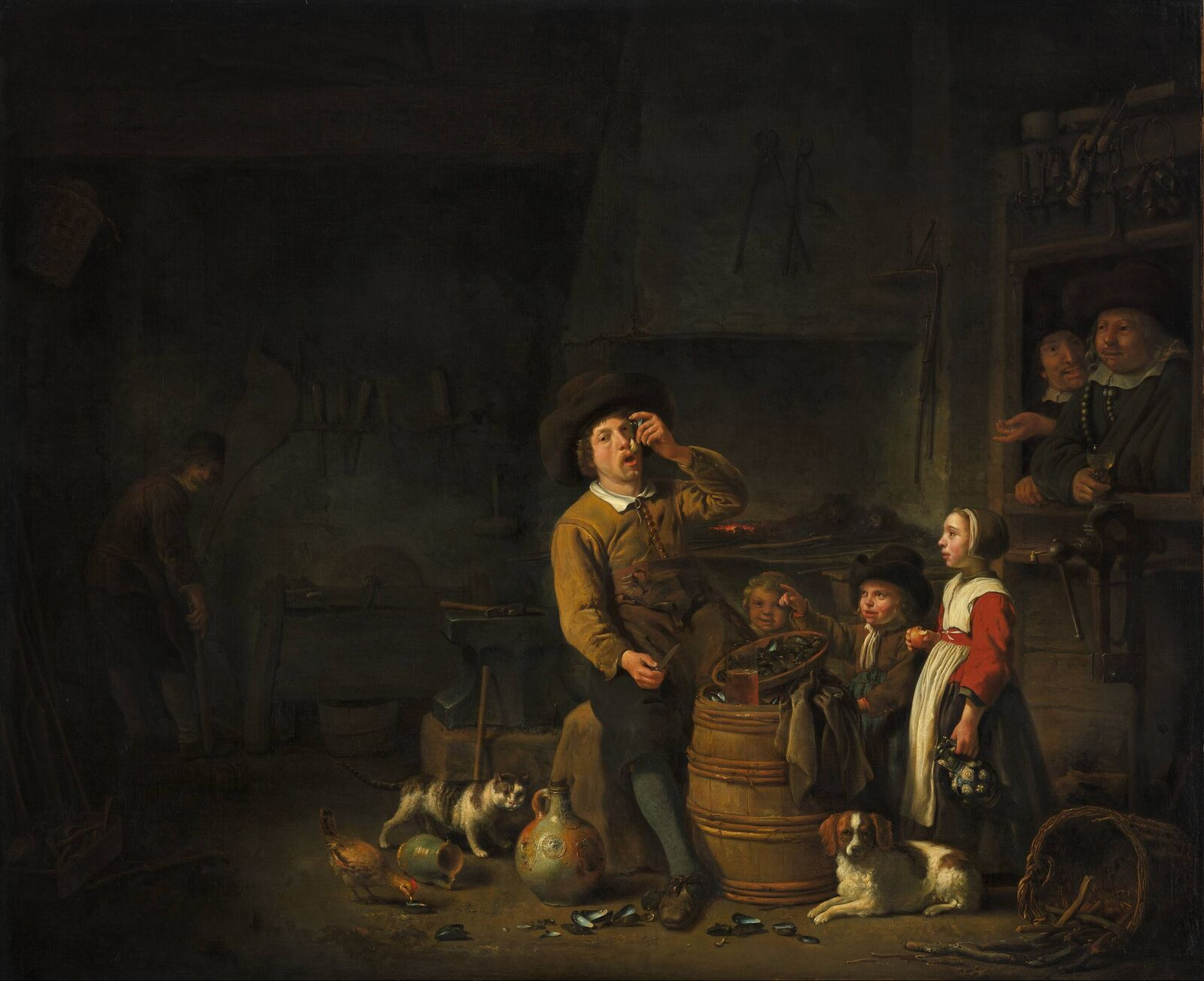
The Mussel Eater, c. 1650, Museum Boijmans Van Beuningen

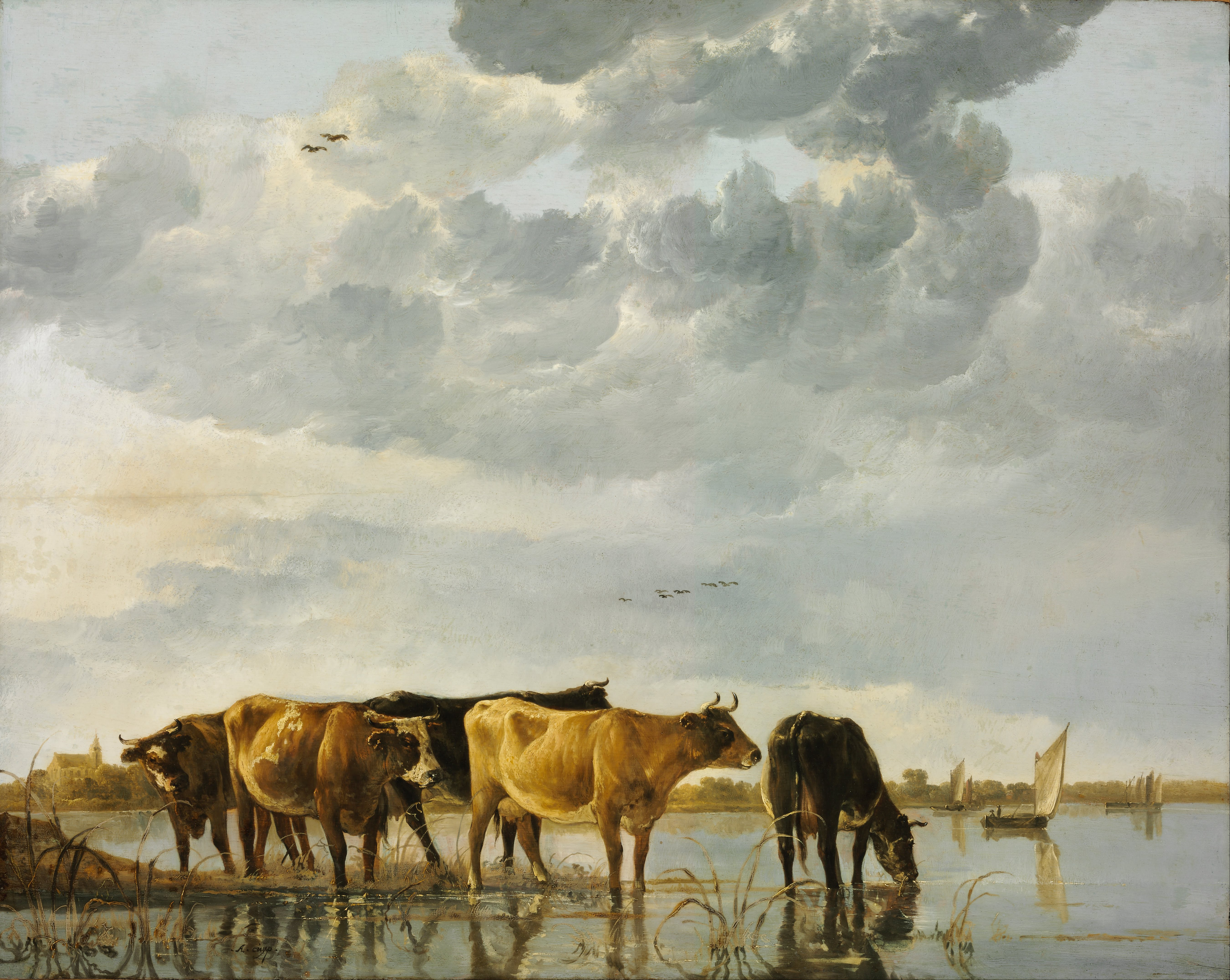
Cows in a River, c. 1654

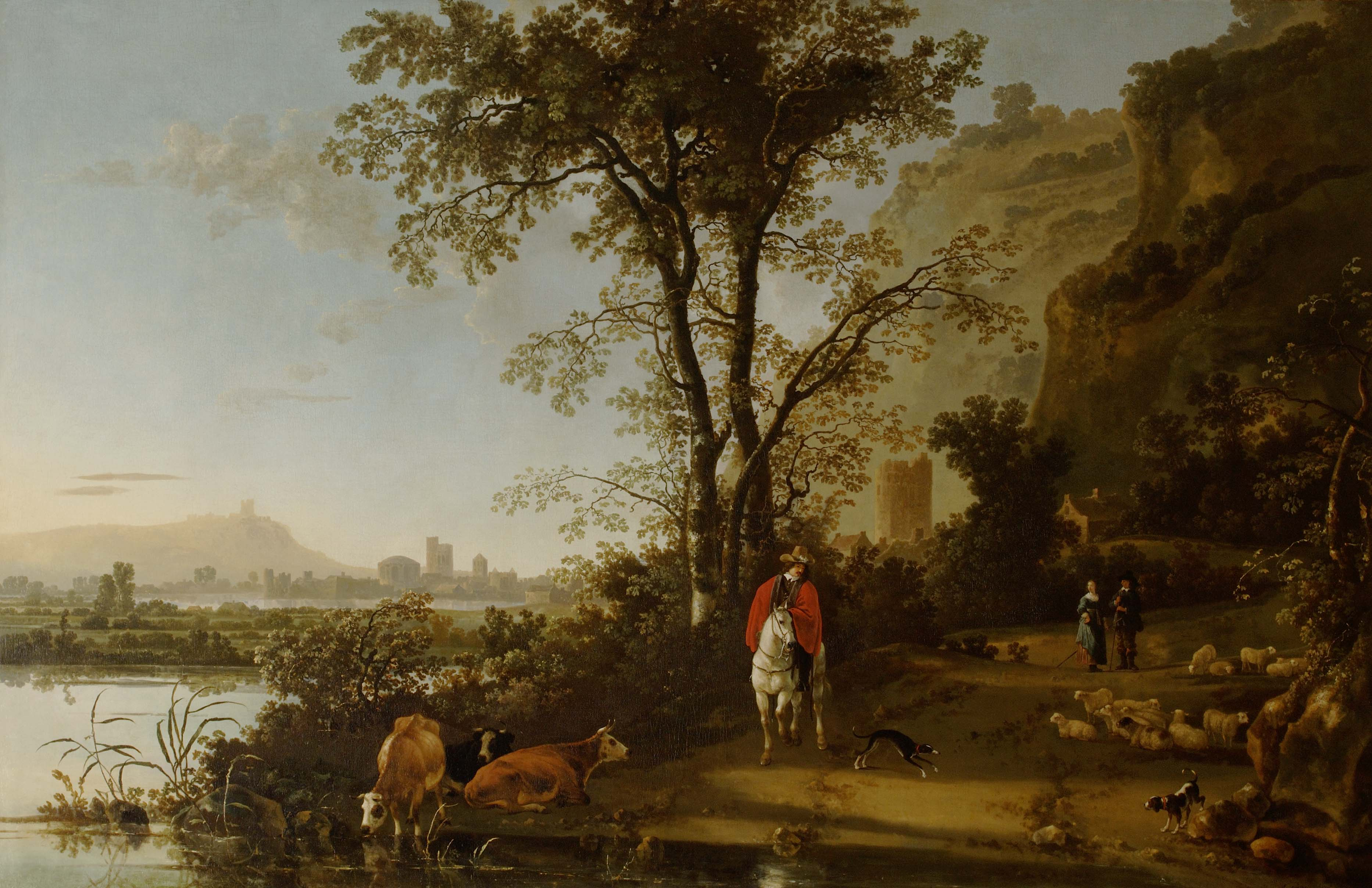
Landscape with a Horseman, Figures, and Cattle, c. 1655, Waddesdon Manor

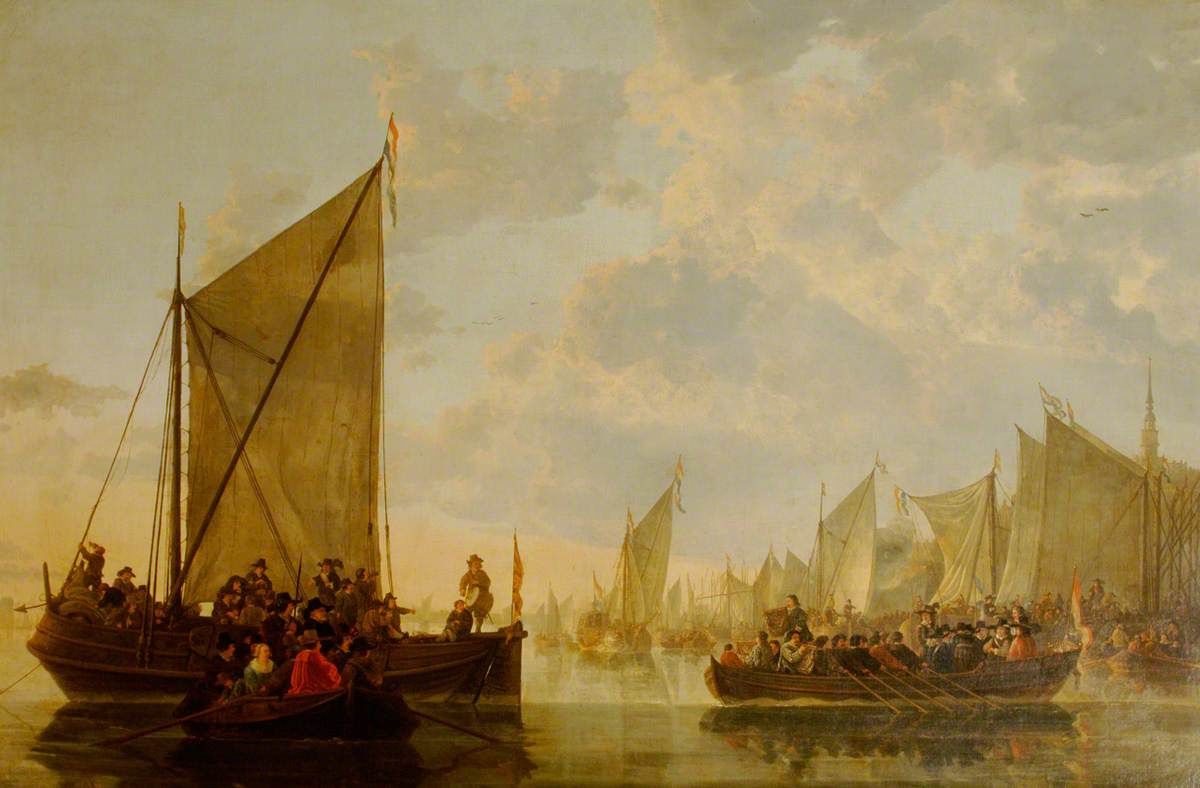
A Landing Party on the Maas at Dordrecht, 1655–1660, Waddesdon Manor. The other canvas that appears to show an event in the end stages of the Eighty Years' War is now in the National Gallery of Art, Washington.

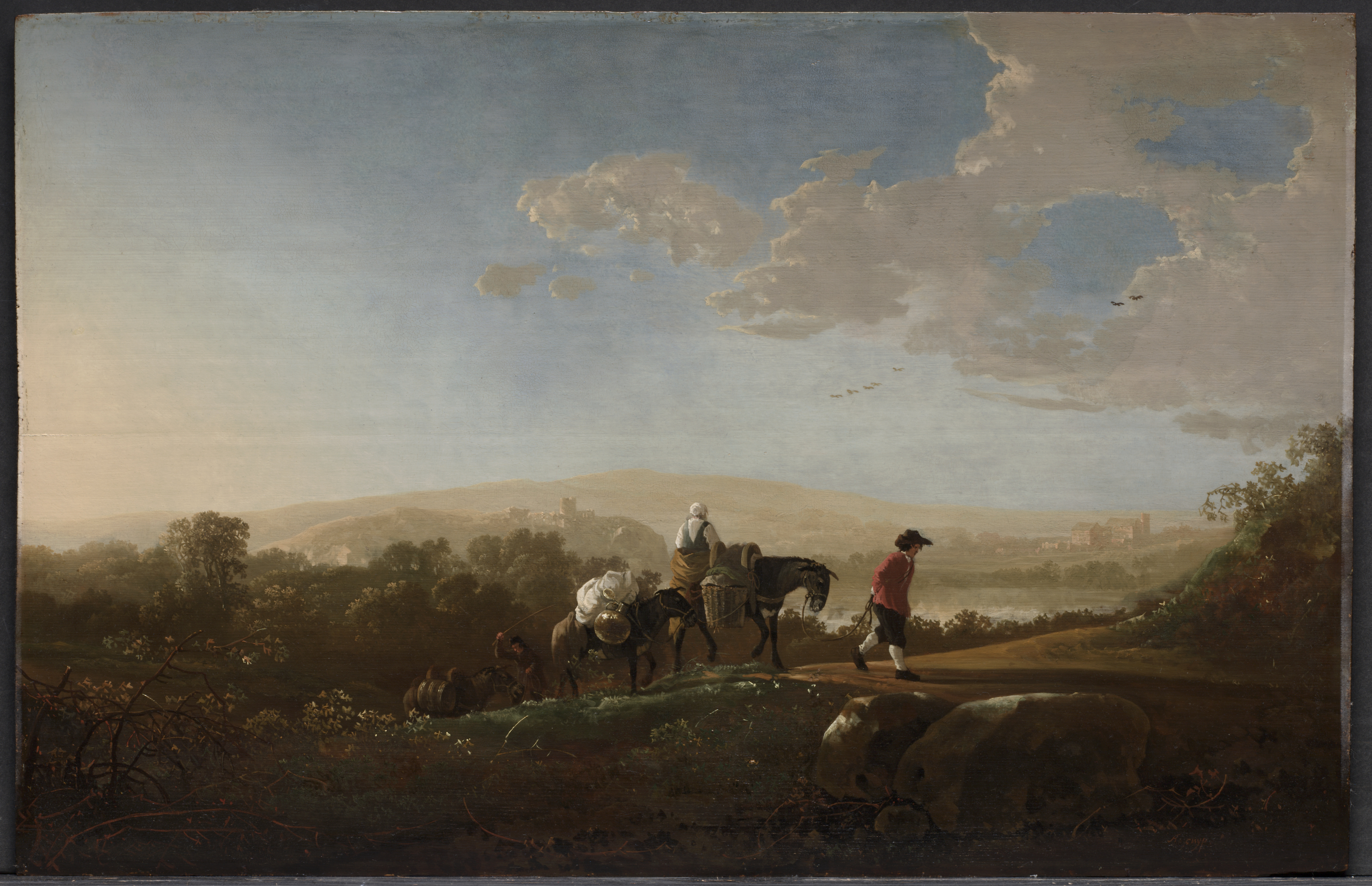
Travelers in Hilly Countryside (c. 1650), Cleveland Museum of Art

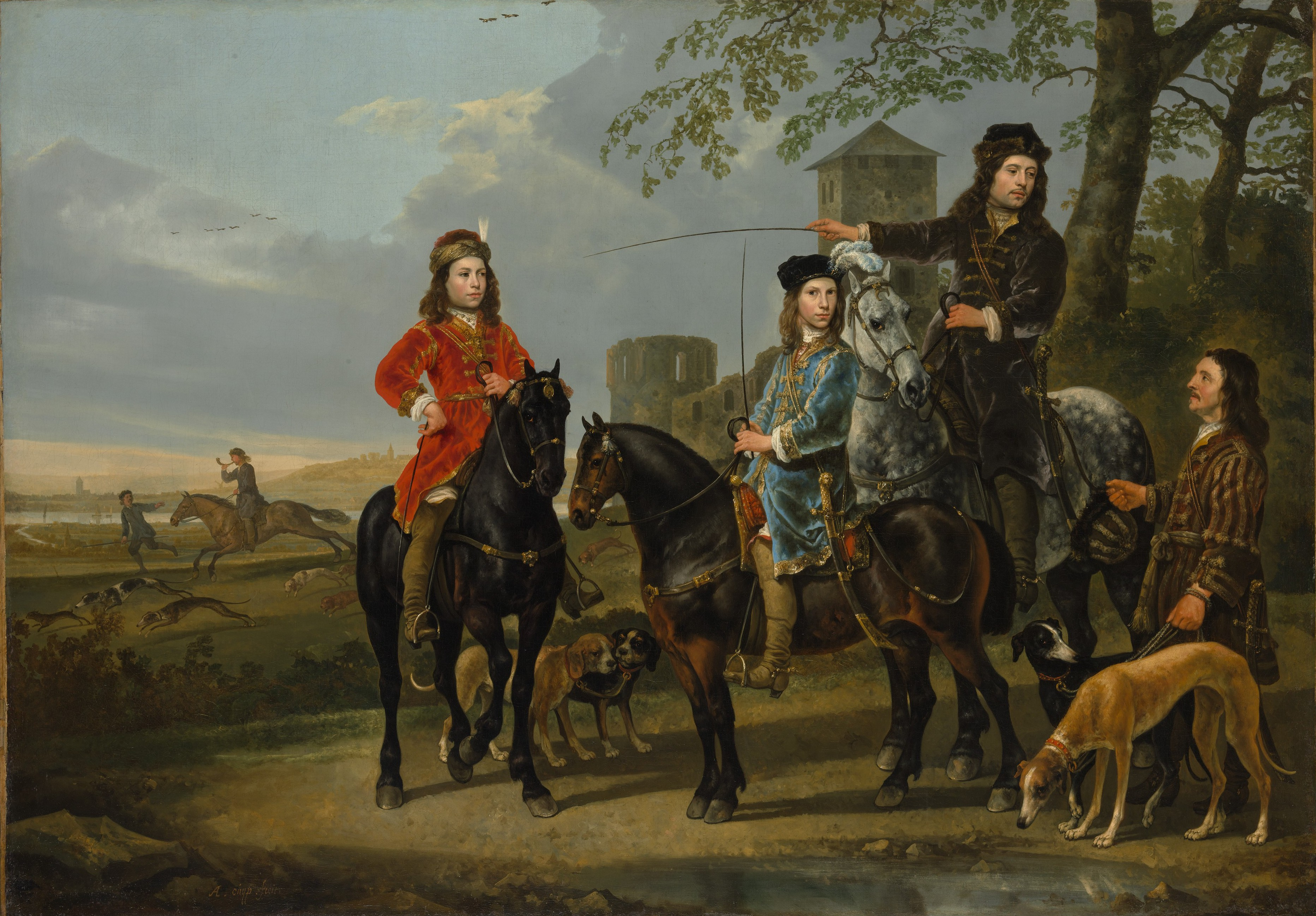
Equestrian Portrait of Cornelis and Michiel Pompe van Meerdervoort with Their Tutor and Coachman (before 1653), Metropolitan Museum of Art
