= Walnut ink =

Type of Ink

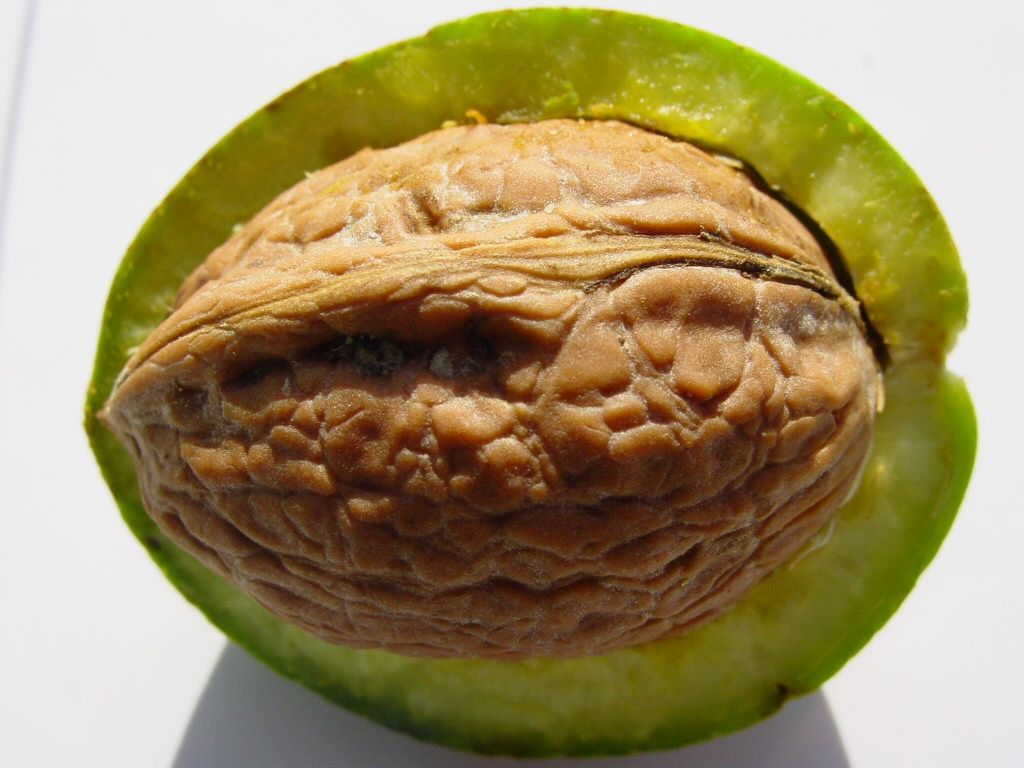
Cross-section of the husk from which walnut ink is made

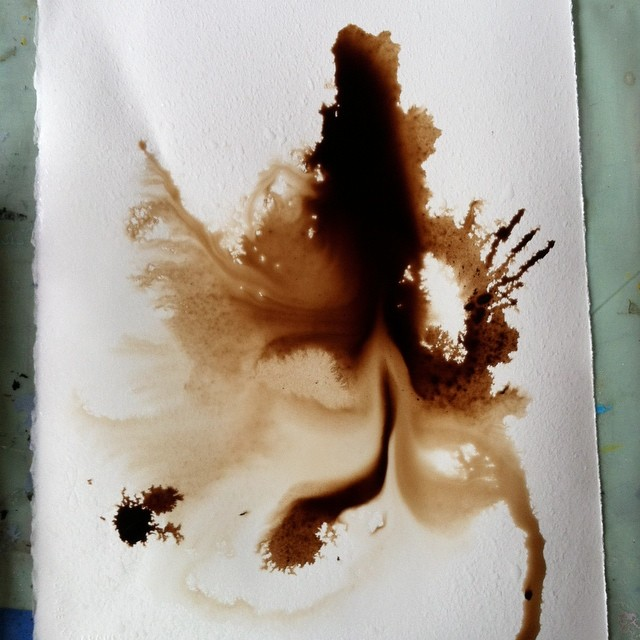
Wash with walnut ink before drying

Walnut ink is an ink made from the green husk surrounding the nut of walnuts. The black walnut Juglans nigra is usually used. The ink may be liquid or made of crystals that are mixed with water before use. It can be used to produce stains and darken paper to make it look older. The ink has good archival properties.

An ancient use of walnut ink was to stain the hands of criminals in Romani communities. Once stained, it is impossible to wash off and remains in the skin for a long period of time.
