= Jacob Gerritsz. Cuyp =

Dutch Golden Age painter (1594–1652)

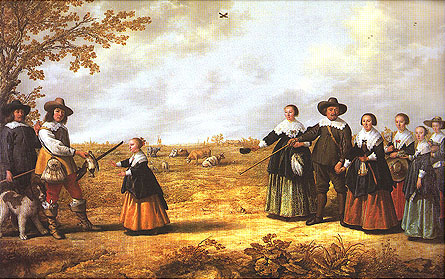
Jacob Gerritsz. Cuyp, Portrait of a Family in a Landscape, 1641

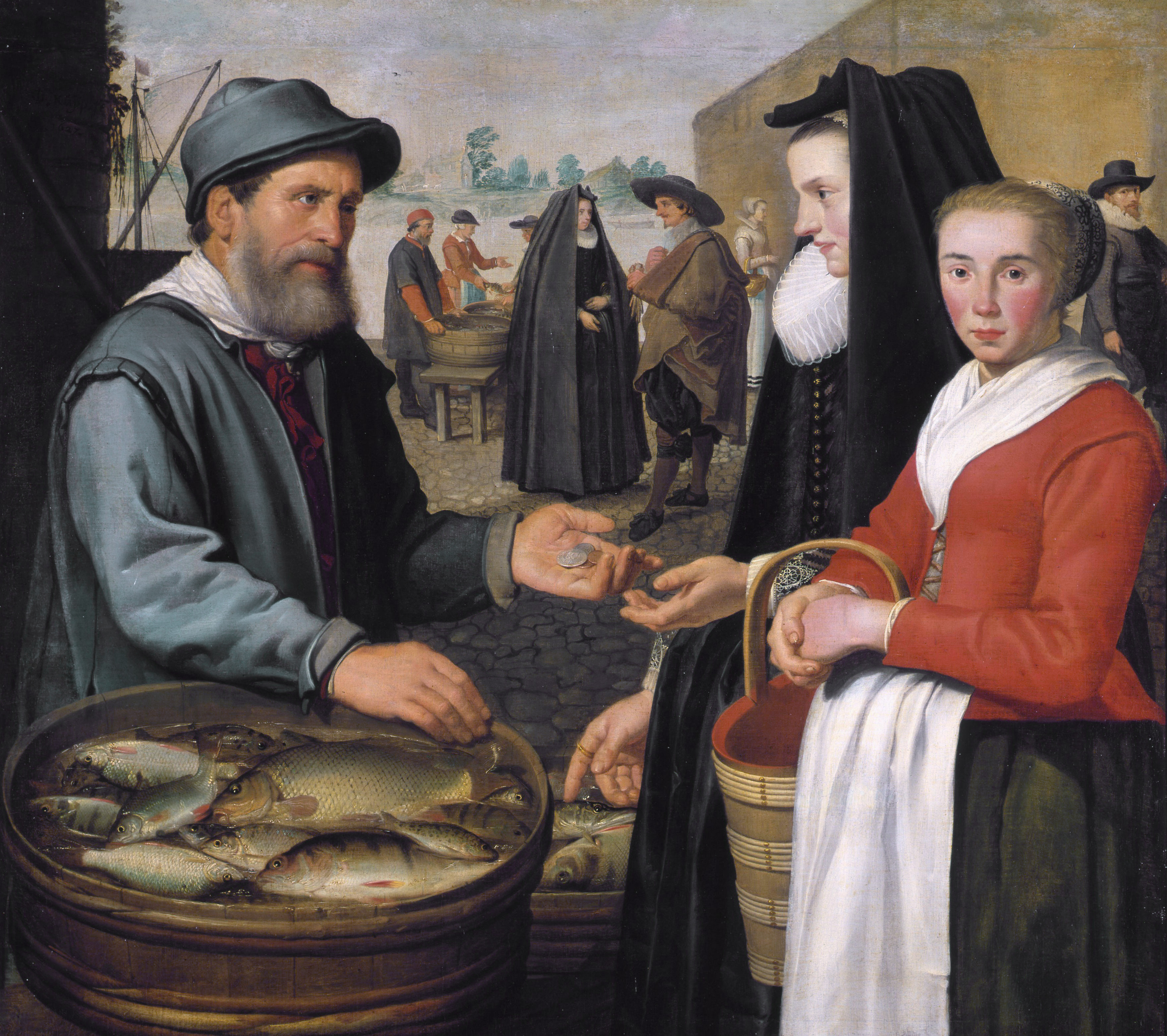
Jacob Gerritsz. Cuyp, The Fish-market

Jacob Gerritszoon (Note: Abbreviated as Gerritsz.) Cuyp or Cuijp (1594–1652) was a portrait and landscape painter, best known for his portraits.

He was born and died in Dordrecht, the son of the stained glass designer Gerrit Gerritsz. Cuyp, who moved to Dordrecht from Venlo. He was the half-brother of Benjamin Gerritsz. Cuyp and the father of the much more famous Aelbert Cuyp. He first painted still lifes, interiors with figures, and animals but later specialized in the pastoral landscapes for which he is famous.

According to Houbraken, he helped the painters Jacques de Claeuw, Isaac van Hasselt, and Cornelis Tegelberg set up a Guild of Saint Luke in Dordrecht in 1642. According to the RKD, he was a pupil of Abraham Bloemaert in Utrecht, and became a member of the Dordrecht Guild of St. Luke on 18 July 1617. He was treasurer in 1629, 1633, 1637 and 1641.

He became the later teacher of the painters Ferdinand Bol, Rafaël Govertsz Camphuysen, Aelbert Cuyp, Benjamin Gerritsz Cuyp, Hendrik Dethier, Isaac van Duynen, Bastiaan Govertsz van der Leeuw, Paulus Lesire, Aert van der Neer, Pieter Hermansz Verelst, and Ary Huybertsz Verveer.
