= Swanenburg =

Swanenburg is a Dutch surname. Notable people with the surname include:

- Claes Isaacsz Swanenburg (1572–1652), Dutch painter
- Isaac van Swanenburg (1537–1614), Dutch painter and glazier
- Jacob van Swanenburgh (1571–1638), Dutch painter
- Maria Swanenburg (1839–1915), Dutch serial killer
