= Cornelis Stooter =

Dutch Golden Age landscape painter

Cornelis Leonardsz Stooter (1595, in Leiden – 1655, in Leiden), was a Dutch Golden Age landscape painter.

== Biography ==
According to Houbraken, who called him Egmont Cornelisz Stooter, he lived in Leiden and was still painting in 1640, along with Arnout Elsevier, Jan van Goyen, and Cornelis Liefrinck.

According to the RKD he was the father of Leonard Cornelisz Stooter and though known today for seascapes, his subjects were diverse, including a flower piece and various genre scenes. He married in Leiden in February 1623 and worked there the rest of his life. In 1648 he became the first deacon of the new Leiden Guild of St. Luke. Some portraits by him were lost in the 1929 fire of Leiden's Town Hall. He is also known as Egmont Stooter, a mistake in first name deriving from Houbraken. The painter always signed briefly STO.
