= Ary Huybertsz Verveer =

Dutch Golden Age painter

Ary Huybertsz Verveer (ca.1620, Dordrecht – October 7, 1680, Dordrecht), was a Dutch Golden Age painter.

According to Houbraken he was a portrait and history painter (whose work generally included many nudes), who joined the Dordrecht Guild of Saint Luke in 1646, the same year as Abraham Susenier (still life painter), Gerard de Jager (a seascape and "pond" painter), and Arnout Elsevier (a landscape and "fire" painter). Houbraken took his information from his first teacher, the landscape painter Willem van Drielenburg, who was with Verveer, along with the painters Johannes Offermans and Arnoldus Verbuys, the day that Verveer's house burned down. Houbraken claimed that it was a fire hazard due to Verveer's habit of starting many paintings but rarely finishing them, so that his studio was filled with half-finished oil panels that went up like a fire ship (brander). Since the witnesses to this event were all much younger than Verveer, it is possible that they were his pupils, though Houbraken also mentioned that Offermans was a disciple of the Dordt painter Adriaen van Eemont.

According to the RKD, Verveer was a portrait painter and a pupil of Jacob Gerritsz Cuyp. Only one work of his is registered in the RKD, a portrait of an unknown woman.
