= Willem Isaacsz. van Swanenburg =

Dutch Golden Age engraver (1580–1612)

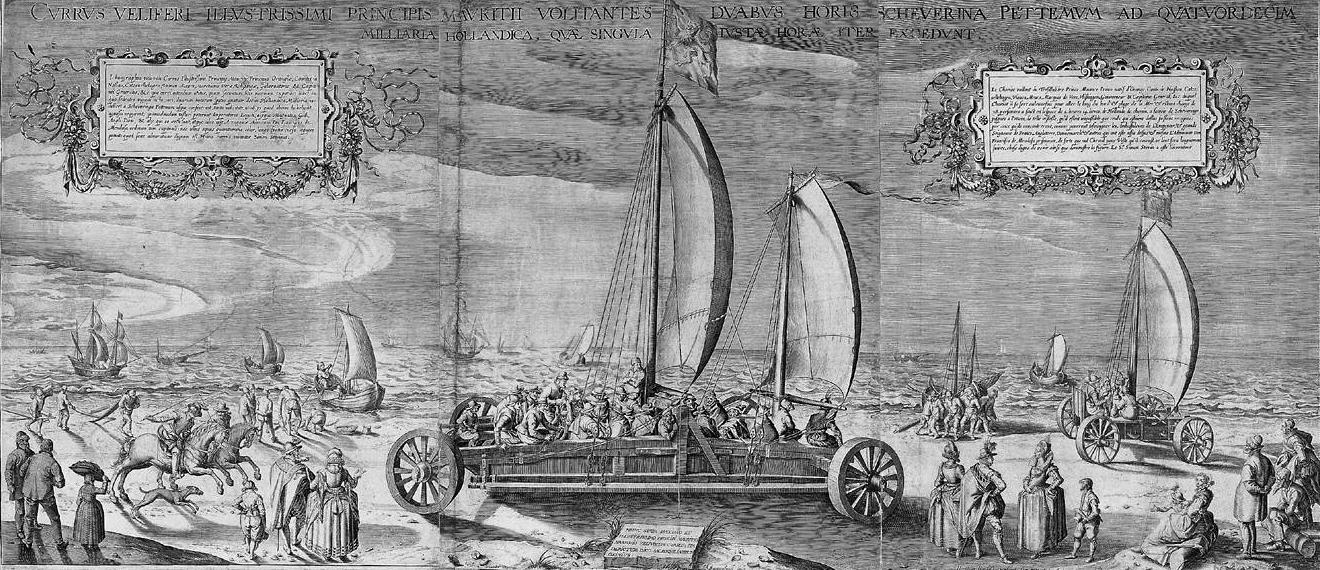
The Sailing Chariot, ca. 1603. Simon Stevin's invention of the wind car

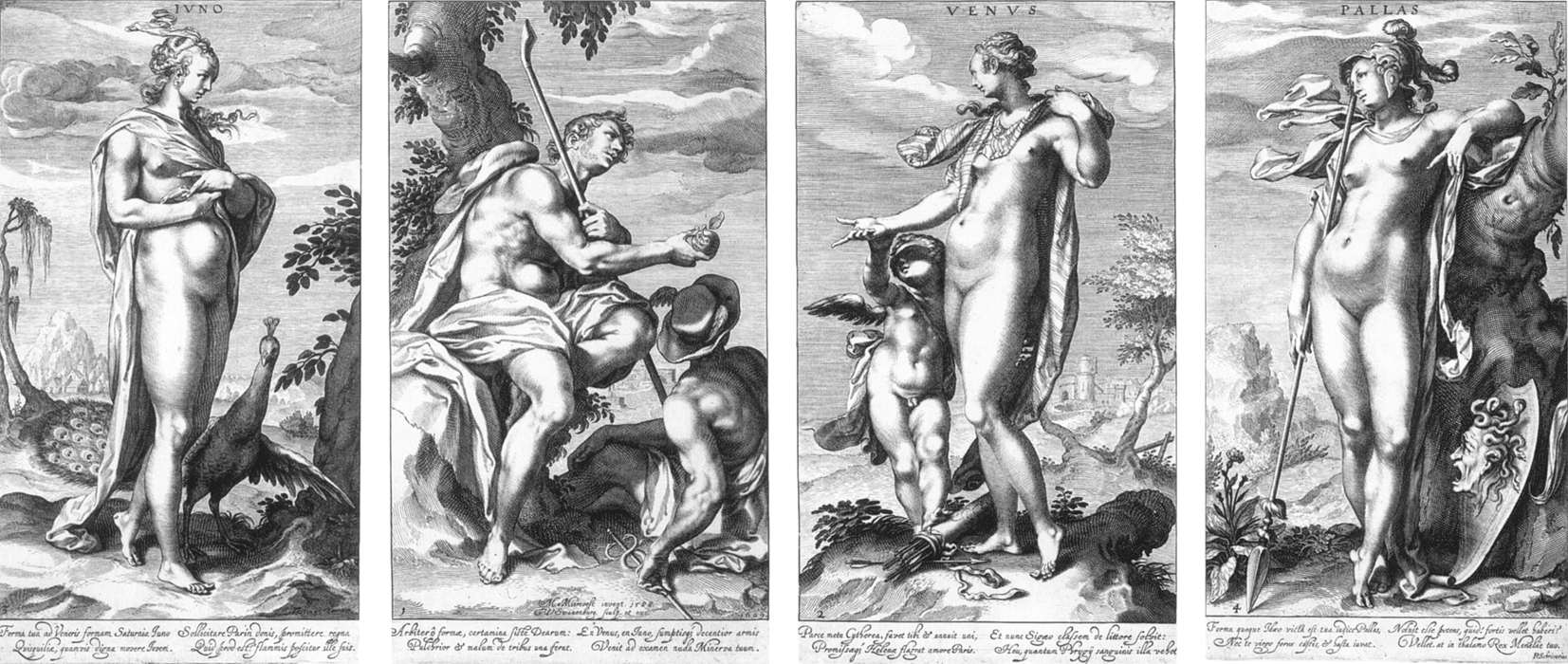
The Judgment of Paris, c. 1609

Willem Isaacsz van Swanenburg (29 January 1580 – 31 May 1612), was a Dutch Golden Age engraver and the youngest son of Isaac van Swanenburg. Isaac van Swanenburg raised three sons who all became artists. Isaac van Swanenburg was also an artist who painted, designed prints, and created stained glass windows. The subject matter of his art included Biblical scenes, genre scenes, and portraits. He was also an illustrator for many books during his time.

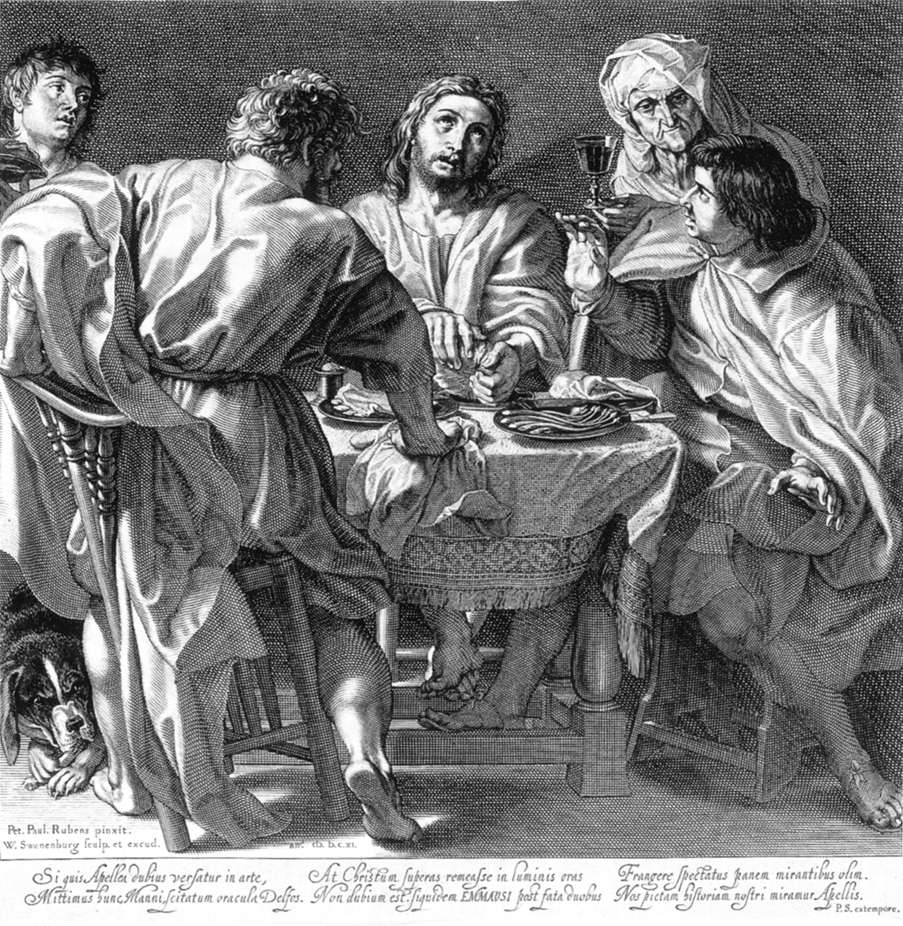
Christ at Emmaus by Willem Isaacsz van Swanenburg

== Biography ==
Swanenburg was born in Leiden. He learned drawing and engraving from his father, together with his brothers Jacob (1572–1652) and Claes (1572–1652), who both became respected painters. According to Houbraken he was a respected engraver who became "Hopman" (flag-bearer) of the Leiden schutterij, but died young.

Swanenburg was also active as a portrait engraver. In 1609 he produced the engravings for Icones ad vivum, a series of portraits of Leiden scholars and professors. In 1603 he engraved, after a design by Jacques de Gheyn II, a large three-sheet print depicting Simon Stevin's sailing carriage. The carriage had been used by Maurice, Prince of Orange, and his companions for a journey along the Dutch coast from Scheveningen to Petten in 1602. Among those associated with the journey were the young Hugo Grotius and the Spanish admiral Francisco de Mendoza, who was then held prisoner by the Dutch Republic.

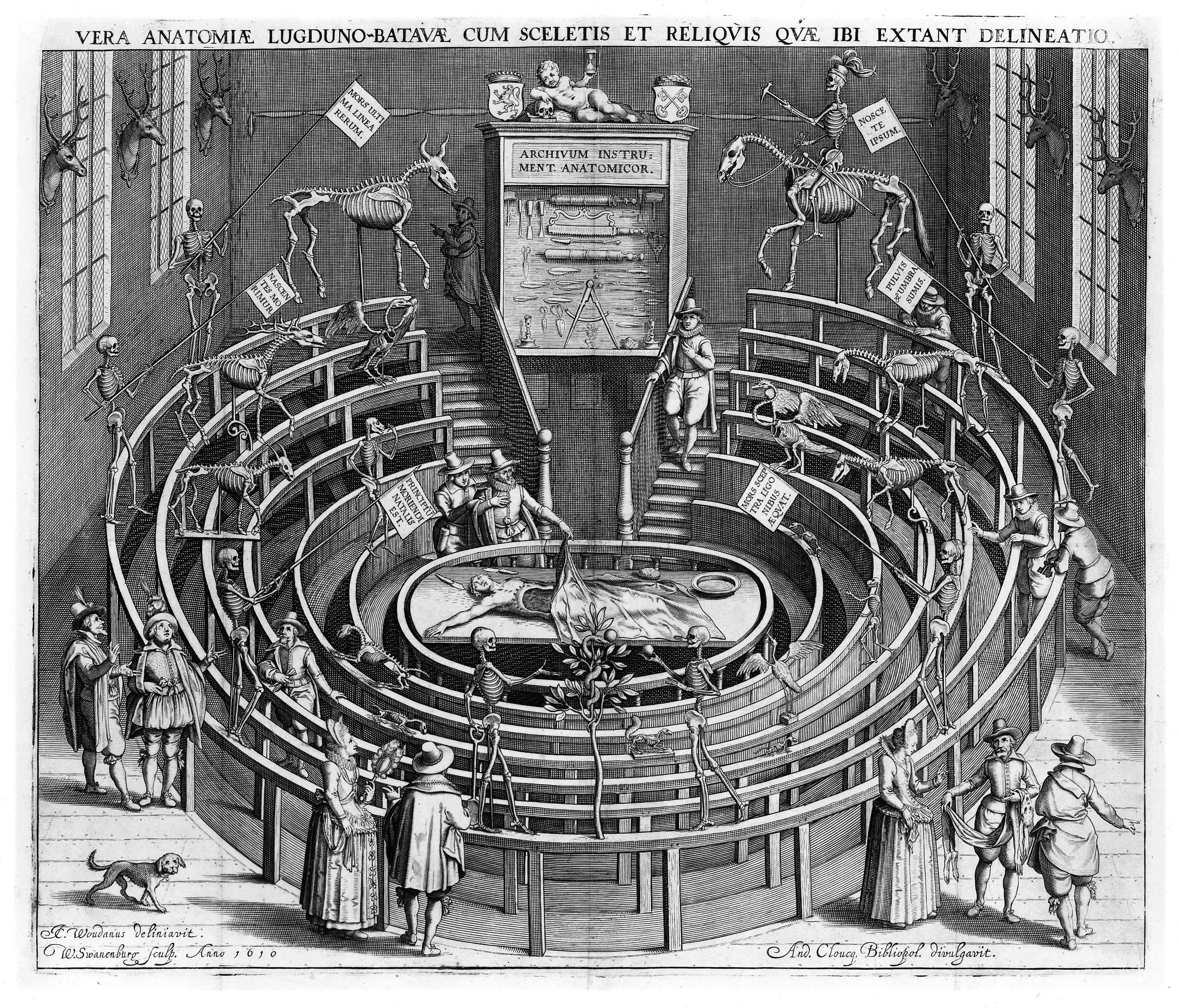
The anatomical theatre of Leiden University, early 17th century. Contemporary engraving by Willem Swanenburgh; drawing by Jan Cornelisz. van 't Woudt = Johannes Woudanus
