= Cornelis Kruys =

Dutch Golden Age painter

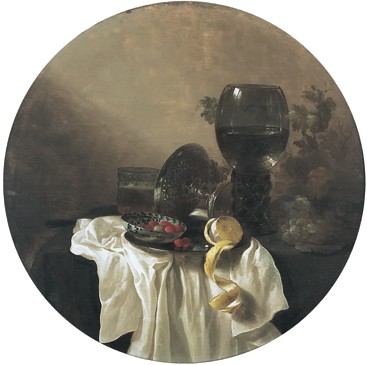
Still-life with Rummer, Tazza, and peeled lemon

Cornelis Kruys (1619, in Haarlem – 1660, in Schiedam) was a Dutch Golden Age painter.

According to the RKD, he was a painter of flower still lifes. He became a member of the Haarlem Guild of St. Luke in 1644. He became a member of the Leiden Guild of St. Luke in 1649, and moved to Schiedam in 1651.
