= Arnout Elsevier =

Dutch Golden Age landscape painter

Aernout Elsevier (1579 – c. 1656) was a Dutch Golden Age landscape painter.

== Biography ==
Elsevier was born in Douai. According to Houbraken he joined the Dordrecht Guild of St. Luke in 1646 together with Abraham Susenier and Gerard de Jager. He mentioned him again in his biographical sketch of Jan van Goyen as living in Leiden and still painting in the 1640s, along with his contemporaries Cornelis Liefrinck, and Egmont Cornelisz Stooter.

According to the RKD he worked in Leiden helping to set up the new painter's guild there from 1609 onwards. Besides Dordrecht and Leiden he worked in Vianen, Utrecht, and Rotterdam, where he reportedly lived with his second wife and where he probably died, some time after 1656. He is known for winter landscapes and "brandjes" (fires). He was the father of the painter Louwijs Aernouts Elsevier and ran a herberg (inn) as well as making his living from painting.
