= Cornelis Liefrinck =

Dutch painter

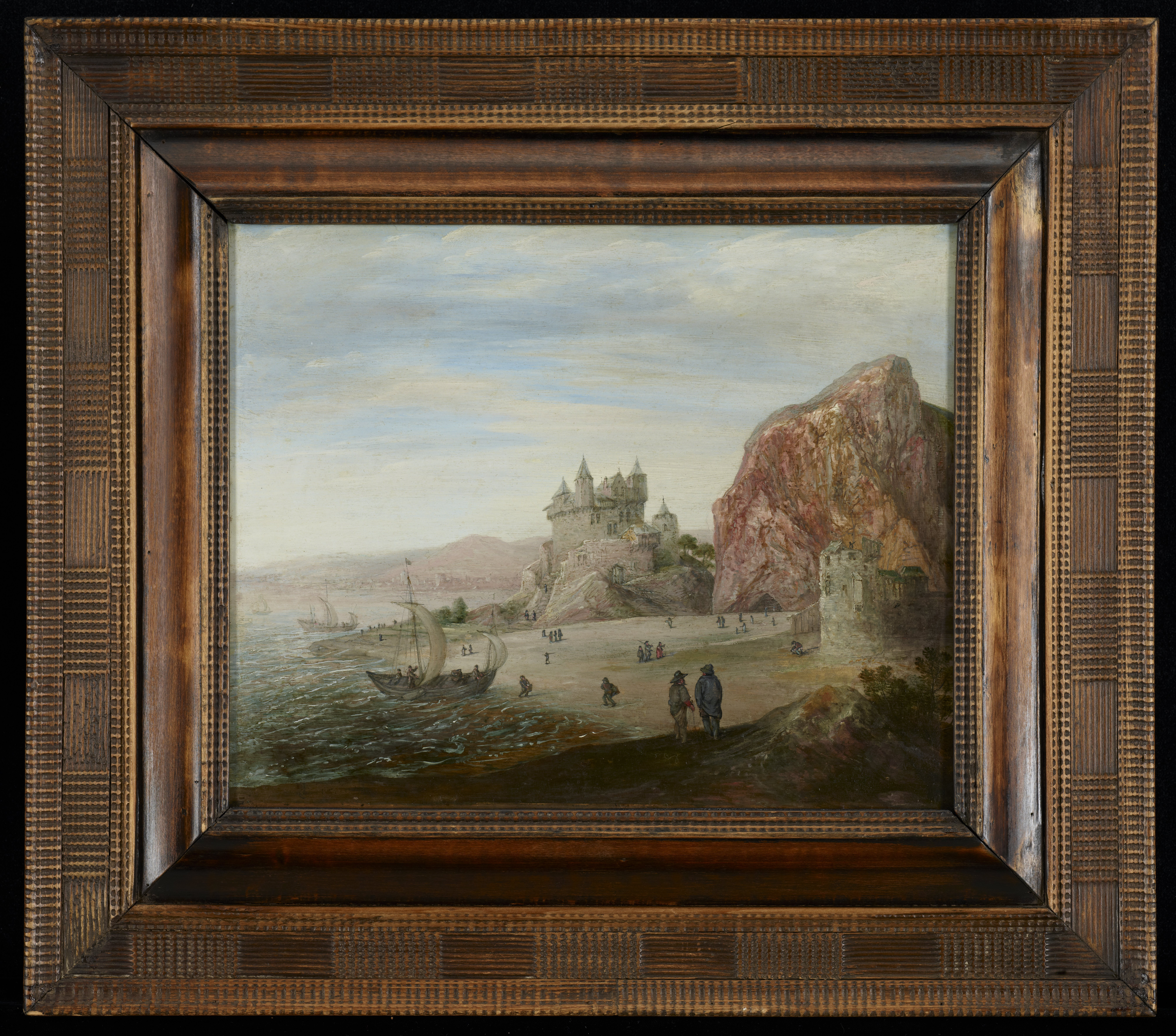
Coastal Landscape with Granite Cliffs (Minneapolis Institute of Arts)

Cornelis Liefrinck (1581 – c. 1662) was a Dutch Golden Age landscape painter.

== Biography ==
According to Houbraken he was born and lived in Leiden and was still painting in 1640, along with his contemporaries Arnout Elsevier, Jan van Goyen, and Egmont Cornelisz Stooter. Houbraken may have meant Cornelis Stooter, since both Elsevier and Stooter were founders of the Leiden Guild of St. Luke, and all four men were known as landscape painters.

According to the RKD he was the son of Hans Liefrinck II, is registered as a master painter in the Leiden Guild of St. Luke in the years 1604-1632, and became bailiff of Rijnsburg in 1627. He is known for landscapes and seascapes.
