= An Evening River Landscape with a Ferry =

Painting by Jan van Goyen

- French: Paysage fluvial, English: River Landscape
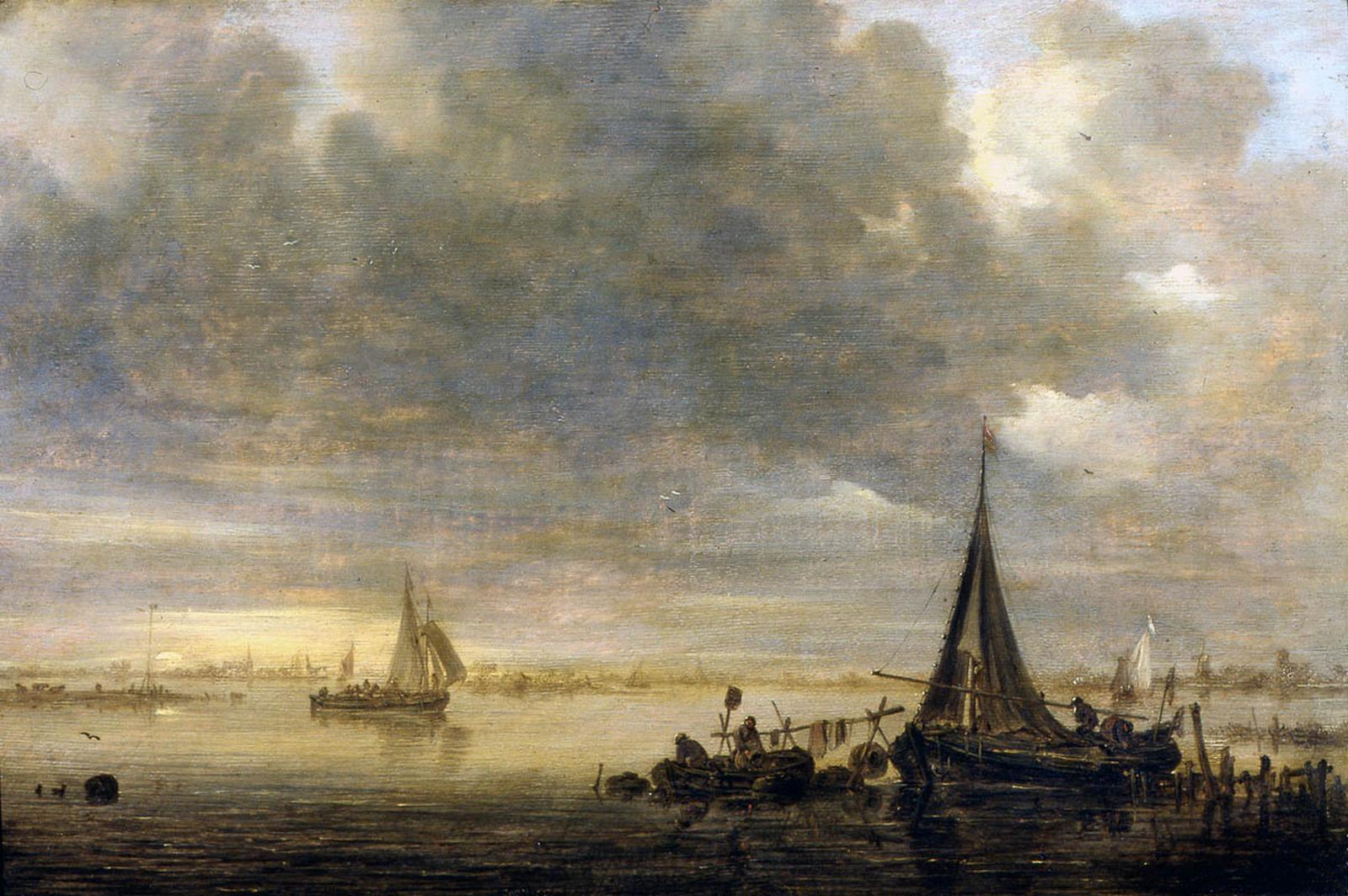
- Artist: Jan van Goyen
- Completion date: 1643
- Catalogue: 1068
- Medium: oil painting on panel (oak)
- Movement: Dutch Golden Age painting Landscape painting
- Subject: Moonrise over a river with a ferry and other boats
- Dimensions: 41 cm × 61 cm (16 in × 24 in)
- Location: Musée des Beaux-Arts, Strasbourg
- Accession: 1890

An Evening River Landscape with a Ferry (other title: River Landscape) is a 1643 painting by the Dutch painter Jan van Goyen. The painting was bought in 1890 in Paris by Wilhelm von Bode. It is now in the Musée des Beaux-Arts of Strasbourg, France. Its inventory number is 221.

Not without pride, the 2009 catalogue of the Flemish and Dutch paintings of the Musée des Beaux-Arts calls Van Goyen's painting "indisputably one of the most beautiful landscape paintings of the Dutch school" (sans conteste l′un des plus beaux paysages de la peinture hollandaise).
