= Van Goyen Looking Out for a Subject =

Painting by J. M. W. Turner

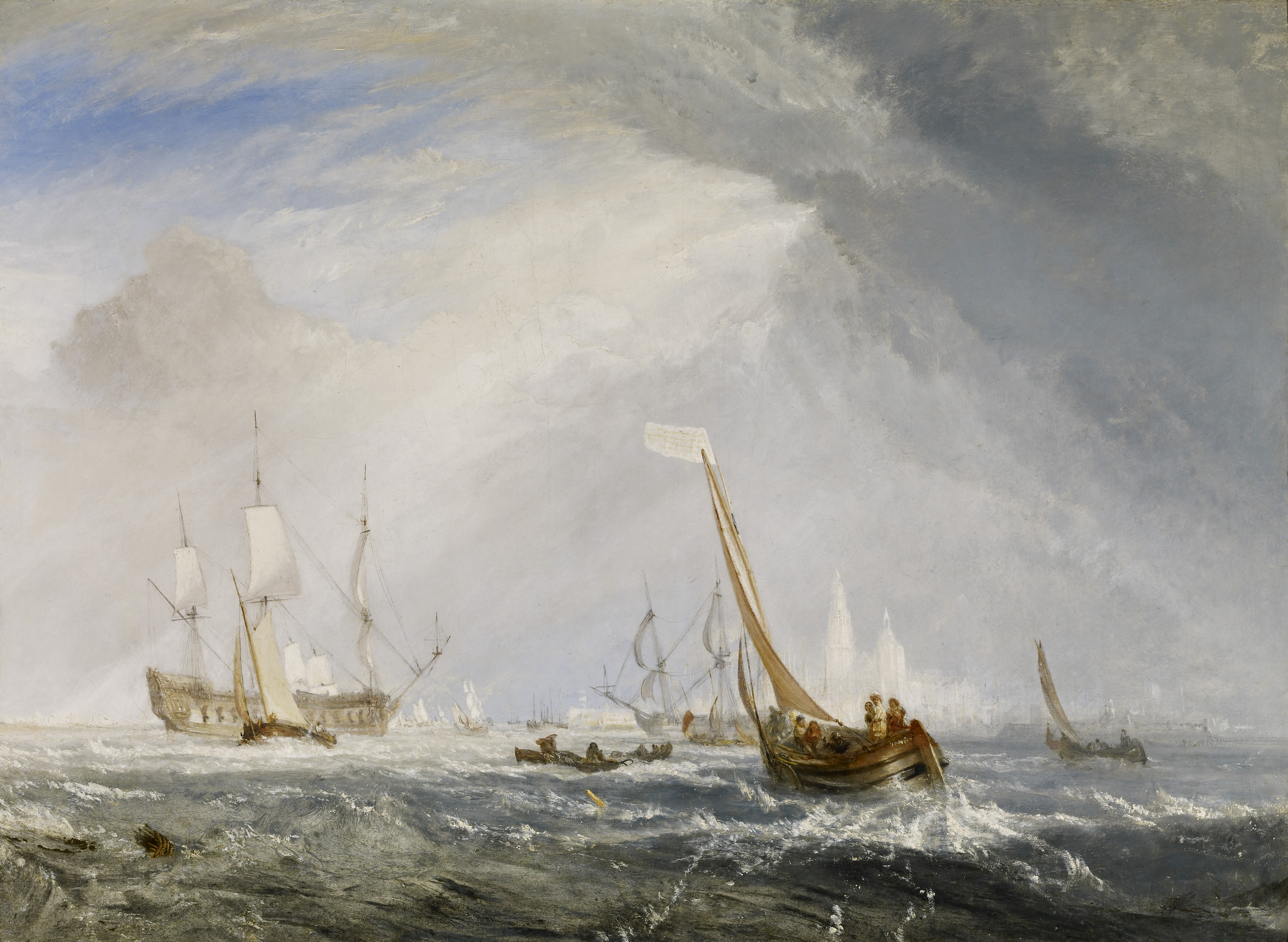
- Artist: J. M. W. Turner
- Year: 1833
- Type: Oil on canvas, seascape painting
- Dimensions: 91.8 cm × 122.9 cm (36.1 in × 48.4 in)
- Location: Frick Collection; New York City

Antwerp: Van Goyen Looking Out for a Subject is an 1833 oil painting by the British artist J.M.W. Turner. Combining seascape and history painting, it depicts a scene in the harbour off Antwerp. The seventeenth century Dutch painter Jan van Goyen is shown on a vessel sketching as he looks for inspiration for his next major work. Antwerp's Cathedral can be seen in the very distance. The picture was displayed at the Royal Academy Exhibition of 1833 held at Somerset House in London. It was exhibited alongside another painting by Turner Bridge of Sighs, Ducal Palace and Custom-House, Venice: Canaletti Painting which also made reference to art history with its depiction of the noted Venetian painter Canaletto at work.

The work was at one time owned by the whaling magnate and art collector Elhanan Bicknell, who purchased several of Turner's pictures from the artist. Today the painting is in the Frick Collection in New York City, having been purchased by Henry Clay Frick who left it to the gallery in 1919.

== See also ==
- List of paintings by J. M. W. Turner

== Bibliography ==
- Bachrach, Fred G. Turner's Holland. Tate Gallery, 1994.
- Solkin, David H. (ed.) Art on the Line: The Royal Academy Exhibitions at Somerset House, 1780-1836. Courthald Gallery, 2001.
