= Claes Isaacsz. van Swanenburg =

Dutch painter

Claes Isaacsz. van Swanenburg (1572 in Leiden – 1652 in Leiden), was a Dutch Golden Age painter.

== Biography ==
According to Houbraken he was the second son of Isaac van Swanenburg who worked in Leiden. His works were popular.

According to the RKD he was the brother of Jacob and Willem Isaacsz. Swanenburg. In 1607 he got married and in 1608 he became a member of the Hague Guild of St. Luke. Though a member of the Hague guild, he continued to be active in Leiden and painted an over-the-mantel piece for the Leiden vierschaar in 1613. In 1648 he became a member of the Leiden Guild of St. Luke that was founded the same year.
