= Jacob Isaacsz. van Swanenburg =

Dutch painter

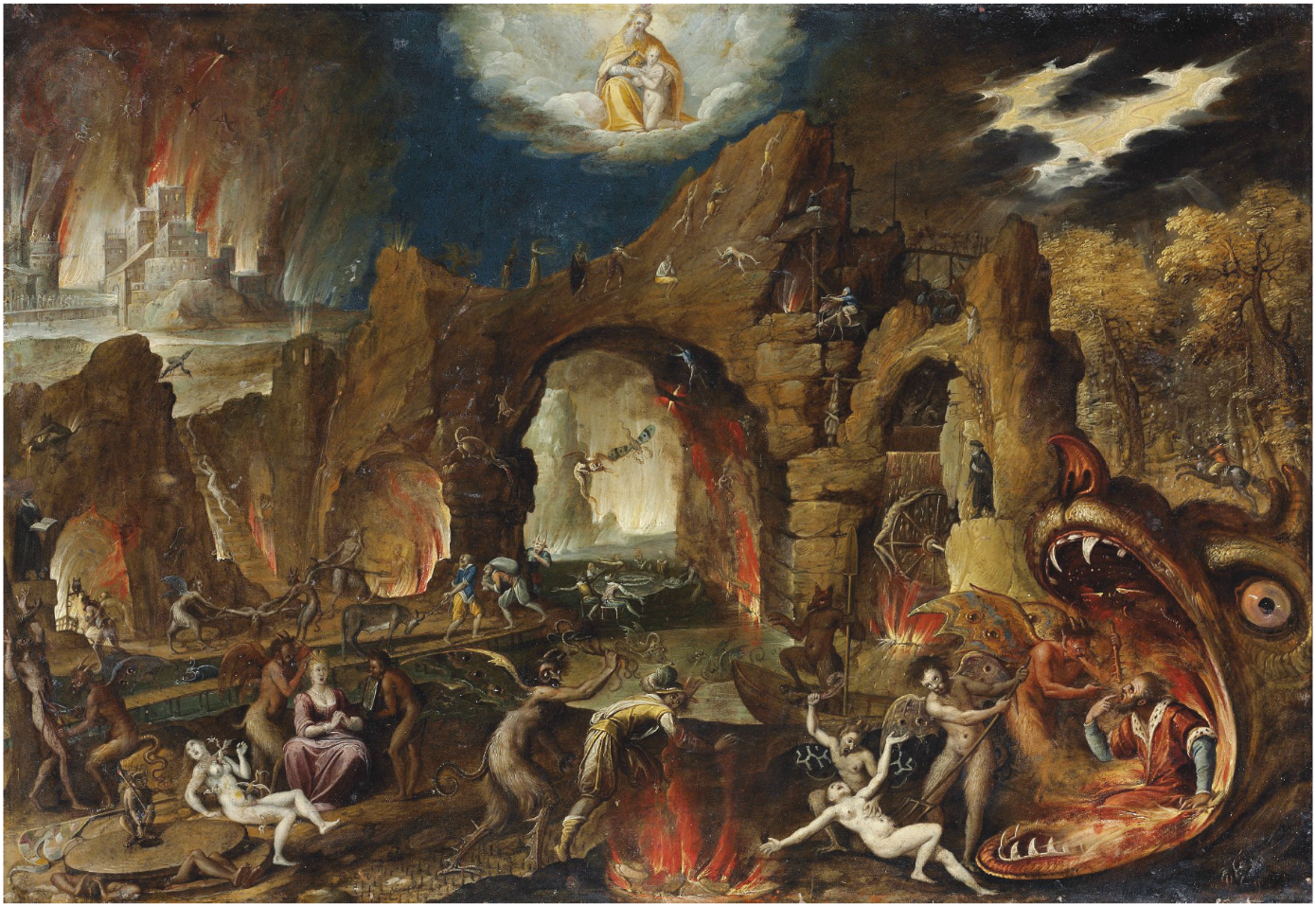
The Harrowing of Hell

Jacob Isaacszoon van Swanenburg (Note: Alternative name forms: Jacob Isaacsz. van Swanenburch, Jakob Isaacsz. van Swanenburch and Jakob Isaacsz. van Swanenburgh; aliases include Monogrammist IVS (or JVS) and Danziger Höllenmeister.) (Dutch pronunciation: [ˈjaːkɔp fɑn ˈsʋaːnə(m)bʏr(ə)x]; 1571 in Leiden – 1638 in Utrecht) was a Dutch painter, draftsman and art dealer. He was known for his city views, history paintings, Christian religious scenes and portraits. He spent a substantial part of his early career in Italy before returning to his native Leiden. He was the teacher of the young Rembrandt.

== Life ==
Jacob Isaacszoon van Swanenburg was born in Leiden as the son of Isaac Claesz. van Swanenburg. His father was a painter and designer of prints, stained glass windows and other objects and also served multiple times as Leiden's mayor. His father had been a pupil of the leading Flemish history Frans Floris in Antwerp and received major civil and religious commissions in Leiden where he was the leading history painter of his time. Jacob had two younger brothers who also became artists: Claes (1572-1652) was a painter while Willem (1580-1612) was a printmaker. The van Swanenburg family was largely of the Arminian faith and after 1618-1619, Remonstrant.

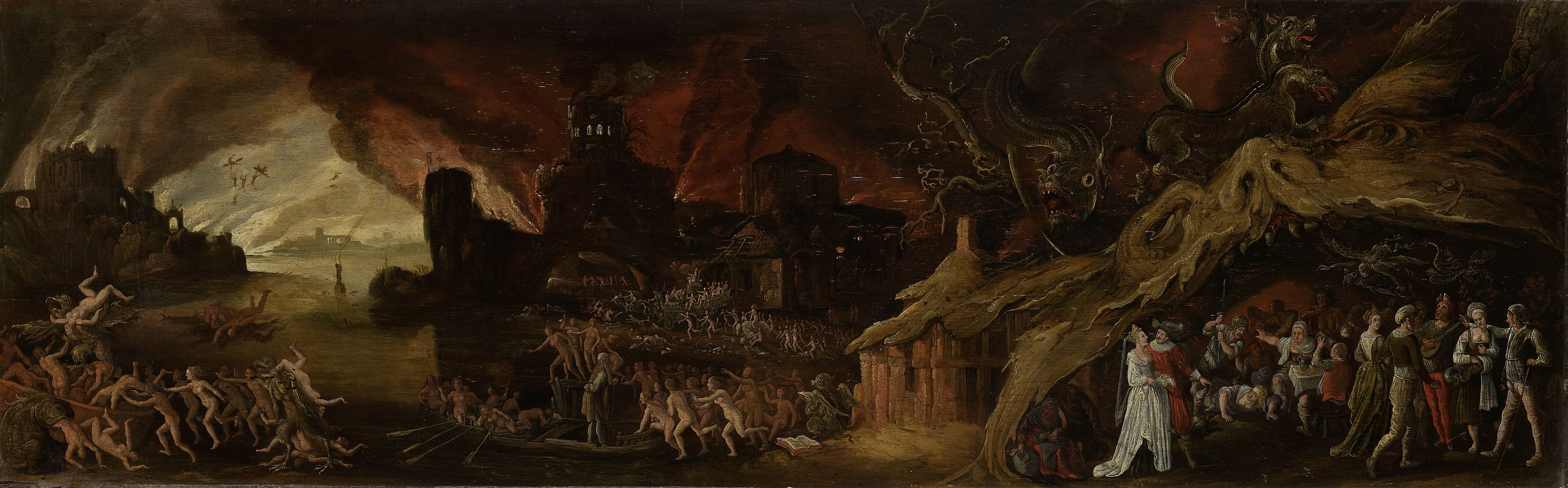
The Last Judgment and the Seven Deadly Sins

Van Swanenburg left Holland for Italy but information about his sojourn is scarce. The artist was in Venice around 1591. In Italy he also spent time in Rome as is demonstrated by his View of St. Peter's Square in Rome. He had settled in Naples around 1598. He married on 28 November 1599 Margaretha De Cardone, the daughter of a local grocer. He sold his paintings directly from his workshop in Naples. In 1608 he ran foul of the Neapolitan Inquisition for displaying paintings depicting scenes of witchcraft in his shop. The accusation related to a large canvas depicting a number of witches and devils engaging in perverse acts, which he had displayed outside his shop. During the proceedings van Swanenburg explained that he had only taken out the picture which he had begun three years earlier for cleaning and varnishing. He declared to have studied the art of painting in Venice without a master. He was able to convince the inquisitor of his good character and got off with a severe reprimand. Had the inquisitor known that van Swanenburg was a non-Catholic the punishment would likely have been more severe.

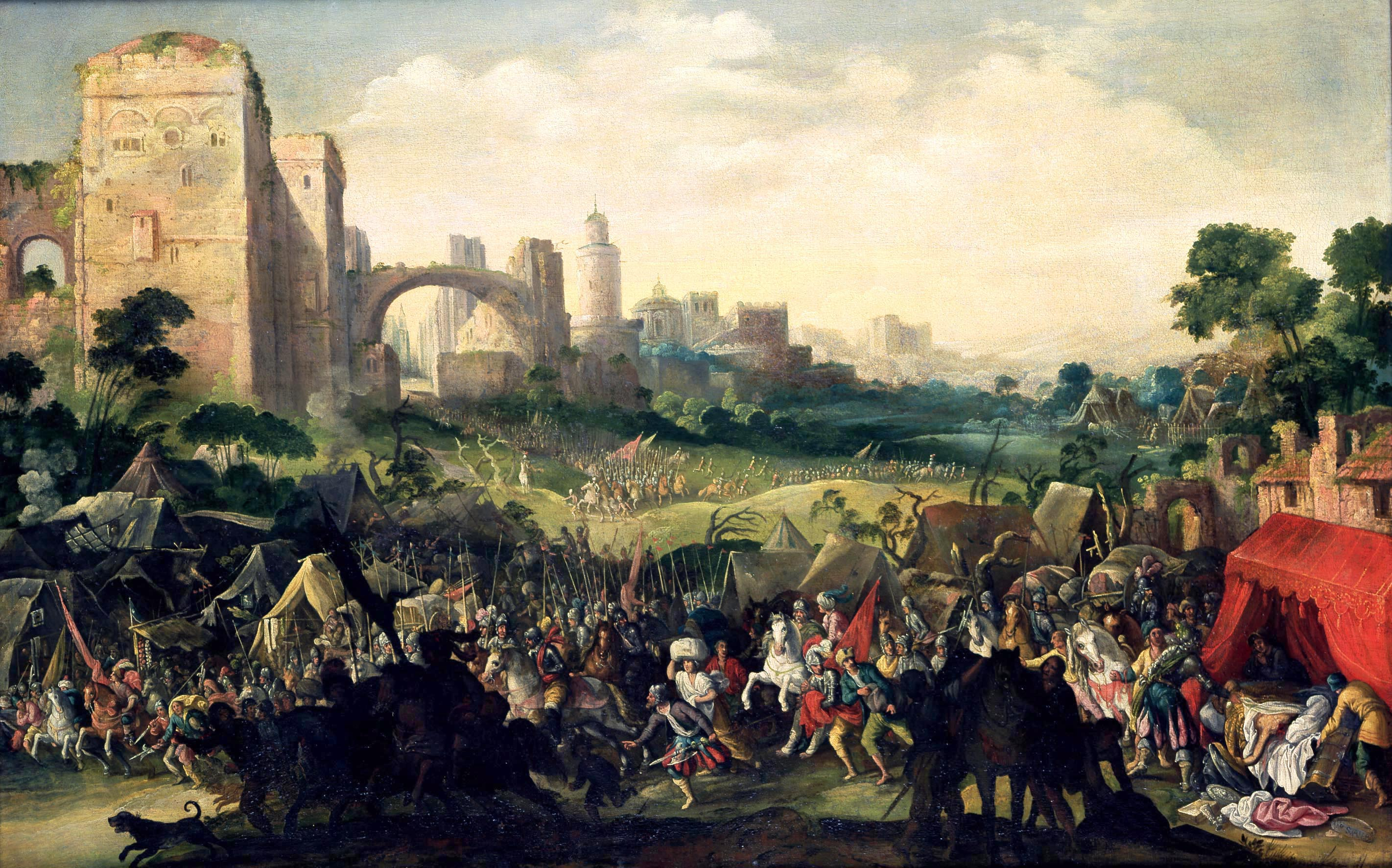
The siege of Bethulia

Van Swanenburg returned to his native Leiden without his family in 1615. His return may have been related to the death of his father the year before. He travelled back to Naples in 1617 to move his household permanently to Leiden. On 6 January 1618 the artist along with his wife and three surviving children arrived in Leiden. Here van Swanenburg achieved success as a painter and received commissions from local and non-local patrons.

He was registered as a master of the young Rembrandt in 1620. While the subjects of van Swanenburg (mainly cityscapes and hell scenes) did not leave a noticeable mark on Rembrandt's work, Rembrandt's use of chiaroscuro and his interest in artificial lighting may have their roots in van Swanenburg's fiery hell scenes. Rembrandt may also have continued in his work a technique of producing paintings which starts with laying out the composition upon the support in stages, building up the picture from the background to the foreground and applying glazing or finishing layers.

He died in 1638 while on a trip to Utrecht. He was buried in the St. Pieter's Kerk in Leiden next to his father.

== Work ==
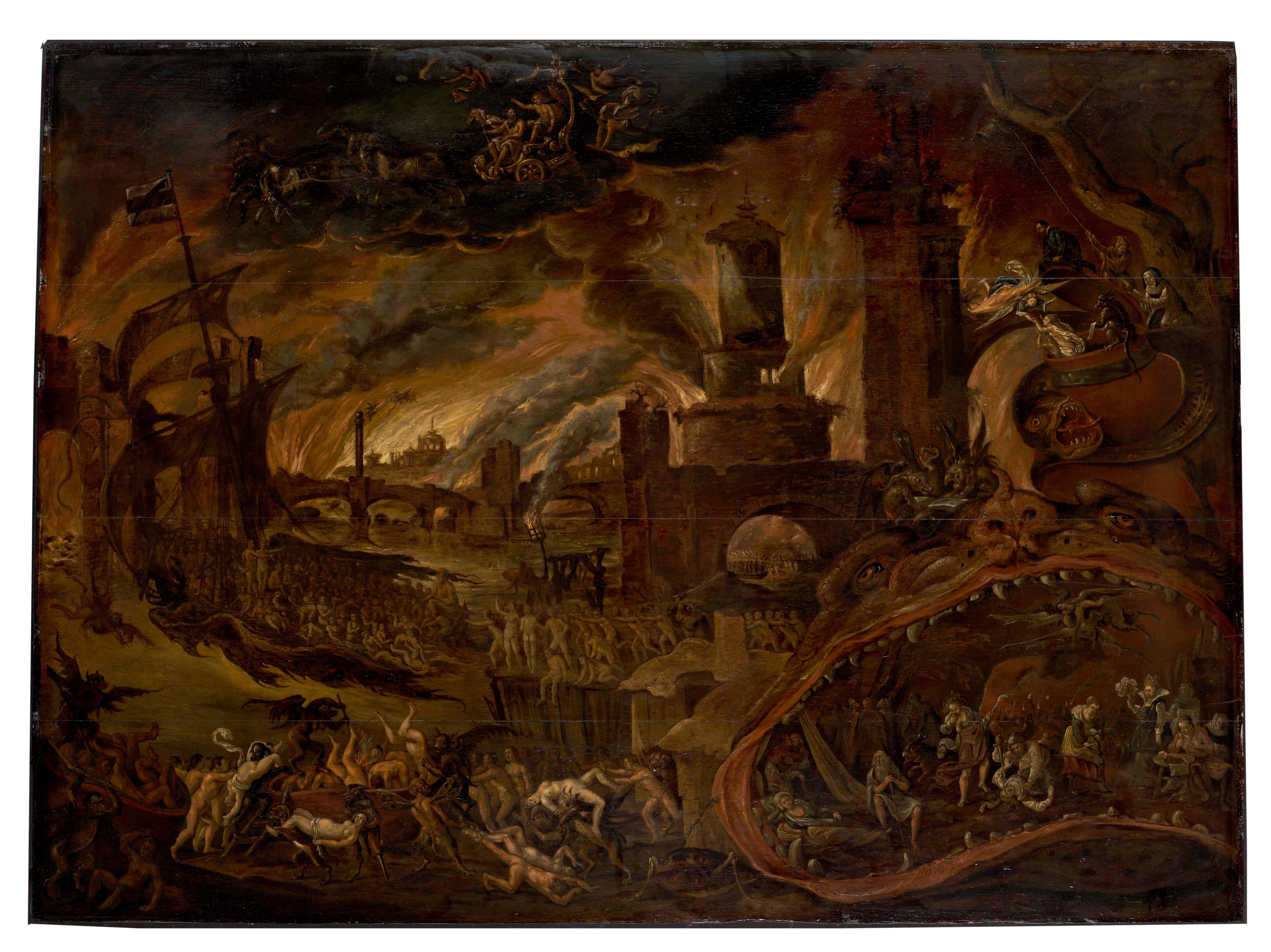
The Sibyl showing Aeneas the Underworld, Charon's boat

Only about 11 works have been attributed to van Swanenburg. These works deal with two principal subjects: three are city views while eight depict scenes of hell. He is reported to have painted portraits but none have been attributed to him.

The hell scenes deal with different subjects: one sets out all the tortures of inferno, two deal with the story of Pluto and Proserpina from Ovid's Metamorphoses and two include a depiction of the seven deadly sins. Four pictures show the entrance to hell and two of these include the story of Aeneas with the Cumaean Sibyl from Virgil's Aeneid. These references to Ovid and Virgil were not original and were clearly derived from the work of the Flemish painter Jan Brueghel the Elder who had been a pioneer of the hell scene.

An example of a hell scene is The Sibyl showing Aeneas the Underworld, Charon's boat (circa 1620, Museum De Lakenhal). The picture shows the god of the underworld, Pluto, steering a chariot across the sky. On the left the boat of Charon carries the souls of the dead to the underworld. In a huge mouth the seven deadly sins are represented through various characters: a reclining woman is the personification of laziness, a love couple of lust, a woman who pulls out her tongue is slander, a woman with a pouch represents avarice, a dressed up lady with a mirror depicts vanity and an eating man intemperance. The scene is further completed with crowds of naked people and monsters engaged in perverse acts, fantastic ships and an eerie background with ancient ruins, flames and clouds of smoke.

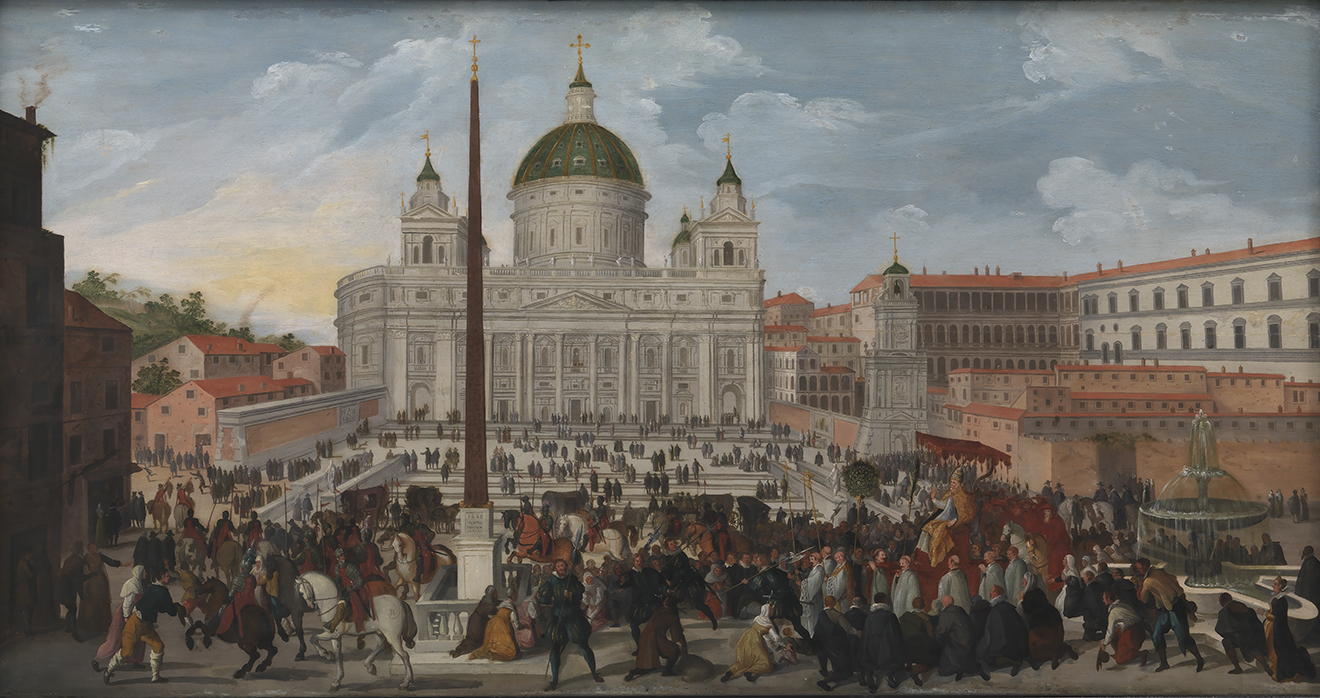
St. Peter's Square in Rome with a papal procession

Van Swanenburg's city views include a biblical scene of The siege of Bethulia (Museum De Lakenhal), which the artist completed in Naples in 1615. It depicts the apocryphal biblical story of the siege of the Jewish mountain town Bethulia by the Babylonians. The most important scene in the lower right corner is barely noticeable. There lies the lifeless body of the Babylonian general Holofernes. He was beheaded by the Jewish heroine Judith, who had cunningly entered his tent, plied him with drink, and then beheaded him. She took the head back to Bethulia as a trophy.

Van Swanenburg also painted a topographical scene of St. Peter's Square in Rome with a papal procession (1628, National Gallery of Denmark).
