= Abraham Susenier =

Dutch Golden Age painter

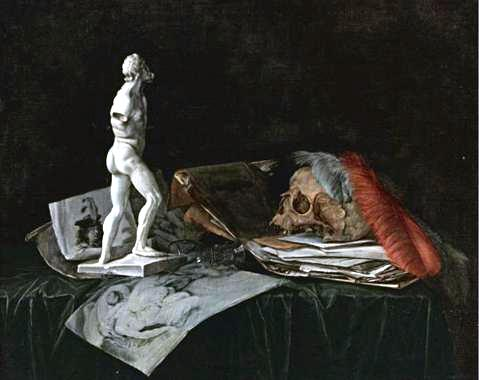
Vanitas with skull, feathers, roemer, sculpture, and drawings

Abraham Susenier (c. 1620 in Leiden – 1666/72 in Dordrecht), was a Dutch Golden Age painter.

According to Houbraken he was a still life painter especially good at painting silverwork, who joined the Dordrecht Guild of Saint Luke in 1646, the same year as Ary Huybertsz Verveer (history painter), Gerard de Jager (a seascape and "pond" painter), and Arnout Elsevier (a landscape and "fire" painter).

According to the RKD his monogram "AB S" was mistaken for Abraham Steenwyck or Abraham van Beijeren up to the 20th century, and only recently have his works been reattributed. A Dordrecht estate inventory from 1682 of the Van Slingelandt family mentions 18 works by Susenier, mostly landscapes.

== Works ==
Still Life with a Lobster, Römer, Oysters, Grapes, and a Knife, an oil painting from the 1660s, currently hangs in the Utah Museum of Fine Arts. The painting was featured in Matters of Taste: Food and Drink in 17th-century Dutch Art and Life, Albany Institute of History and Art, Albany, NY, 21 September to 8 December 2002. The bold use of red, an expensive paint at the time, is a visual cue to anyone who would have seen it that the person who commissioned the work was more than financially secure.
