= Isaac Claesz. van Swanenburg =

Dutch painter (1537–1614)

Isaac van Swanenburg
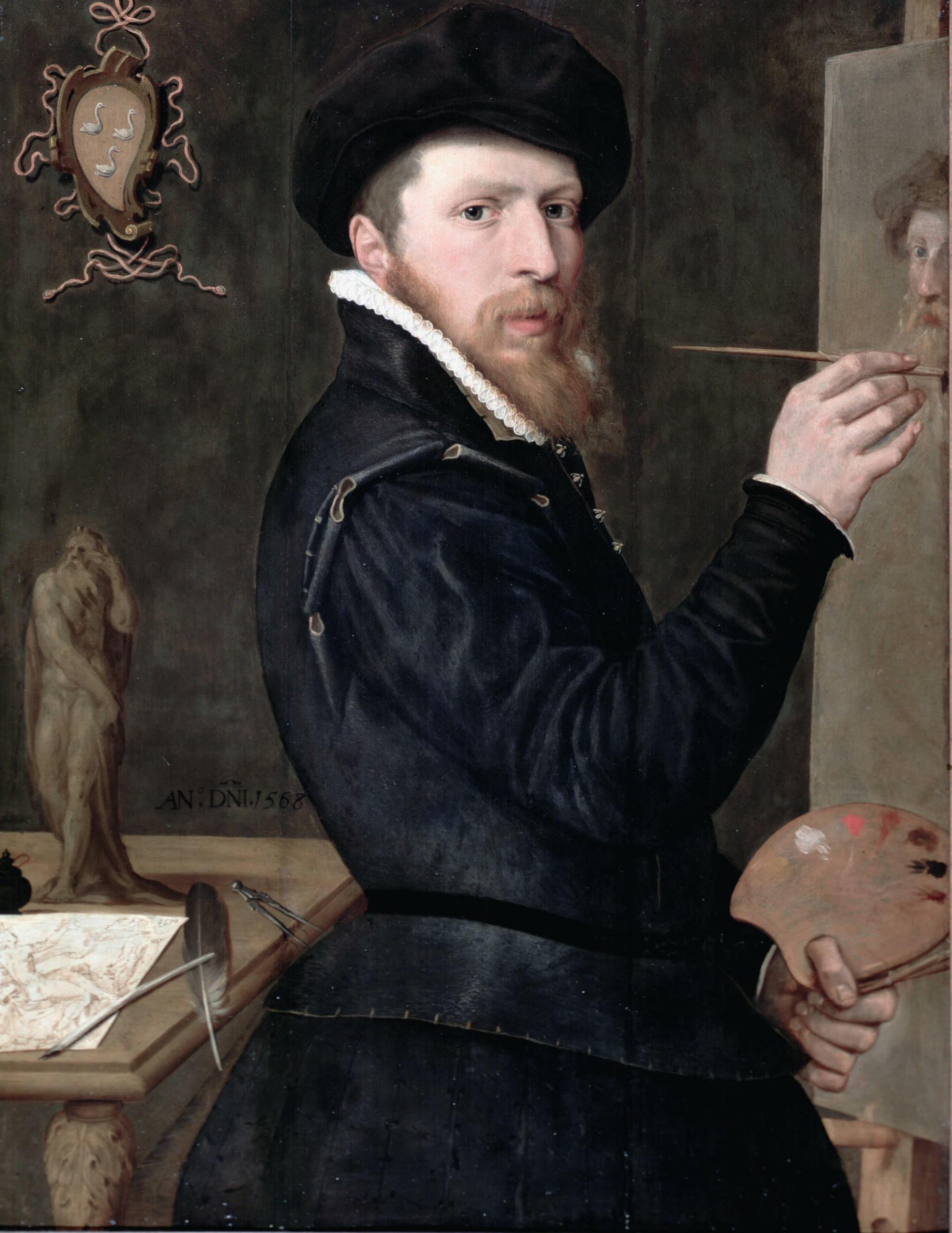
- Self-portrait 1568
- Born: Isaac Claesz; 1537; Leiden
- Died: 1614 (aged 76–77); Leiden
- Known for: Painting, Stained glass, Politics
- Movement: Renaissance

Isaak Nicolai or Isaac Claesz van Swanenburg (1537 – 1614 in Leiden) was a Dutch Renaissance painter and glazier active in Leiden and Gouda. He was a city council member from 1576 and became mayor of Leiden five times.

== Biography ==
According to Houbraken, Swanenburg was a very good painter, whose paintings hung in various council buildings of Leiden. Houbraken was surprised that Swanenburg was never mentioned in Karel van Mander's Schilder-boeck. Houbraken was however mistaken, because Swanenburg is mentioned as one of more than 20 disciples of Frans Floris in Van Mander's long list of pupils. According to the Netherlands Institute for Art History, Swanenburg was in Antwerp studying with Floris for 6–8 years in his youth, and settled in Leiden after his training in 1565. He briefly fled to Hamburg for a year during the Siege of Leiden, but had returned by 1574. He kept a large and respected workshop in Leiden, for oil- and glass painting. His pupils were Jan van Goyen, Coenraet van Schilperoort, Otto van Veen, and his three sons. He was buried in the Pieterskerk, Leiden.

== Paintings ==
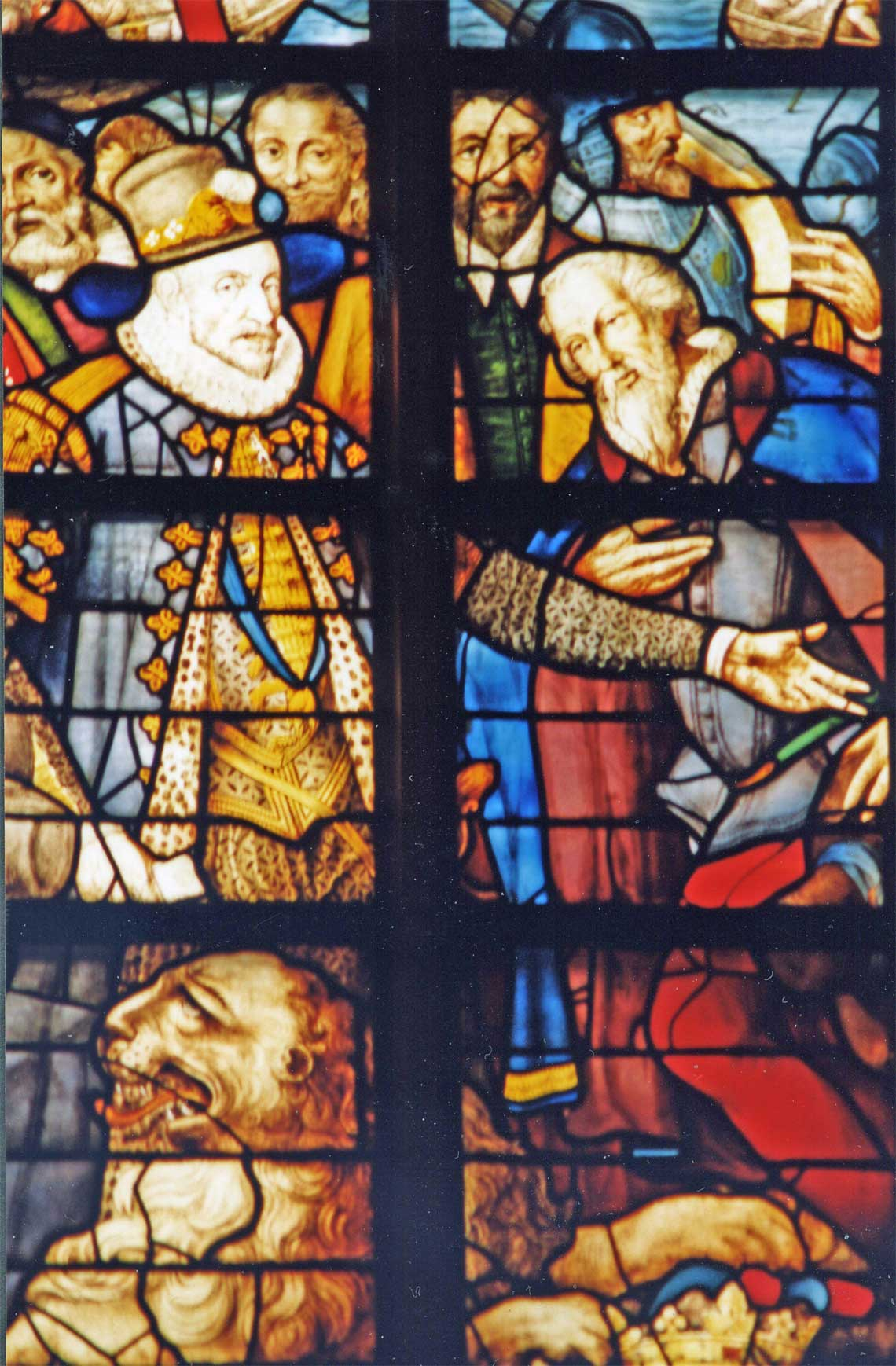
Detail of Glass 25, William of Orange freeing townspeople from Spanish tyranny after the siege of Leiden

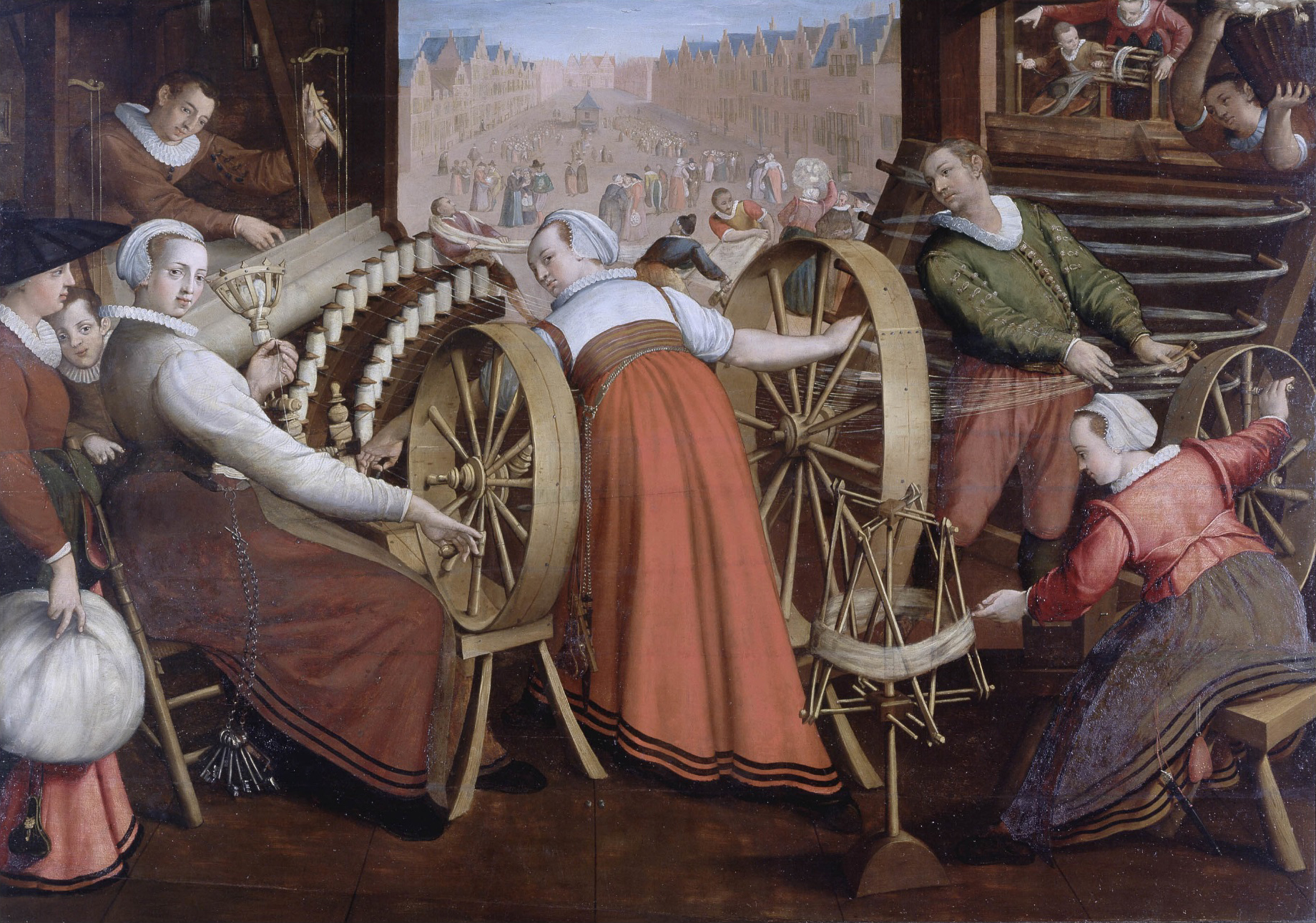
Spinning wool, a larger-than-life painting of the wool trade in Leiden with a view of two small workers' homes, 1595, by Isaac van Swanenburg

Swanenburg created the cartoons for the stained glass windows no. 25 and 26 from Leiden to the Janskerk in Gouda. The reference in Van Mander is to Isaack Claessen Cloeck, which is revealing considering that the registers of Gouda show Swanenburg was paid a third of the sum that went to the Leiden glasspainter Cornelis Cornelisz Clock. This Clock was a probable relative.

== Legacy ==
Swanenburg's paintings of various notable burgers of Leiden have survived, as well as a series of monumental historical allegories on the wool trade, an important source of income for the city during his time as councilman.

Swanenburg's oldest son, Jacob Isaacsz Swanenburg, became a painter and a master of the young Rembrandt. Claes Isaacsz Swanenburg also became a painter and lived and worked in the Hague, where his art was appreciated. The youngest son, Willem Isaacsz Swanenburg, became an engraver.

== Literature ==
- Ute Elisabeth Flieger: Bürgerstolz und Wollgewerbe. Der Bilderzyklus des Isaac Claesz. van Swanenburg (1537-1614) in der Lakenhal von Leiden. Magisterarbeit Universität Münster. Münster, Waxmann, 2010. ISBN 978-3-8309-2256-8
- Rudolf E.O. Ekkart: Isaac Claesz. van Swanenburg, 1537-1614. Leids schilder en burgemeester. Zwolle, Waanders, 1998. ISBN 90-400-9282-6
