= Jan van Goyen =

Dutch landscape painter (1596–1656)

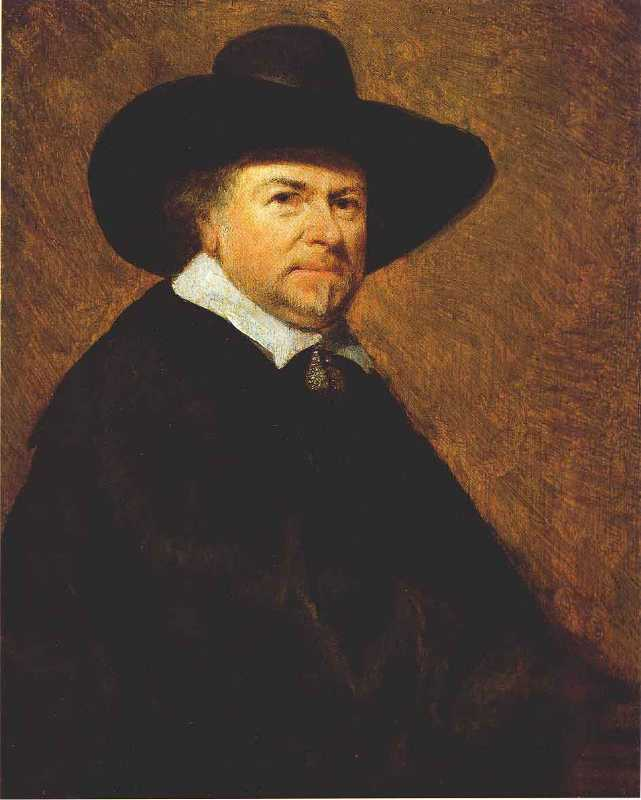
- Portrait of Jan von Goyen by Gerard ter Borch
- Born: Jan Josephszoon van Goyen; 13 January 1596; Leiden, Dutch Republic
- Died: 27 April 1656 (aged 60); The Hague, Dutch Republic
- Education: Esaias van de Velde
- Known for: Landscape painting
- Movement: Dutch Golden Age

Jan Josephszoon van Goyen (Dutch pronunciation: [ˈjɑɱ vɑŋ ˈɣoːi.ə(n)]; 13 January 1596 – 27 April 1656) was a Dutch landscape painter. The scope of his landscape subjects was very broad as he painted forest landscapes, marine paintings, river landscapes, beach scenes, winter landscapes, cityscapes, architectural views and landscapes with peasants. The list of painters he influenced is much longer. He was an extremely prolific artist who left approximately twelve hundred paintings and more than one thousand drawings.

== Biography ==
Jan van Goyen was the son of a shoemaker and started as an apprentice in Leiden, the town of his birth. Van Goyen began training in Leiden at the age of ten under Isaac van Swanenburgh and later spent a brief period in France before studying with Esaias van de Velde in Haarlem. Like many Dutch painters of his time, he studied art in the town of Haarlem with Esaias van de Velde. At age 35, he established a permanent studio at The Hague (Den Haag). Crenshaw tells (and mentions the sources) that van Goyen's landscape paintings rarely fetched high prices, but he made up for the modest value of individual pieces by increasing his production, painting thinly and quickly with a limited palette of inexpensive pigments. Despite his market innovations, he always sought more income, not only through related work as an art dealer and auctioneer but also by speculating in tulips (he was the last known victim of the tulip mania of the 1630s) and real estate. Although the latter was usually a safe avenue of investing money, in van Goyen's experience it led to enormous debts. Paulus Potter rented one of his houses. Though he seems to have kept a workshop, his only registered pupils were Nicolaes van Berchem, Jan Steen, and Adriaen van der Kabel. The list of painters he influenced is much longer.

In 1652 and 1654, he was forced to sell his collection of paintings and graphic art, and he subsequently moved to a smaller house. He died in 1656 in The Hague, still unbelievably 18,000 guilders in debt, forcing his widow to sell their remaining furniture and paintings. Van Goyen's troubles also may have affected the early business prospects of his student and son-in-law Jan Steen, who left The Hague in 1654.

== Dutch painting ==
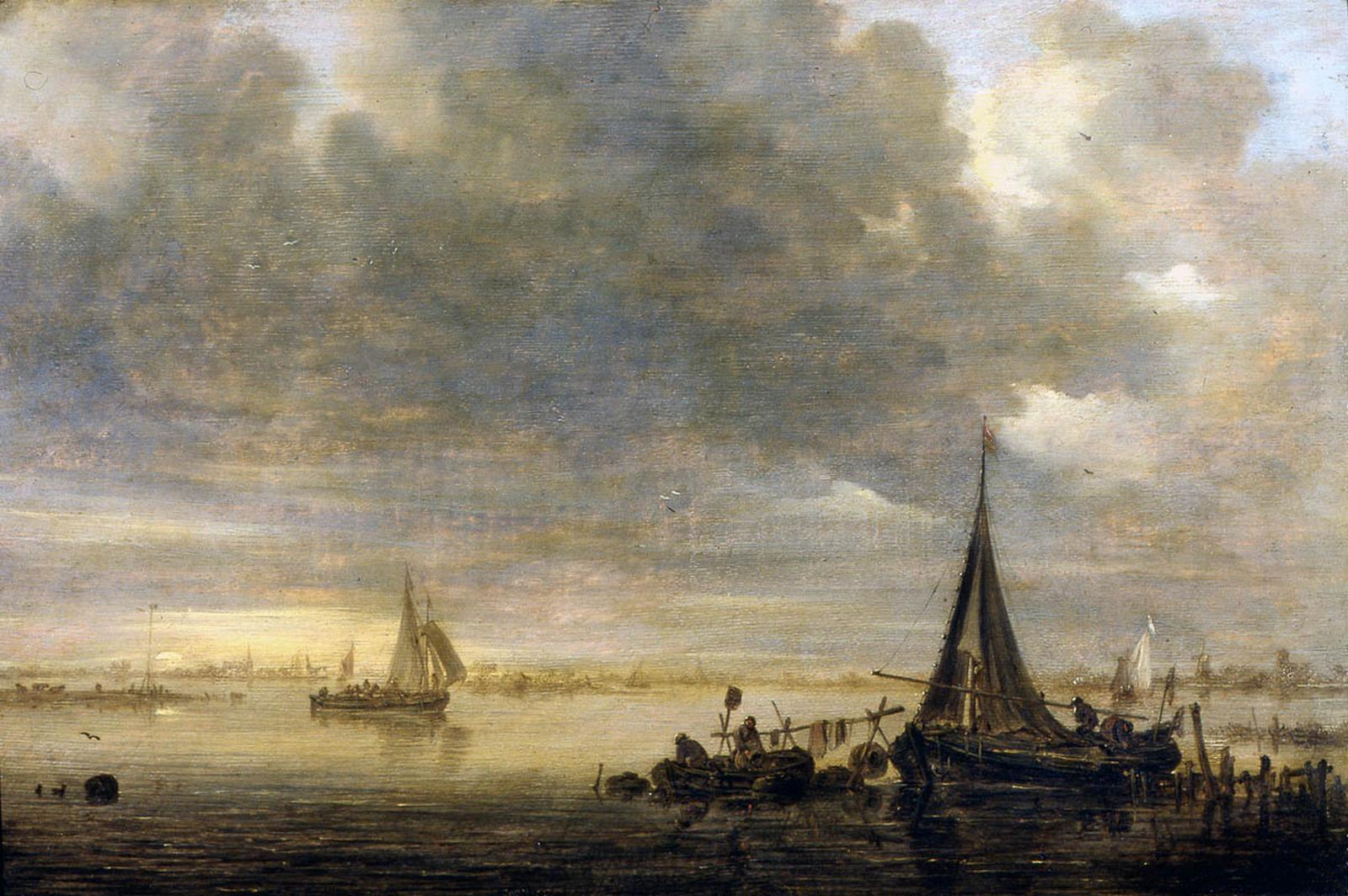
An Evening River Landscape with a Ferry (1643)

Typically, a Dutch painter of the 17th century will fall into one of four categories: a painter of portraits, landscapes, still-lifes, or genre painting. Dutch painting was highly specialized and rarely could an artist hope to achieve greatness in more than one area in a lifetime of painting. Jan van Goyen would be classified primarily as a landscape artist with an eye for the genre subjects of everyday life. He painted many of the canals in and around The Hague as well as the villages surrounding the countryside of Delft, Rotterdam, Leiden, and Gouda. Other popular Dutch landscape painters of the sixteenth and seventeenth century were Jacob van Ruisdael, Aelbert Cuyp, Hendrick Avercamp, Ludolf Backhuysen, Meindert Hobbema, Aert van der Neer.

== Van Goyen's technique ==
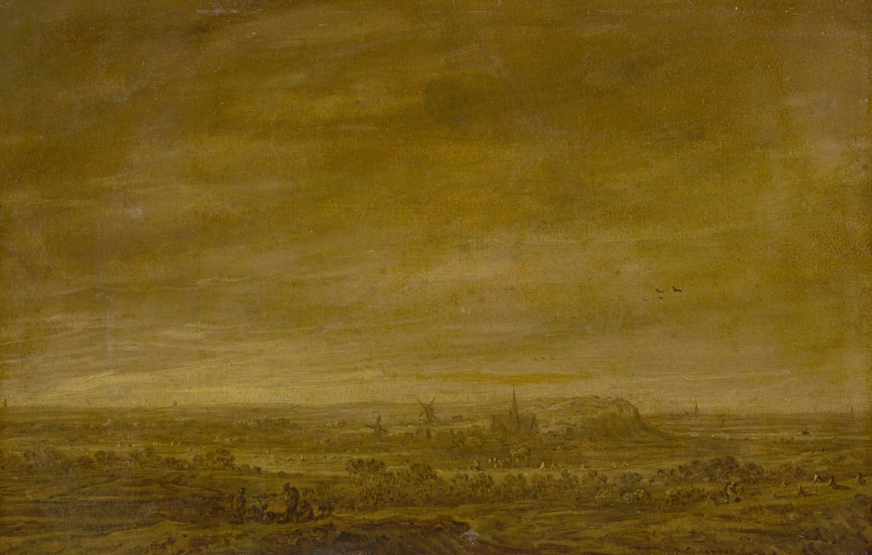
Wageningen (1650), oil on paper, 24.6 x 39.9 cm., Museum der bildenden Künste

Jan van Goyen would begin a painting using a support primarily of thin oak wood. To this panel, he would scrub on several layers of a thin animal hide glue. With a blade, he would then scrape over the entire surface a thin layer of tinted white lead to act as a ground and to fill the low areas of the panel. The ground was tinted light brown, sometimes reddish, or ochre in colour.

Next, van Goyen would loosely and very rapidly sketch out the scene to be painted with pen and ink without going into the small details of his subject. This walnut ink drawing can be clearly seen in some of the thinly painted areas of his work. For a guide, he would have turned to a detailed drawing. The scene would have been drawn from life outdoors and then kept in the studio as reference material. Drawings by artists of the time were rarely works of art in their own right as they are viewed today.

On his palette he would grind out a colour collection of neutral grays, umbers, ochre and earthen greens that looked like they were pulled from the very soil he painted. A varnish oil medium was used as vehicle to grind his powdered pigments into paint and then used to help apply thin layers of paint which he could easily blend.

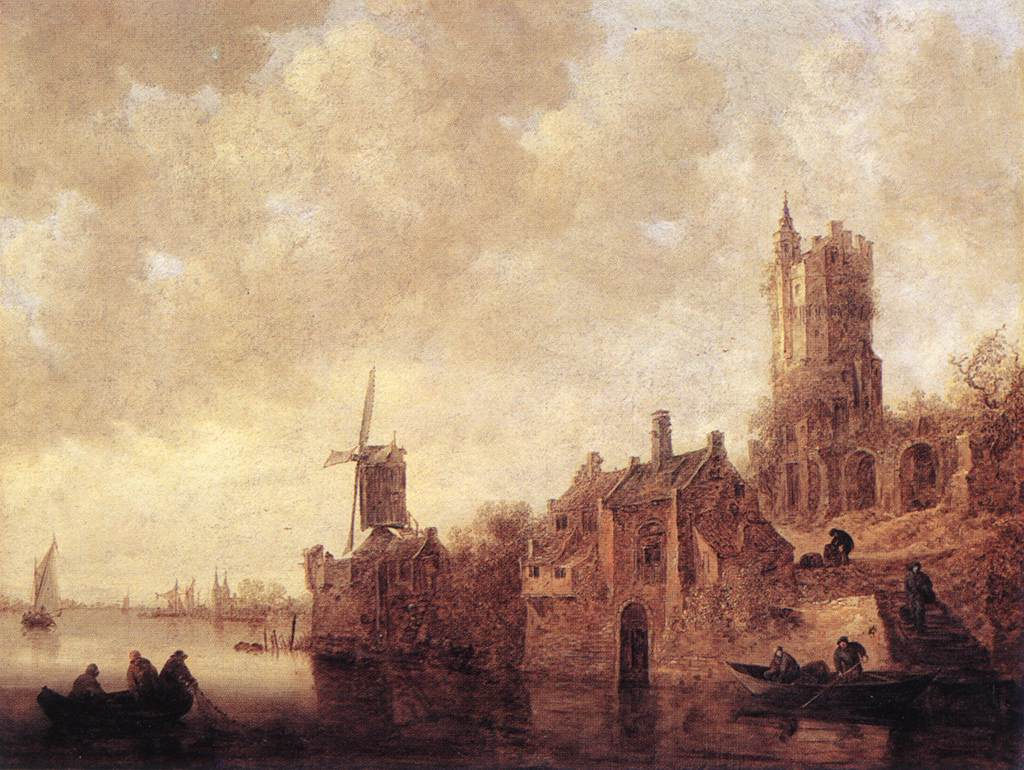
River Landscape with Windmill and Ruined Castle (1644), oil on canvas, 97 x 133.5 cm., Louvre

The dark areas of the painting were kept very thin and transparent with generous amounts of the oil medium. The light striking the painting in these sections would be lost and absorbed into the painting ground. The lighter areas of the picture were treated heavier and opaque with a generous amount of white lead mixed into the paint. Light falling on the painting in a light section is reflected back at the viewer. The effect is a startling realism and three-dimensional quality. The surface of a finished painting resembles a fluid supple mousse, masterfully whipped and modeled with the brush.

According to the art historian H. U. Beck, "In his freely composed seascapes of the 1650s he reached the apex of his creative work, producing paintings of striking perfection."

Some of Van Goyen's Works can be seen at the Thyssen Bornemisza Museum in Madrid, one from the public collection (Winter landscape with figures on ice, 1643) and others from the Carmen Thyssen Collection also shown there (River Landscape with Ferry boat and Cottages, 1634).

== Legacy ==
Jan van Goyen was famously influential on the landscape painters of his century. His tonal quality was a feature that many imitated. According to the Netherlands Institute for Art History, he influenced Cornelis de Bie, Jan Coelenbier, Cornelis van Noorde, Abraham Susenier, Herman Saftleven, Pieter Jansz van Asch, and Abraham van Beijeren.

Van Goyen is mentioned by his fellow countryman Vincent van Gogh in Vincent's second letter from the asylum: "Through the iron-barred window I can make out a square of wheat in an enclosure, a perspective in the manner of Van Goyen, above which in the morning I see the sun rise in its glory."

In 1833 the British artist J.M.W. Turner paid tribute with his painting Van Goyen Looking Out for a Subject.

== Gallery ==
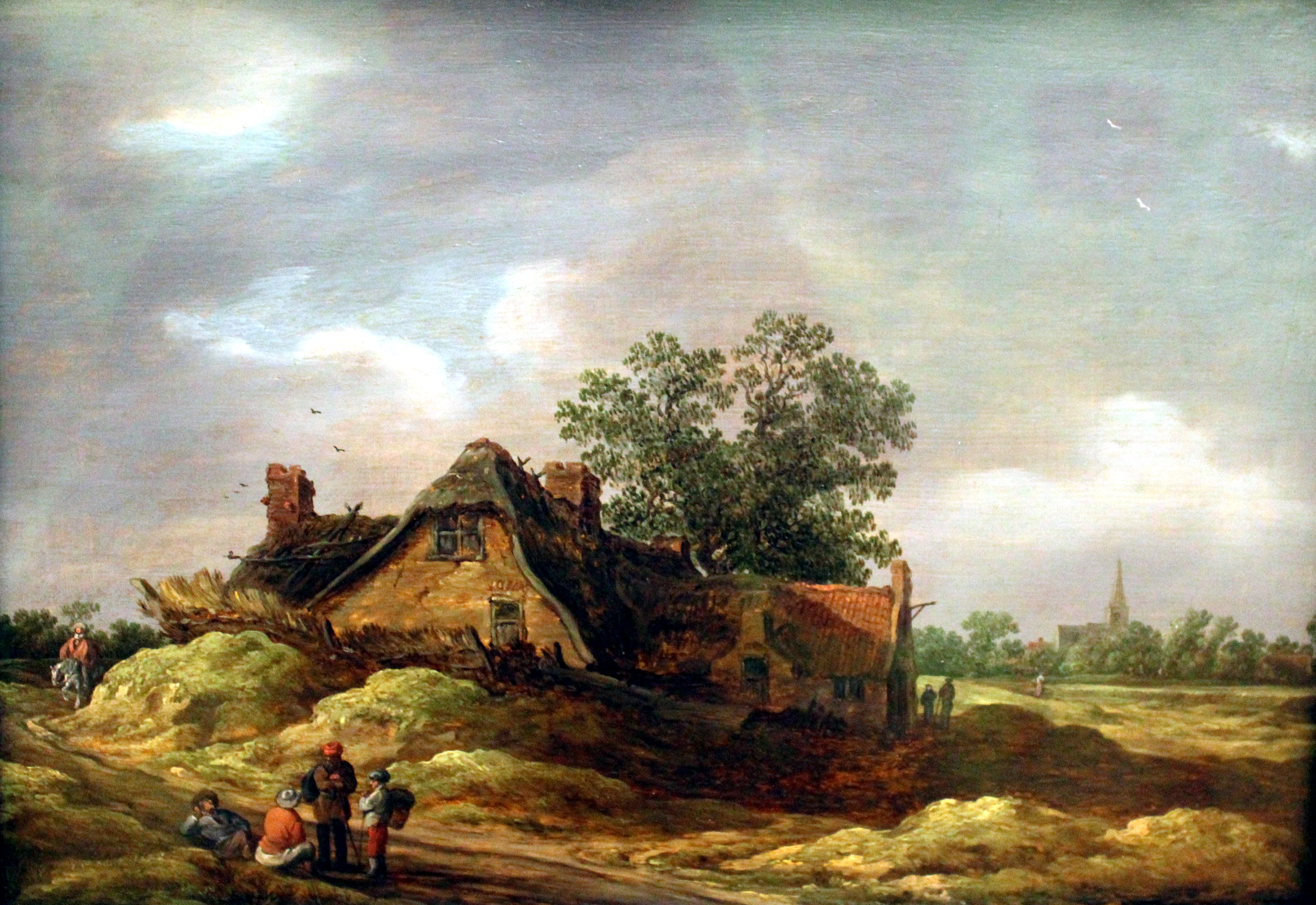
Farmhouse (1628), oil on panel, 27.5 x 37.5 cm., Museum der bildenden Künste

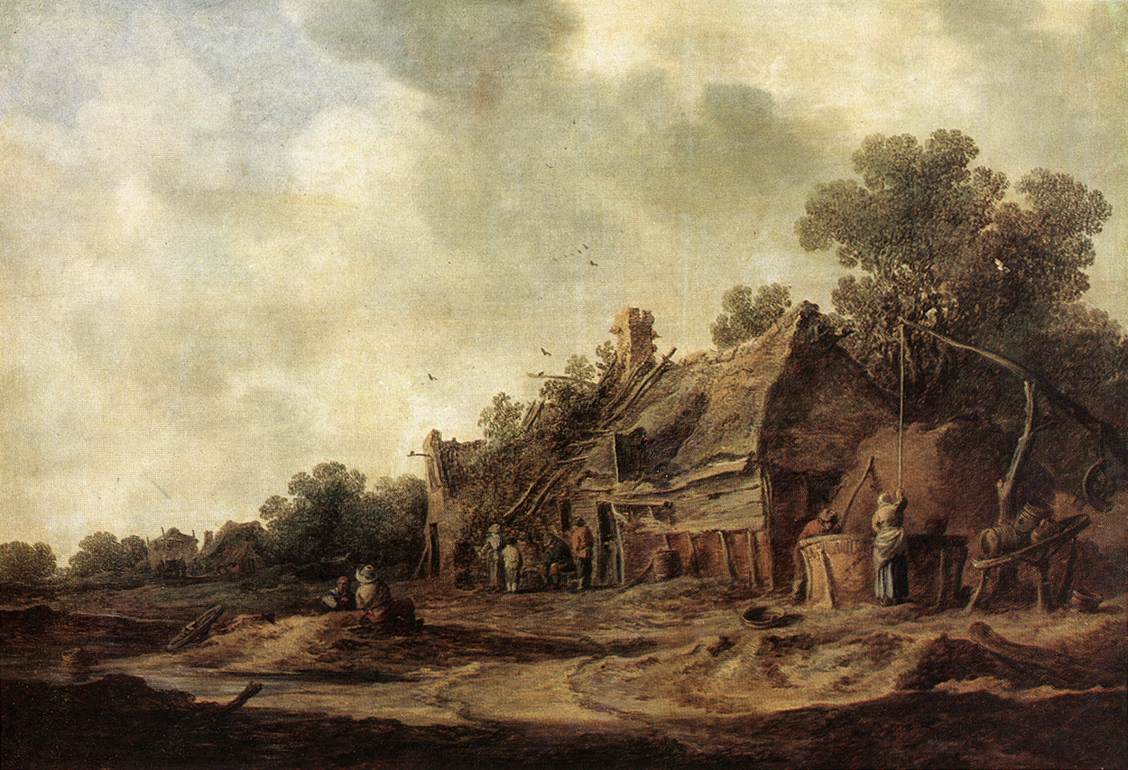
Peasant Huts with a Sweep Well (1633), oil on panel, 55 x 80 cm., Gemäldegalerie Alte Meister

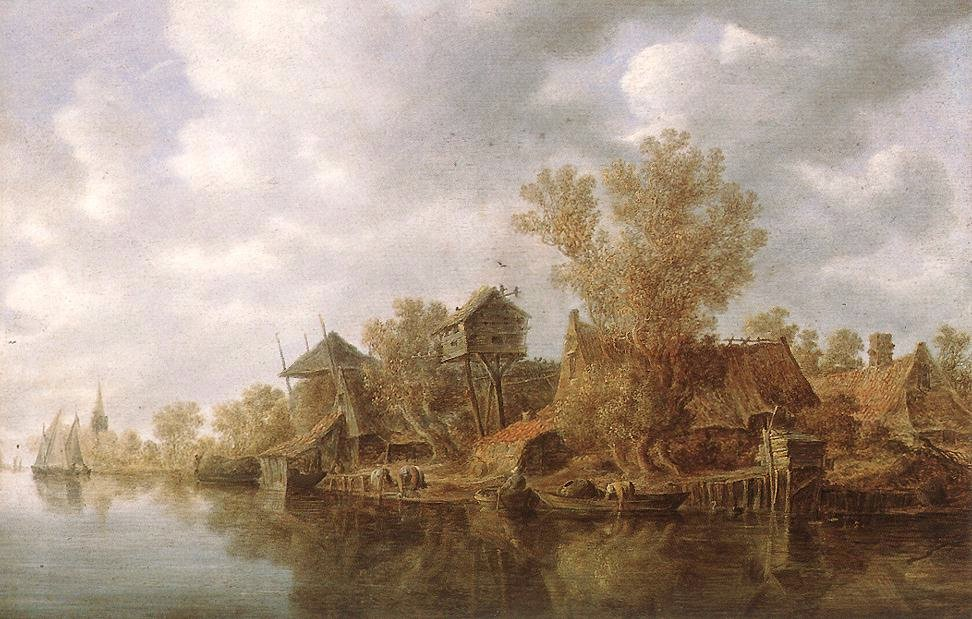
Village at the River (1636), oil on panel, 39,5 x 60 cm., Alte Pinakothek

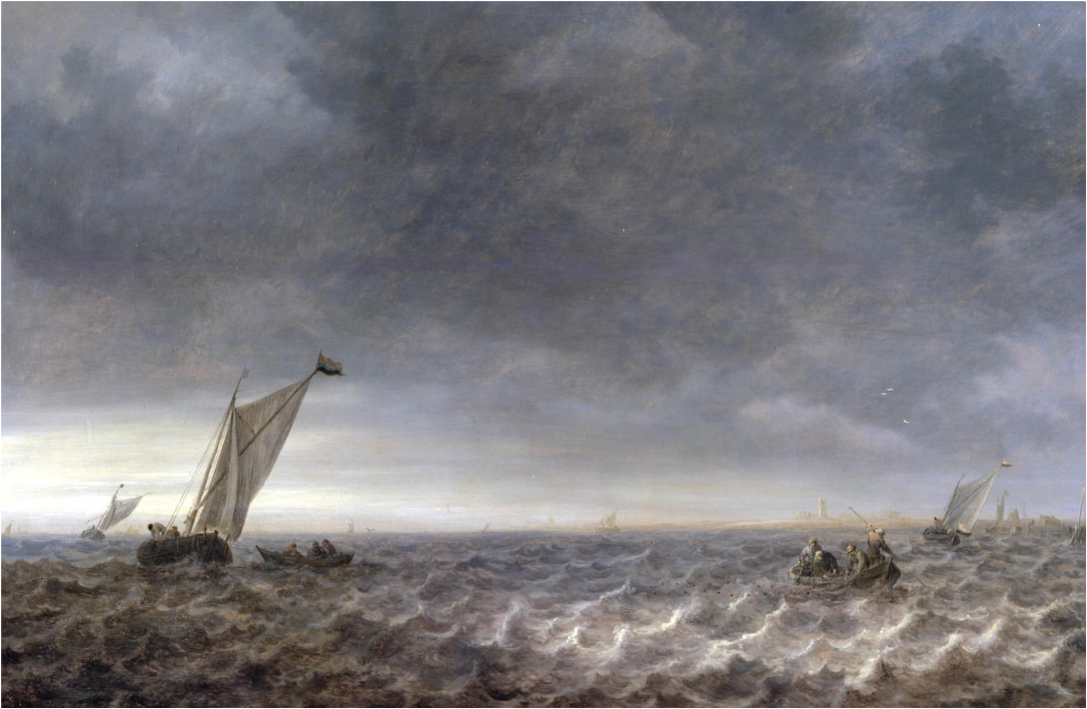
Sailing and Row boats in an Estuary (1640), oil on panel, 77 x 116 cm., Museum De Lakenhal

Landscape with a Rainbow (no date), oil on canvas, 124.5 x 154.5 cm., Hallwyl Museum

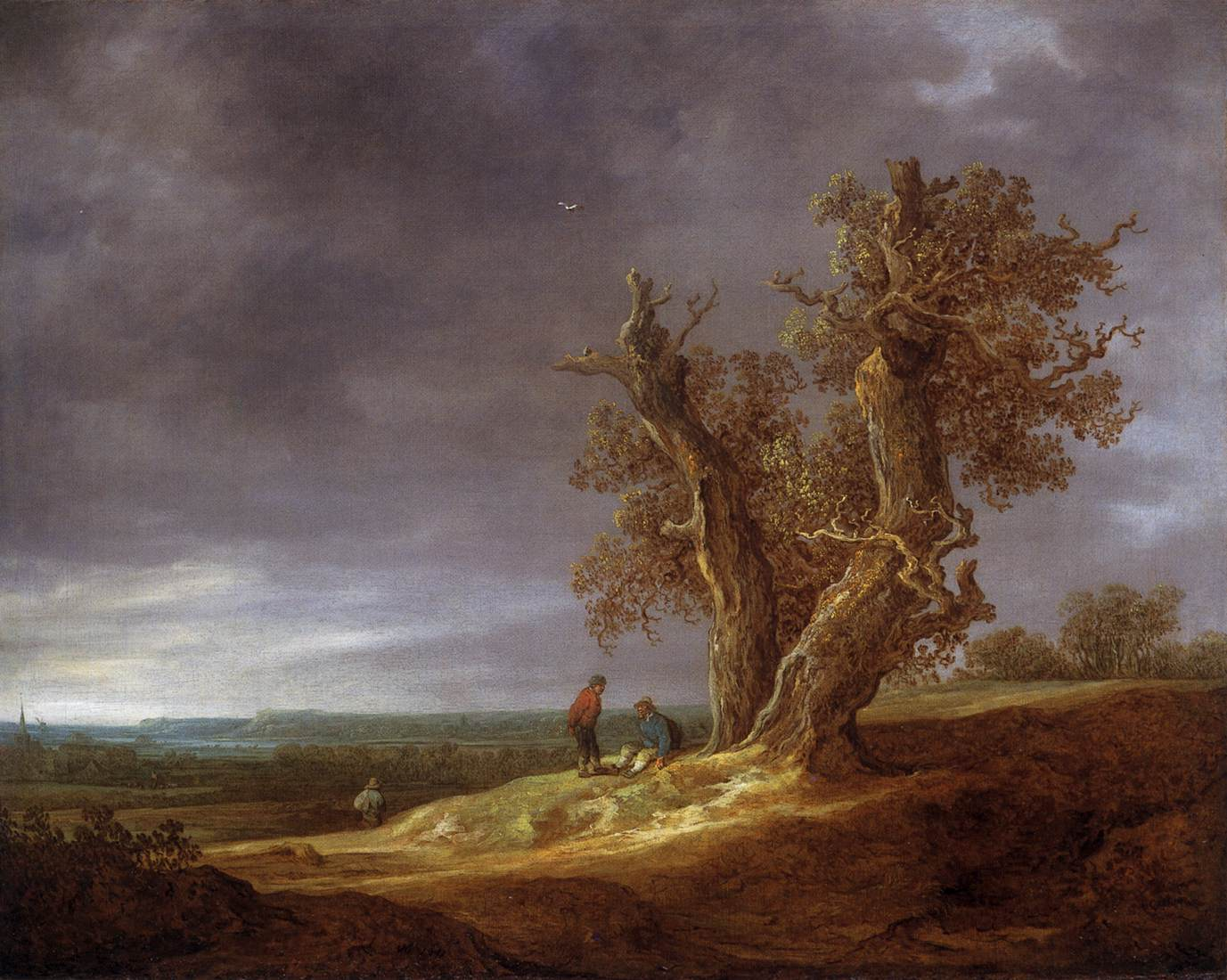
Landscape with Two Oaks (1641), oil on canvas, 88.5 x 110.5 cm., Rijksmuseum

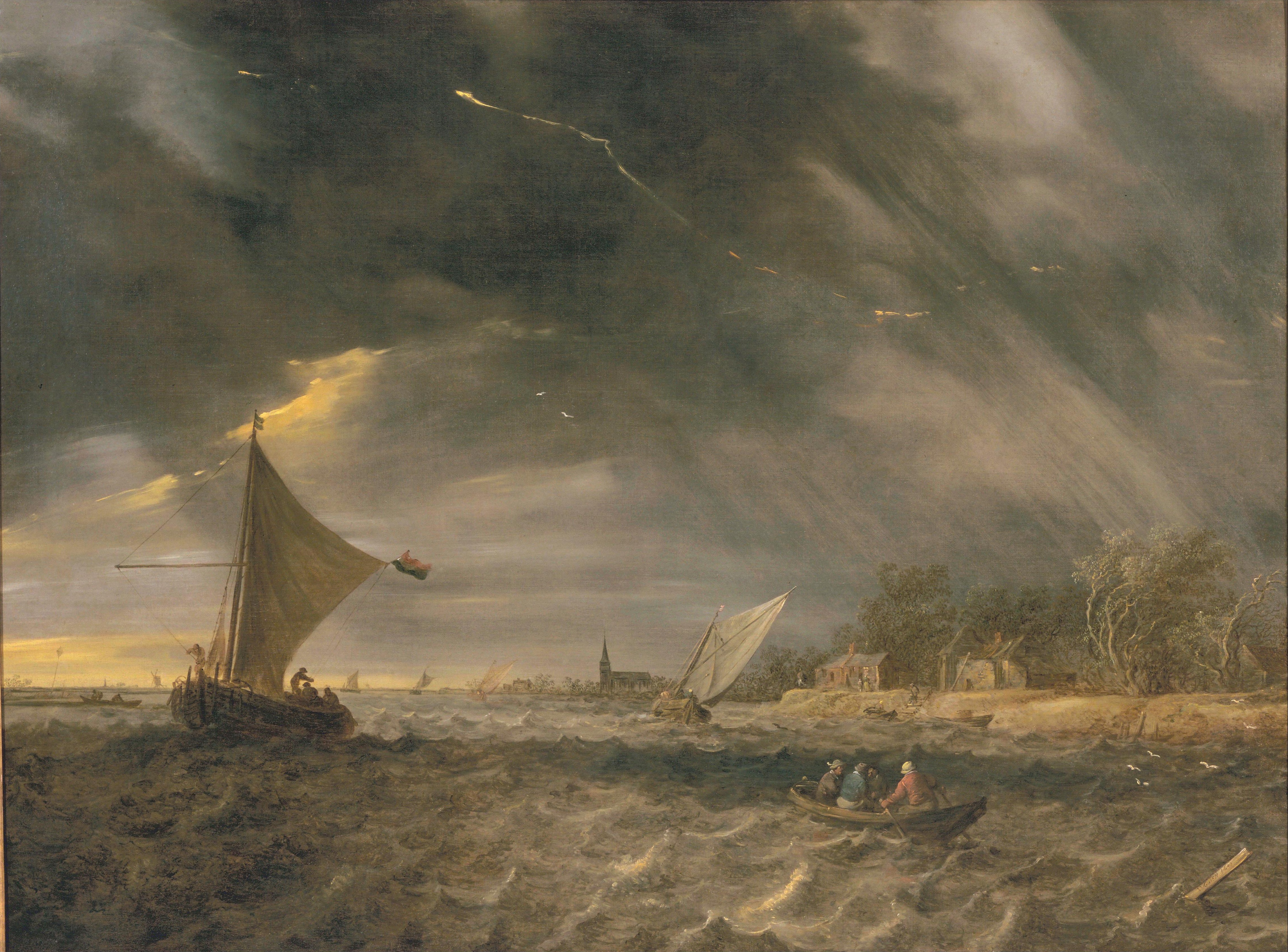
The Thunderstorm (1641), oil on canvas, 137.8 x 183.2 cm., Fine Arts Museums of San Francisco

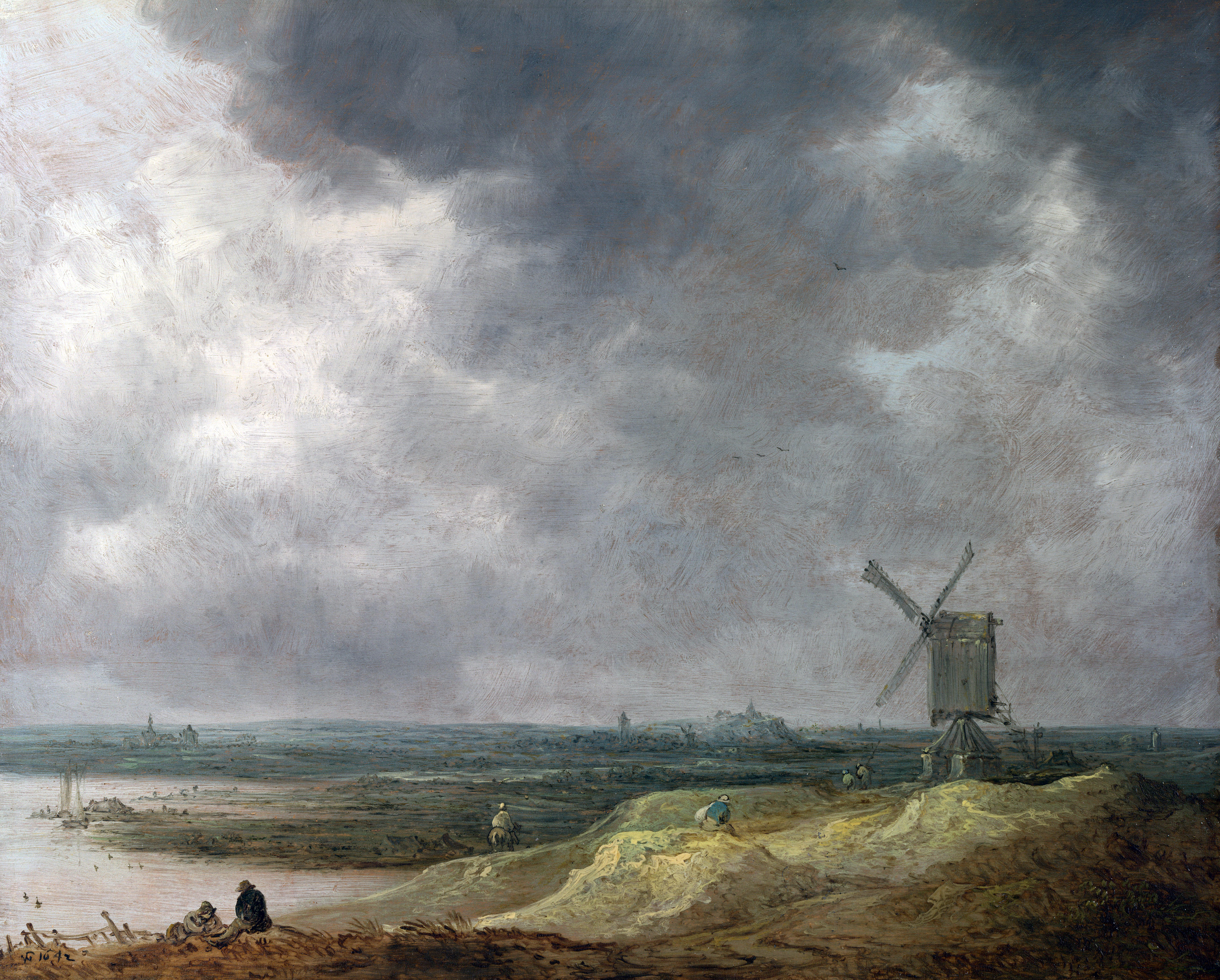
A Windmill by a River (1642), oil on panel, 29,4 x 36,3 cm., National Gallery

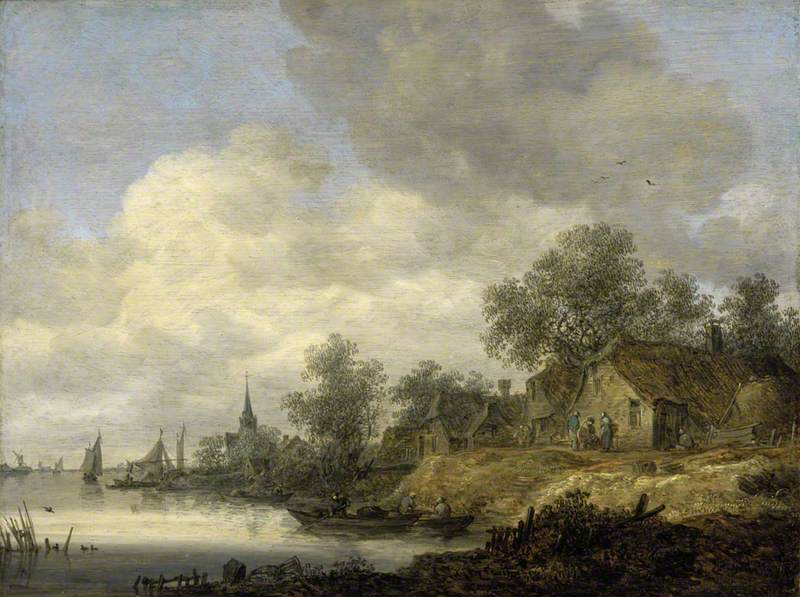
A River Scene (1646), oil on panel, 42.6 x 56.5 cm., National Galleries of Scotland

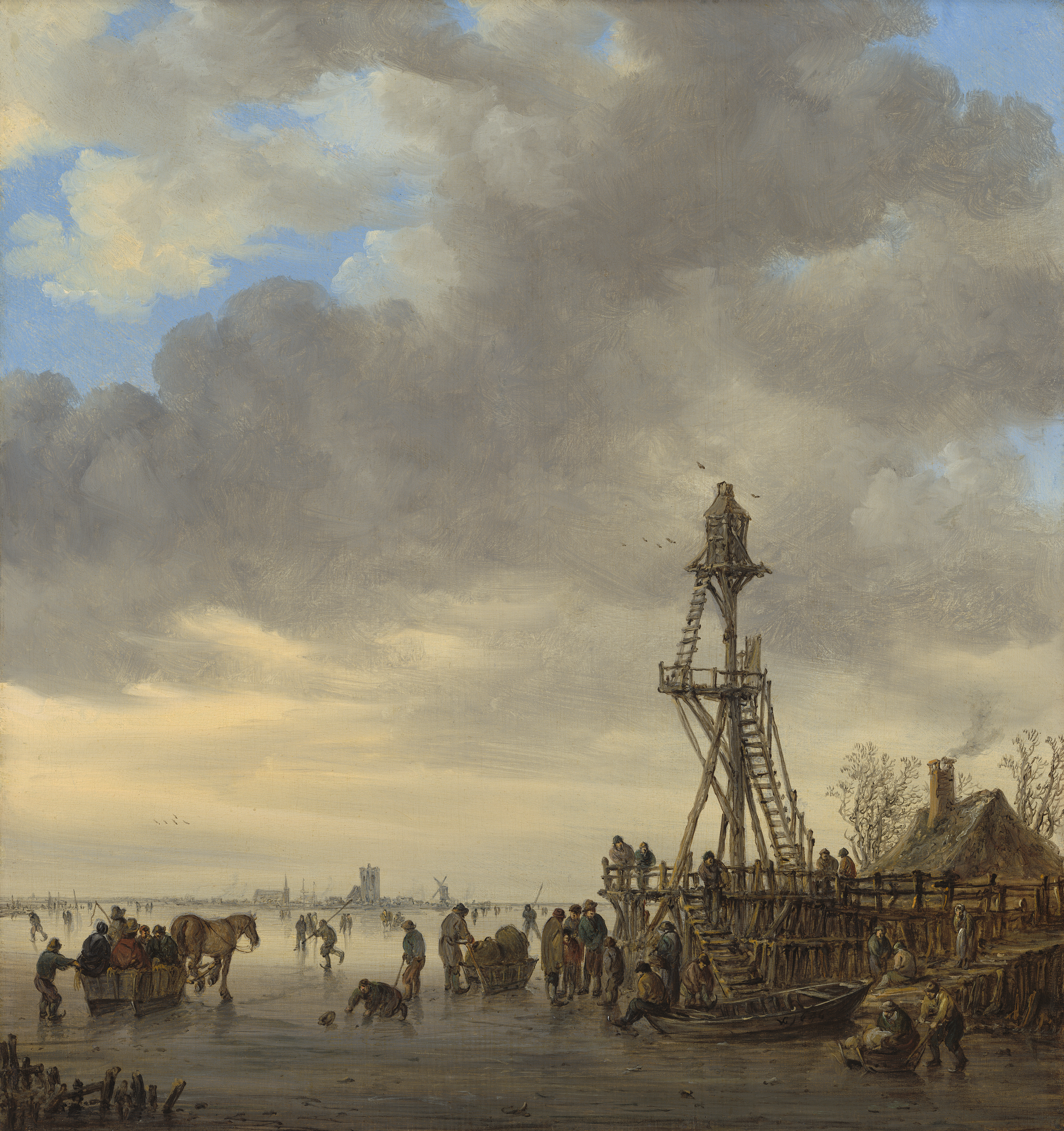
Ice Scene near a Wooden Observation Tower (1646), oil on panel, 36.5 × 34.3 cm., National Gallery of Art

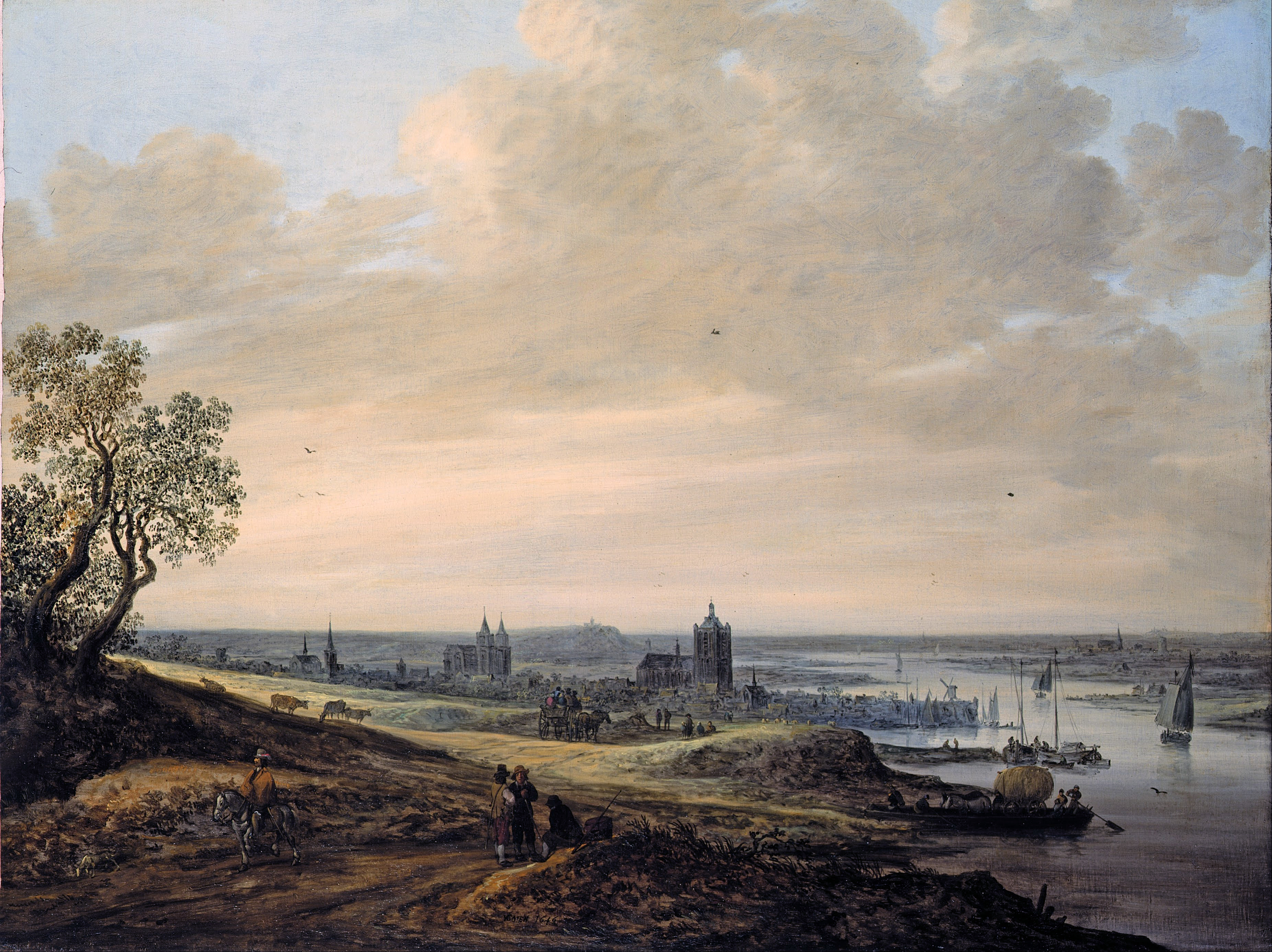
Panorama Landscape with a View of Arnhem (1646), oil on canvas, 98.5 x 135 cm., Museum Kunstpalast

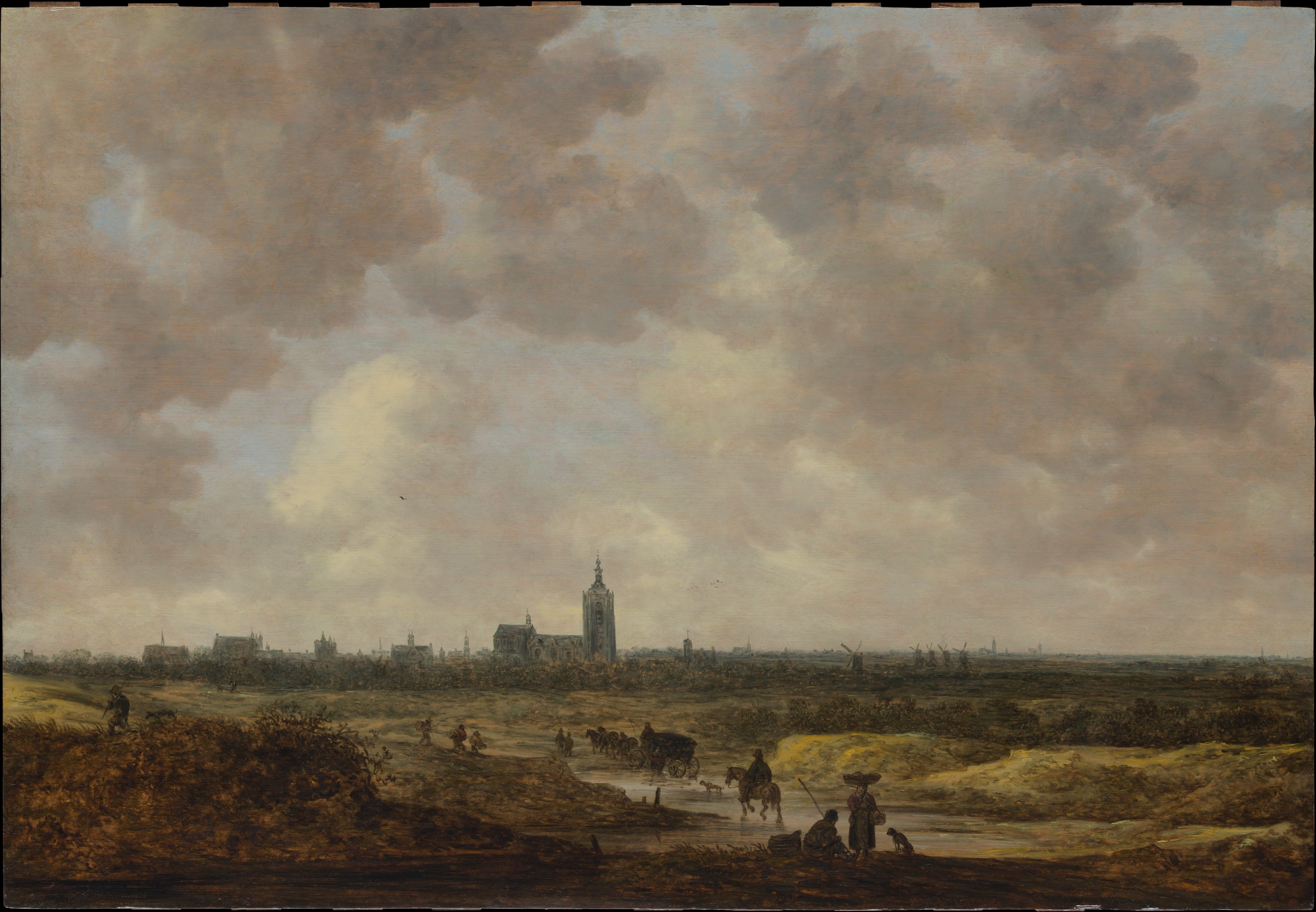
View of The Hague from the Northwest (1647), oil on panel, 66 x 96.2 cm., Metropolitan Museum of Art

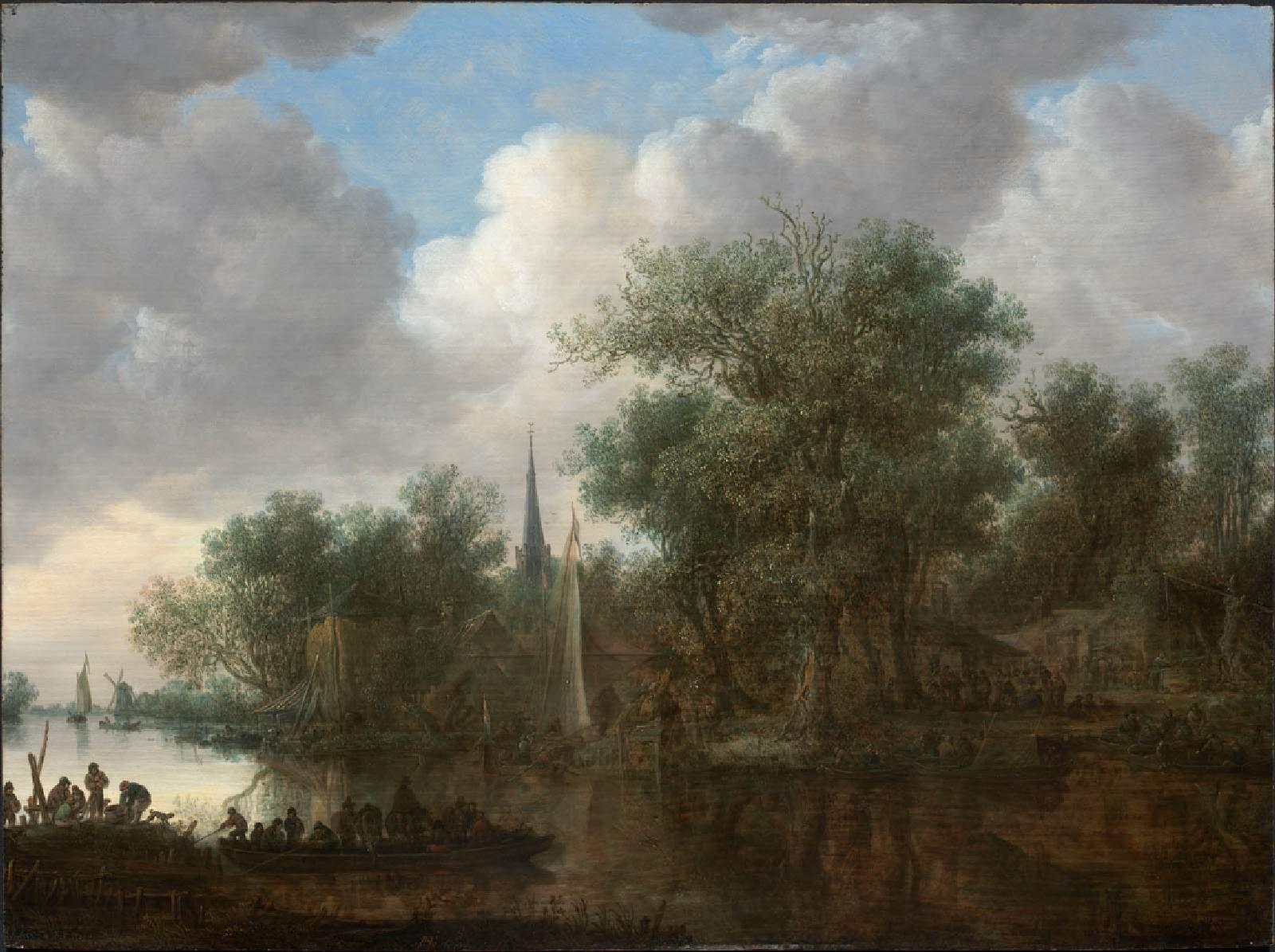
River Landscape with Boats and Cottages on the Bank (1648), oil on panel, 54 x 73.7 cm., Museum of Fine Arts, Boston

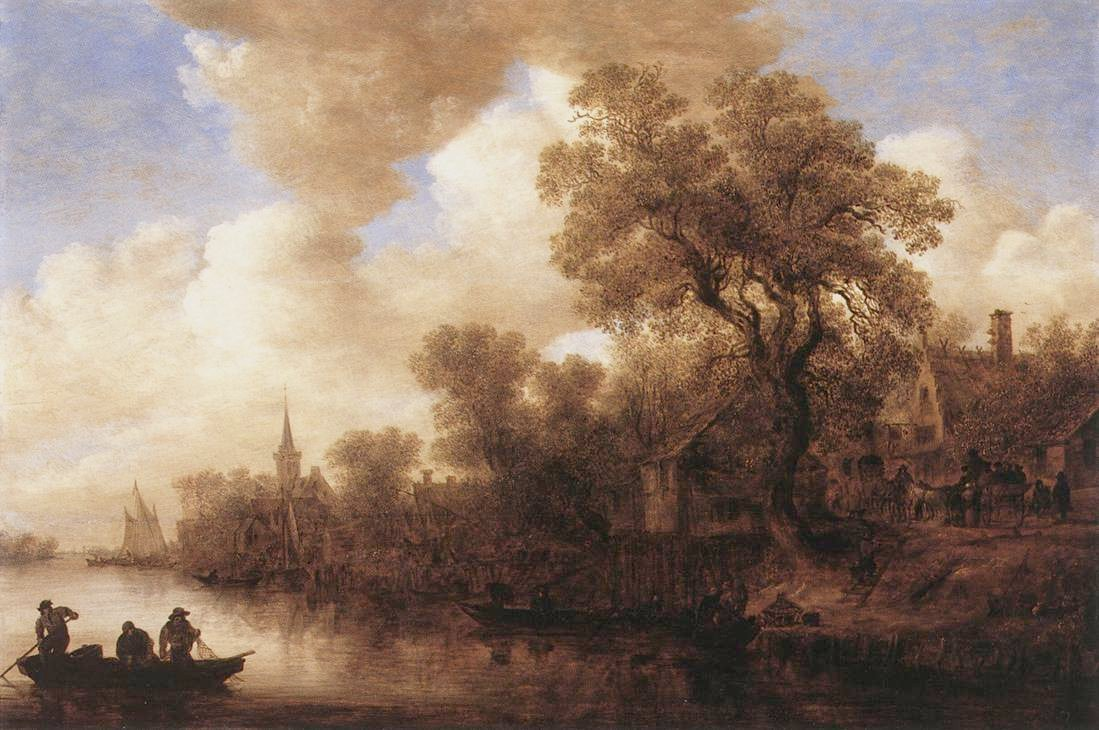
River Landscape (1652), oil on panel, 66.7 x 98 cm., Wallraf–Richartz Museum

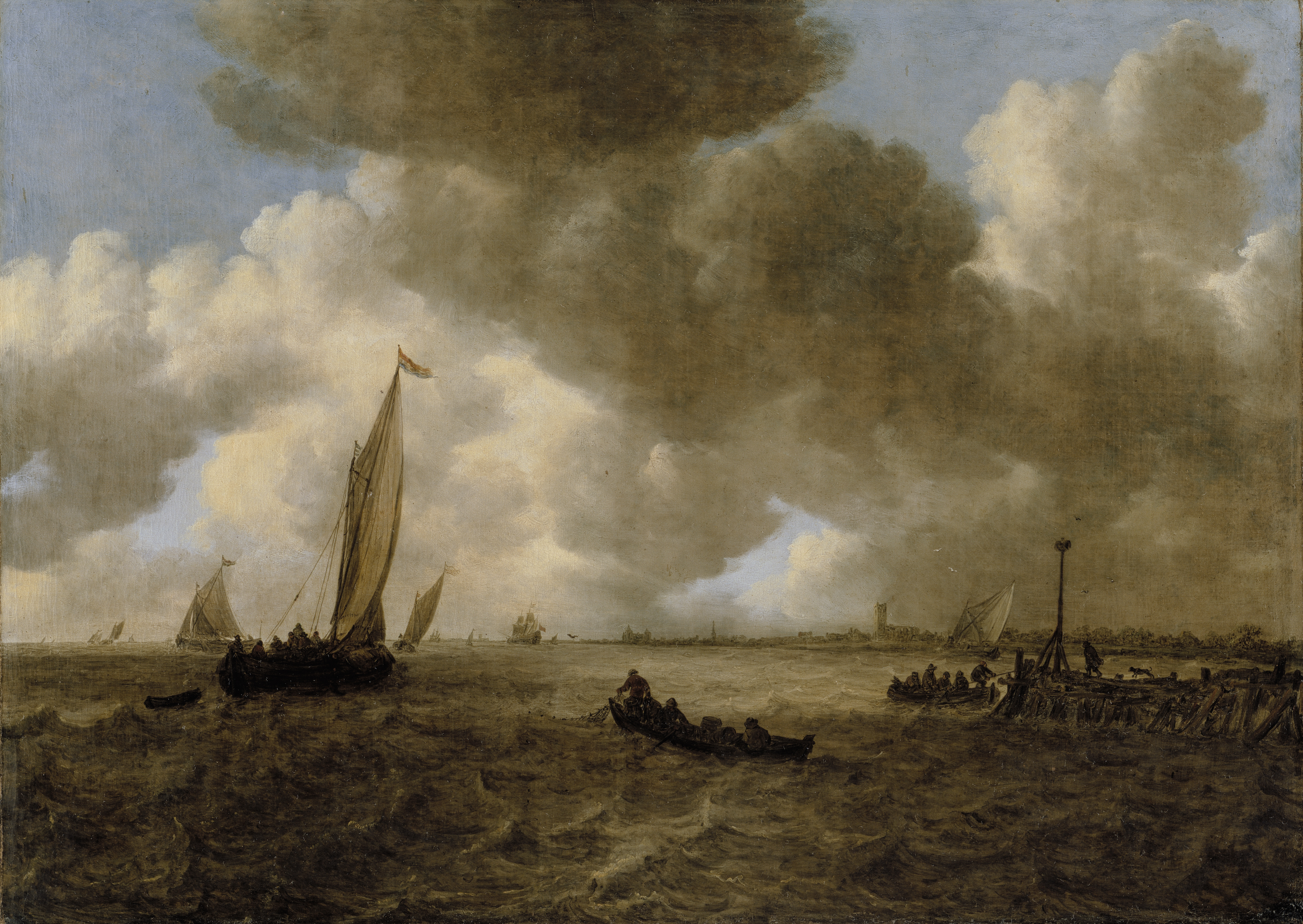
A Stormy Seascape (1655), oil on canvas, 110 × 159 cm., Sinebrychoff Art Museum

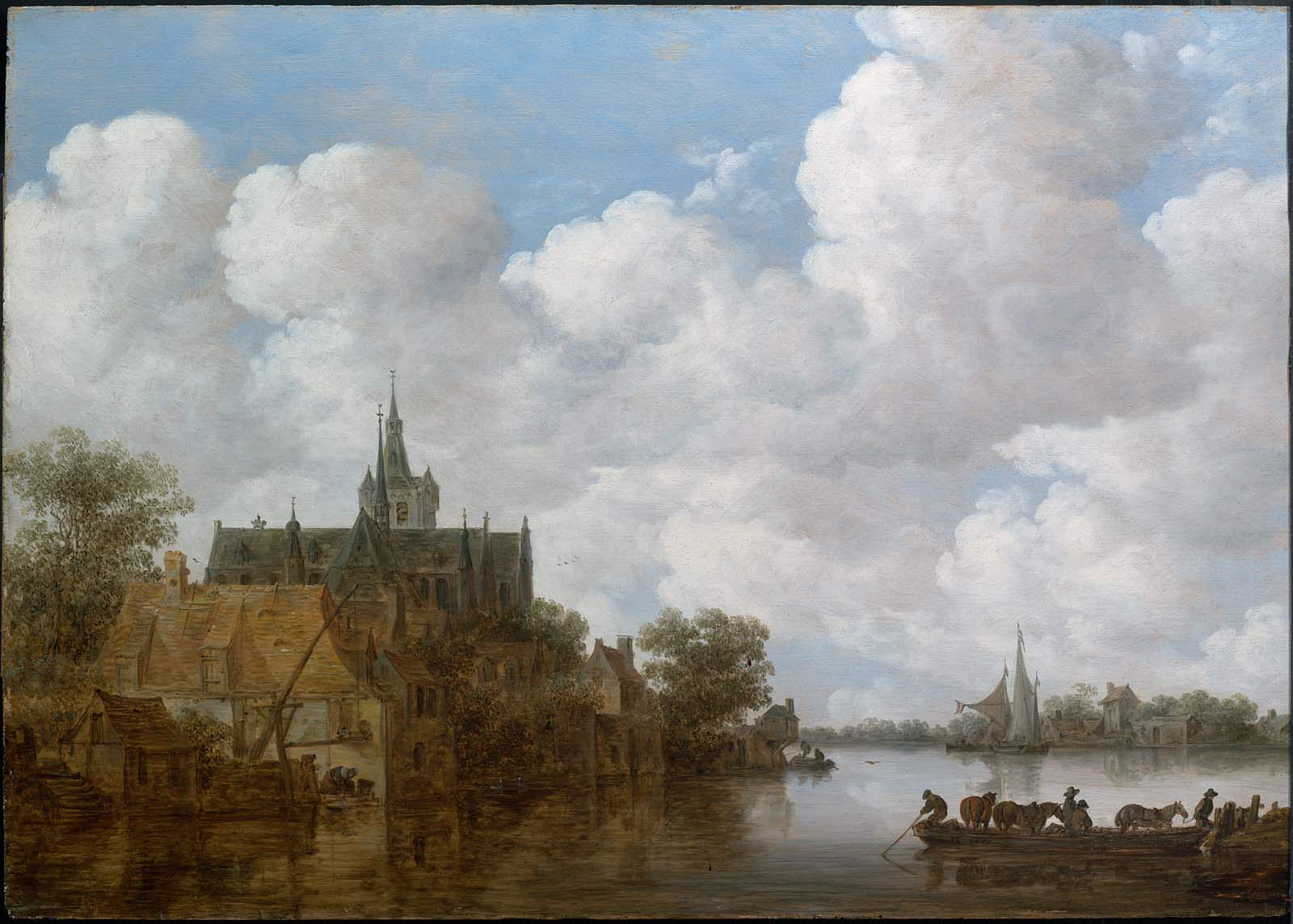
River Landscape with a Ferry and a Church (ca. 1656), oil on panel, 47.3 x 66.7 cm., Museum of Fine Arts, Boston
