= Leiden Guild of St. Luke =

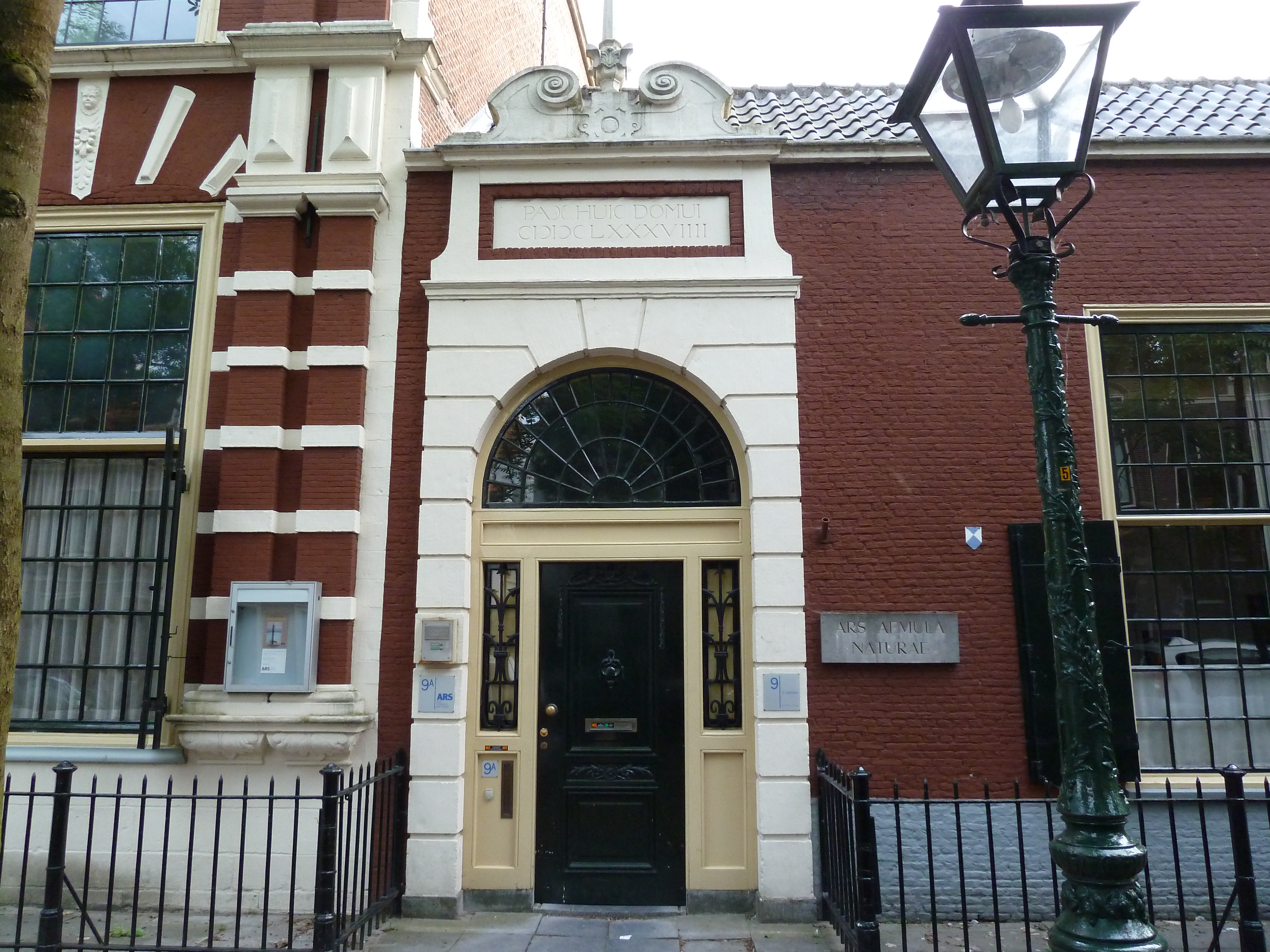
Entrance gate (from 1689) to Pieterskerkgracht 9, the location of Ars Aemula Naturae since 1859

The Leiden Guild of Saint Luke refers to three artist collectives in Leiden; the Leidsche St. Lucas Gilde dating from 1648, the newer Leidse Tekenacademie established in 1694, and the collective known as Ars Aemula Naturae (art competes with nature) established in 1799.

== History ==
Like other Dutch cities, Leiden required membership in the guilds in order to sell wares falling under those guilds. In the Middle Ages, Lucas van Leyden had kept a workshop that was more or less seen as a guild. Leiden in the Middle Ages was a small city in the Northern Netherlands, smaller than Gouda or Haarlem. Leiden seems to have not had a specific guild for painters prior to March 10, 1648, when Gerard Dou and Abraham Lambertsz van den Tempel signed a charter and founded the Leidse Sint Lucasgilde with his colleagues Gabriel Metsu, Jan Steen, Joris van Schooten, David Bailly and Pieter de Ring. This collective was for trades connected to the art industry. After the change of governance that the siege of Leiden caused, Joris van Schooten issued his first proposal to the city council for a St. Luke Guild in 1609 and again in 1610. His petitions were refused for being too Catholic. Previously, the Leiden artists had been unified in the workshop of the Leiden councilman Isaac Nicolai. Later collectives were founded as a Leiden-based art academy along the lines of the Confrerie Pictura in The Hague.

In 1694, Willem van Mieris, Carel de Moor and Jacob Toorenvliet began a true drawing academy with evening classes for artists where they could draw from live models.

== Ars Aemula Naturae ==
Guilds were disbanded during the French occupation, so the collective became a society and in 1799 the name changed to Ars Aemula Naturae, which still exists today. The society meets in an old building on Pieterskerkgracht 9 since 1859. The building is a rijksmonument and contains some rare paintings on the ceiling by one of the earliest guild members, Martin Zaagmolen.

== Other guild members registered in Leiden ==
- Abraham Begeyn
- Evert Collier
- Cornelis Liefrinck
- Matthijs Naiveu
- Ary de Vois
- Roelof Jansz van Vries
