= Pezzoli =

Pezzoli may refer to:

- Pezzoli (surname)

== Places ==
- Pezzoli, a frazione of the municipality of Ceregnano, in the Province of Rovigo, Veneto, Italy
- Pezzoli, a frazione of the municipality of Treviglio, in the Province of Bergamo, Lombardy, Italy
- Museo Poldi Pezzoli, an art museum in Milan, Italy
- Poldi Pezzoli Madonna or Madonna with the Sleeping Christ Child, a tempera on canvas painting by Andrea Mantegna
