= Charger (table setting) =

Dish that other dishes are placed upon

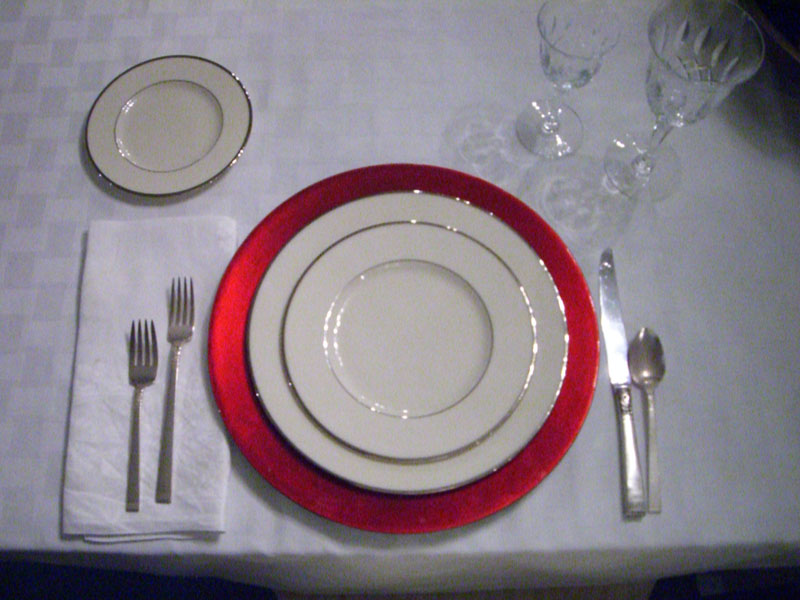
Place setting with red charger.

Charger plates or service plates are large plates used at full-course dinners and/or to dress up special events like parties and weddings. Charger plates have been in use since the 19th century.

== North America ==
Food is not actually served on chargers; they are often called underplates or chop plates. The word "charger" originated around 1275–1325 from the Middle English "chargeour", coming itself from the Latin word carricare, meaning “to load". Formerly, a charger signified either a large platter or a large, shallow dish for liquids.

They are usually larger than most common dinner plates. Since they are not used for food, charger plates can be found in a variety of materials, from traditional china to metal, wood, glass, plastic, and pearl, and they may be decorated with substances that can be toxic if ingested.

Charger plate etiquette and use vary. Some professional catering companies remove the decorative charger plate as soon as the guests are seated. In other instances, when the design of charger plates complements the design of dining plates, charger plates are left on the table throughout the course of the meal. Charger plates are always removed before serving desserts.

== Europe ==
In service à la russe, charger plates are called service plates and are kept on the table during the initial courses. Service plates thus act as a base for soup bowls and salad plates. After the soup course is finished, both the soup bowl and service plate are removed from the table; a heated plate is put in their place. The fish and meat courses are served from platters. (This was not the case historically, nor is it often followed in restaurants.) Directly before dessert, everything is removed from the place settings except the wine and water glasses and crumbs are cleared. The rule is as such: a filled plate is always replaced with an empty one, and no place goes without a plate until just before the dessert course.

== Culture ==
In the King James Bible, Mark 6:22–25 and Matthew 14:6–8 tell of a "daughter of Herodias" who requested John the Baptist's head in a "charger" from Herod Antipas as her reward for dancing at his birthday party. It was the subject of a painting by artist Andrea Solari.

== See also ==
- Dress code
- Table setting
