= Butler Madonna =

1460 painting by Andrea Mantegna

The Butler Madonna
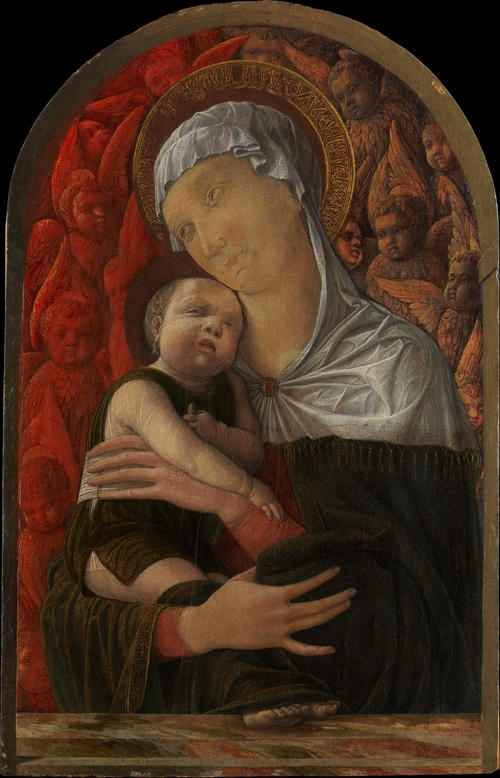
- Artist: Andrea Mantegna
- Year: 1460
- Medium: tempera on panel
- Dimensions: 44,1 cm × 28,6 cm (174 in × 113 in)
- Location: Metropolitan Museum of Art, New York

The Butler Madonna or Madonna and Child with Cherubim and Seraphim is a tempera painting on panel measuring 44.1 by 28.6 cm. It is attributed to Andrea Mantegna, dated to around 1460. Its poor conservation, including over-harsh restoration to Mary's face, means that some art historians cannot accept it as an autograph work and theorise that it was produced by a follower of Mantegna after an autograph original. Its provenance is unknown before 1891, when it appeared for sale at a London art dealer. It was purchased by Charles Butler, from whom it passed to the Metropolitan Museum of Art in New York in 1926, where it still hangs.

If it is an autograph work, it dates from after Mantegna's trip to Rome and some attribute it to the end of his Paduan period (c. 1460), suggested by comparison with the Presentation at the Temple, which has similar fictive marble frame in the foreground. It belongs to a group of small-format Madonnas produced by Mantegna for private devotion - others include Madonna with Sleeping Child (Berlin), the Poldi Pezzoli Madonna and the Bergamo Madonna. The cherubim are in blue and the seraphim in red, whilst the painter has drawn on Donatello's example in showing Mary incline her face towards her son.
