= Michael Friedsam =

American philanthropist and art collector (1860–1931)

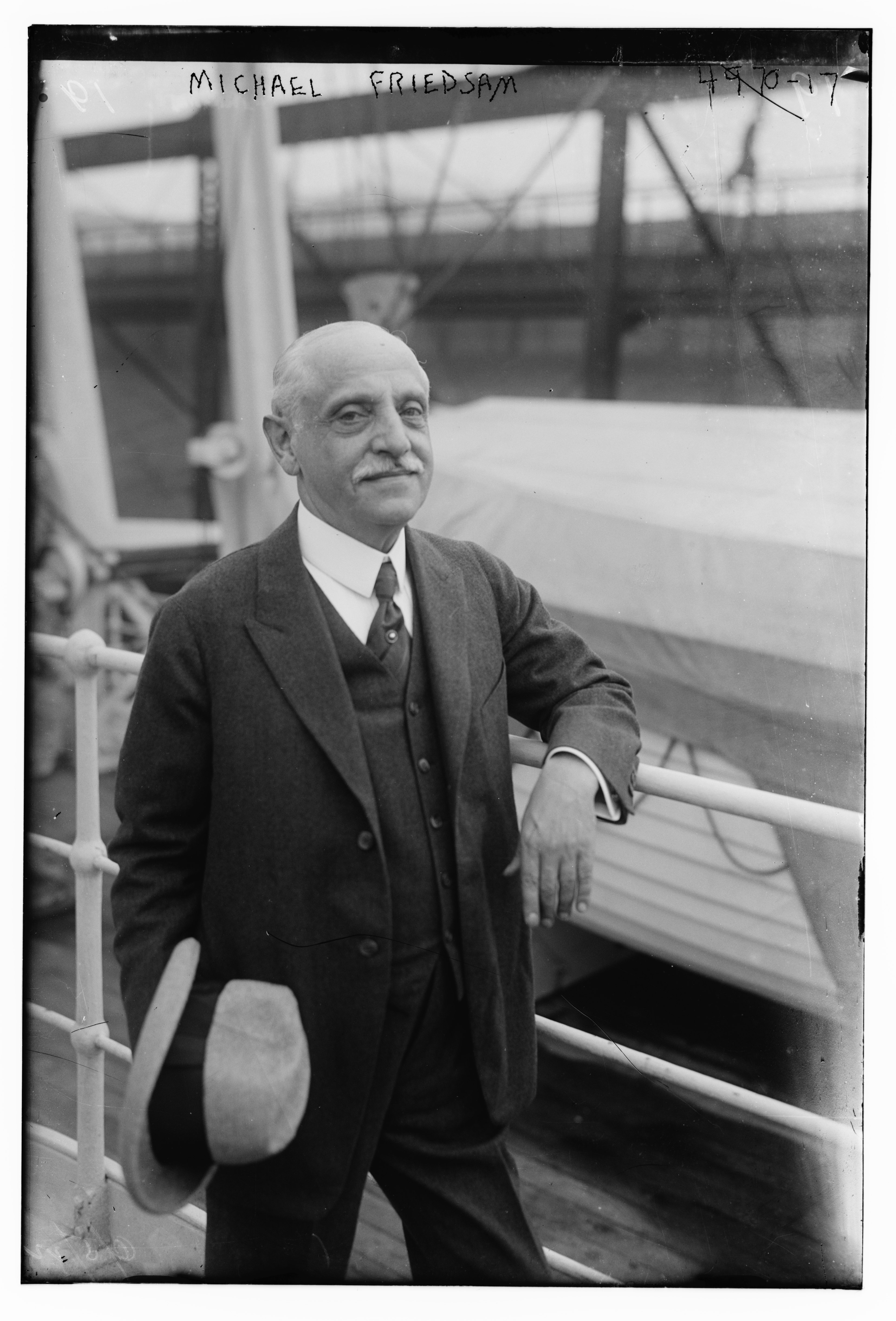
- Born: 1860
- Died: 1931 (aged 70–71)
- Occupations: Businessman, art collector
- Known for: President of B. Altman and Company, art collection bequests

Col. Michael Friedsam (1860–1931) was an American philanthropist of New York City. Friedsam was the former president of B. Altman and Company and one of the premier art collectors in America at that time.

== Residence ==
The Friedsam residence at 44 East 68th Street was built in 1921. The five-story limestone building was designed by Frederick Frost, with wrought ironwork by Samuel Yellin, and carved marble fireplaces, stained glass windows, and ornate woodwork. Following Friedsam's death in 1931, the residence was converted into Dominican Academy, a Catholic high school for girls.

== Art collection ==
Friedsam's collection contained numerous masterpieces by artists such as Vermeer, Rembrandt, Jan Van Eyck, and Botticelli.

=== Bequests and legacy ===
Friedsam never married and left his estate valued at $20 million ($500 million in 2025) to charities and public bequests. A large part of his collection was bequeathed to the Metropolitan Museum of Art (then valued at $2.5 million; $60 million in 2025), and another part to the Brooklyn Museum of Art (then valued at $130,000).

However, modern authentication techniques have revealed that about a quarter of the 926 works Friedsam donated to the Brooklyn Museum are fakes. Today, the Brooklyn Museum would like to divest some of the works, but is restricted by the bequest.

=== Selected works from Metropolitan Museum bequest ===
The list of paintings from the Met bequest still in the collection are:

Image	Title	Painter	Date	Accession number	The Met URL
	A Peasant Woman Picking Fleas off a Dog	Adriaen Brouwer		32.100.1	Met
	The Brawl	copy after Adriaen Brouwer	1700s	32.100.2	Met
	A Peasant with a Bird	Adriaen Brouwer		32.100.3	Met
	The Lacemaker	Nicolaes Maes	1656	32.100.5	Met
	Country House near the Water	Jan van Goyen	1646	32.100.6	Met
	Portrait of a Man	Spanish (Andalusian) Painter	1700s	32.100.7	Met
	Frans Hals (1582/83–1666)	Copy after Frans Hals	1560s	32.100.8	Met
	The Reader	Eglon van der Neer		32.100.9	Met
	A Young Woman in a Landscape	an anonymous Dutch painter	1636	32.100.10	Met
	Sports on a Frozen River	Aert van der Neer		32.100.11	Met
	Barnyard Scene	Anthonie van Borssom		32.100.12	Met
	Grainfields	Jacob van Ruisdael	1668	32.100.14	Met
	Woman with a Water Pitcher, and a Man by a Bed ("The Maidservant")	Pieter de Hooch	1667	32.100.15	Met
	Winter Scene	Style of Jan van de Cappelle	between c. 1690 – c. 1825	32.100.16	Met
	The Allegory of Faith	Johannes Vermeer	1670	32.100.18	Met
	Sentimental Conversation	Quirijn van Brekelenkam	1660s	32.100.19	Met
	Equestrian Portrait of Cornelis (1639–1680) and Michiel Pompe van Meerdervoort (1638–1653) with Their Tutor and Coachman ("Starting for the Hunt")	Aelbert Cuyp		32.100.20	Met
	The Smokers	Adriaen Brouwer		32.100.21	Met
	Bellona	Rembrandt	1633	32.100.23	Met
	Sebastian Andorfer (1469–1537)	Hans Maler zu Schwaz	1517	32.100.33	Met
	The Annunciation	Petrus Christus	c. 1445	32.100.35	Met
	Man Weighing Gold	Adriaen Isenbrandt		32.100.36	Met
	Frans Francken I (1542–1616)	Workshop of Peter Paul Rubens	1700s	32.100.37	Met
	The Annunciation	South Netherlandish Painter	1500s	32.100.38	Met
	The Nativity	South Netherlandish Painter	1460	32.100.39	Met
	The Nativity	Gerard David		32.100.40a	Met
	Saint John the Baptist; Saint Francis Receiving the Stigmata	Gerard David	1490s	32.100.40bc	Met
	A Donor Presented by a Saint	Circle of Dieric Bouts	1460	32.100.41	Met
	Virgin and Child	Workshop of Peter Paul Rubens		32.100.42	Met
	Portrait of Francesco d'Este	Rogier van der Weyden	1460	32.100.43	Met
	The Holy Family with Saint Paul and a Donor	Style of Rogier van der Weyden	1500s	32.100.44	Met
	Portrait of a Young Man of the Van Steynoert Family	Netherlandish Painter		32.100.45	Met
	Charles V (1500–1558), Holy Roman Emperor	an anonymous Netherlandish painter	1520	32.100.46	Met
	Portrait of a Woman	Quentin Matsys		32.100.47	Met
	Portrait of a Man	Quentin Matsys	1520	32.100.49	Met
	Portrait of a Woman of the Slosgin Family of Cologne	Barthel Bruyn the Younger	1557	32.100.50	Met
	The Rest on the Flight into Egypt	Follower of Quentin Metsys	1540	32.100.52	Met
	Virgin and Child	Attributed to Simon Bening	1520	32.100.53	Met
	Salvator Mundi	Workshop of Hans Memling	1475	32.100.54	Met
	The Man of Sorrows	Aelbrecht Bouts		32.100.55	Met
	Abner's Messenger before David (?); The Queen of Sheba Bringing Gifts to Solomon; The Annunciation	Master of the legend of St. Barbara	1480	32.100.56a–d	Met
	The Holy Family	Joos van Cleve		32.100.57	Met
	Virgin and Child	Style of Hans Memling	1490s	32.100.58	Met
	Virgin and Child	Hans Memling	1470s	32.100.59	Met
	The Annunciation	Joos van Cleve	1525	32.100.60	Met
	Portrait of a Man	Circle of Lucas Cranach the Elder	1537	32.100.61	Met
	Portrait of a Man	Jan Gossaert		32.100.62	Met
	Saint Paul with Paolo Pagagnotti; Christ Appearing to His Mother	Master of the legend of St. Ursula		32.100.63ab	Met
	Salvator Mundi	Albrecht Dürer the Elder		32.100.64	Met
	Portrait of a Woman	Italian (Florentine) Painter	1600s	32.100.66	Met
	Portrait of a Man	Domenico Ghirlandaio	c. 1478	32.100.67	Met
	Portrait of a Young Man	Biagio d'Antonio		32.100.68	Met
	The Story of Joseph	Biagio d'Antonio		32.100.69	Met
	Madonna and Child Enthroned with Saints	Workshop of Bernardo Daddi	1400s	32.100.70	Met
	Selvaggia Sassetti (born 1470)	Davide Ghirlandaio	c. 1487 – c. 1488	32.100.71	Met
	Madonna and Child with Saints Jerome and Francis	Italian (Umbrian) Painter	1600s	32.100.74	Met
	Madonna and Child with Saints	Giovanni di Paolo	1454	32.100.76	Met
	The Legend of the Infant Servius Tullius	Bonifazio Veronese		32.100.78	Met
	Madonna and Child with the Infant Saint John the Baptist and Angels	Pseudo-Pier Francesco Fiorentino	1500s	32.100.79	Met
	The Nativity with Saints	Ridolfo Ghirlandaio		32.100.80	Met
	Salome with the Head of Saint John the Baptist	Andrea Solari		32.100.81	Met
	Christ Crowned with Thorns	Antonello da Messina		32.100.82	Met
	Saints Catherine of Alexandria, Barbara, Agatha, and Margaret	Giovanni di Paolo		32.100.83a–d	Met
	Madonna and Child with Angels	Cosimo Rosselli		32.100.84	Met
	Doge Andrea Gritti (1455–1538)	Workshop of Titian	1600s	32.100.85	Met
	Madonna and Child Enthroned with Saints James Minor and Lucy	Paolo Veneziano		32.100.87	Met
	Portrait of a Man	North Italian Painter	1597	32.100.88	Met
	Head of the Madonna	Franciabigio		32.100.89	Met
	Madonna and Child	Italian (Venetian) Painter	1500s	32.100.93	Met
	Madonna and Child	Ercole Banci	1600s	32.100.94	Met
	The Miraculous Communion of Saint Catherine of Siena	Giovanni di Paolo		32.100.95	Met
	The Annunciation	Italian (Marchigian?) painter	1500s	32.100.96	Met
	Butler Madonna	Andrea Mantegna	1460	32.100.97	Met
	Portrait of a Woman	Attributed to Giovanni di Franco	1450s	32.100.98	Met
	Portrait of a Man in Profile	? Italian Painter	1525	32.100.99	Met
	Madonna and Child Enthroned with Saints Peter and Paul and Angels	Lippo Vanni		32.100.100	Met
	Portrait of a Man	North Italian Painter (Met, 32.100.101)		32.100.101	Met
	The Le Cellier Altarpiece	Jehan Bellegambe	1509	32.100.102	Met
	Jean d'Albon de Saint-André (1472–1549)	Attributed to Corneille de Lyon	1600s	32.100.103	Met
	Portrait of a Man with a High Hat	an anonymous French painter	1570	32.100.104	Met
	Virgin and Child Enthroned with Saints Catherine and Jerome	Spanish Painter	1500s	32.100.105	Met
	The Crucifixion, (reverse) Saint Francis of Assisi; The Resurrection, (reverse) An Abbot Saint, Possibly Saint Benedict	an anonymous northern French painter	1460	32.100.106–7	Met
	The Crucifixion of Saint Peter with a Donor; The Legend of Saint Anthony Abbot with a Donor; The Annunciation	Northern French Painter	1500s	32.100.108–11	Met
	Christ Bearing the Cross	Northern French Painter	1500s	32.100.112	Met
	Portrait of a Widow	Style of Corneille de Lyon	1600s	32.100.113	Met
	Monsieur de Bellefourière	French Painter	1521	32.100.114	Met
	Portrait of a Young Man	an anonymous French (Burgundian?) painter	1495	32.100.115	Met
	Portrait of a Man Wearing the Order of the Annunziata of Savoy	anonymous French painter	1600s	32.100.116	Met
	Jan (1438–1516), First Count of Egmond; Countess of Egmond (Magdalena van Werdenburg, 1464–1538)	North Netherlandish Painter	1600s	32.100.118, 122	Met
	Portrait of a Man in White	Monogrammist LAM	1574	32.100.119	Met
	Francis I (1494–1547), King of France	Workshop of Joos van Cleve	1600s 1500s	32.100.120	Met
	Portrait of a Man	attributed to Corneille de Lyon (Met, 32.100.121)	1600s	32.100.121	Met
	Christ among the Doctors	an anonymous Catalan Painter	1500s	32.100.123	Met
	Charles IX (1550–1574), King of France	Style of François Clouet	1561	32.100.124	Met
	Charles Coguin, Abbot of Anchin	Jehan Bellegambe		32.100.125	Met
	Salome Dancing before Herod	Spanish (Catalan) Painter	1500s	32.100.126	Met
	The Beheading of Saint John the Baptist	Spanish (Catalan) Painter	1500s	32.100.127	Met
	Salome with the Head of Saint John the Baptist	Spanish (Catalan) Painter	1500s	32.100.128	Met
	Portrait of a Man with a Gold Chain	Corneille de Lyon	1600s	32.100.129	Met
	Portrait of a Man of the Moncheaux Family	an anonymous northern French painter	1605	32.100.130	Met
	Portrait of a Man with a Pointed Collar	Attributed to Corneille de Lyon	1600s	32.100.131	Met
	Benjamin Franklin (1706–1790)	Joseph Duplessis	1778	32.100.132	Met
	A Village in a Valley	Théodore Rousseau		32.100.133	Met
	Boatman among the Reeds	Jean-Baptiste Camille Corot		32.100.136	Met
	Head of a Young Boy	Jean-Baptiste Greuze	1763	32.100.137	Met
	A Hare, Partridges, and Fruit	Jan Fyt		32.100.141	Met
	Portrait of a Woman	Nicholas Hilliard		32.100.311	Met
