= Friedsam =

Friedsam is a surname. Notable people with the surname include:

- Anna-Lena Friedsam (born 1994), German tennis player
- Michael Friedsam (1860–1931), American philanthropist
