= Madonna and Child (Mantegna, Bergamo) =

Painting by Andrea Mantegna

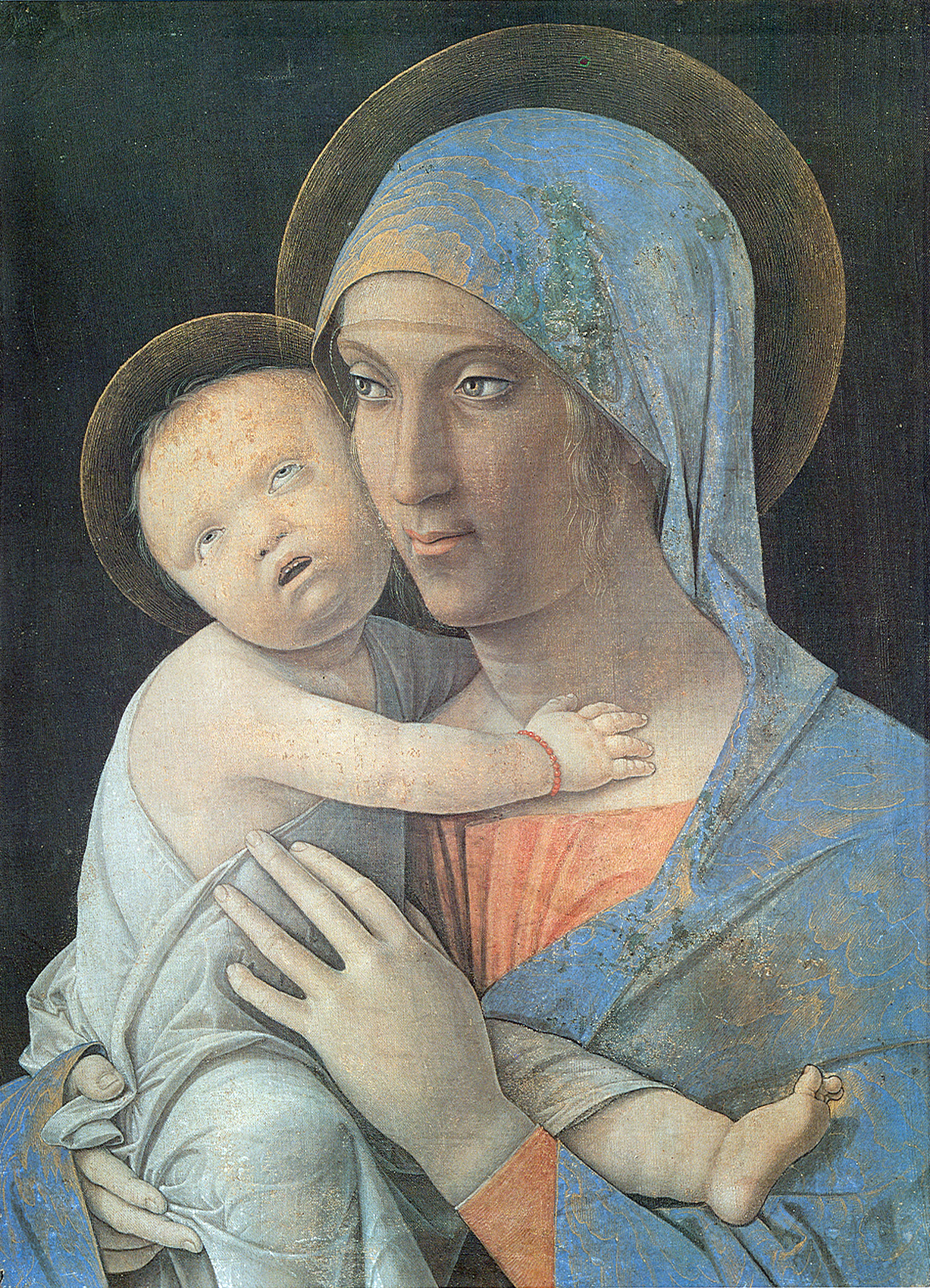
- Artist: Andrea Mantegna
- Completion date: 1490-1500
- Medium: tempera on flax canvas
- Dimensions: 43 cm × 31 cm (17 in × 12 in)
- Location: Accademia Carrara, Bergamo

Madonna and Child is a magra-tempera on flax canvas painting by Andrea Mantegna, dating to 1490-1500 or (according to Mauro Lucco) 1463-1465 . It is now in the Accademia Carrara in Bergamo. It dates to after the painter's trip to Rome and belongs to a group of small-format Madonnas for private devotion - others include Madonna with Sleeping Child (Berlin), the Poldi Pezzoli Madonna and the Butler Madonna (New York). The Bergamo work is unique among them in that it has a happy rather than melancholic atmosphere. The Christ Child wears a coral bracelet, formerly an apotropaic symbol and also a foreshadowing of his Passion.
