= Madonna with the Green Cushion =

Painting by Andrea Solari

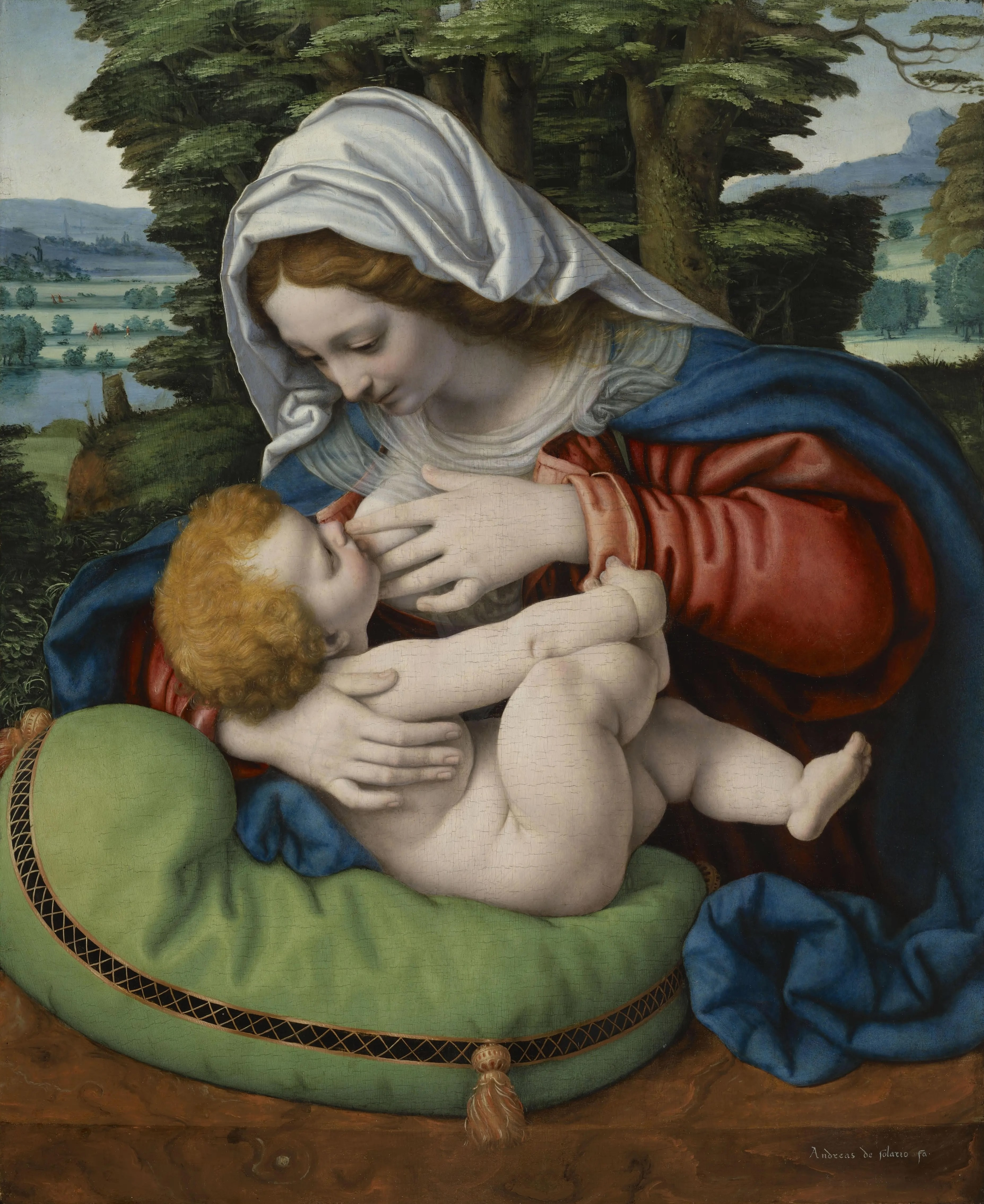
- Artist: Andrea Solari
- Year: c. 1507–1510
- Medium: Oil on wood
- Dimensions: 59.5 cm × 47.5 cm (23.4 in × 18.7 in)
- Location: Louvre, Paris, France

Madonna with the Green Cushion (French: La Vierge au coussin vert) is an oil painting by the Italian artist Andrea Solari, painted in c. 1507–1510, and it is now owned by the Louvre Museum in Paris. Its dimensions are 59.5 by 47.5 cm (23.4 by 18.7 in).

The Leonardesque type of the Madonna proves that Solari after his return from Venice, became strongly influenced by Leonardo da Vinci. The colouring and lush effects of this painting also shows Leonardo's influence, but his own artistic temperament is also present. It is considered to be one of his best known works.

== See also ==
- Breastfeeding in art

== Sources ==
- "The Louvre: Madonna with the Green Cushion". Louvre. Archived from the original on 15 June 2011. (in English)
