= Annunciation (Christus) =

Painting by Petrus Christus

The Annunciation
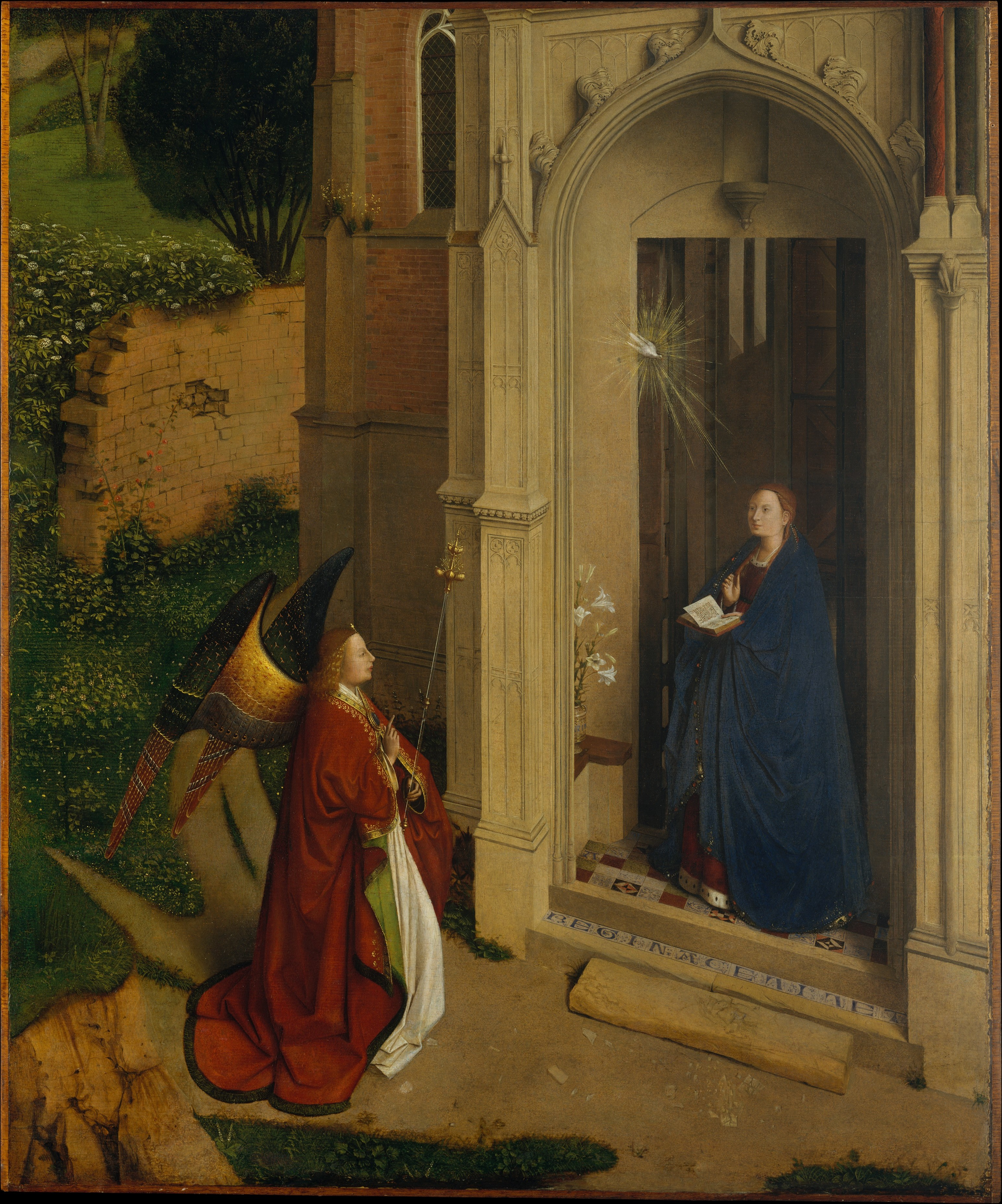
- Artist: Petrus Christus
- Year: c. 1445
- Type: Oil-on-oak panel painting
- Dimensions: 78.7 cm × 65.7 cm (31.0 in × 25.9 in)
- Location: Metropolitan Museum of Art, New York

The Annunciation (commonly the Friedsam Annunciation) is a c. 1445 oil-on-oak panel painting usually attributed to the Early Netherlandish artist Petrus Christus (d. 1476). It shows the biblical annunciation, marking the announcement by the archangel Gabriel to Mary that she will conceive and bear a son through a virgin birth and become the mother of Jesus Christ.

The panel contains a number of perspective and spatial anomalies that make it especially complex. The viewer has a bird's eye view, the framing is slightly left-of-centre, while the lack of a view of a horizon indicates that it was somewhat unskilfully cut down on three sides from a larger painting: art historians generally assume that it is a remnant of the left-hand wing of a triptych altarpiece.

The painting's attribution has been widely disputed since the early 20th century, with some art historians disputing Christus' authorship and, mainly on stylistic grounds, arguing for either Hubert van Eyck or his brother Jan van Eyck, with some giving a date as early as 1420. The panel was bequeathed to the Metropolitan Museum of Art, New York, in 1931 by the businessman and art collector Michael Friedsam.

== Description ==
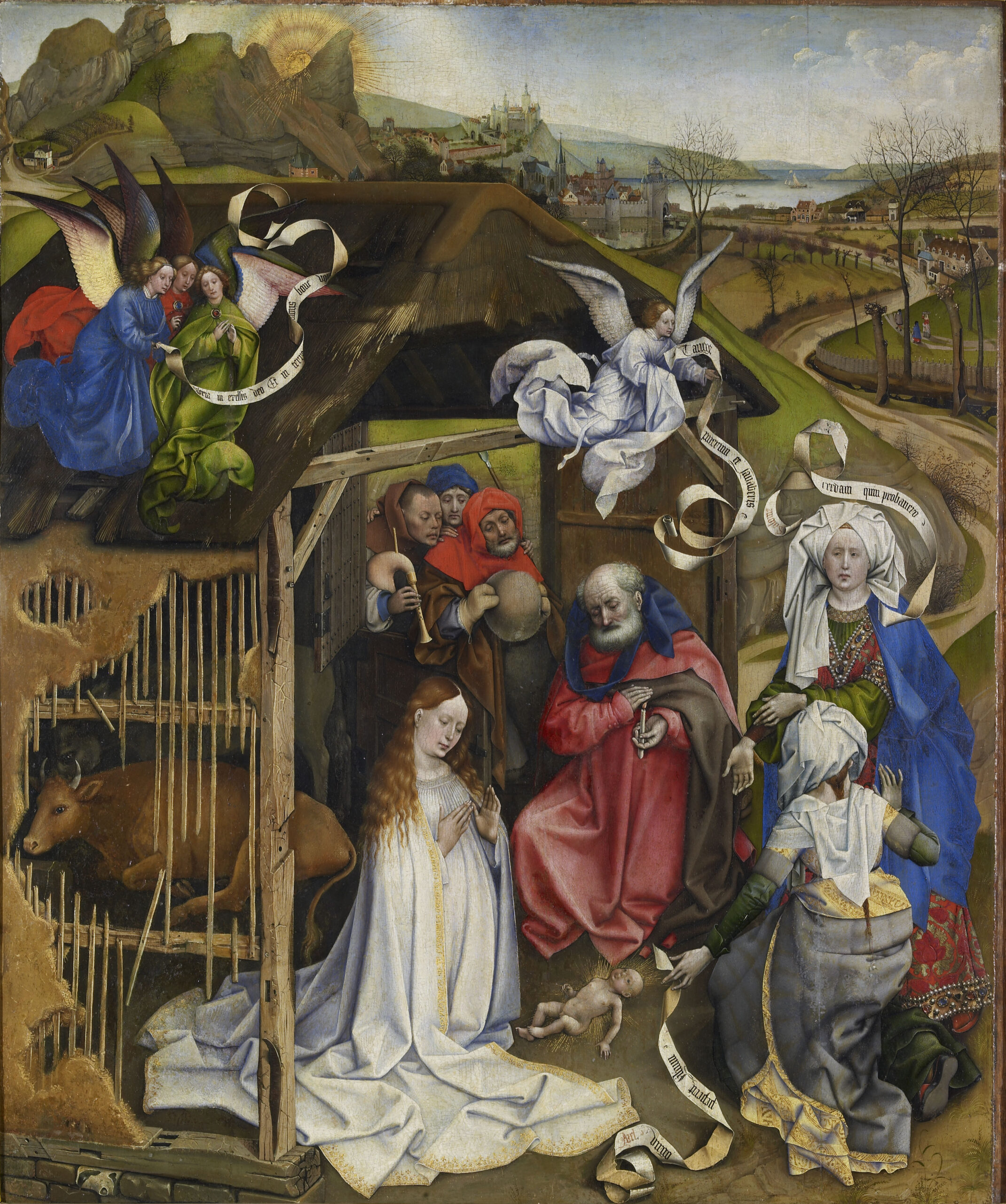
Nativity, Robert Campin, c. 1420. Musée des Beaux-Arts, Dijon

The scene depicts the biblical annunciation according to the Gospel of Luke, marking the announcement by the archangel Gabriel to Mary that she will conceive and bear a son through a virgin birth and become the mother of Jesus Christ. The church is situated within a semi-enclosed and somewhat neglected garden containing mostly wild flowers.

The painting gives the viewer a bird's-eye view of the scene. Given that the framing is slightly left-of-centre and there is no view of the horizon, art historians assume that it once contained a view of the horizon, but was cut down on three sides from a larger painting: most likely the panel is a remnant of a horizontal left-hand wing of a triptych altarpiece. The point of view is similar to that in Robert Campin's c. 1420 Nativity. However, in that work the horizon line is visible, which is lacking in the Annunciation due to the cropping.

=== Figures ===
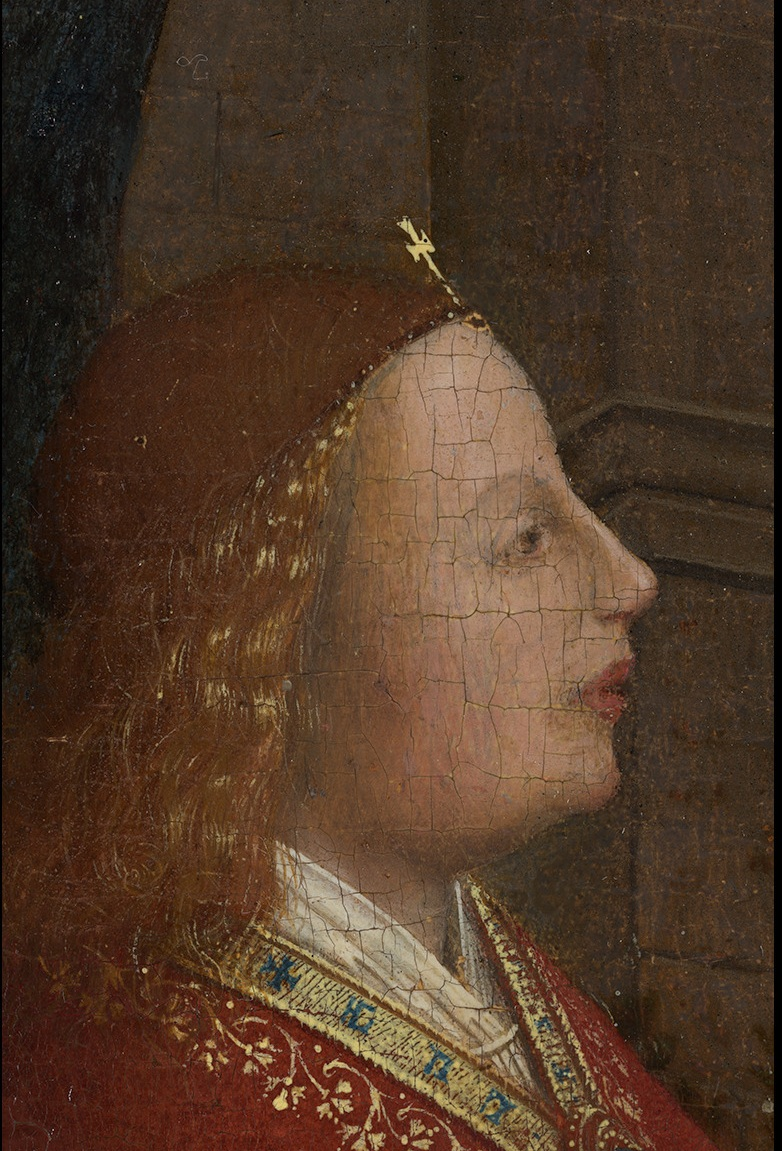
Detail of the head of the Virgin

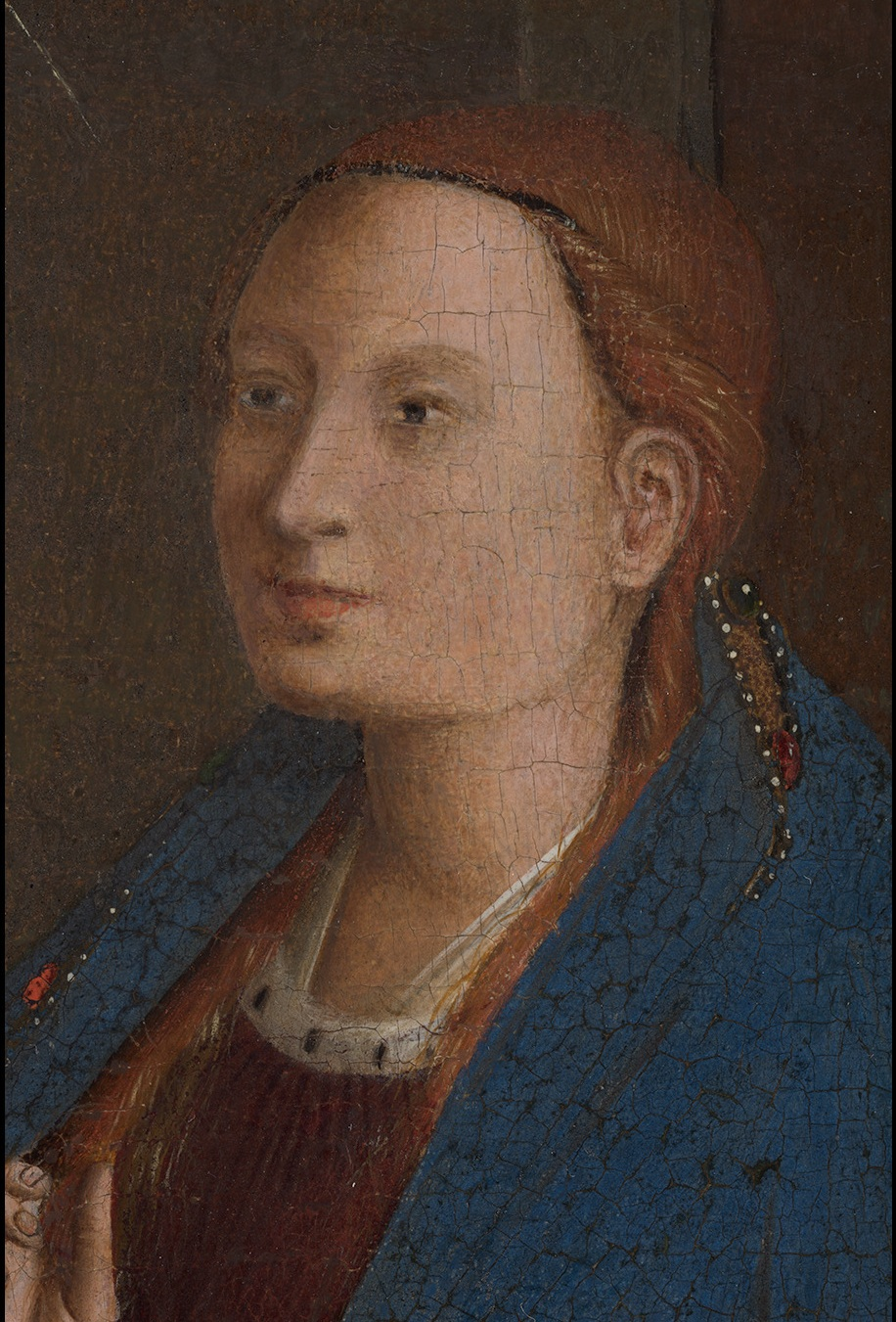
Detail of the Archangel Gabriel

Mary stands in a slightly elevated niche outside a church door. This exterior setting is unusual, given that the majority of contemporary depictions of the annunciation are set in either domestic settings or church interiors. She is dressed in blue and holding a small prayerbook, most likely an illuminated book of hours. The vase of white lilies on the bench to her right symbolise her purity.

According to the art historian Maryan Ainsworth, the doorway represents a "porta coeli, or spiritual gateway to heaven". The second door step, on which Mary stands, contains multicoloured tiles decorated with geometric and floral patterns. The first step is lined by the words "REGINA CELI LET[ARE]" ("Queen of Heaven, Rejoice", the opening line of the Eastertide antiphon to the Blessed Virgin), which are painted but presented as if inscriptions. On either side of this phrase are the letters "A" and "M", representing the words Ave Maria, the traditional greeting to Mary from Gabriel.

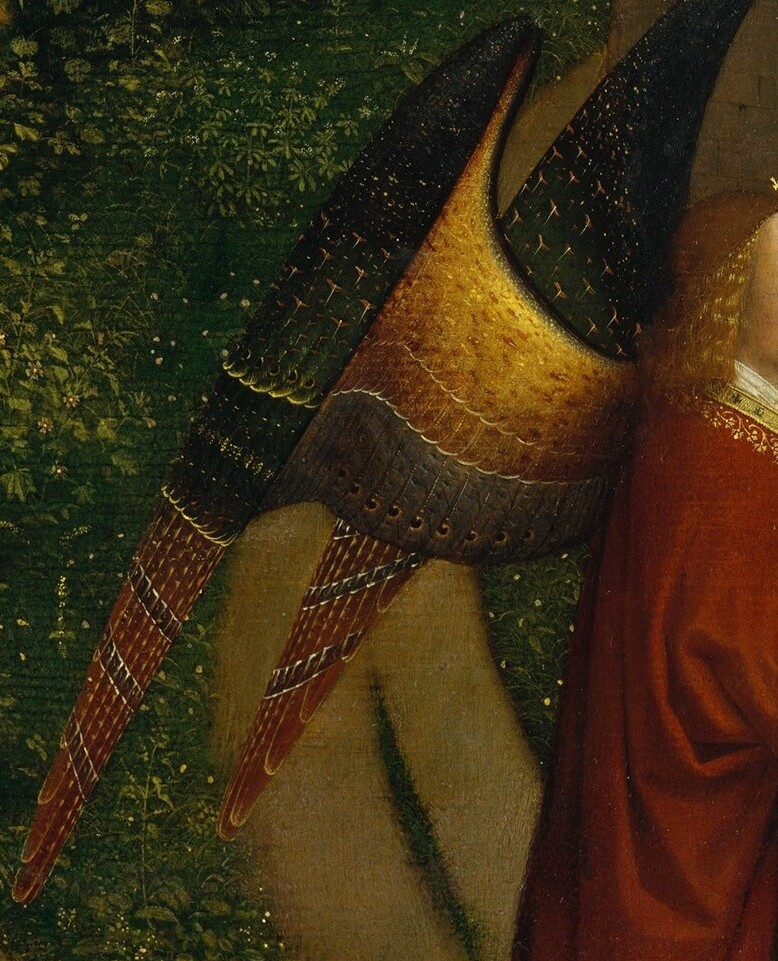
Detail of Gabriel's wings

The lower step is chipped and contains a number of cracks which Ainsworth suggests are intended to represent how the "unfaithful will stumble and fall...unable to attain entrance to the house of God [and] thus represents a stumbling block [for] those who have literally fallen from grace...The Virgin may thus be understood as the intercessor through whom one gains entrance to the holy realm."

To her left and before her, Gabriel kneels in what appears to be an enclosed garden, a common motif to symbolise chastity. Gabriel holds a scepter and has brightly coloured wings. He wears red and white liturgical vestments embroidered with gold and fastened by a brooch.

=== Architecture and garden ===
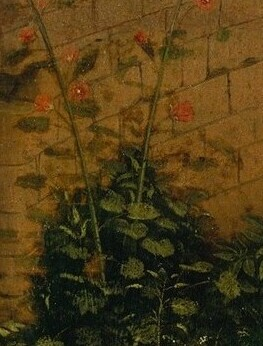
Detail of hollyhock (symbolising salvation) in bloom and growing alongside the garden wall

The architecture of the church is complex and contains features of the Romanesque on the right and Gothic on the left. Art historians interpret the building as marking the changes brought by the transition from the Old to the New Testaments, and from Judaism to Christianity. The Gothic half is more visible and has windows, a symbol of divine light. The two Gothic buttress are wider and more elaborate and capped by decorative figures described in Flemish as "Kruisbloeme" (flower of the cross).

The niche above Mary, which would normally contain carved figures, is empty, presumably representing the anticipation of the birth of Jesus.

The garden features numerous and exact depictions of wildflowers, many of which have symbolic meaning. They include common daisies (representing innocence) to the immediate left of Gabrielle and just above the end of his robe, wild strawberries (symbolising righteousness and virtue), early-purple orchid (representing fertility) in the lower right-hand corner. The most prominent of these is the lily in a thin glass vase in the alcove beside Mary, and a type of climbing vine just above the wall. According to Ainsworth, the fact that the garden is unmanicured and contains wild rather than domestic flowers, and that the wall is crumbling, likely attests to the scene is set "before the Advent of Christ, its Restorer."

== Influences ==
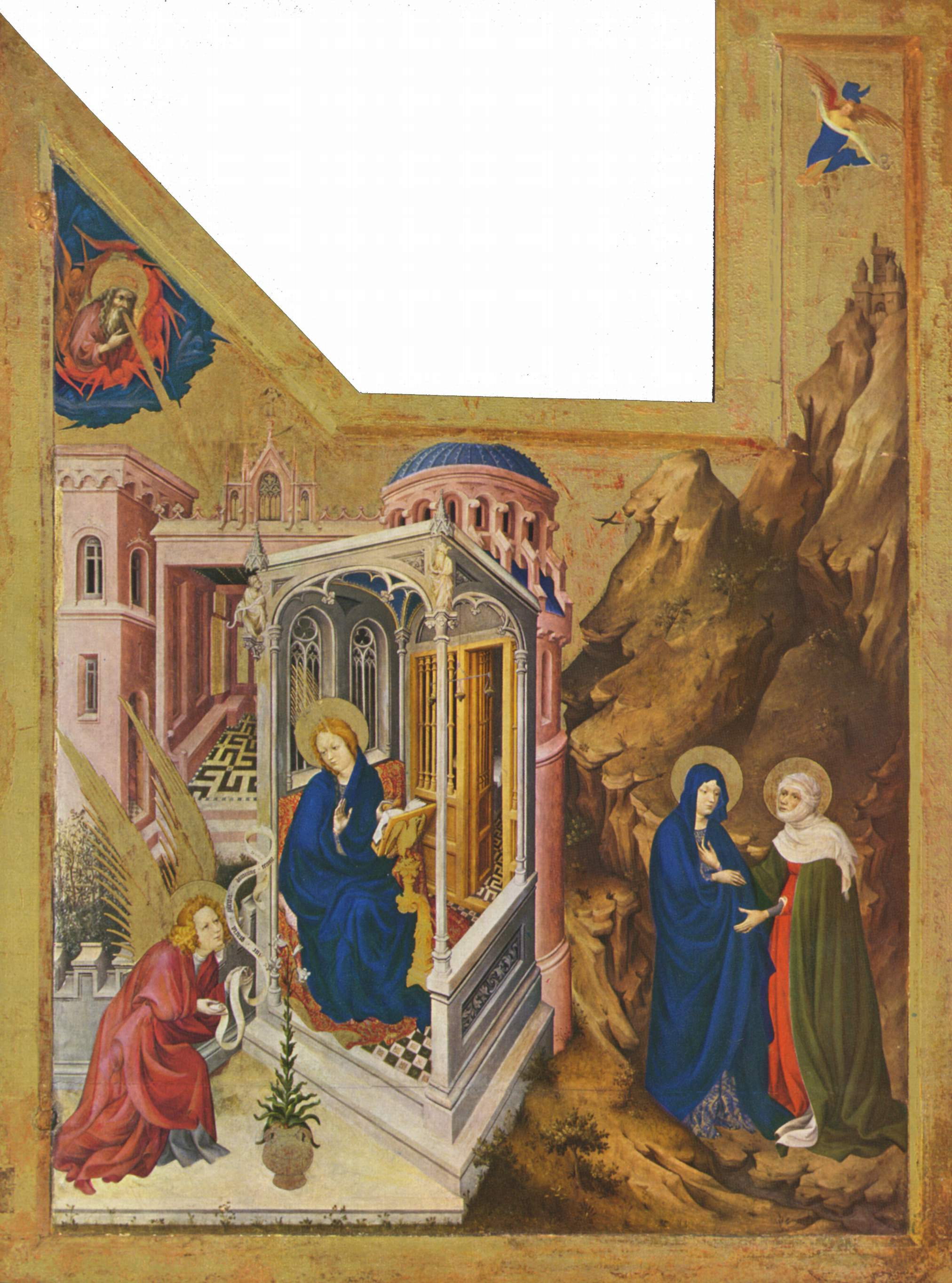
Annunciation, Melchior Broederlam, c. 1398. Musée des Beaux-Arts, Dijon

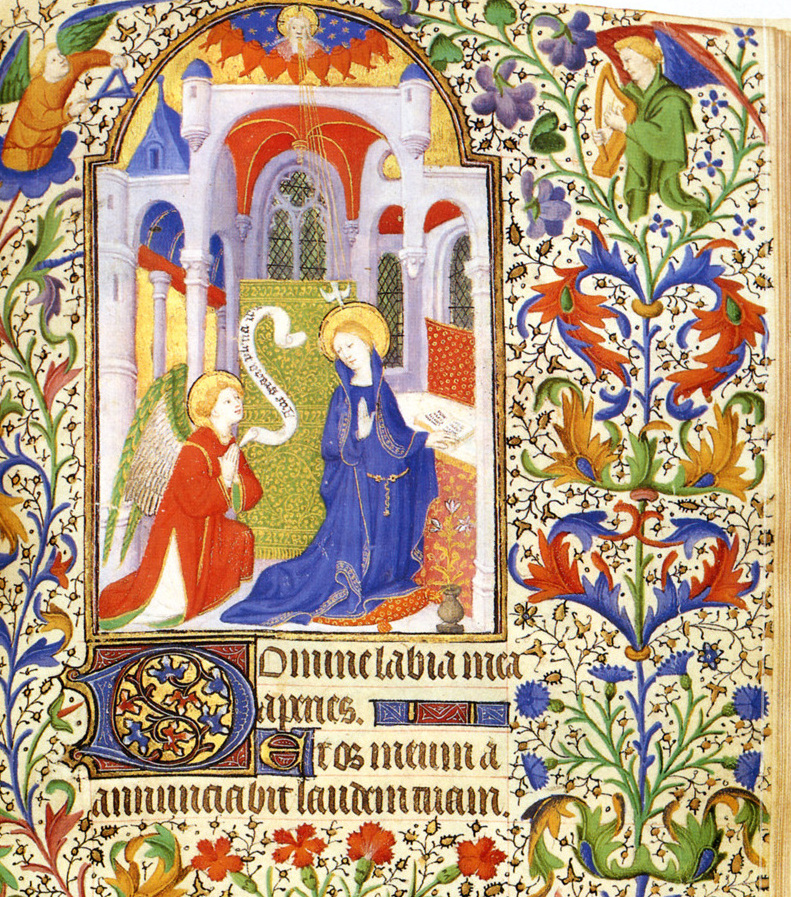
Detail from a folio from the Hours of Jean de Boucicaut, c. 1405–1408. Musée Jacquemart-André, Paris

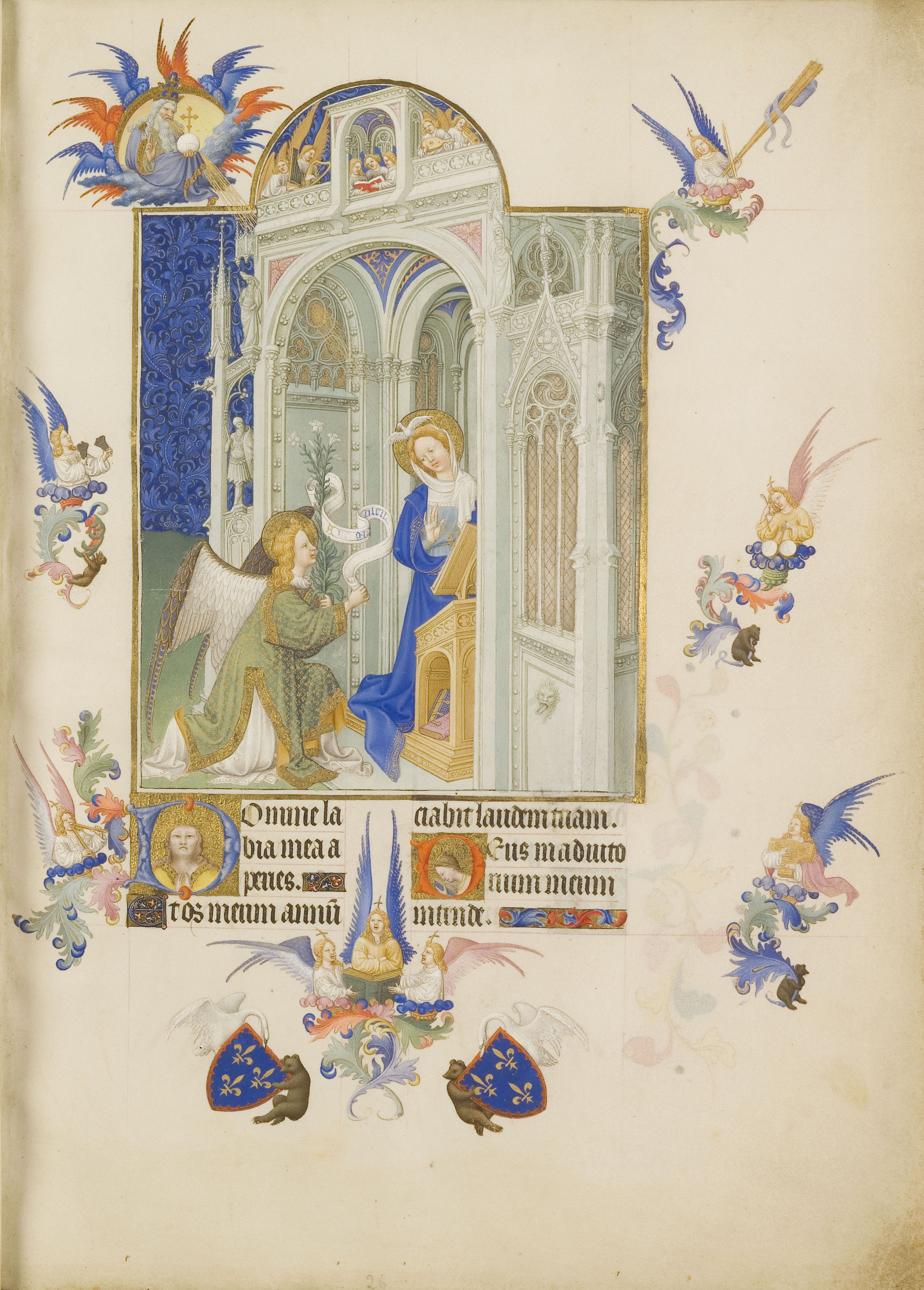
Folio 26r, Annunciation, "Très Riches Heures du Duc de Berry. Limbourg brothers, c. 1411–1416

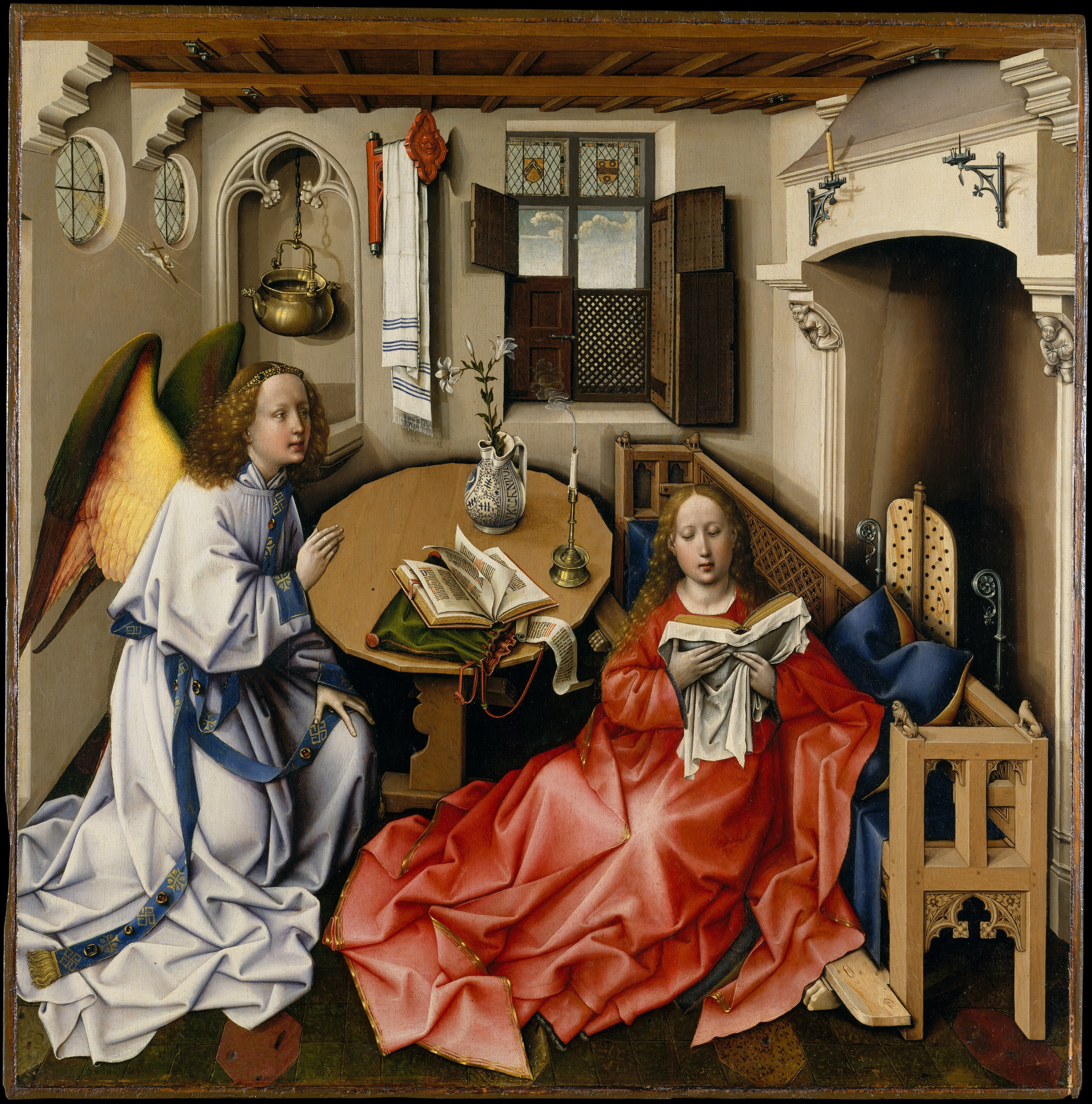
Center panel of the Mérode Altarpiece, after 1422, Robert Campin

== Attribution ==
The panel was thought to be by Hubert van Eyck throughout the 19th century, until his better-known brother Jan, became more favoured from the early 20th century. This debate occurred during a period when Early Netherlandish painting (ENA) was undergoing a resurgence in interest and reappraisal, and new research was shedding light on identifying the individual artists and their artistic development.

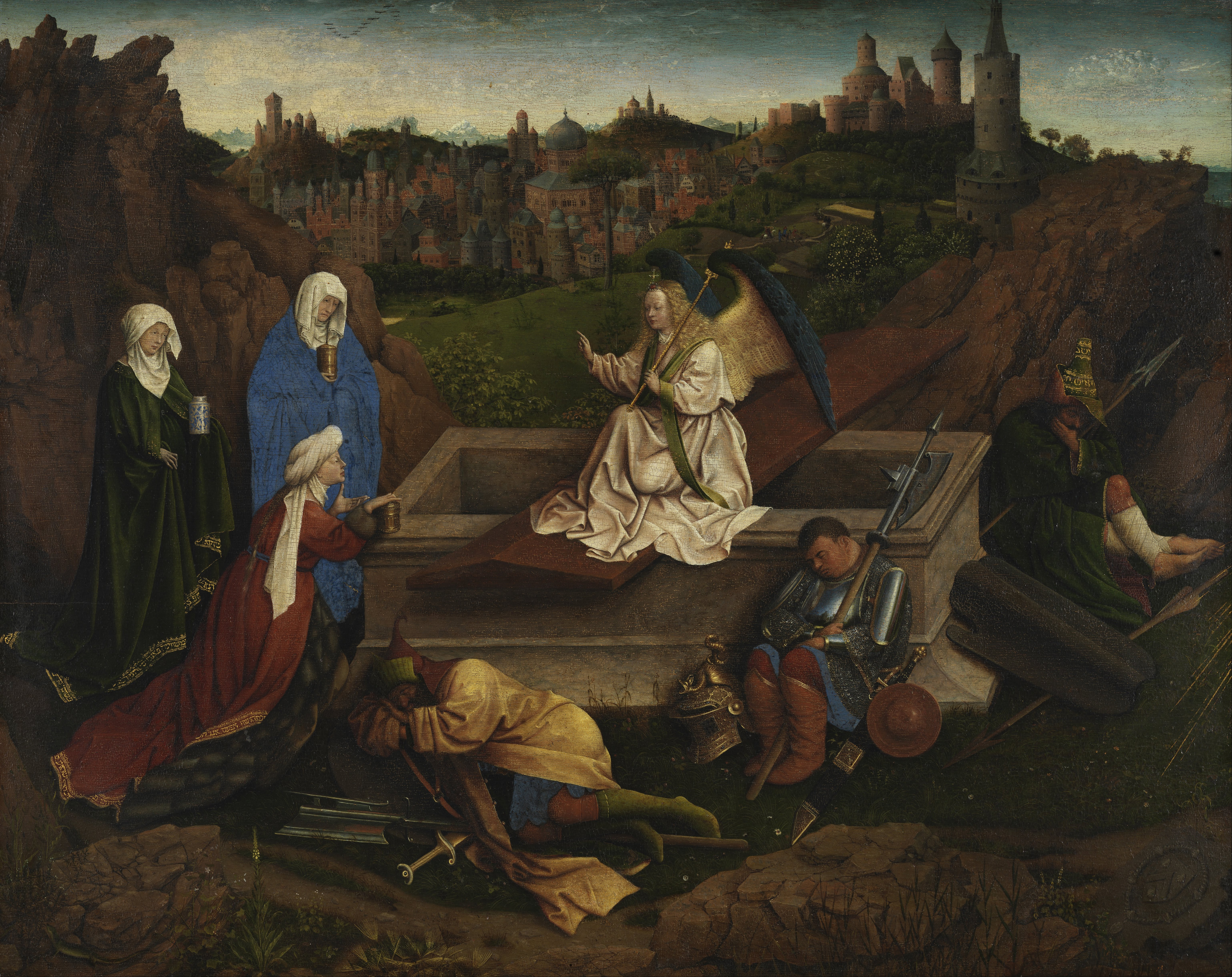
The Three Marys at the Tomb, painted or begun by Hubert van Eyck, c. 1410–1420

By the 1930s, the attribution had become a matter of contention between the leading ENA scholars Erwin Panofsky (who attributed Jan van Eyck) and Max Jakob Friedländer (who favoured Christus), with other art historians taking the "middle view" that it was a copy Christus had made of a lost Jan van Eyck painting.

Writing in 1935, Panofsky dismissed the possibility of Christus' hand on the basis that its "composition, colourisation and perspective" are too old-fashioned ("archaic") to have been completed during Christus' mature period. He concluded that the Friedsam Annunciation was "beyond the capabilities of Petrus Christus, who, with all his skill and soundness, never achieved that peculiar richness and...homogeneous density which distinguishes the works of the brothers van Eyck."

== Provenance ==
The businessman and leading art collector Michael Friedsam bequeathed the panel to the Metropolitan Museum of Art, New York, on his death in 1931, as part of a much larger donation that included important Northern Renaissance works by Gerard David, Vermeer, Rembrandt and Pieter de Hooch.

== Sources ==
- Ainsworth, Maryan. Petrus Christus: Renaissance Master of Bruges. New York: Metropolitan Museum of Art, 1994. ISBN 0-8109-6482-1
- Panofsky, Erwin. Early Netherlandish Painting. Cambridge (MA): Harvard University Press, 1953
- Panofsky, Erwin. "The Friedsam Annunciation and the Problem of the Ghent Altarpiece". The Art Bulletin, volume 17, number 4, December 1935. JSTOR 3045596
- Sperling, Della Clason. In: "From Van Eyck to Bruegel: Early Netherlandish Painting in The Metropolitan Museum of Art". New York: Metropolitan Museum of Art, 1999. ISBN 0-8709-9870-6
- Robb, David. "The Iconography of the Annunciation in the Fourteenth and Fifteenth Centuries". The Art Bulletin, volume 18, number 4, December 1936. JSTOR 3045651
- Russell, John. "The Iconography of the Friedsam Annunciation". The Art Bulletin, volume 60, number 1, March 1978, pp. 24–27. JSTOR 3049740
- Upton, Joel Morgan. Petrus Christus: His Place in Fifteenth-Century Flemish Painting. University Park, PA: Pennsylvania State University Press, 1989. ISBN 0-2710-0672-2
- Ward, John. "A New Look at the Friedsam Annunciation". The Art Bulletin, volume 50, number 2, June 1968, pp. 184–187. JSTOR 3048532
