= The Head of John the Baptist (Solari) =

1507 painting by Andrea Solari

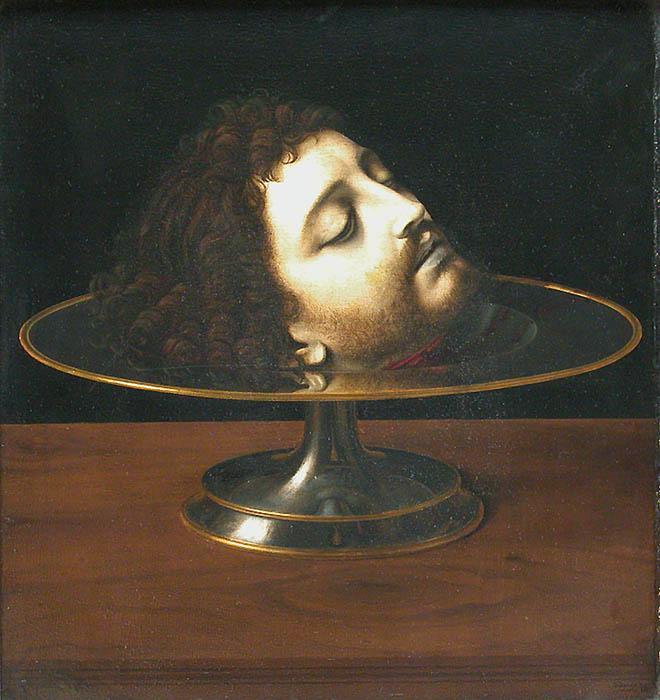

The Head of John the Baptist is a 1507 oil on poplar board painting by Andrea Solari, probably commissioned by Cardinal Georges d'Amboise.

== Details ==
Signed and dated at bottom right, the image depicts the severed head of John the Baptist on a charger plate in which is a reflection, probably of Solari himself.

The frame bears a seemingly original Latin inscription evoking John the Baptist. It is now in the Louvre in Paris, to which it was given by Eugène Lecomte in 1868. From 4 December 2012 to 11 March 2013 it was part of the temporary exhibition "Renaissance" at Louvre-Lens under catalogue number 25.
