= Ecce Homo (Andrea Solari) =

16th c. paintings by Andrea Solari

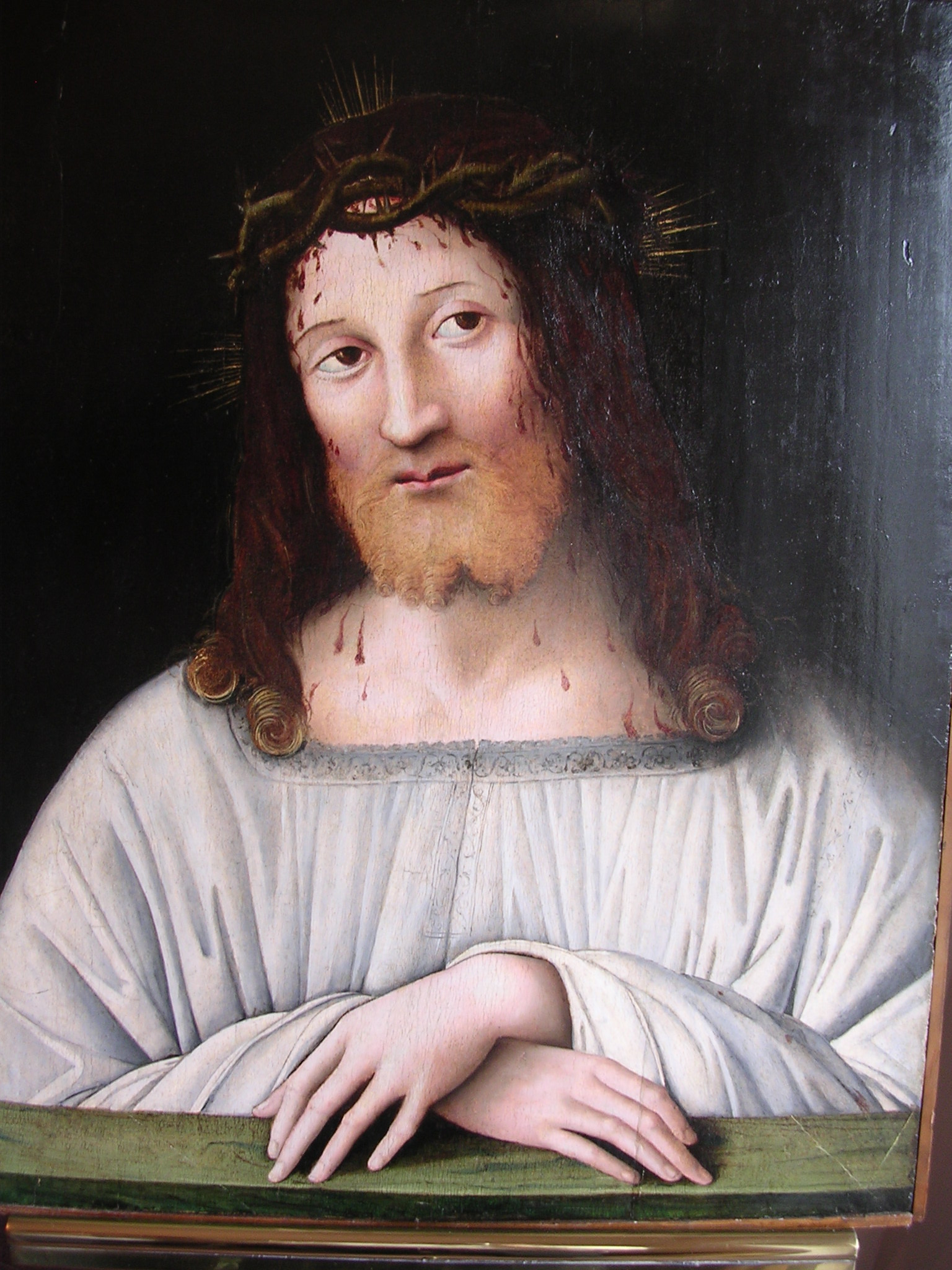
Brescia version

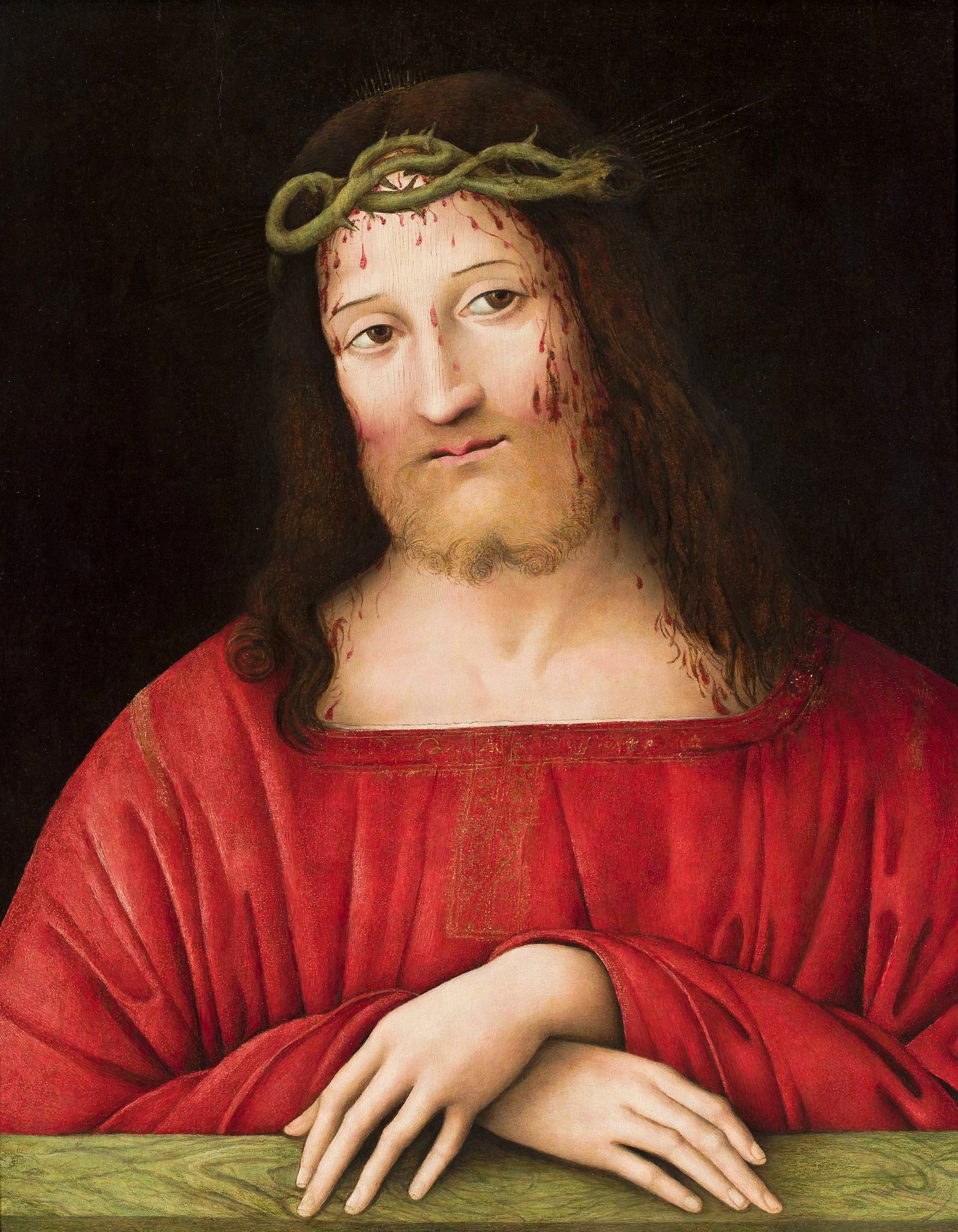
Warsaw version

Ecce Homo is a subject of a series of oil on panel paintings by Andrea Solari, dating to between 1505 and 1510. Its hands show the influence of Solari's master Leonardo da Vinci and particularly his Lady with an Ermine.

== List of versions ==
- Museo Poldi Pezzoli, Milan, oil on panel, 43x33 cm, c. 1505-1506
- Ashmolean Museum, Oxford, 57x44 cm, c.1505-1507 - shows Christ holding the rod with which he is about to be flogged
- National Museum, Warsaw, 61.8x50.2 cm, 1505-1510 - shows Christ wearing a purple cloak, unlike the red cloak of the other versions
- Private collection, Brescia, 61x50 cm, c.1505-1510
