= Poldi Pezzoli Madonna =

Painting by Andrea Mantegna from the 1490s

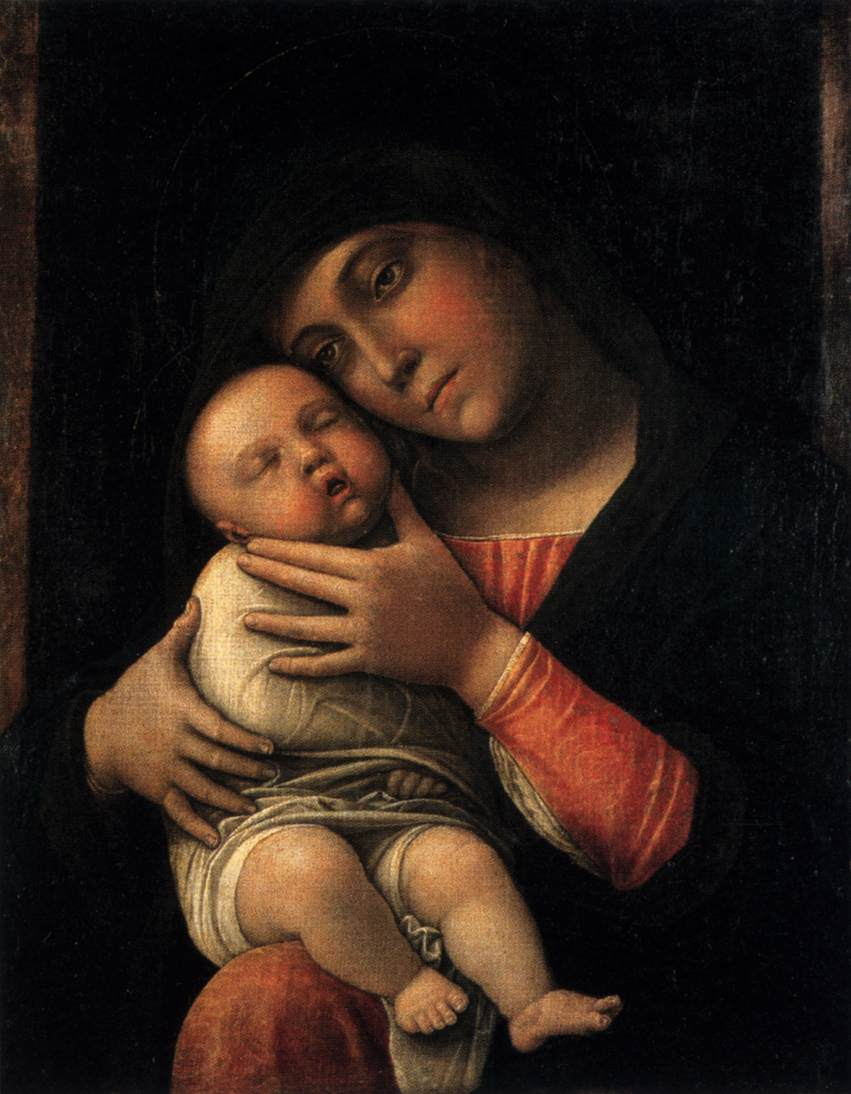
- Artist: Andrea Mantegna
- Year: 1490-1500
- Medium: tempera on canvas
- Dimensions: 43 cm × 35 cm (17 in × 14 in)
- Location: Museo Poldi Pezzoli, Milan

The Poldi Pezzoli Madonna or Madonna with the Sleeping Christ Child is a tempera on canvas painting by Andrea Mantegna, dating to around 1490-1500, after the painter's trip to Rome. It was bought from Giovanni Morelli's collection by Gian Giacomo Poldi Pezzoli shortly after the 1850s and is now in the Museo Poldi Pezzoli in Milan. It was restored in 1863 by Giuseppe Molteni, who added the varnish which has now yellowed.

It belongs to a group of small-format Madonnas by the painter, produced for private devotion. As in Madonna with Sleeping Child (Berlin) and Madonna and Child (Bergamo), the Virgin is touching her face to her son's, a pose drawn from Donatello, particularly his Pazzi Madonna. Her expression is pensive and melancholic, perhaps foreseeing her son's passion - the white cloth around him prefigures the sudarium.
