= Pezzoli (surname) =

Pezzoli is an Italian surname. Notable people with the surname include:

- Adriano Pezzoli (born 1964), Italian male long-distance runner
- Cristina Pezzoli (1963–2020), Italian theatre director
- Gian Giacomo Poldi Pezzoli (1822–1879), Italian count
