= Andrea Solari =

Italian painter (1460–1524)

Andrea Solario
- Born: Andrea Solari c. 1465; Milan, Lombardy
- Died: c. 1524 (aged 63–64); Milan, Lombardy
- Education: Antonello da Messina
- Known for: Painting
- Notable work: Charles d'Amboise, Madonna with the Green Cushion, et al.
- Movement: Renaissance
- Patrons: influenced by Leonardo

Andrea Solari (also Solario) (c. 1465–1524) was an Italian Renaissance painter of the Milanese school. He was initially named Andre del Gobbo, but more confusingly as Andrea del Bartolo a name shared with two other Italian painters, the 14th-century Siennese Andrea di Bartolo, and the 15th-century Florentine Andrea di Bartolo.

His paintings can be seen in Venice, Milan, The Louvre and the Château de Gaillon (Normandy, France). One of his better-known paintings is the Madonna with the Green Cushion (c. 1507) in the Louvre.

== History ==
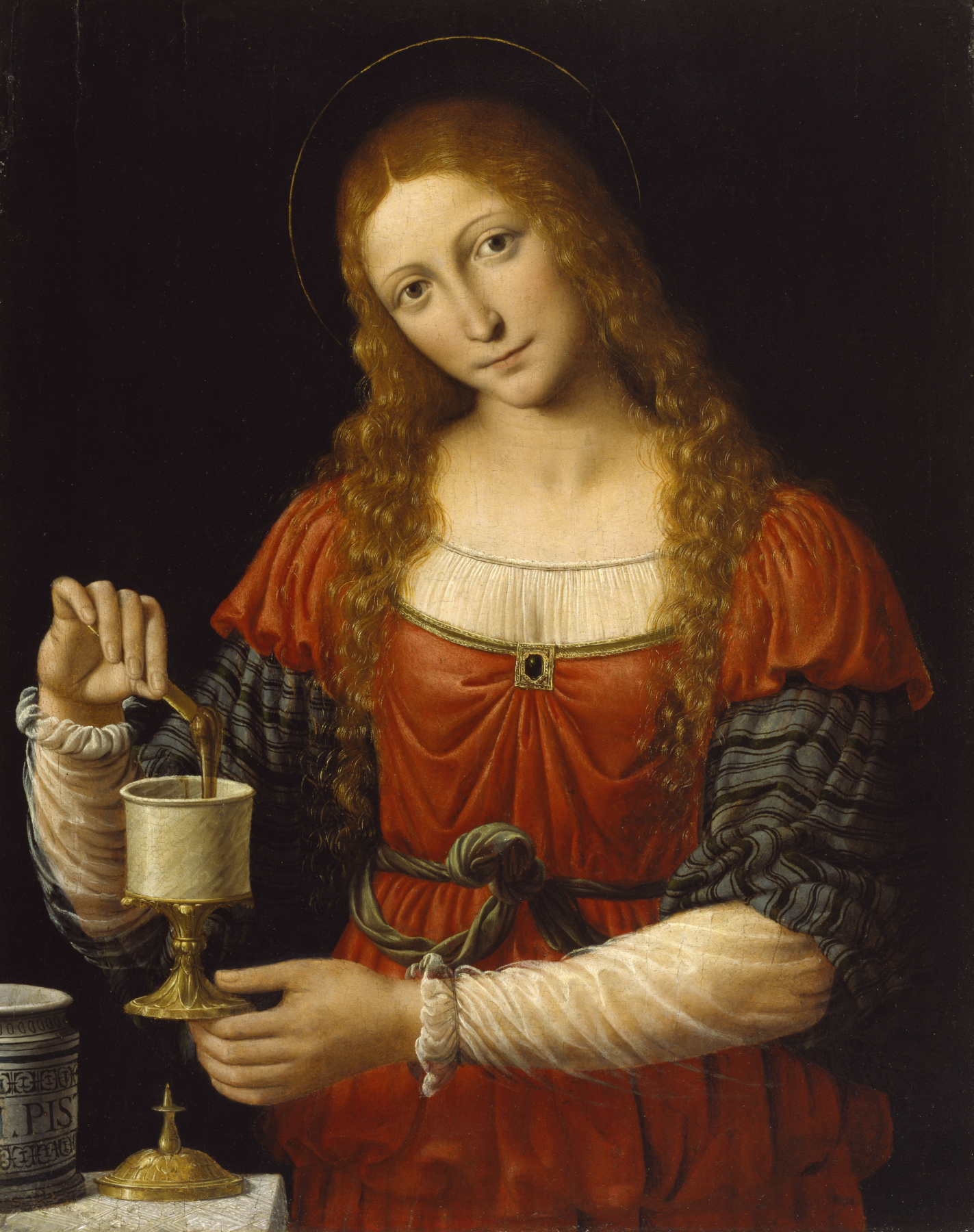
Mary Magdalene went to anoint Christ's dead body, only to discover that he was resurrected. She is shown here transferring the ointment from a maiolica pharmacy jar to a smaller vessel. c. 1524

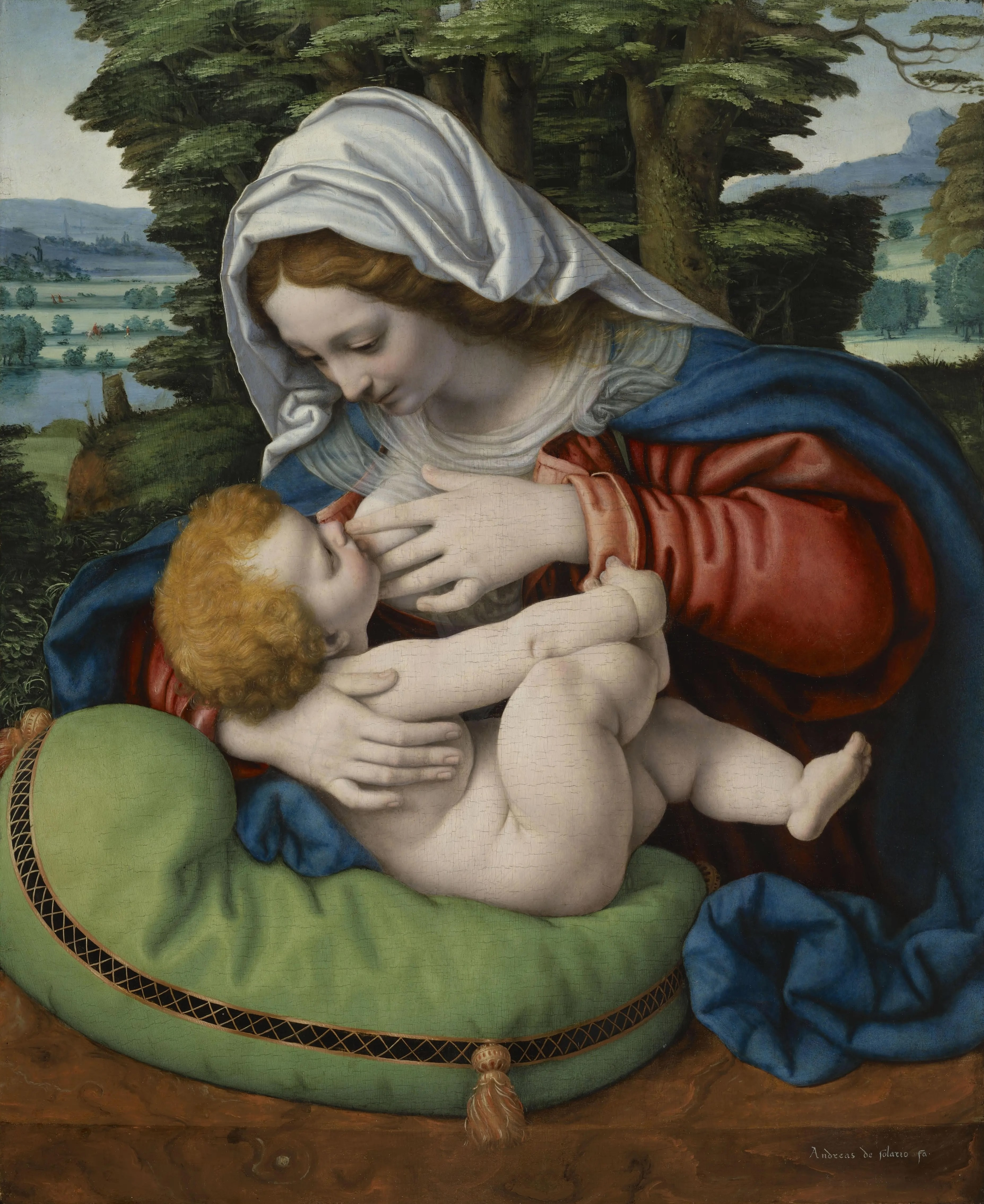
Madonna with the Green Cushion, 1507–1510, Oil on wood (poplar) H. 59.5 cm; W. 47.5 cm, Musée du Louvre.

Solario was born in Milan. He was one of the most important followers of Leonardo da Vinci, and brother of Cristoforo Solari, who gave him his first training whilst employed extensively on work at the Milan Cathedral, and at the Certosa di Pavia. In 1490 he accompanied his brother to Venice, where he seems to have been strongly influenced by Antonello da Messina, who was then active in the city. The fine portrait of a Venetian Senator (currently at the National Gallery of London) displayed Antonello's plastic conception of form and was probably painted about 1492. The two brothers returned to Milan in 1493. The Ecce Homo at the Poldi-Pezzoli Museum, notable for its strong modelling, may have been painted soon after his arrival.

Solari's earliest dated work is a Holy Family and St. Jerome with a fine landscape background, executed at Murano in 1495 and now in the Brera Gallery. The original work influenced Correggio's painting, The Holy Family with Saint Jerome in 1515. The Leonardesque type of the Madonna proves that Andrea, after his return from Venice, became strongly influenced by the great Florentine artist, who was then carrying everything before him. To this period of Andrea belong a small Crucifixion (1503, at the Louvre) and the portrait of Charles d'Amboise (Louvre); the portrait of Giovanni Longoni (1505, National Gallery of London); the Annunciation (1506, Fitzwilliam Museum, Cambridge); and the Madonna with the Green Cushion (Louvre), for which a sensitive drawing of the Virgin's head is in the Biblioteca Ambrosiana at Milan; and the Head of the Baptist in a silver charger (1507, Louvre).

In 1507 Andrea Solari went to France with letters of introduction to the Cardinal of Amboise, and was employed for two years on frescoes in the chapel of his castle of Gaillon in Normandy. According to Giovanni Morelli's suggestion, the artist may have visited Flanders before returning to his native country, and this may account for the Flemish character of his later work.

The artist was back in Italy in 1515, the date of the Flight into Egypt (Poldi-Pezzoli Collection) with its harmonious and detailed landscape background. To this period belong the Procession to Calvary (Borghese Gallery, Rome); the portrait of the Chancellor Domenico Morone (Palazzo Scotti, Milan); and the Woman playing a guitar (at the National Gallery of Ancient Art, Rome).

Andrea's last work was an altarpiece representing The Assumption of the Virgin for the Certosa di Pavia, left unfinished at his death and completed by Bernardino Campi about 1576.

== Works ==
- Portrait of a Young Man, c. 1490, oil on panel, 31x28 cm, Madrid, Thyssen-Bornemisza Museum
- Madonna with Child, c. 1495, oil on panel, 30,5x27 cm, Milan, Poldi-Pezzoli Museum
- Man with a Pink Carnation, c. 1495, oil on panel, 50x39 cm, National Gallery of London
- Christ carrying the cross, 1495–1500, oil on panel, 34x26 cm, Brescia, Pinacoteca Tosio Martinengo
- Portrait of a Man, c. 1500, oil on panel, 42x32 cm, Milan, Brera Gallery
- Christ crowned with thorns, 1500–1505, oil on panel, 39x31 cm, Bergamo, Accademia Carrara
- Head of a Bearded Man, 1500–1510, black, red, and yellow chalk on brownish paper, New York, Metropolitan Museum
- Portrait of Giovanni Cristoforo Longoni, 1505, oil on panel, 79x60,5 cm, National Gallery of London
- Ecce Homo, 1505–1506, oil on panel, 43x33 cm, Milan, Poldi-Pezzoli Museum
- Ecce Homo, 1506–1507, oil on panel, 43x34 cm, Belgrade, National Museum of Serbia
- Lamentation over the Dead Christ, c. 1505–1507, oil on panel, 168x152 cm, Washington, National Gallery of Art
- Ecce Homo, 1505–1507, oil on panel, 57x44 cm, Oxford, Ashmolean Museum
- The Head of John the Baptist, 1507, oil on poplar board
- Portrait of Charles d'Amboise, c. 1507, oil on panel, 75x52 cm, Paris, Louvre
- The Head of Saint John the Baptist on a Charger, 1507, oil on panel, 46x43 cm, Paris, Louvre
- Madonna with the Green Cushion, 1507, oil on panel, 59x47 cm, Paris, Louvre
- Christ's flagellation, c. 1509, oil on panel, 63x45 cm, Philadelphia Museum of Art
- Madonna with Child, c. 1509, oil on panel, 27,2x27,9 cm, Milan, Poldi-Pezzoli Museum
- Woman playing the lute, c. 1510, oil on panel, 65x52 cm, Rome, Palazzo Barberini, Galleria Nazionale d'Arte Antica
- St Jerome in the desert, 1510–1515, oil on panel, 69x543 cm, County Durham, Bowes Museum
- St John the Baptist; St Anthony, 1512, oil on panel, 16x13 cm each, Milan, Poldi-Pezzoli Museum
- Christ carrying the cross, 1513, oil on panel, 45.5 x 34 cm, Nantes, Musée des Beaux-Arts
- Rest on the Flight into Egypt, 1515, oil on panel, 76x55 cm, Milan, Poldi-Pezzoli Museum
- Salome with the Head of St John the Baptist, 1520–1524, oil on panel, 58,5x57,5 cm, Vienna, Kunsthistorisches Museum
- Salome with the Head of St John the Baptist, ca. 1507–1509, oil on wood, 57.2x47 cm, New York, Metropolitan Museum
- Blessing Christ, c. 1524, oil on panel, 203x130 cm, New York, Metropolitan Museum
- The Assumption of the Virgin, 1524, oil on panel, 374x217 cm, Certosa di Pavia

== Gallery ==
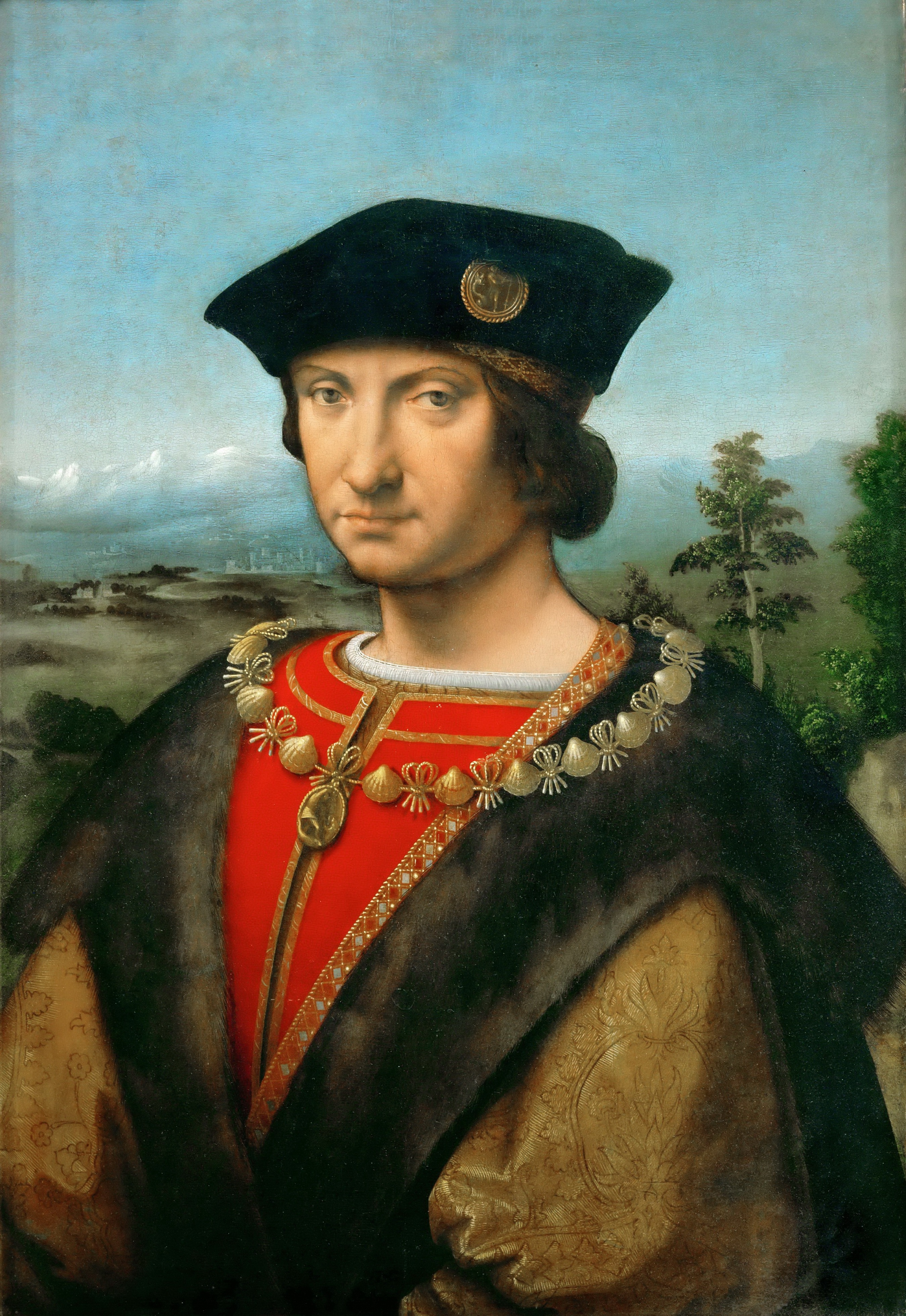
Charles d'Amboise, c. 1507 - oil on canvas; H. 75 cm, W. 52 cm, Louvre

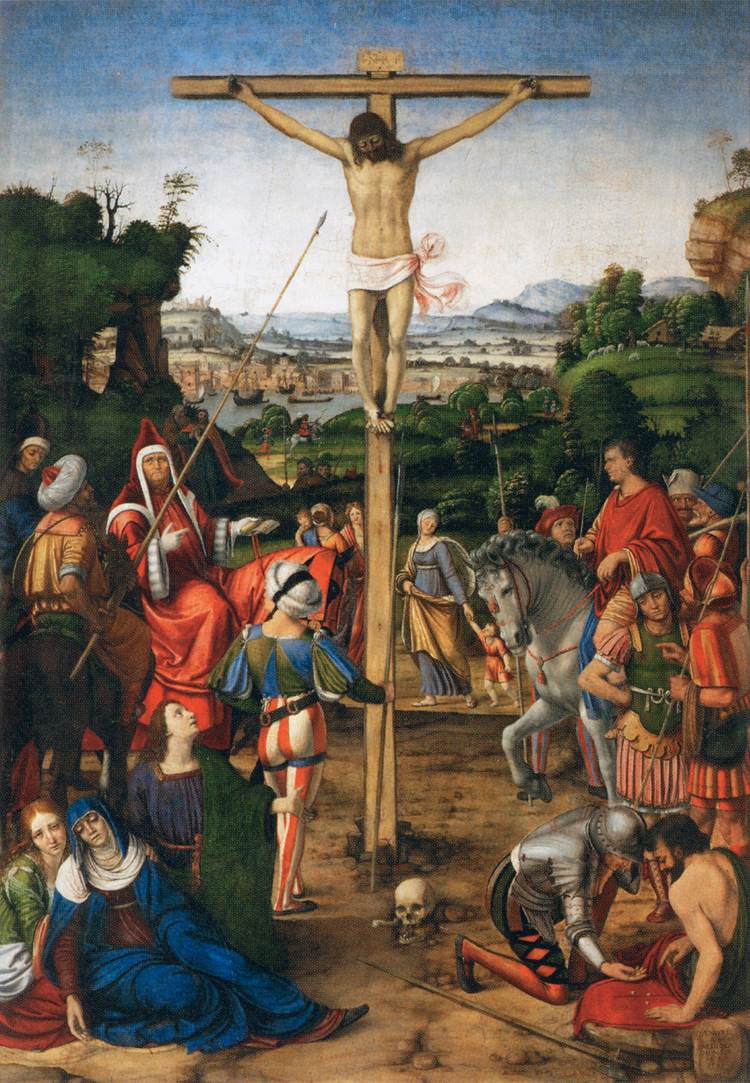
Christ on the Cross, 1503 - oil on wood; H. 111.5 cm, W. 77 cm, Louvre

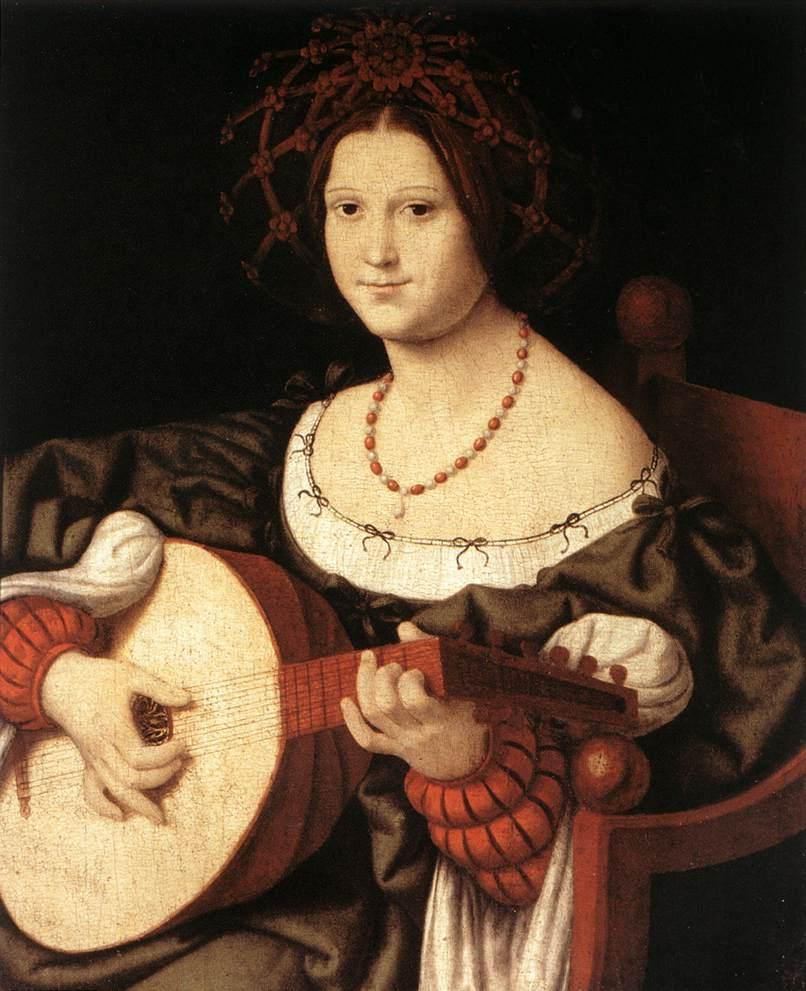
Woman playing the lute, c. 1510 - oil on canvas; H. 62,6 cm, W.49,5 cm, National Gallery of Ancient Art

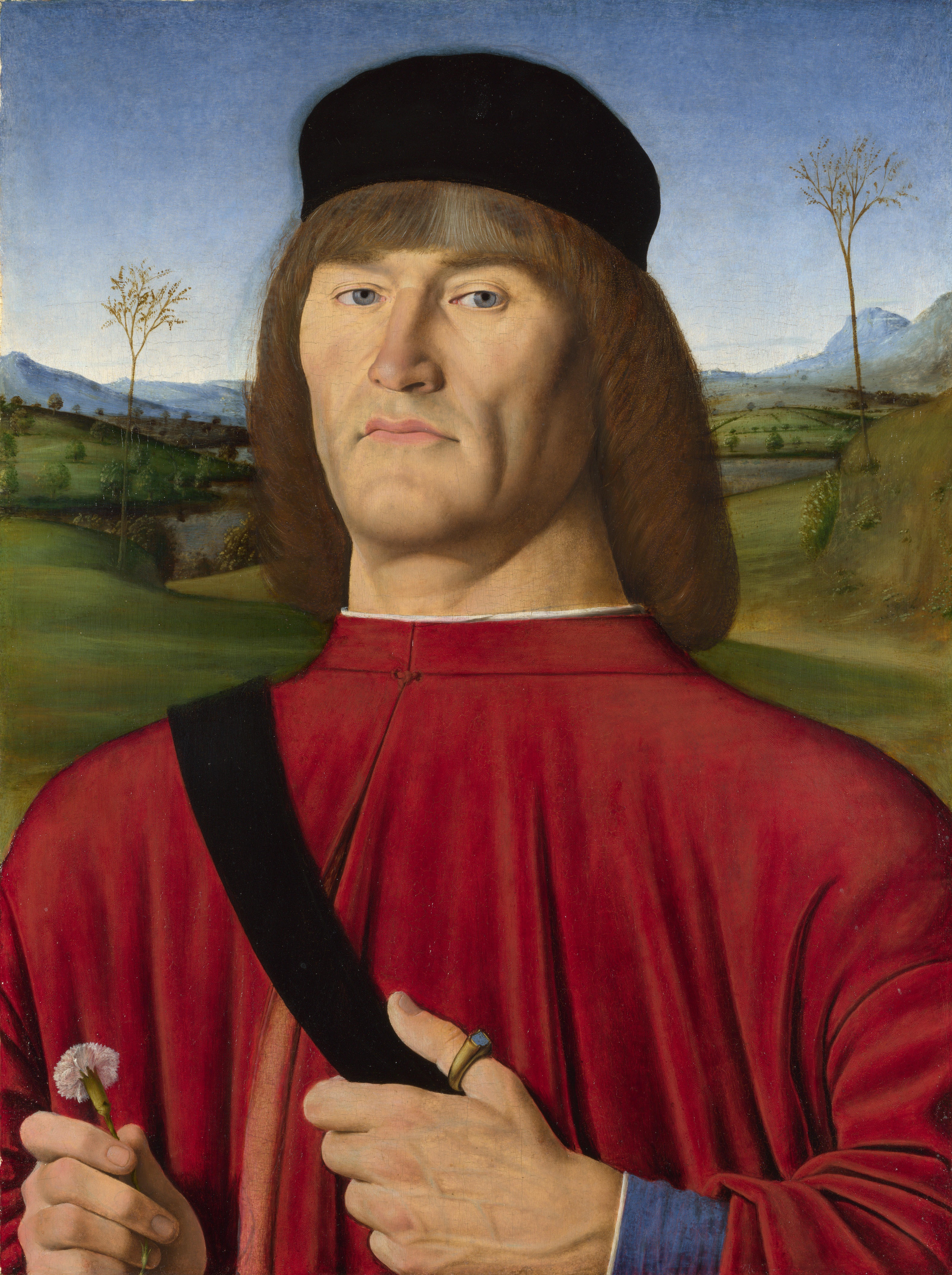
Man with a Pink Carnation, c. 1495 - Oil & egg tempera on poplar; H. 50 cm, W. 39 cm, National Gallery of London

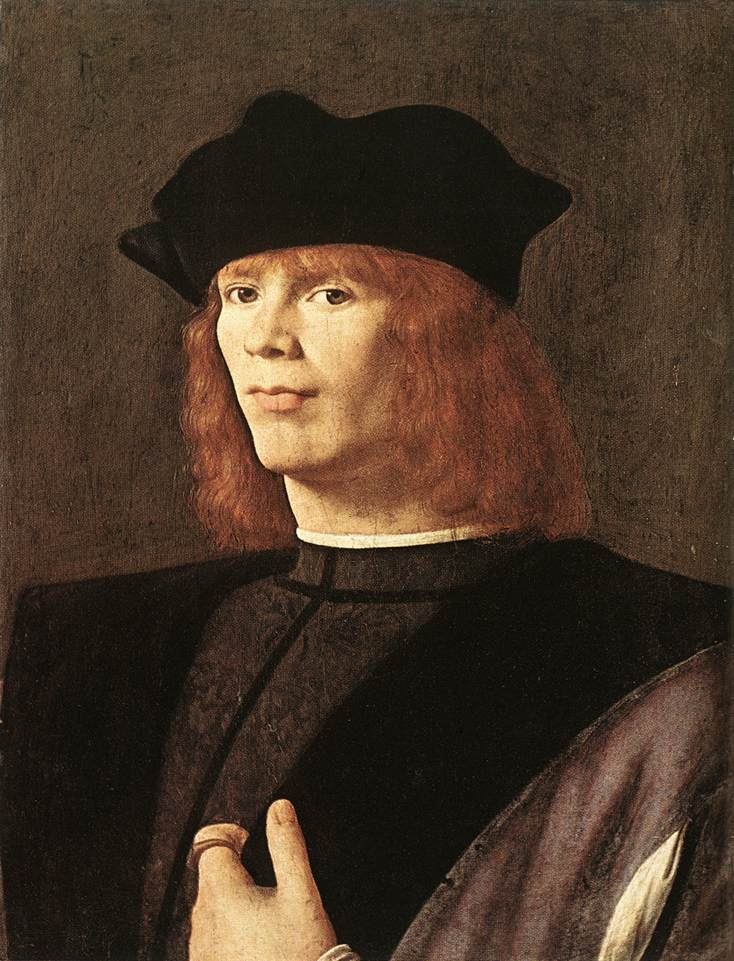
Portrait of a Man, c. 1500 - oil on panel; H.42 cm, W. 32 cm, Brera Gallery

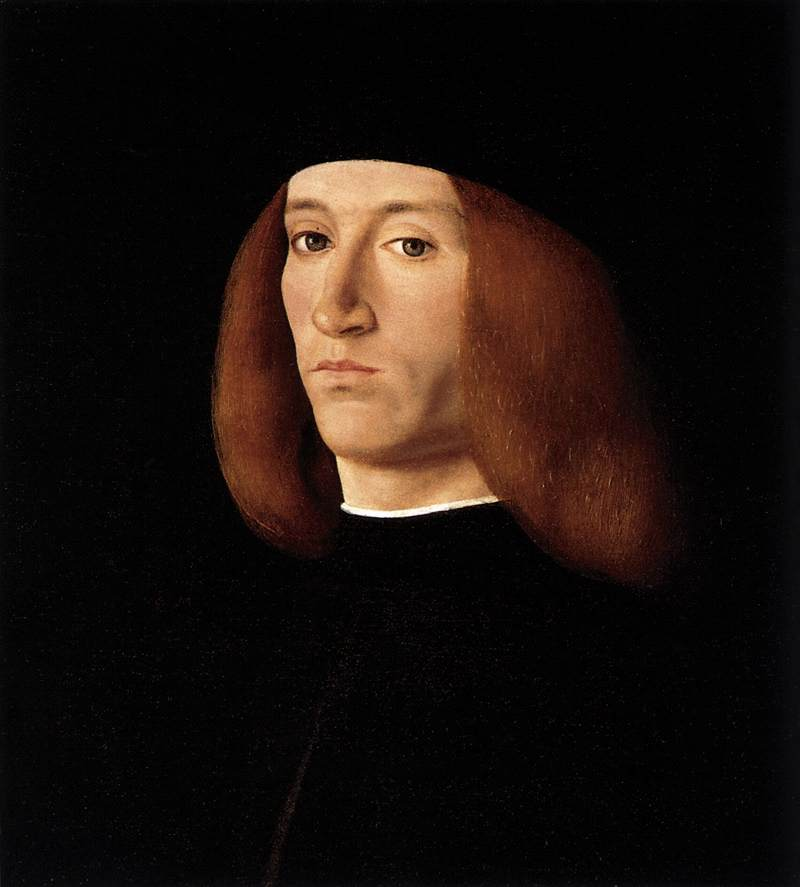
Portrait of a Young Man, after 1490 - Oil on panel; H. 31 cm, W. 28 cm, Thyssen-Bornemisza Museum

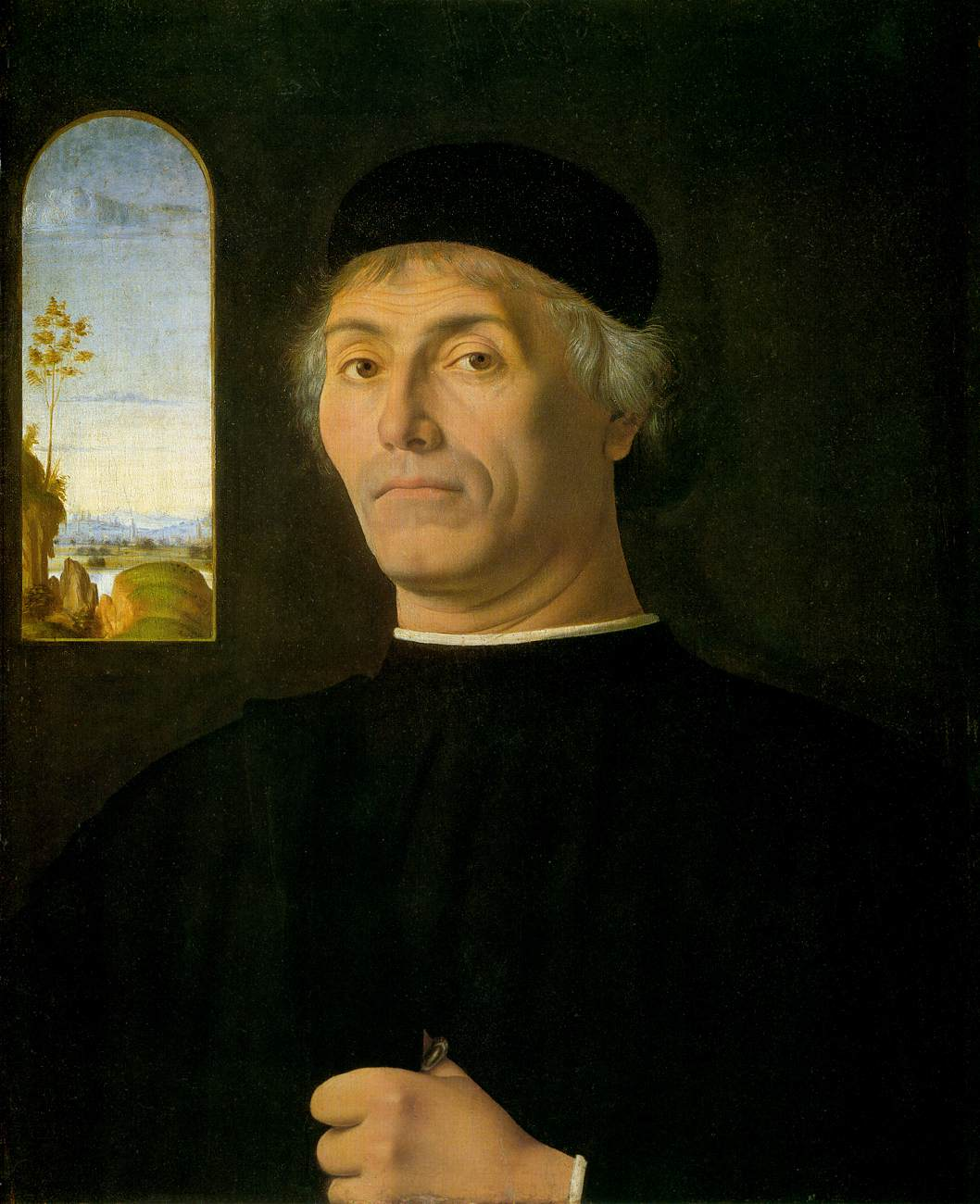
Portrait of a Man, c. 1497 - Oil on wood; H. 48 cm, W. 38 cm, Museum of Fine Arts, Boston

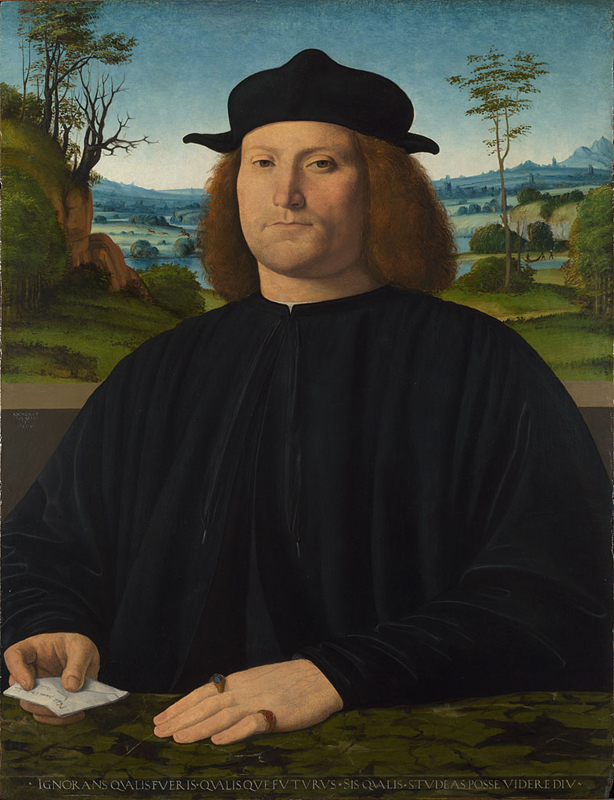
Portrait of Giovanni Cristoforo Longoni, 1505 - oil on panel; H. 79 cm, W. 60,5 cm, National Gallery of London

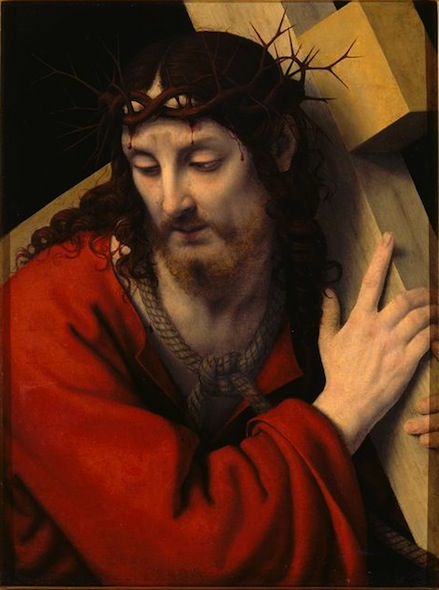
Christ carrying the cross, 1513, oil on panel, 45,5 x 34 cm, Nantes, Musée des Beaux-Arts

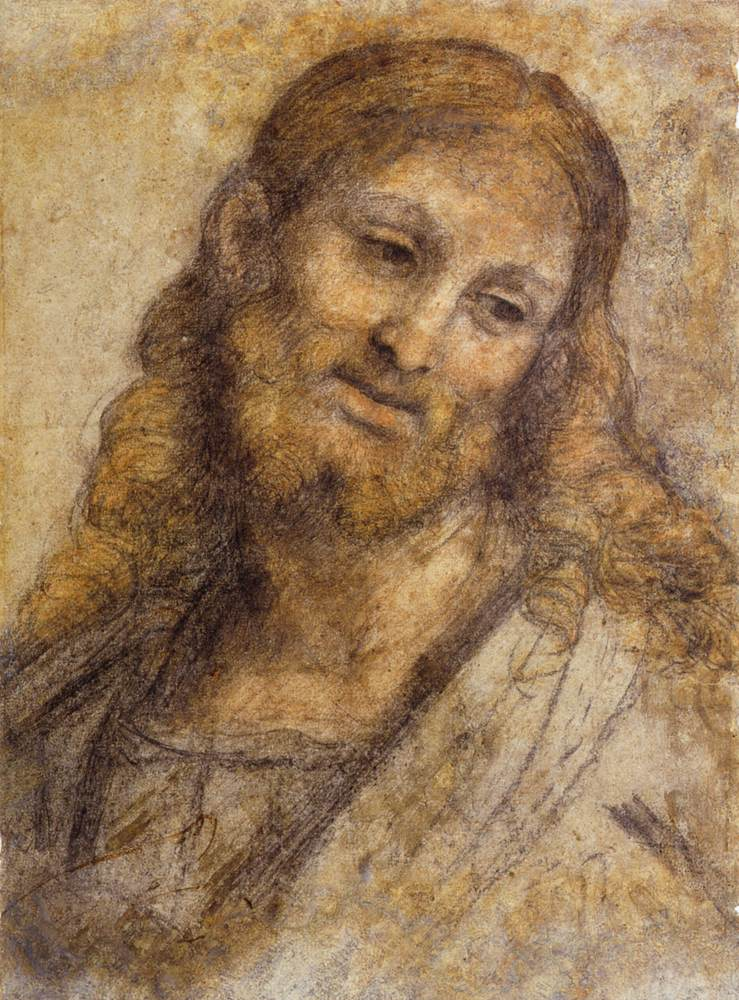
Head of a Bearded Man, 1500-1510 - black, red, and yellow chalk on brownish paper; H. 374 mm, W. 273 mm, Metropolitan Museum

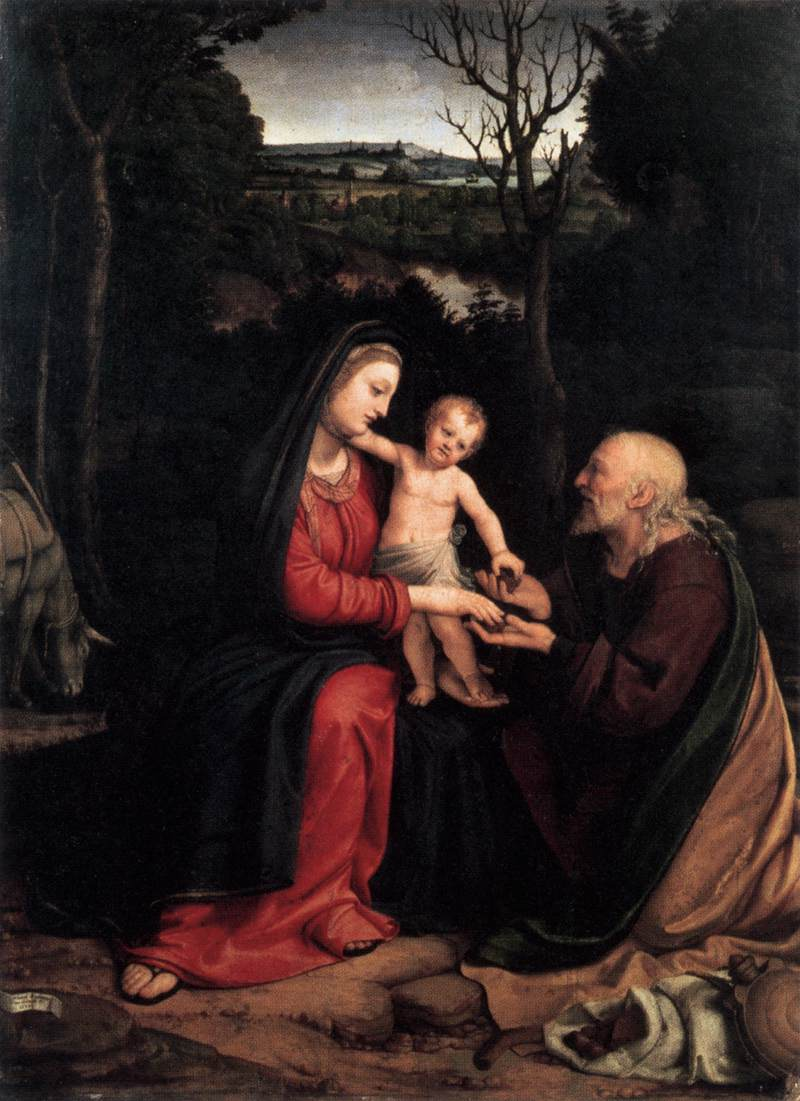
Rest on the Flight into Egypt, 1515 - oil on panel; H. 77 cm, W. 55 cm, Poldi-Pezzoli Museum

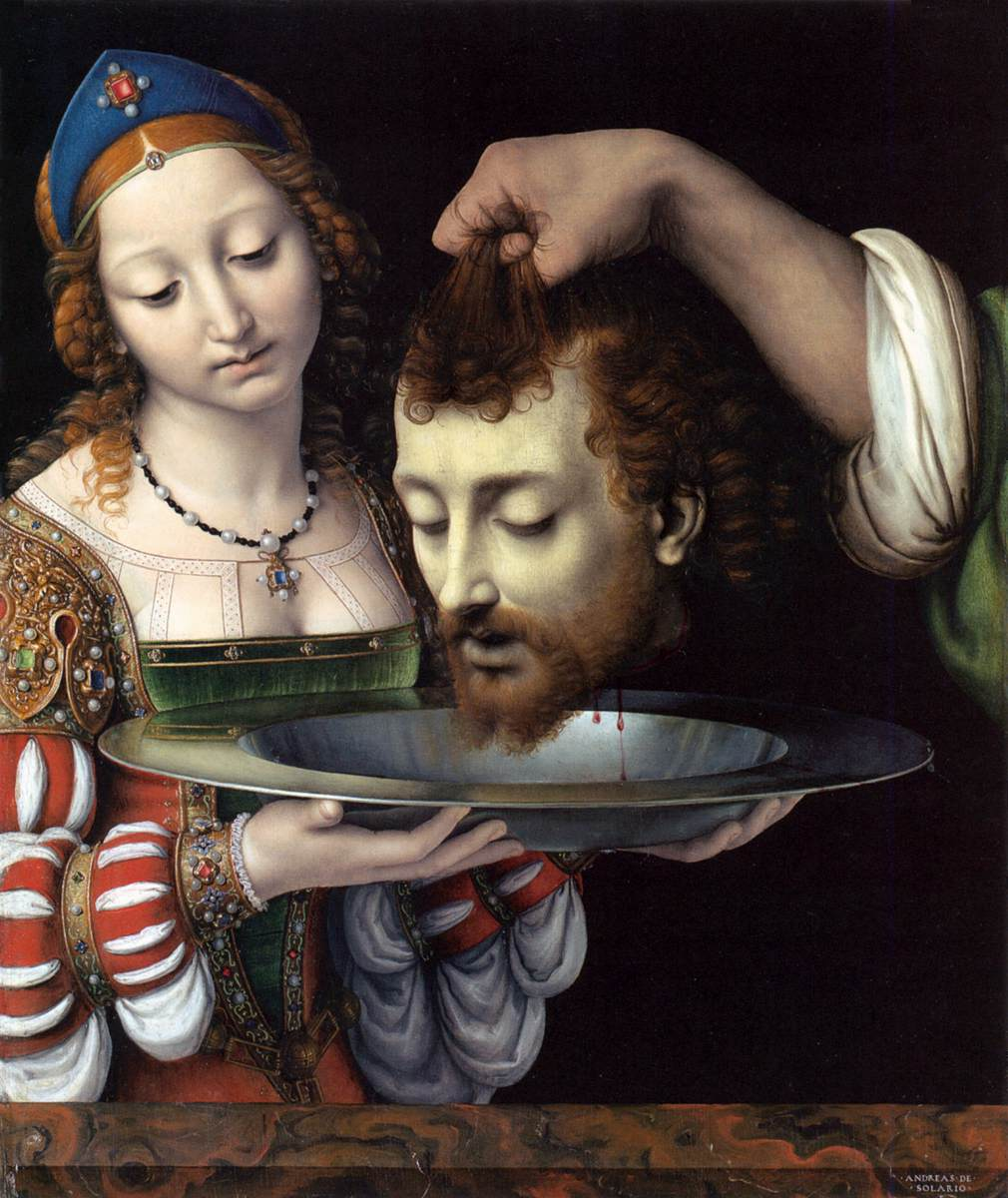
Salome receives the Head of St John the Baptist, 1506-7 - oil on panel; H. 57 cm, W. 47 cm, Metropolitan Museum of Art
