= Madonna with Sleeping Child (Mantegna) =

1465–1470 painting by Andrea Mantegna

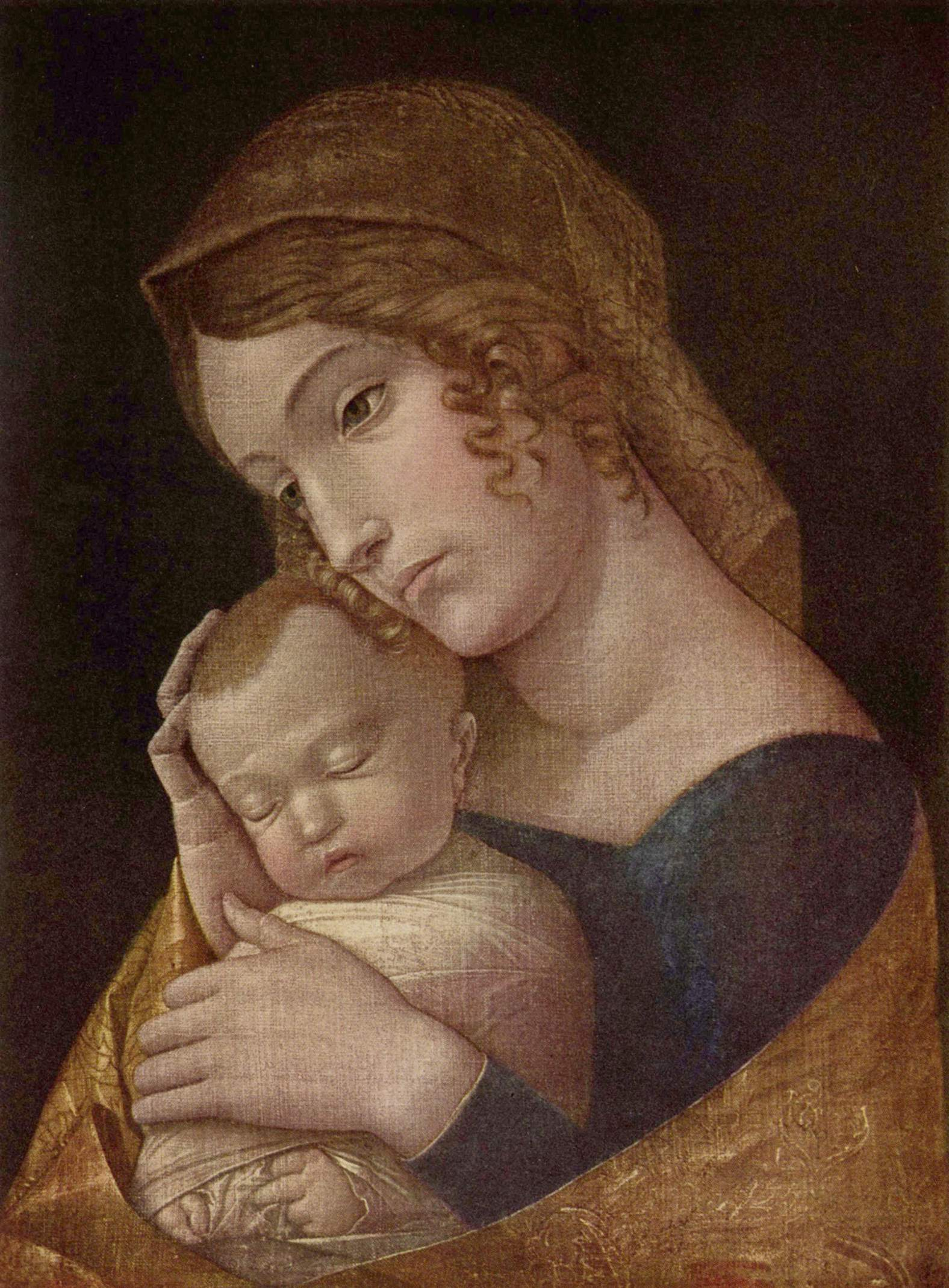
- Artist: Andrea Mantegna
- Year: 1465-1470
- Medium: glue-tempera on canvas
- Dimensions: 43 cm × 32 cm (17 in × 13 in)
- Location: Gemäldegalerie, Berlin

The Madonna with Sleeping Child is a glue-tempera on canvas painting measuring 43 cm by 32 cm. It was painted around 1465-1470 by Andrea Mantegna and is now in the Gemäldegalerie in Berlin.

Intended for private devotion, it dispenses with the two figures' usual haloes in favour of a more intimate, simple and tender approach. Mantegna draws on Donatello's motif of Mary's face touching the child, whilst they are both enveloped in a brocade mantle against a black background.

There is a dialogue about this painting in the novel Lampioon küßt Mädchen und kleine Birken by the German writer Manfred Hausmann.
