= Slingerland (surname) =

Slingerland is a Dutch toponymic surname. It originates in the heerlijkheid of Slingelandt, now covered by the former community of Nederslingeland and the town of Overslingeland in South Holland. Variants are (Van) Slingeland and Slingelandt. Many Americans named Slingerland are descendants of Dutch settler Teunis Cornelis Slingerland (1617, Amsterdam – 1700, Hackensack, New Jersey). Notable people with the name include:

- Cashandra Slingerland (born 1974), South African road cyclist
- H.H. Slingerland (1875–1946), American founder of the Slingerland Drum Company
- James S. Slingerland (1834–1874), American politician, vice governor of Nevada from 1867 to 1871
- Jared Slingerland (born 1984), Canadian guitarist and electronic musician
- John I. Slingerland (1804–1861), United States Representative from New York
- Mark Vernon Slingerland (1864–1909), American entomologist

Van Slingeland(t)

- Cornelis van Slingeland (1635–1686), Dutch portrait painter
- Pieter Cornelisz van Slingelandt (1640–1691), Dutch portrait painter
- Simon van Slingelandt (1664–1736), Grand Pensionary of Holland from 1727 to 1736

== See also ==
- Slingerland Drum Company
- Slingerlands, New York, a hamlet named for the post master William H. Slingerland
