= Dutch Maiden =

Female personification of the Netherlands

Symbol of the Batavian Republic, 1795–1806.

The Dutch Maiden (Dutch: Nederlandse Maagd, Latin: Belgica or Belgia) is a national personification of the Low Countries and - sometime after the secession of the Southern Netherlands - solely of the Dutch Republic, and its successor state the Netherlands. She is typically depicted wearing a Roman garment and with a lion, the Leo Belgicus, by her side. In addition to the symbol of a national maiden, there were also symbolic provincial maidens and town maidens.

The Dutch Maiden has been used as a national symbol since the 16th century. During the Dutch Revolt, a maiden representing the United Provinces of the Netherlands became a recurrent theme in allegorical cartoons. In early depictions she may be shown in the "Garden of Holland", a small garden surrounded by a fence, recalling the medieval hortus conclusus of the Virgin Mary. On 25 May 1694, the States of Holland and West Friesland introduced a uniform coin design for the United Provinces, showing a Dutch Maiden leaning on a bible placed on an altar and holding a lance with the cap of liberty, the Liberty pole.

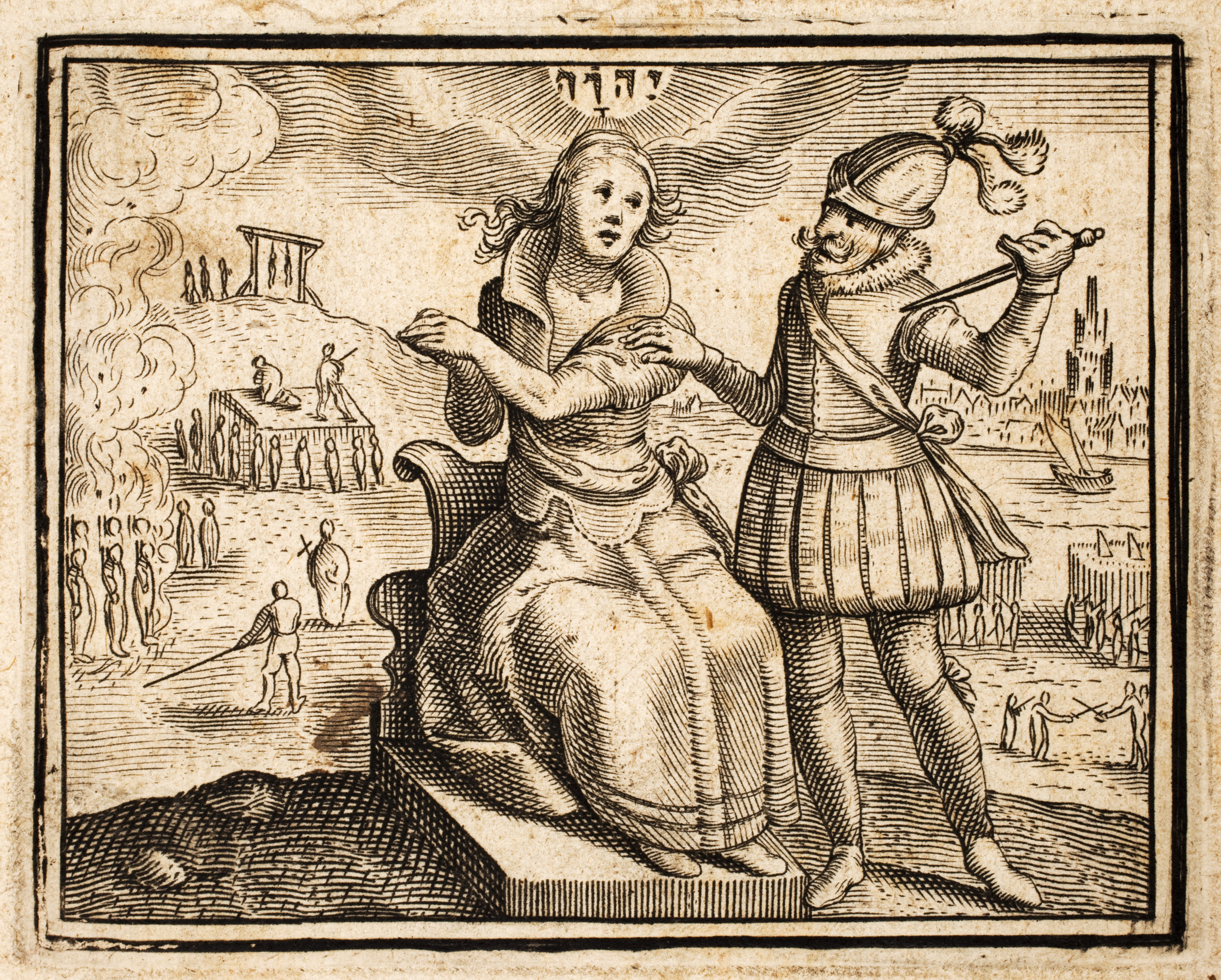
The Dutch maiden threatened by a Spanish soldier. From Gysius: Oorsprong en voortgang, 1616.

Initially carrying a martyr's palm, by the late 17th century she often carries a cap of liberty on a liberty pole, though the hat is a conventional capotain style for the period, rather than the Phrygian cap that later images of liberty personified in other countries used. Alongside the type of depiction with a liberty pole, which is usually costumed in more or less modern styles, images in the Baroque classical dress that was more conventional for such personifications are also found.

== 19th-century and later ==
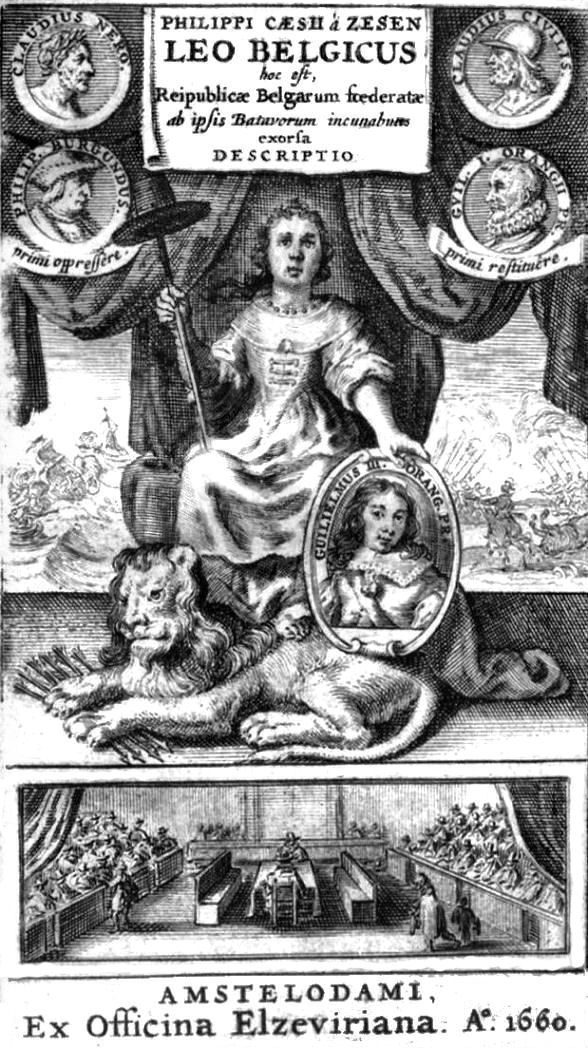
The Dutch Maiden always carries her cap of liberty on a pole, 1660

During the French Revolutionary occupation, the short-lived Batavian Republic adopted the Dutch Maiden as its main symbol. The symbol was depicted on the upper left corner of the Batavian Navy's ensign, with a lion at her feet. In one hand, she holds a shield with the Roman fasces and in the other a lance crowned with the cap of liberty.

The Dutch Maiden continued to be used as a symbol after the foundation of the Kingdom of the Netherlands in 1815. She was integrated into a number of 19th century monuments, including:

- the statue in the centre of Plein 1813 in The Hague;
- the statue commemorating the Battle of Heiligerlee, and
- the statue on the Nieuwemarkt in Rotterdam.

== Maiden as a provincial or town symbol ==
Starting around the time of the Renaissance, it was not uncommon for a Dutch province to be symbolized by the image of a maiden, e.g. "the Maiden of Holland".

A "town maiden" (stedenmaagd) was sometimes used to symbolize a Dutch town, e.g. "the Maiden of Dordrecht".

=== Maiden of Dordrecht ===
On a relief on the 16th century Groothoofdspoort in Dordrecht, the Maiden of Dordrecht, holding the heraldic shield of Dordrecht, is seated in the symbolical Garden of Holland. She is surrounded by the heraldic shields of 15 cities. The same theme was the subject of a 1596 gift to the St. Janskerk in Gouda by the Dordrecht city council. From 19 to 23 July 1572, Dordrecht had been the scene of the first independent meeting of the provinces rebelling against Spanish rule.

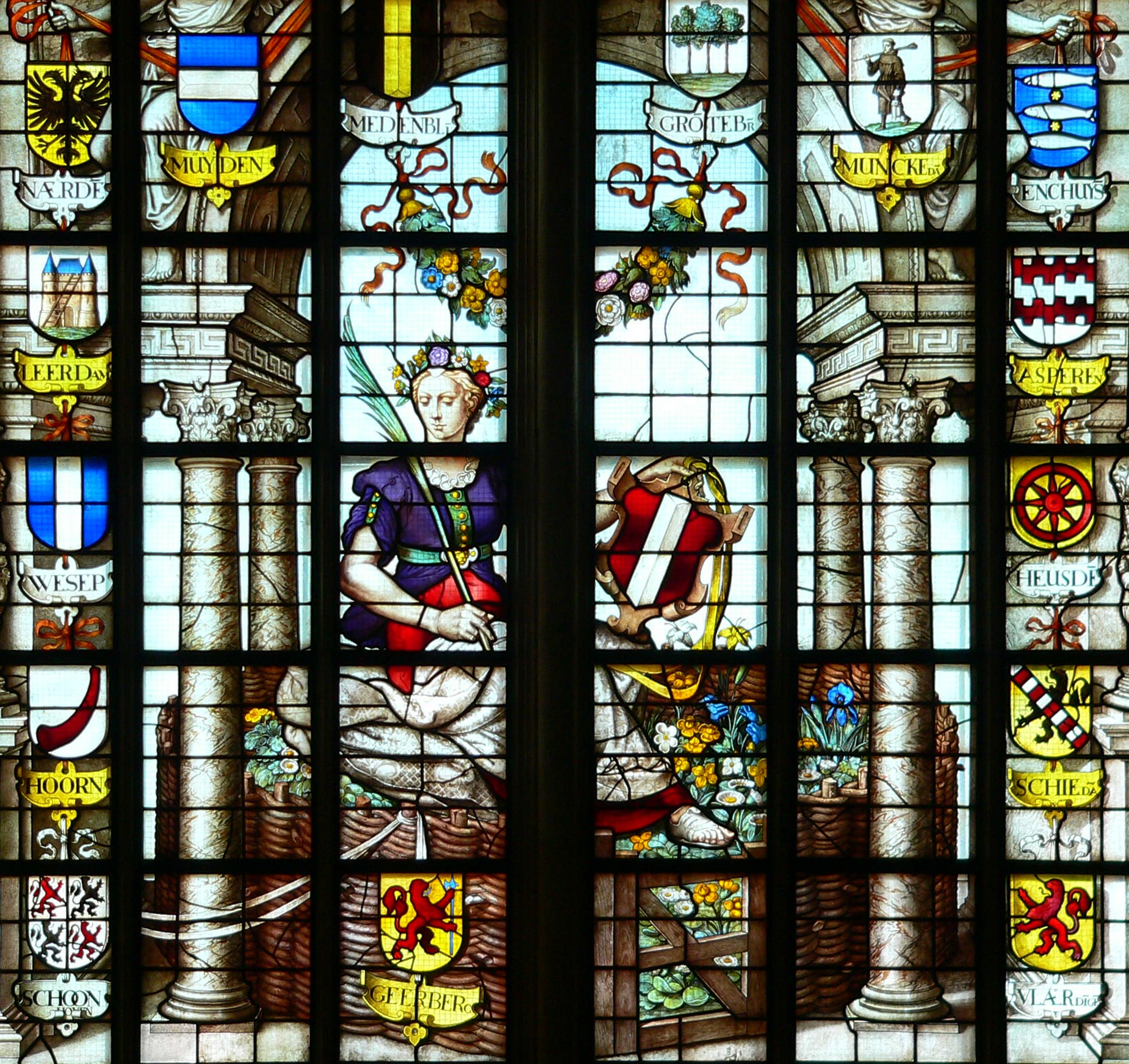
Dordrecht Maiden, 1596, stained glass window designed by Gerrit Gerritsz Cuyp in the Janskerk, Gouda.

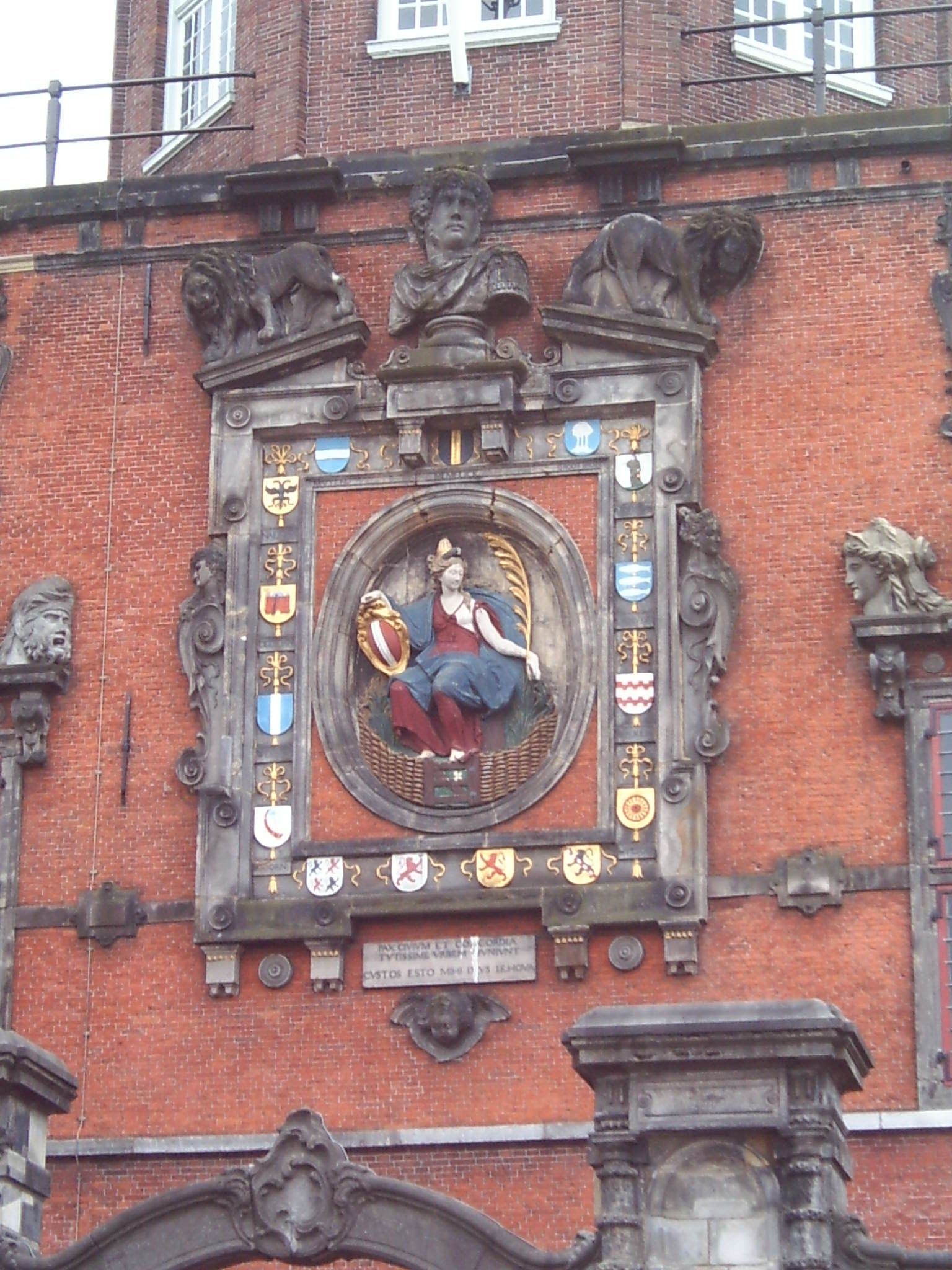
Maiden of Dordrecht depicted in the Groothoofdspoort in Dordrecht in 1618.

In these symbols of Dordrecht, the heraldic shields are (clockwise from Geertruidenberg, the city shield on the "gate" of the garden) for the following towns: Geertruidenberg, Schoonhoven, Hoorn, Weesp, Leerdam, Naarden, Muiden, Medemblik, Grootebroek, Monnickendam, Enkhuizen, Asperen, Heusden, Schiedam and Vlaardingen.

=== Gallery ===
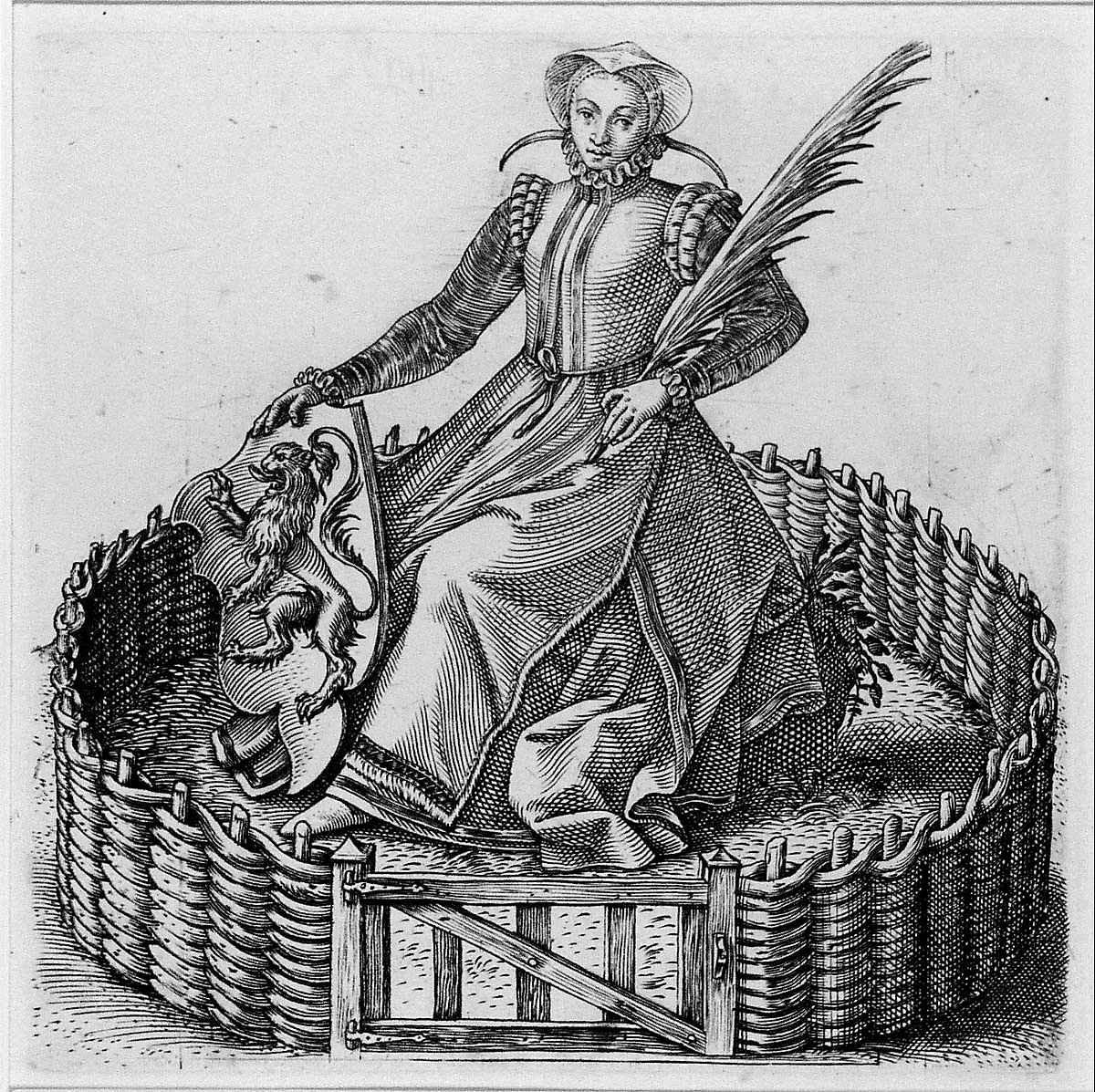
Dutch Maiden in the garden of Holland, 1563, by Philips Galle

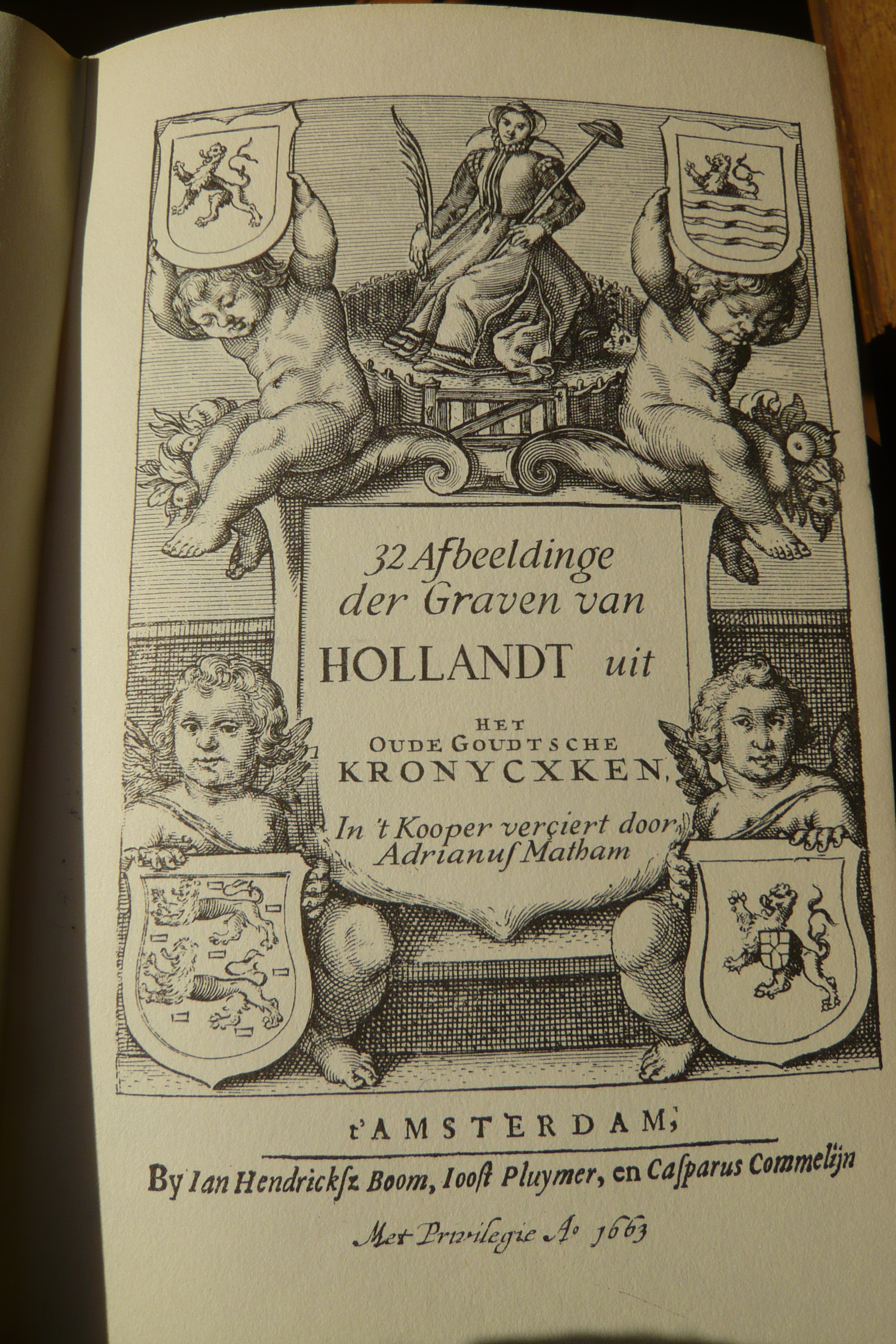
Same theme appearing in 1663, in Adriaen Matham's Counts of Holland series

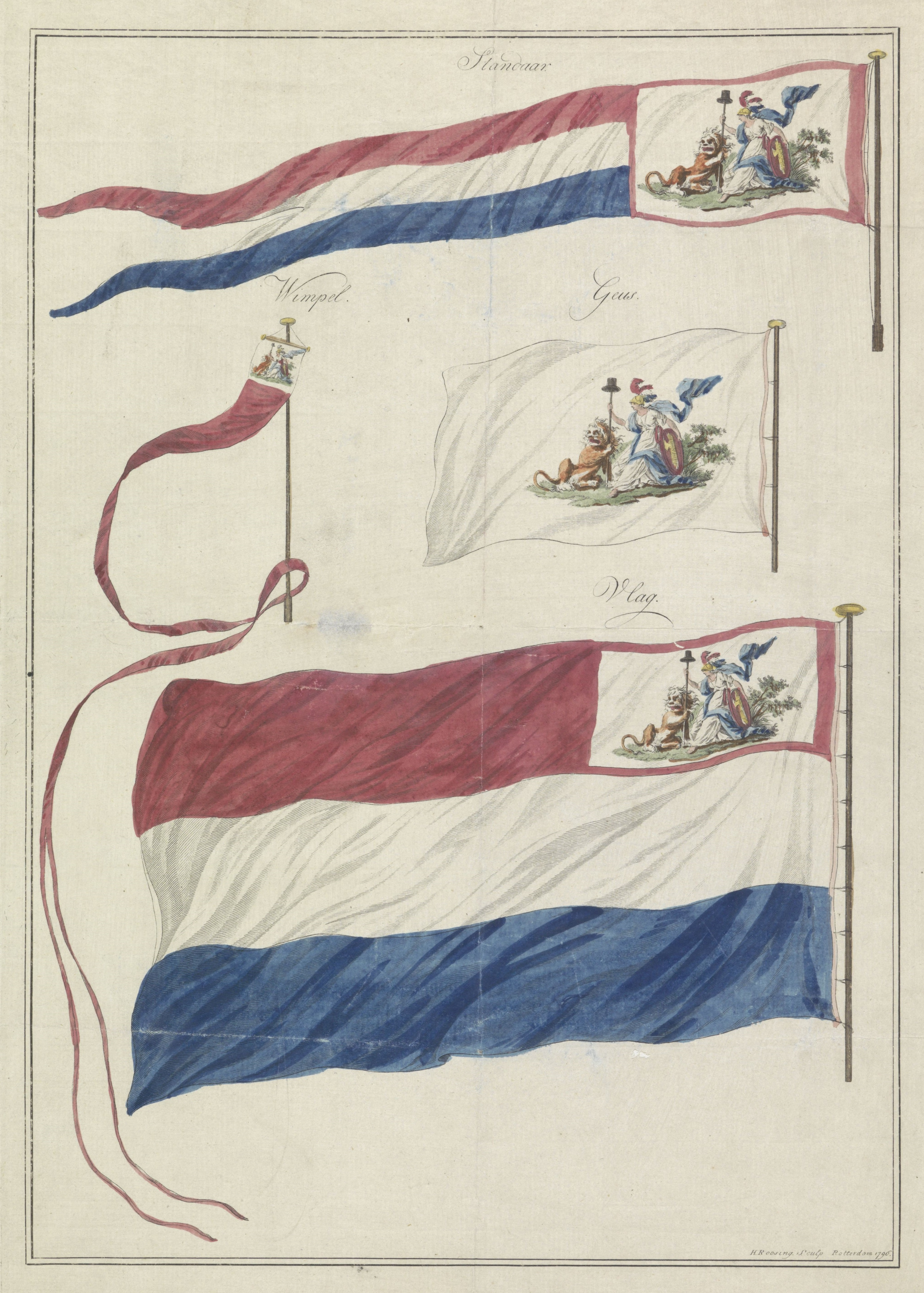
Flags of the Batavian Republic.

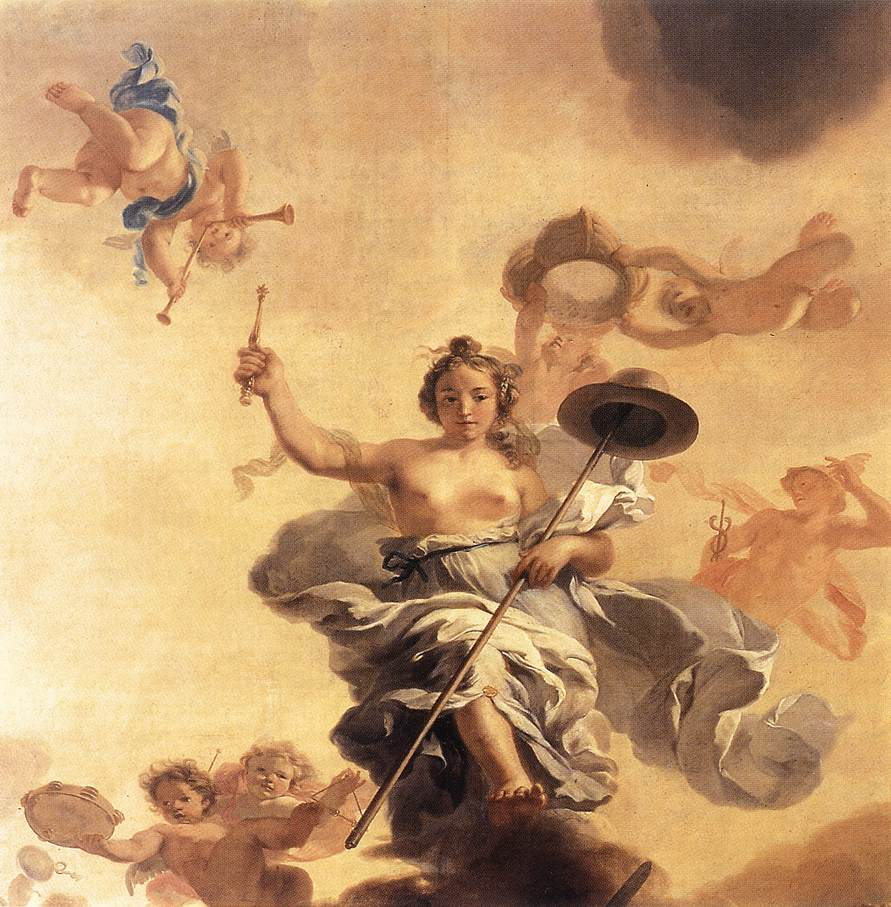
Gérard de Lairesse, Allegory of the Freedom of Trade (glorifying the De Graeff family' as the protector of the Republican state), 1672

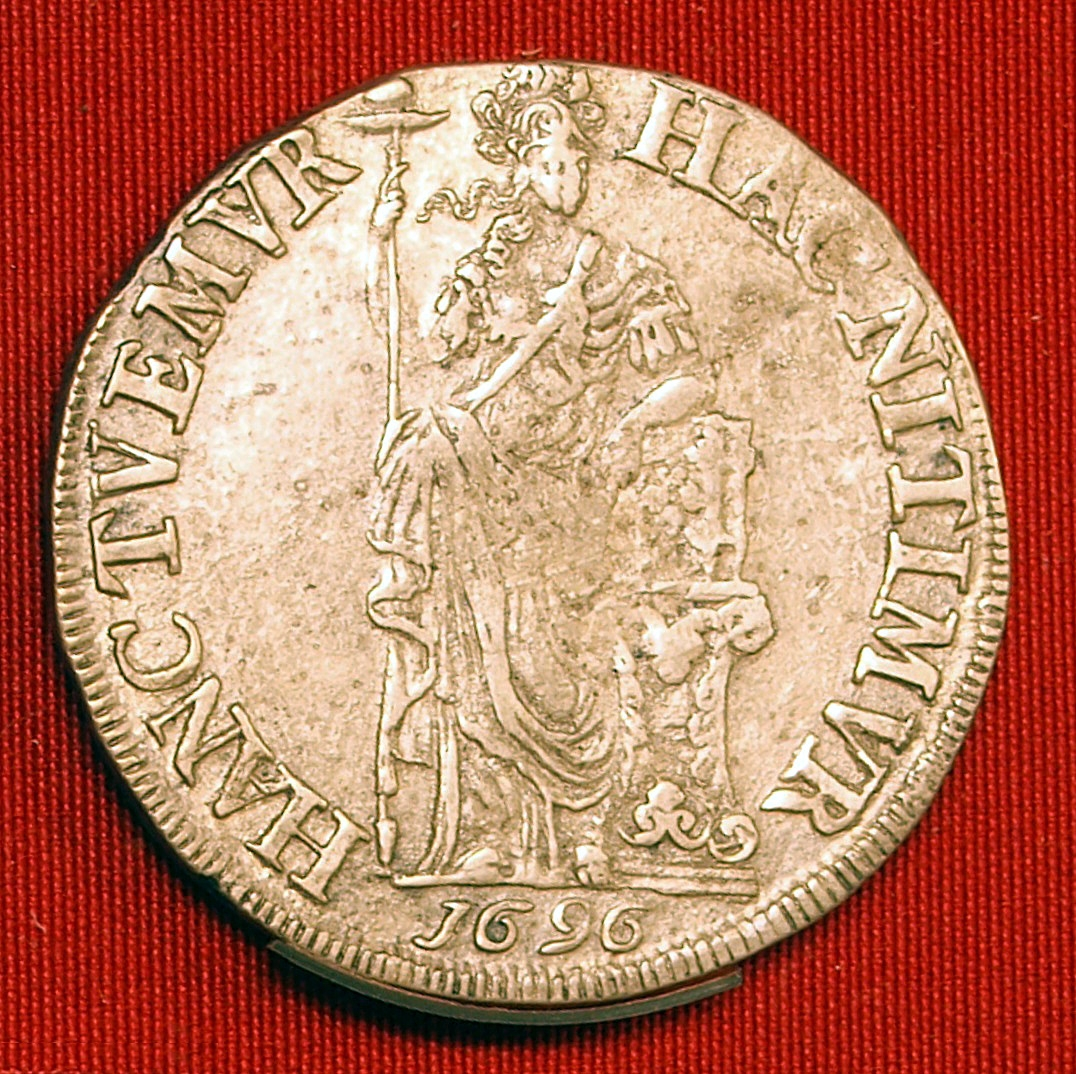
Back of 1696 Leeuwarden silver half 3 guilder coin, with the Latin inscription "HANC TUEMUR, HAC NITIMUR" ("We protect her; she supports us").

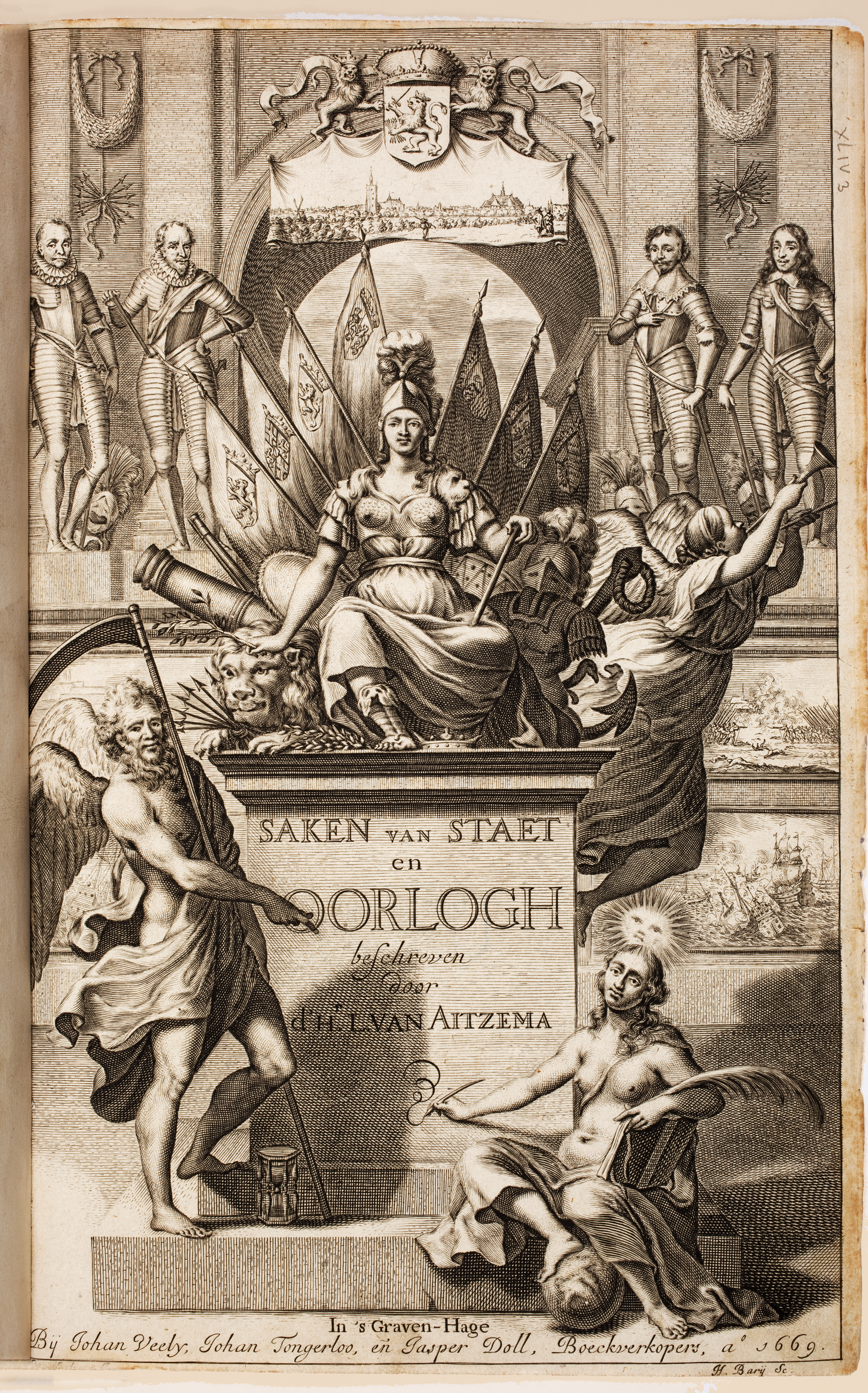
Classical and military dress, book frontispiece, c. 1670

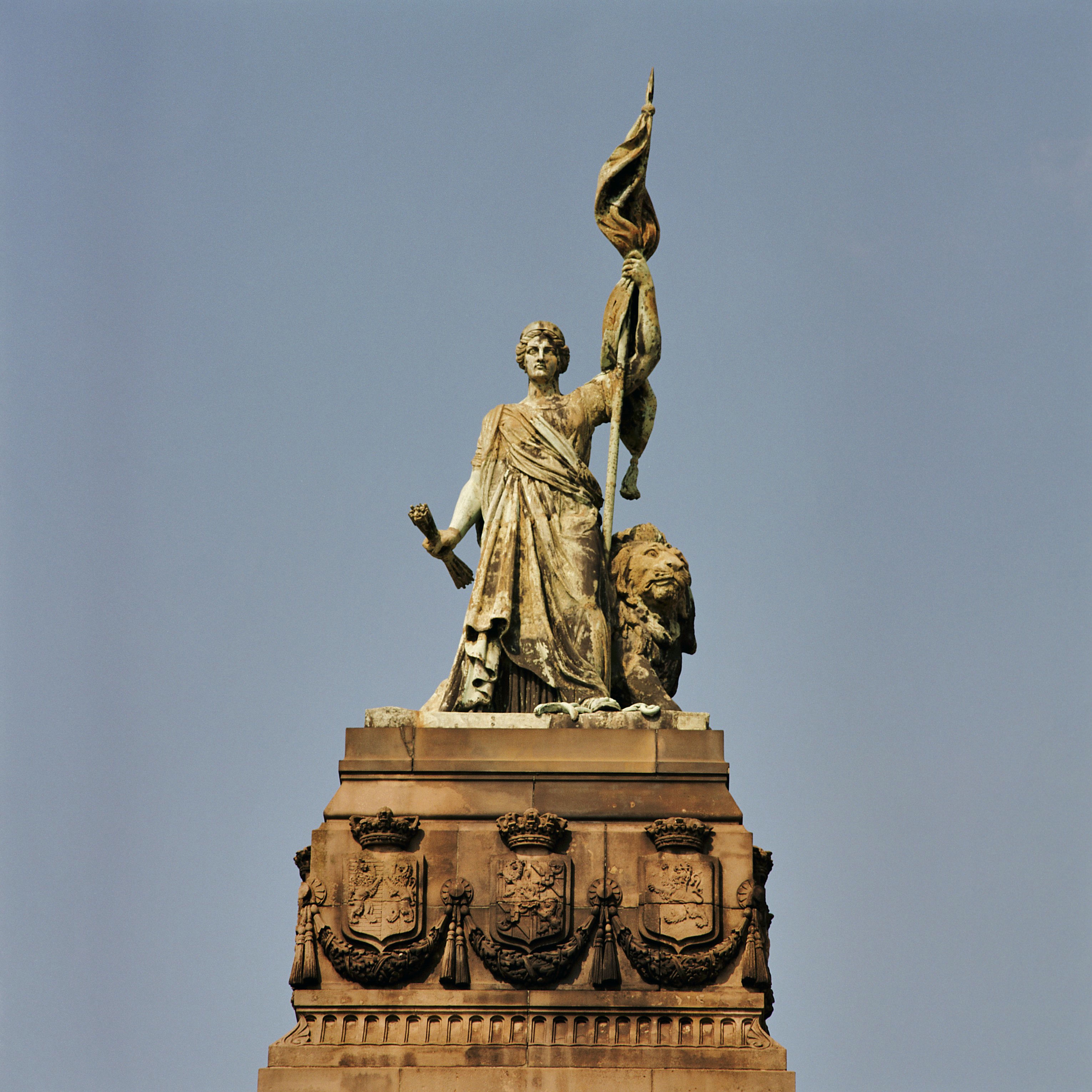
Alternative classical style, at the national monument, Plein 1813, The Hague.

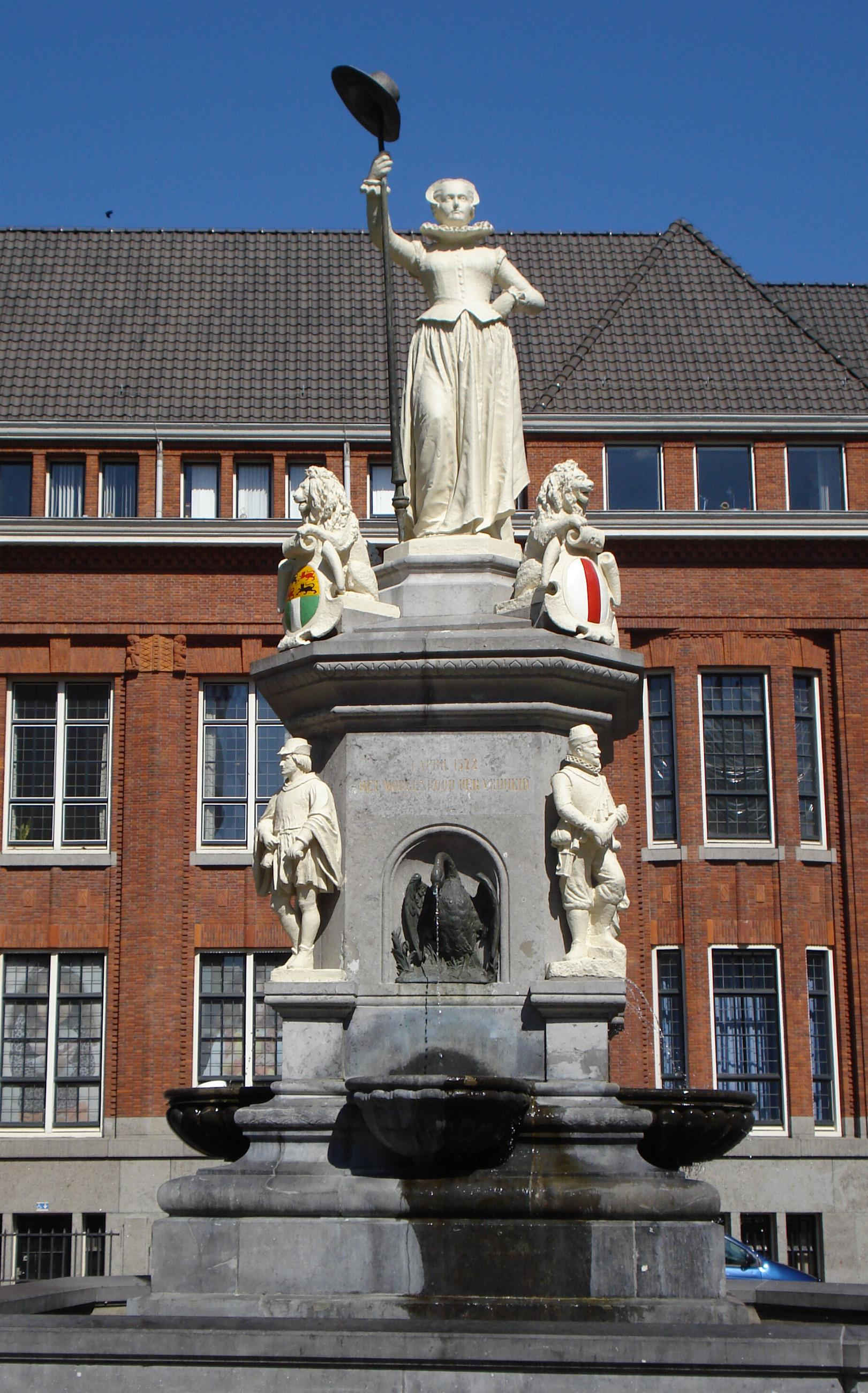
Statue in Rotterdam, 1874, hat and costume in styles from the start of the Dutch Revolt.

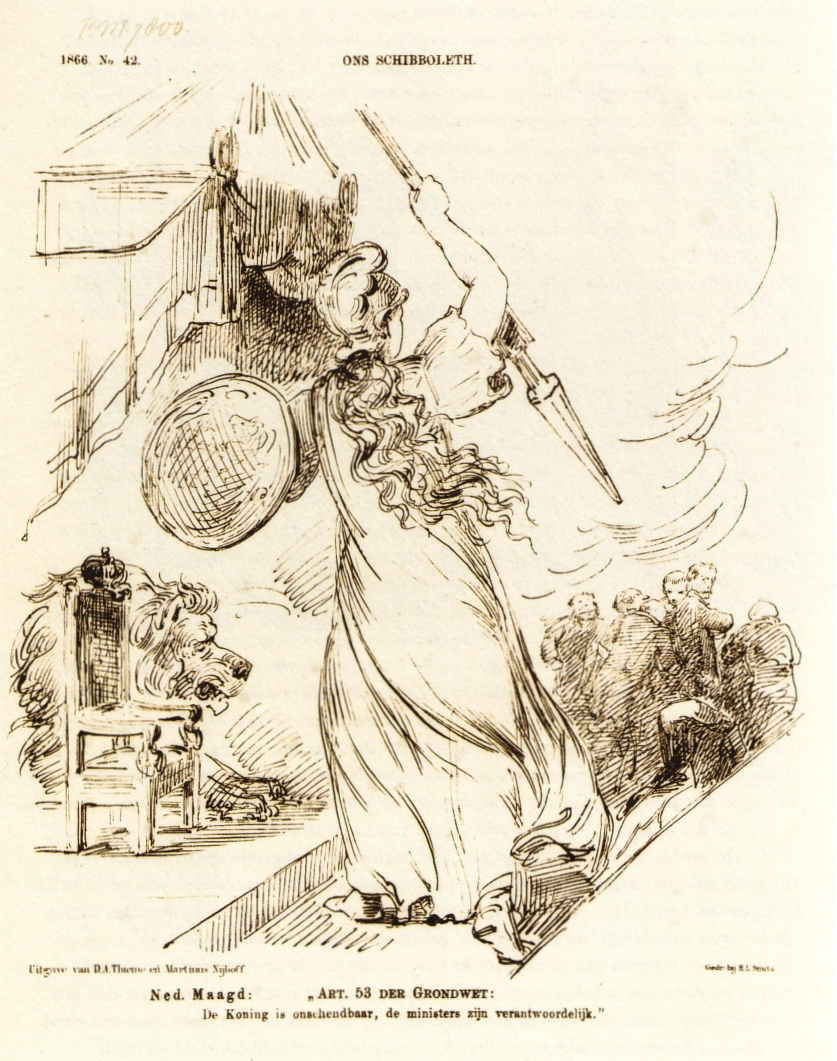
Dutch Maiden in a political cartoon. Per the 1848 Dutch Constitution "The King is immune, the ministers are responsible".,

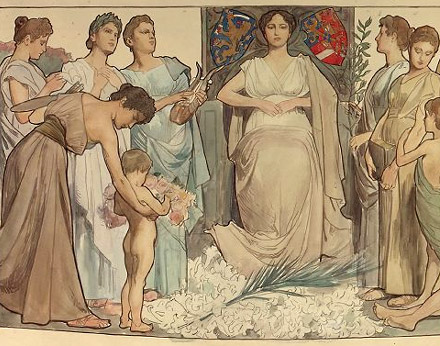
Dutch Maiden on a design for the Golden Coach, by Nicolaas van der Waay, 1898.

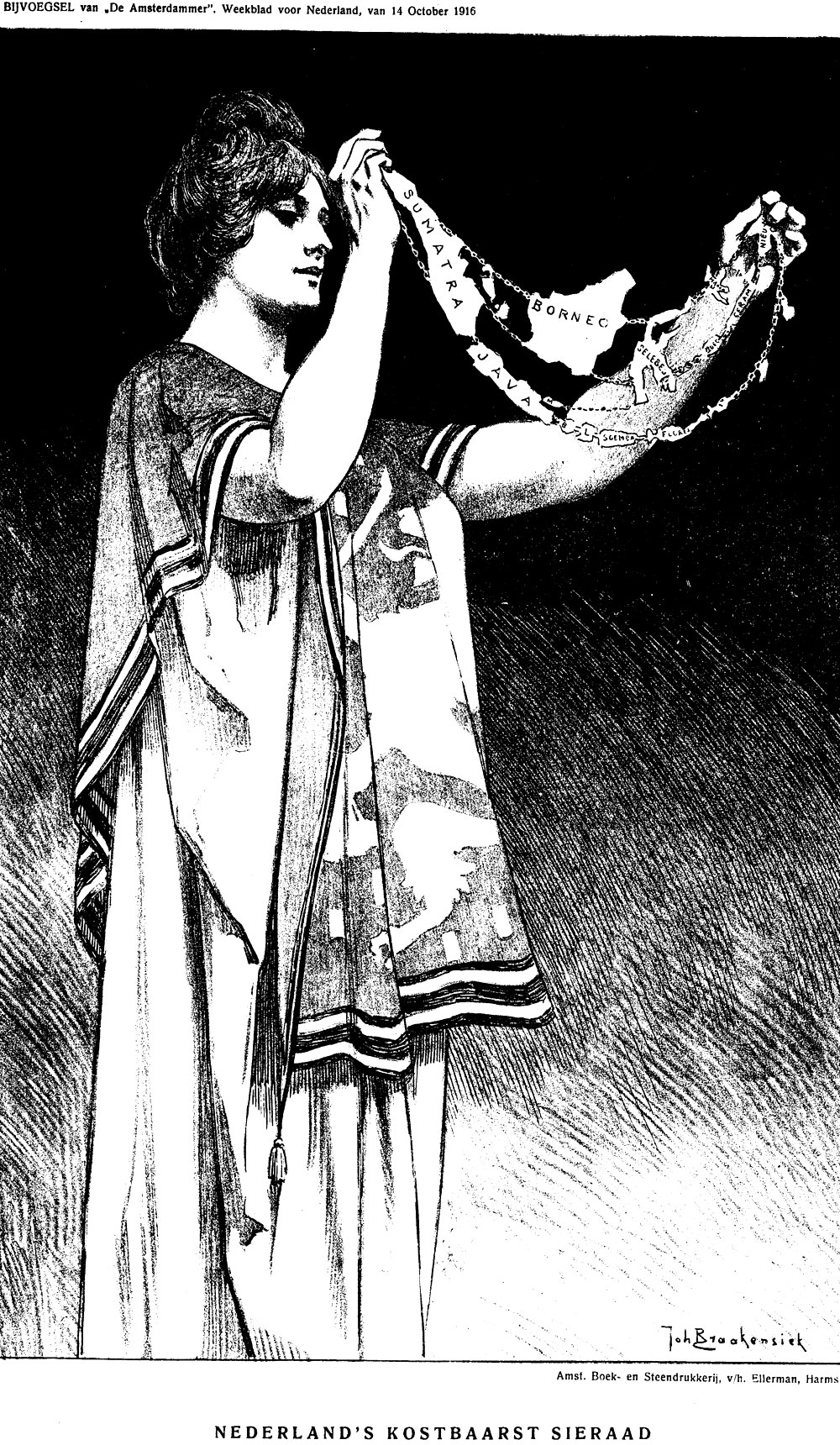
Dutch Imperial Maiden (1916) with "The Netherlands' costliest jewel", a necklace representing the Dutch East Indies.
