= Giessen-Nieuwkerk =

Town in South Holland, Netherlands

Coordinates: 51°50′41″N 4°53′36″E

Giessen-Nieuwkerk (Dutch pronunciation: [ˌɣisəˈniukɛr(ə)k]) is a former town in the Dutch province of South Holland. It is now called Giessenburg. It is also the name of a former municipality, that existed until 1957, when it merged with Peursum to form the new municipality of Giessenburg.

The name means "Giessen-New Church", and refers to the small river Giessen. The town Giessen-Oudekerk ("Giessen-Old Church") is located 2 km southwest.
