= Cornelis van Slingeland =

Dutch painter

Cornelis van Slingeland (1635 in Dordrecht – 1686 in Dordrecht), was a Dutch Golden Age painter.

According to Houbraken he was both a cook and a painter, known by the bentname "Zeehaan" (Sea-rooster, or Sea-cock) for going to Rome twice by sea. He lived in Dordrecht "by de Groothoofdspoort, over 't Ossenhoofd".

According to the RKD he was a portrait painter who buried a child in 1666 in Dordrecht, which indicated he had settled there. He ran a kitchen for feeding the poor.

He was possibly related to Pieter Cornelisz van Slingelandt. No known works survive.
