= Adriaen van Gaesbeeck =

Dutch painter (1621–1650)

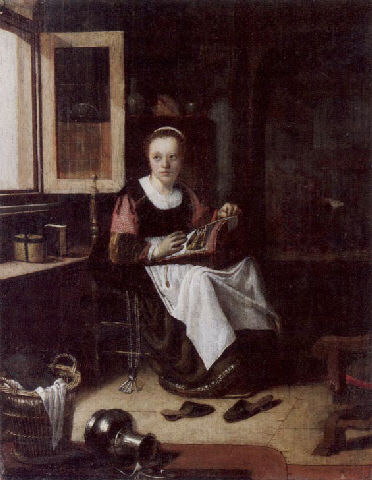
The Seamstress

Adriaen van Gaesbeeck (22 August 1621 – 11 February 1650) was a Dutch painter of genre subjects and portraits. His works, which are rare, are in the manner of Gerard Dou and Pieter van Slingeland. The Berlin Gallery possesses The Seamstress, and the Amsterdam Museum a portrait of a young man.
