= Gerrit Gerritsz. Cuyp =

Dutch painter

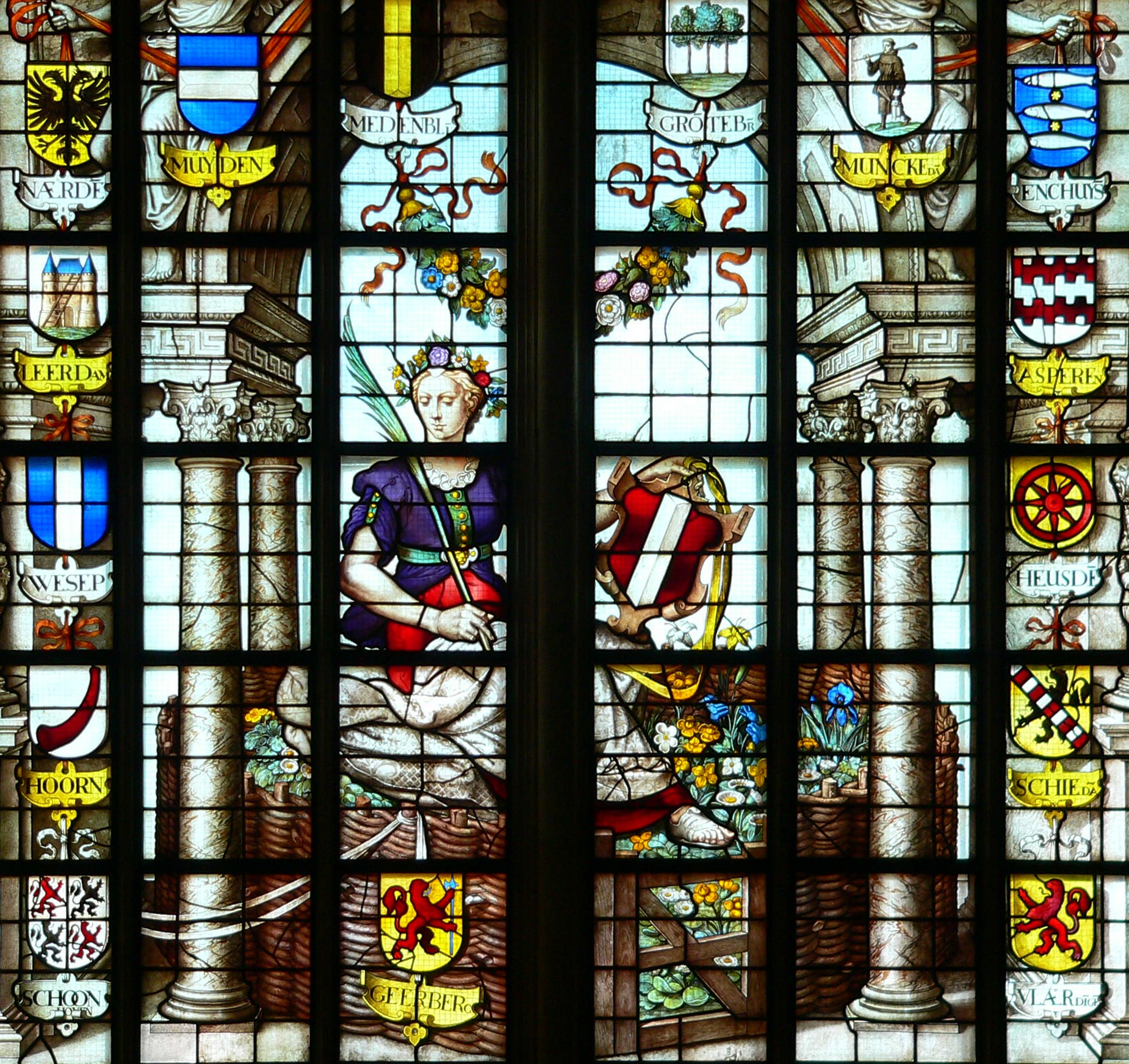
Detail of Glass 3 in the St. Janskerk, Gouda with the Dordrecht Maiden in the Garden of Holland

Gerrit Gerritszoon (Note: Abbreviated as Gerritsz.) Cuyp or Cuijp (c. 1565–1644) was a Dutch Golden Age painter and stained glass cartoon draughtsman.

== Biography ==
According to the RKD he was born in Venlo and moved to Dordrecht before 19 January 1585, when he married and became master glazier in the Dordrecht Guild of St. Luke. Judging by the ages of contemporary master glaziers, he has been estimated to have been born around 1565. He was the father of the painters Jacob Gerritsz. Cuyp (by his first marriage) and Benjamin Gerritsz. Cuyp (by his second marriage), and the grandfather of Aelbert Cuyp. He married a total of 5 times and had 11 children in Dordrecht. He became official glass painter for the city of Dordrecht and obtained various commissions recorded in the city archives, though none survive today. His glass design for window nr. 3, a commission from the Dordrecht council for their gift to the city of Gouda in the St. Janskerk in Gouda, has been preserved and according to their archives he was paid 36 guilders for this window, which was 6 guilders more than the average rate. According to their archives, Dordrecht gave a similar stained glass window for which this same cartoon design was lent out for the church in Edam in 1606, which Cuyp did not execute himself. That window also survives today. In addition to these windows, he also received payments in 1605 for the church in Woudrichem (for ƒ 180) and in 1618 for the "new church of Niervaart" in Klundert (for ƒ 100). His design for Woudrichem has not survived, since the St. Martinus kerk there lost part of its tower in 1717 and the same storm would have taken out the windows. His design for Klundert has also not survived, since after the previous church had been dismantled in 1616, the next church that Klundert saw built (which presumably contained this window), burned down in 1737.

Besides window designs, he was also an oil painter, as evidenced by payments to him totalling ƒ 824 for various (unspecified) painting commissions.

Cuyp died at Dordrecht.

== Gouda glass 3 ==
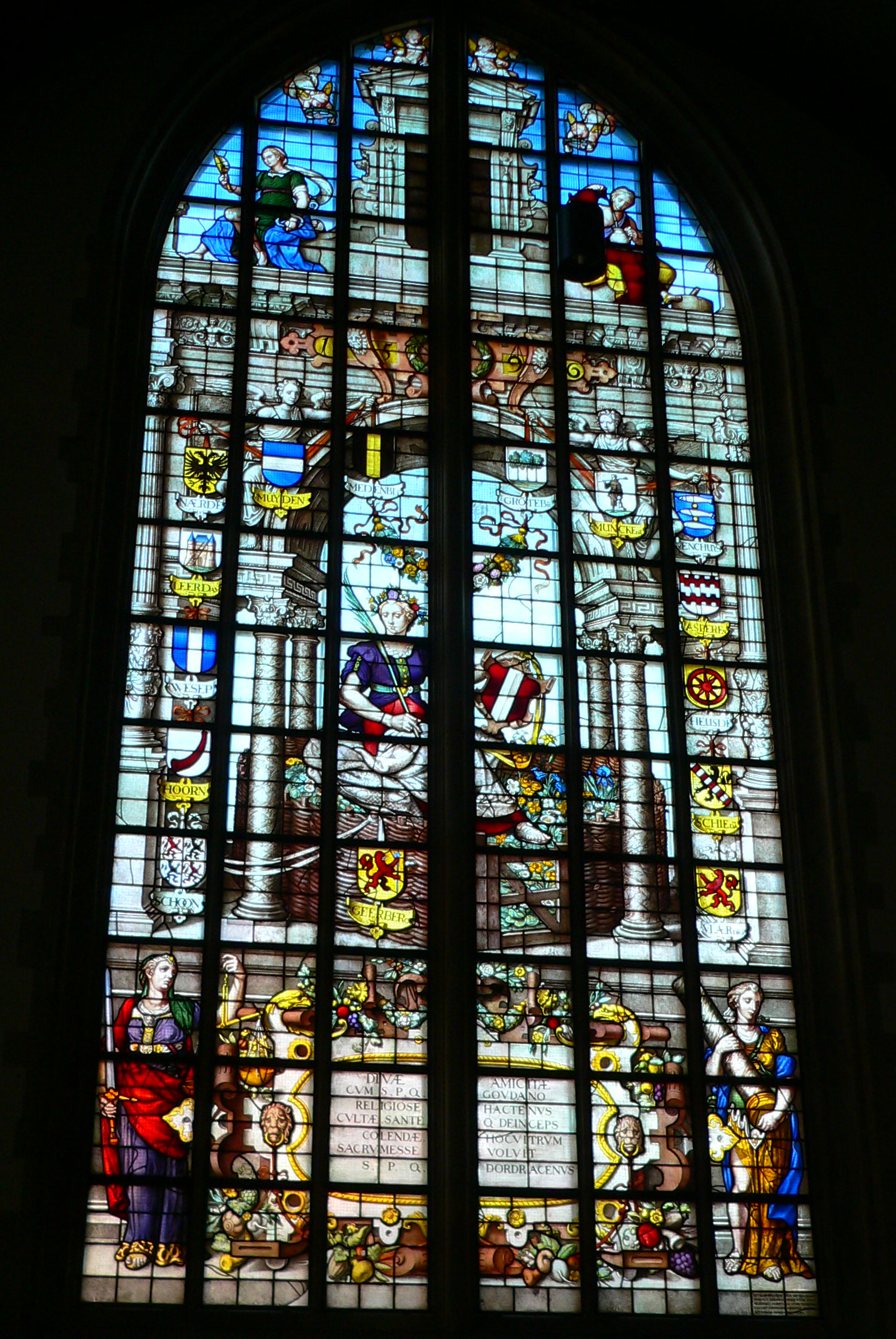
whole window

The choice of subject for Cuyp's window in Gouda, the Dordrecht Maiden, was a typical theme for a Dutch city council. From the renaissance period onwards, Dutch cities symbolised themselves with effigies of a stedenmaagd, or town maiden. The Dordrecht council must have been satisfied with Cuyp's design, because on a relief on the Groothoofdspoort (1618) in Dordrecht, the same theme was used by the sculptor Gillis Huppe. Dordrecht had been the scene of the first independent meeting of the rebelling States of the Netherlands against Spanish rule during 19–23 July 1572. In the stained glass window, the city names are placed under their shields. These names are (clockwise from Geertruidenberg, the city shield on the "gate" of the garden): Geertruidenberg, followed by Schoonhoven, Hoorn, Weesp, Leerdam, Naarden, Muiden, Medemblik, Grootebroek, Monnickendam, Enkhuizen, Asperen, Heusden, Schiedam, and Vlaardingen. The choice of placing Geertruidenberg on the gate of the garden differs from the Groothoofdspoort, where the shield is placed under the garden opposite the shield of Vlaardingen. Geertruidenberg had joined the union three years before the glass was ordered in 1593 when the town was liberated from Spanish rule by Prince Maurits.
