= Jacob van der Sluys =

Dutch painter (d. 1732)

- Born: c.1660 Leiden
- Died: 15 September 1732; Leiden

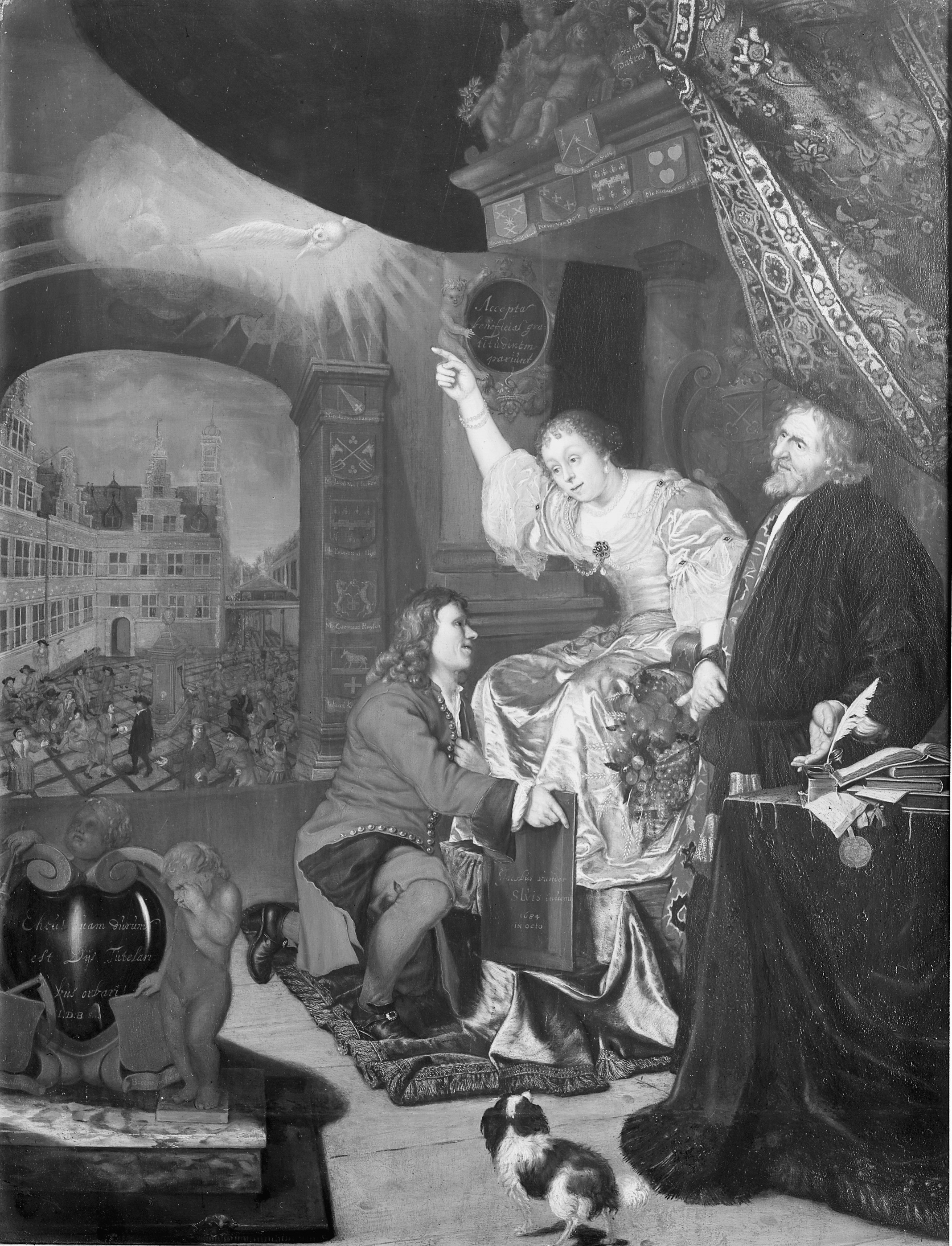
Gratitude of the Artist on leaving the Heilige Geest Weeshuis in Leiden, 1940.

Jacob van der Sluys or Sluis (c.1660 – 15 September 1732) was a Dutch Golden Age painter.

Sluys was born in Leiden and spent his childhood at the orphanage, for which he made several paintings still located there. He was registered in the Leiden Guild of St. Luke as a pupil of Jacob Toorenvliet and Pieter Cornelisz van Slingelandt.

Sluys served in several roles for the Leiden guild after his marriage. He is known for portraits and allegories. He died in Leiden.
