= Giessenburg =

- Town
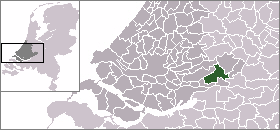

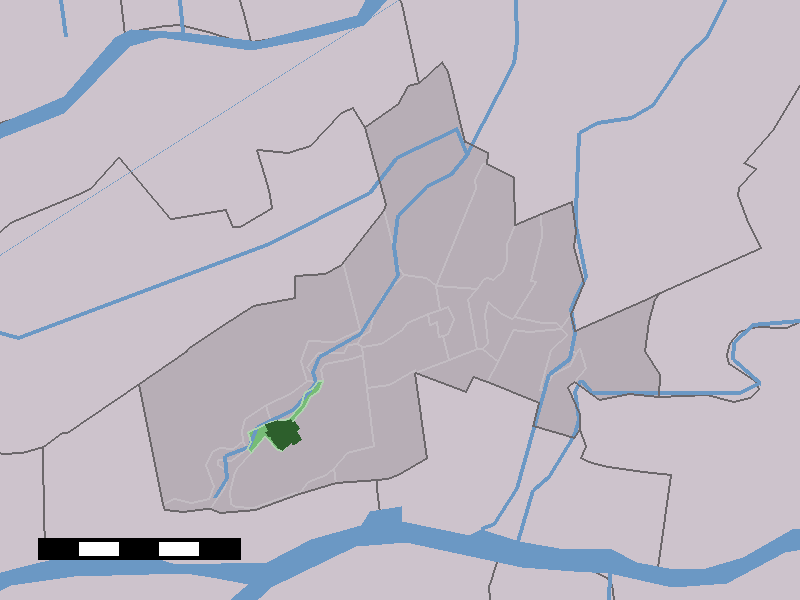
- The town centre (dark green) and the statistical district (light green) of Giessenburg in the municipality of Giessenlanden.
- Coordinates: 51°51′0″N 4°53′23″E
- Country: Netherlands
- Province: South Holland
- Municipality: Molenlanden

Population (2010)
  - Total: 4,889
- Time zone: UTC+1 (CET)
  - Summer (DST): UTC+2 (CEST)

Giessenburg (Dutch pronunciation: [ˈɣisə(m)bʏr(ə)x]) is a town in the Dutch province of South Holland. It is a part of the municipality of Molenlanden, and lies about 6 km west of Gorinchem.

Giessenburg was a separate municipality between 1957 and 1986. It was created in a merger of the municipalities Giessen-Nieuwkerk and Peursum.

In 2010, the town of Giessenburg had 4889 inhabitants. The built-up area of the town was 0.43 km², and contained 911 residences. The statistical area "Giessenburg", which also can include the peripheral parts of the village, as well as the surrounding countryside, has a population of around 2900.
