= Groothoofdspoort =

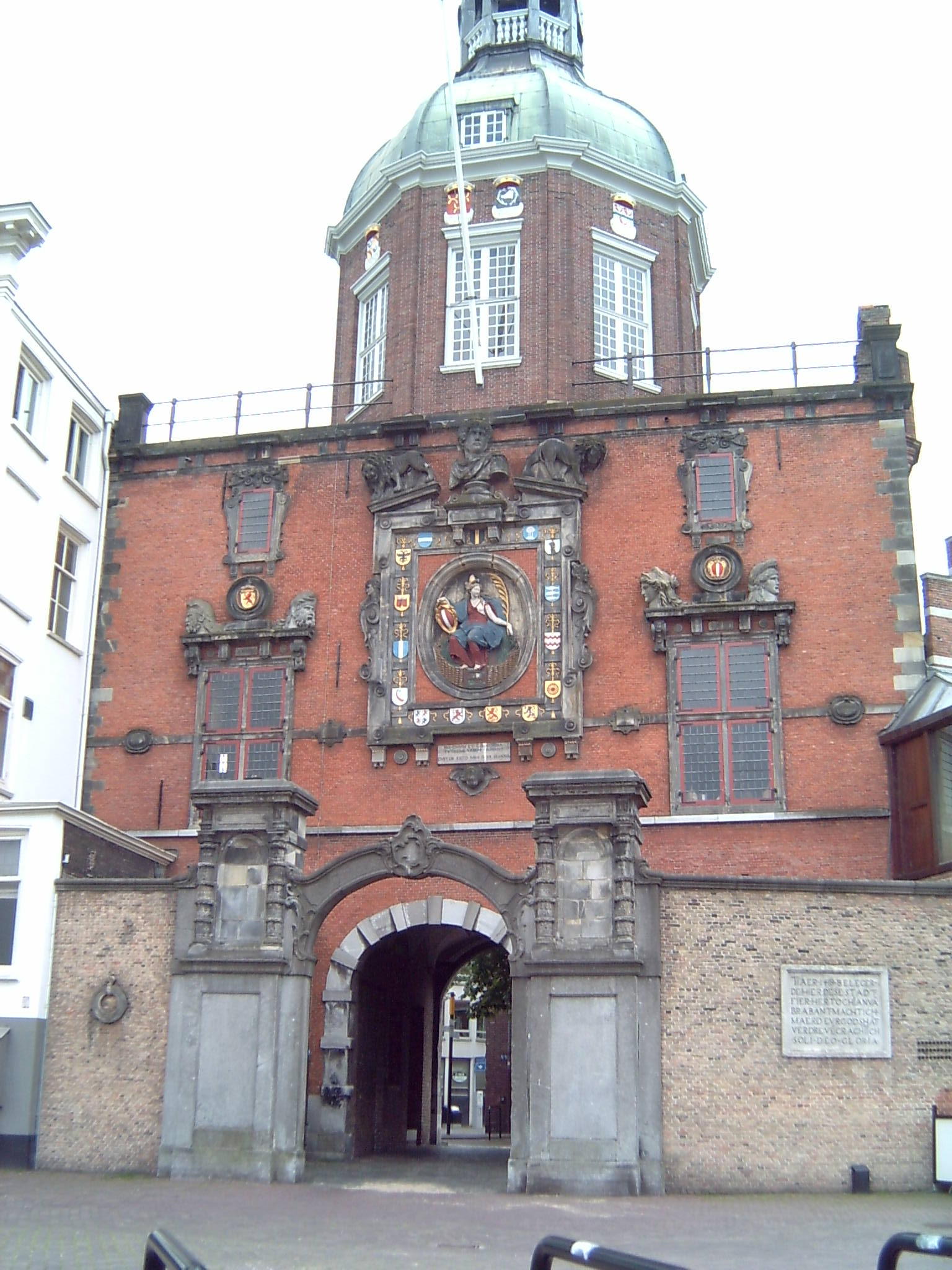
- Groothoofdspoort, with Dordrecht's maiden relief
- Interactive map of the Groothoofdspoort area

General information
- Type: City Gate
- Architectural style: Renaissance
- Location: Dordrecht, Boomstraat 39, 3300AA Dordrecht
- Coordinates: 51°49′10″N 4°40′13″E
- Completed: 15th century (facades 1618, tower 1692)
- Renovated: 1975

The Groothoofdspoort is a former city gate in Dordrecht that is located at the point where three rivers meet; the Merwede, the Oude Maas, and the Noord.

== History ==
The building was designed in the 14th century and was originally built with gothic details. The facades were built in 1618 and the tower was added in 1692. The relief above the doorway facing the river was designed by Gillis Huppe in 1618 and shows the Dordrecht maiden sitting in the "Garden of Holland", holding a palm branch in her left hand and the city shield in her right hand, based on an earlier design by the Dordrecht painter Gerrit Gerritsz Cuyp. She is surrounded by 16 city shields of cities who rebelled during the eighty years war. From top right, these city shields are the cities of Monnickendam (monk), Enkhuizen (3 fish), Asperen, Heusden, Schiedam, Vlaardingen, Geertruidenberg, Schoonhoven, Hoorn, Weesp, Leerdam, Naarden, Muiden, Medemblik, and Grootebroek. Under the shields, a Latin inscription states "Unity and peace are the best defence for a city; May my God Jehovah protect me". On the other side of the tower is a relief with the shield of Dordrecht held by two griffins.

The roof was replaced by a tower in 1692 and contains a bell by H.Meurs.

The current occupant "Bellevue Groothoofd hotel culinair", a hotel restaurant in the "Groothoofd" block of buildings including the gate, and where Dordrecht residents can arrange to be wed in the old gate building, claims that the "Hotel Belle Vue" building next to the gate was first mentioned in city documents in 1817.

== Gallery ==
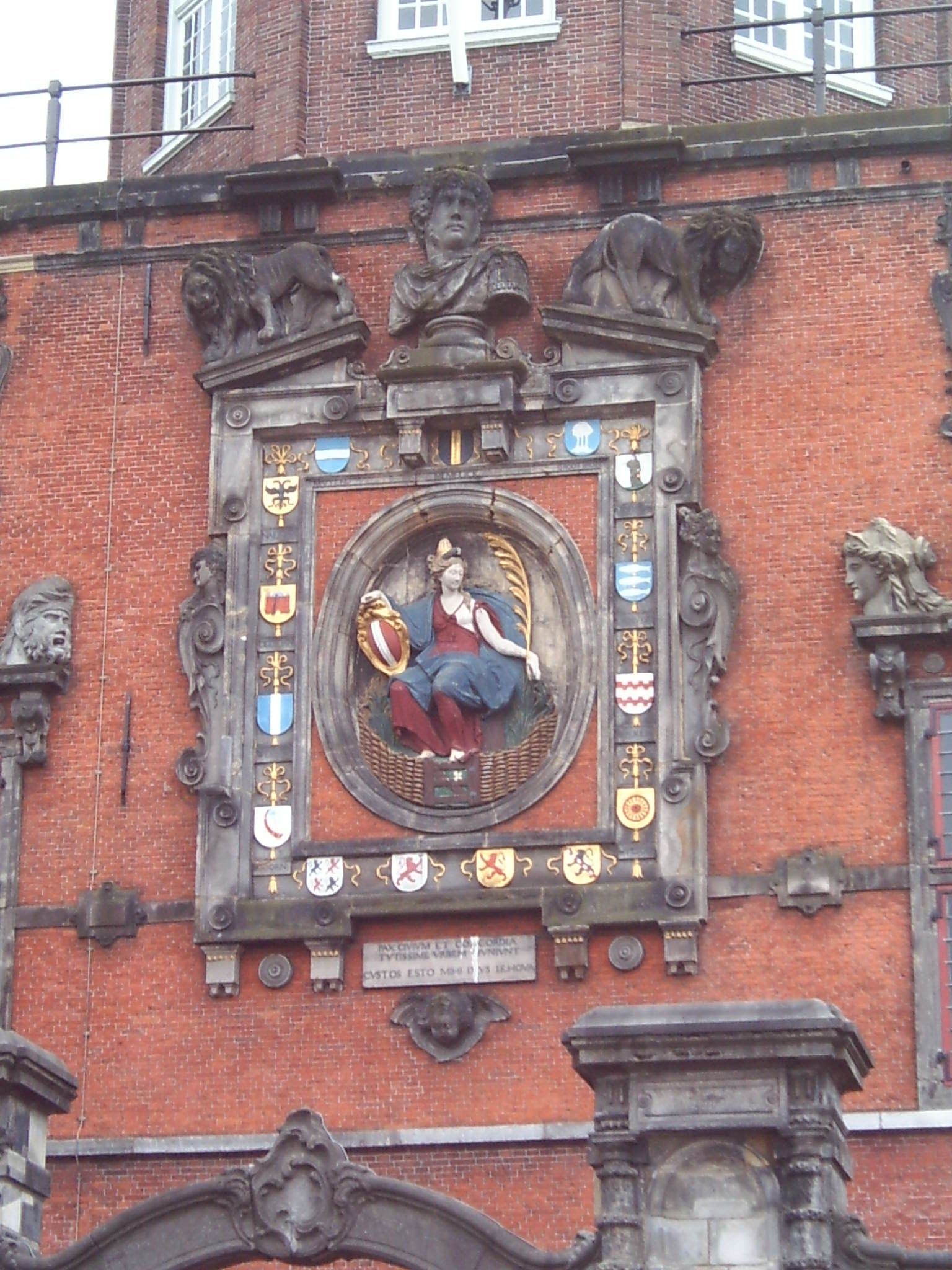
Detail with relief of Dordrecht maiden surrounded by city shields, sculpted by Gillis Huppe

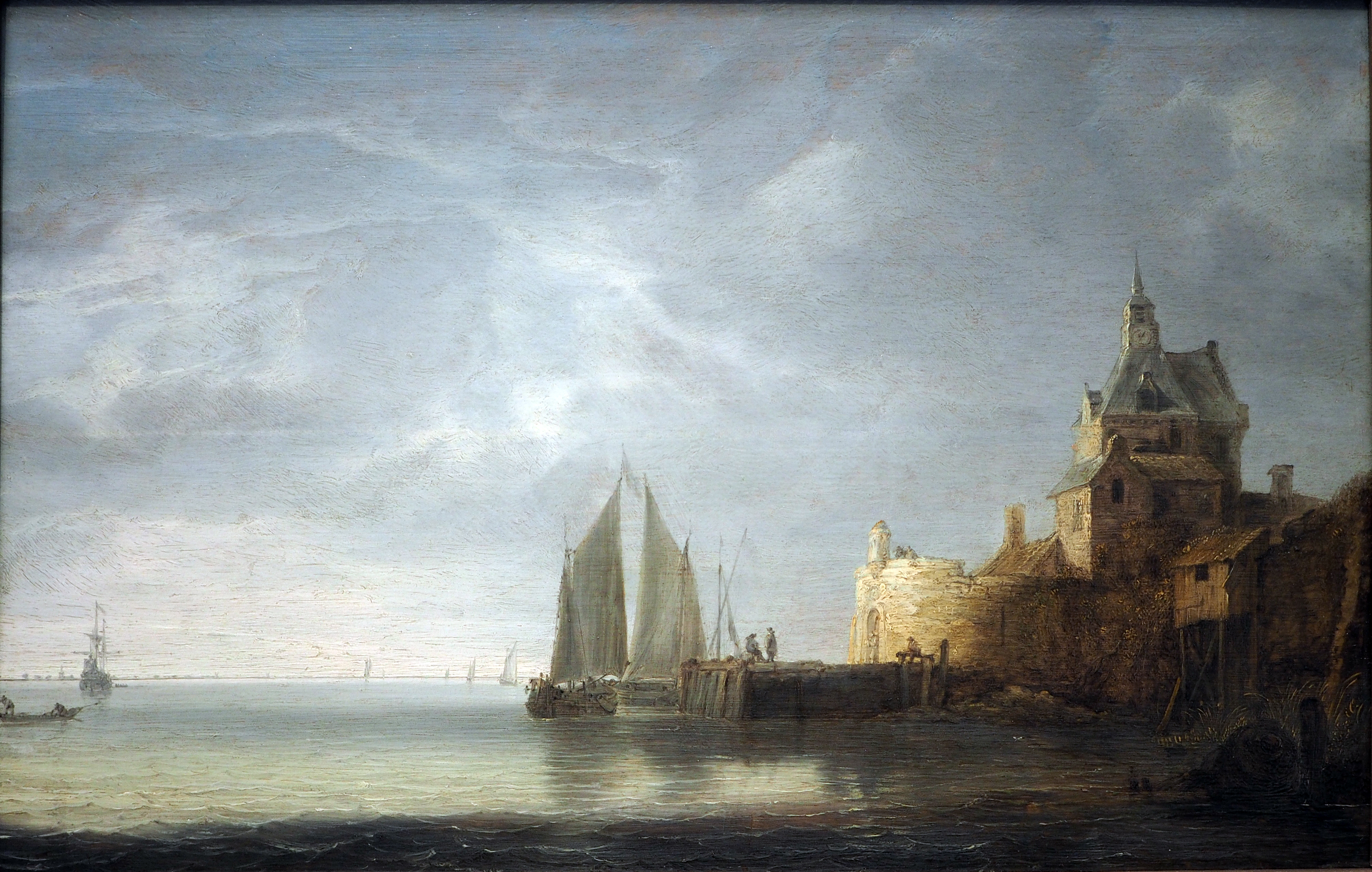
1648

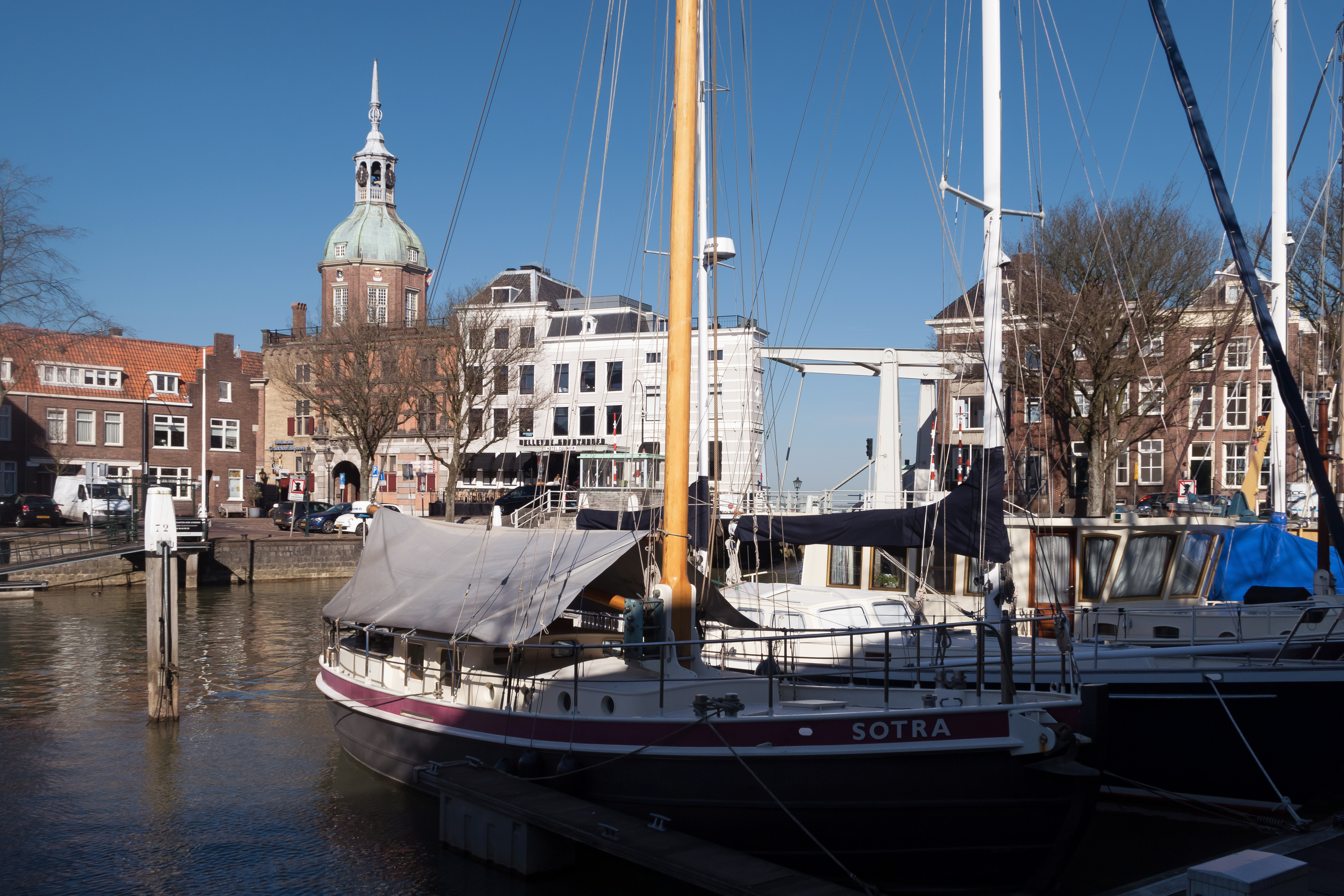
Dordrecht, towngate (de Groothoofdspoort) from the Taankade
