= Peursum =

Former Dutch village and municipality (1817–1956)

Coordinates: 51°51′N 4°55′E

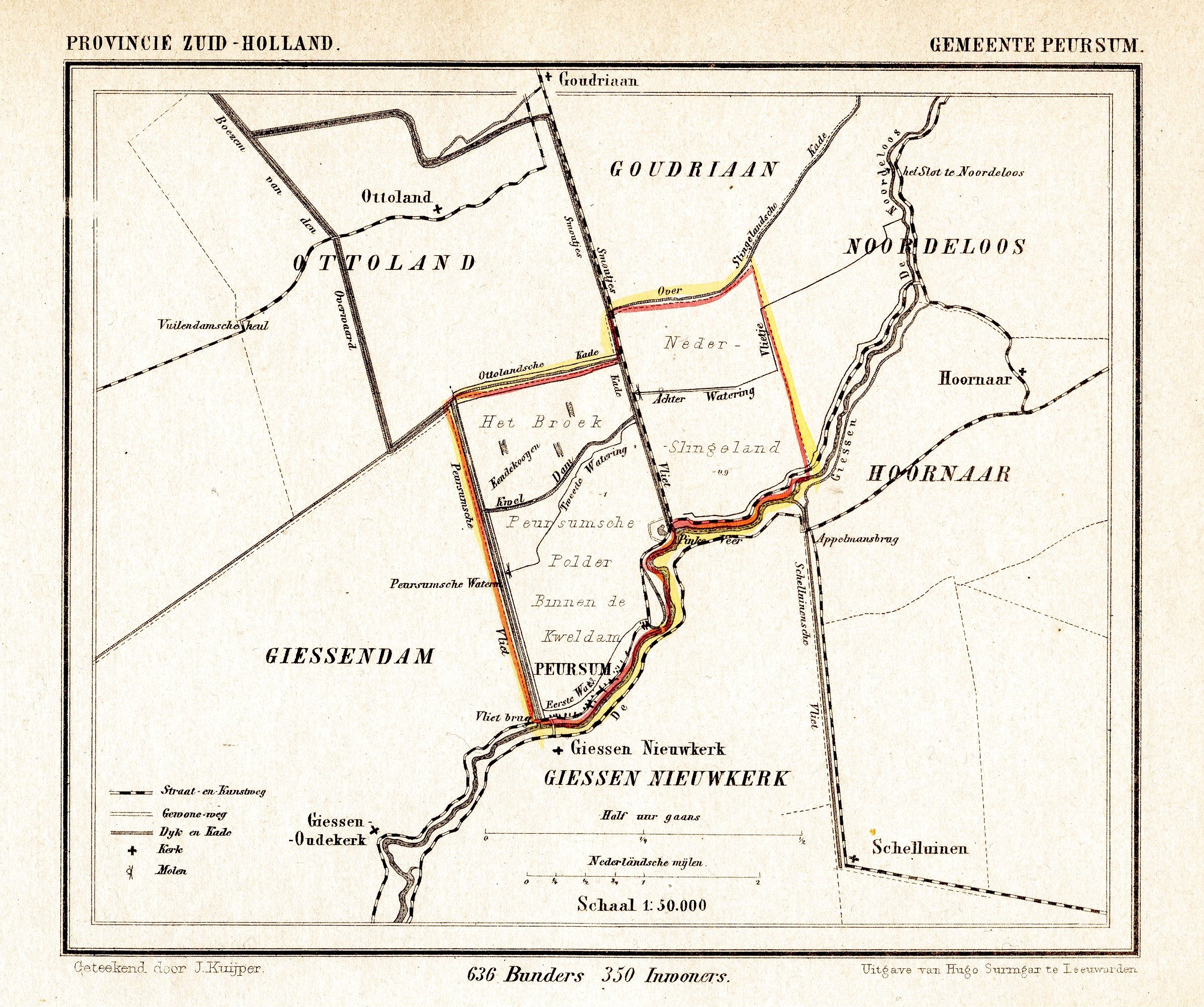
The former municipality of Peursum in 1867.

Peursum is a former village and municipality in the Dutch province of South Holland, located on the north bank of the river Giessen. It was a separate municipality between 1817 and 1956, when it became part of Giessenburg. In 1857, Peursum was enlarged with the former municipality of Nederslingeland.
