= Nederslingeland =

Coordinates: 51°52′N 4°55′E

Nederslingeland is a polder in the Dutch province of South Holland. It is located about 5 km northwest of the city of Gorinchem. The hamlet Pinkeveer is located in the polder.

Nederslingeland was a separate municipality between 1817 and 1857, when it became part of Peursum.
