= Pieter Cornelisz van Slingelandt =

Dutch Golden Age painter (1640–1691)

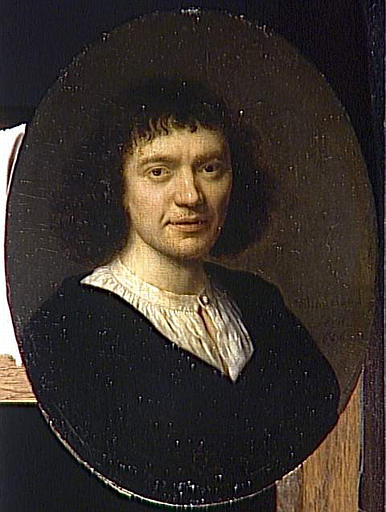
- 'Self-portrait in oval frame.
- Born: Pieter Cornelisz; 1640; Leiden
- Died: 1691 (aged 50–51); Leiden
- Known for: Painting
- Movement: Fijnschilder

Pieter Cornelisz van Slingelandt (20 October 1640 – 7 November 1691) was a Dutch Golden Age portrait painter who had been a pupil of Gerard Dou and is known as one of Leiden's fijnschilders.

== Biography ==
According to Houbraken, his teacher was Gerard Dou, whom he imitated so well that many of his works were later misattributed to him. He was rather introverted and very methodical and conscientious, spending months on his works and striving for perfection. Houbraken especially liked a piece where a maid holds a mouse by the tail as a cat jumps for it.

Houbraken wrote that Slingelandt took 3 years to paint a family portrait for the gentleman Mr. Meerman, and that he took 6 weeks to paint the lace of one child's bib. That painting currently hangs in the Louvre.

According to the RKD he became a member of the Leiden Guild of St. Luke on November 22, 1661. He remained a member until 1668, and after a break of five years began paying dues again from 1673 to 1680. In 1690 he became headman, and in 1691 deacon of the guild. Though he appears in the catalogue raisonné of C. Hofstede de Groot, the only painting mentioned there is one that is no longer attributed to Slingelandt. His pupils were Jacob van der Sluys, and Jan Tilius. Adriaen van Gaesbeeck, who was also sometimes mentioned as a pupil of Slingelandt, was in reality 19 years older and died when Slingelandt was only 9 years old.

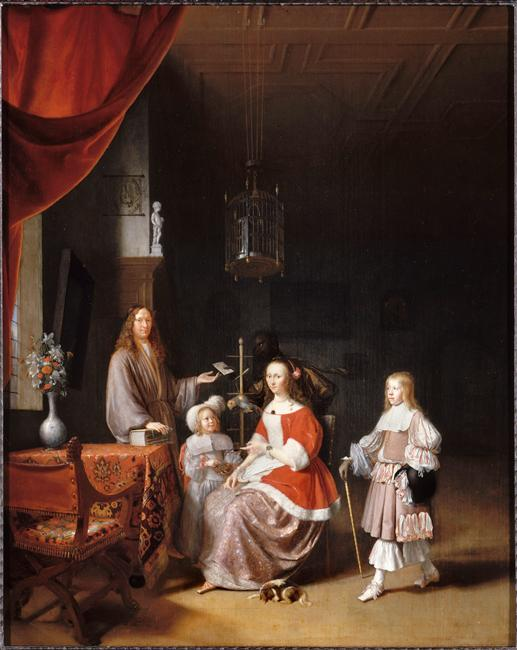
Portrait of the Meerman Family

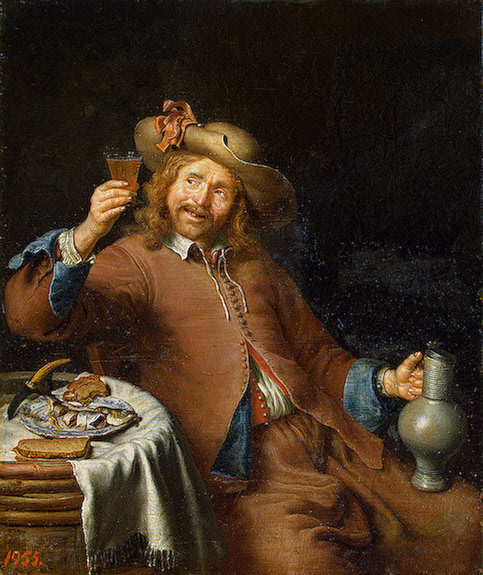
Breakfast of a Young Man (second half of 17th century), Hermitage Museum

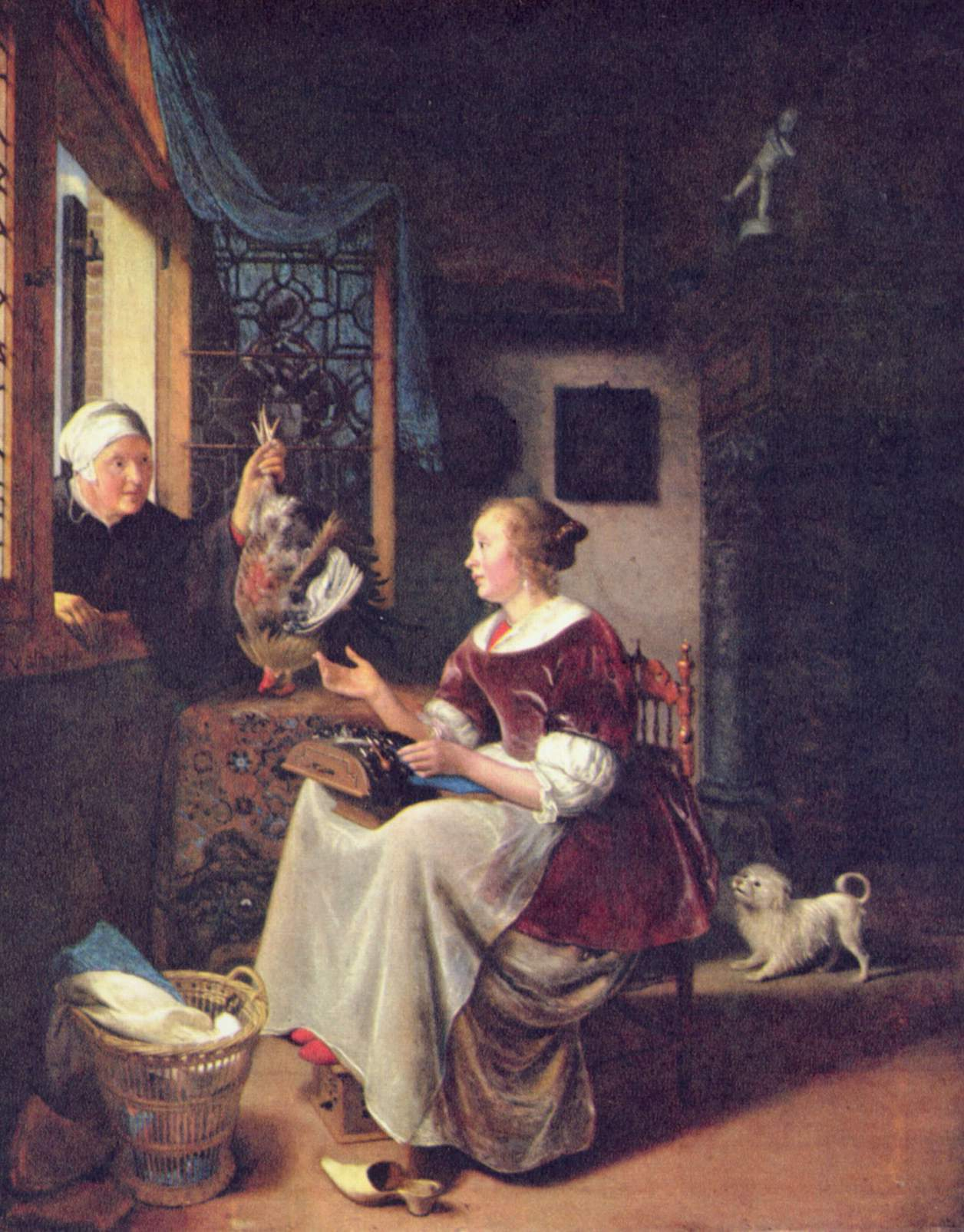
A young lacemaker is interrupted by a birdseller who offers her ware through the window, 1672–3.
