= Asperen =

- Small city
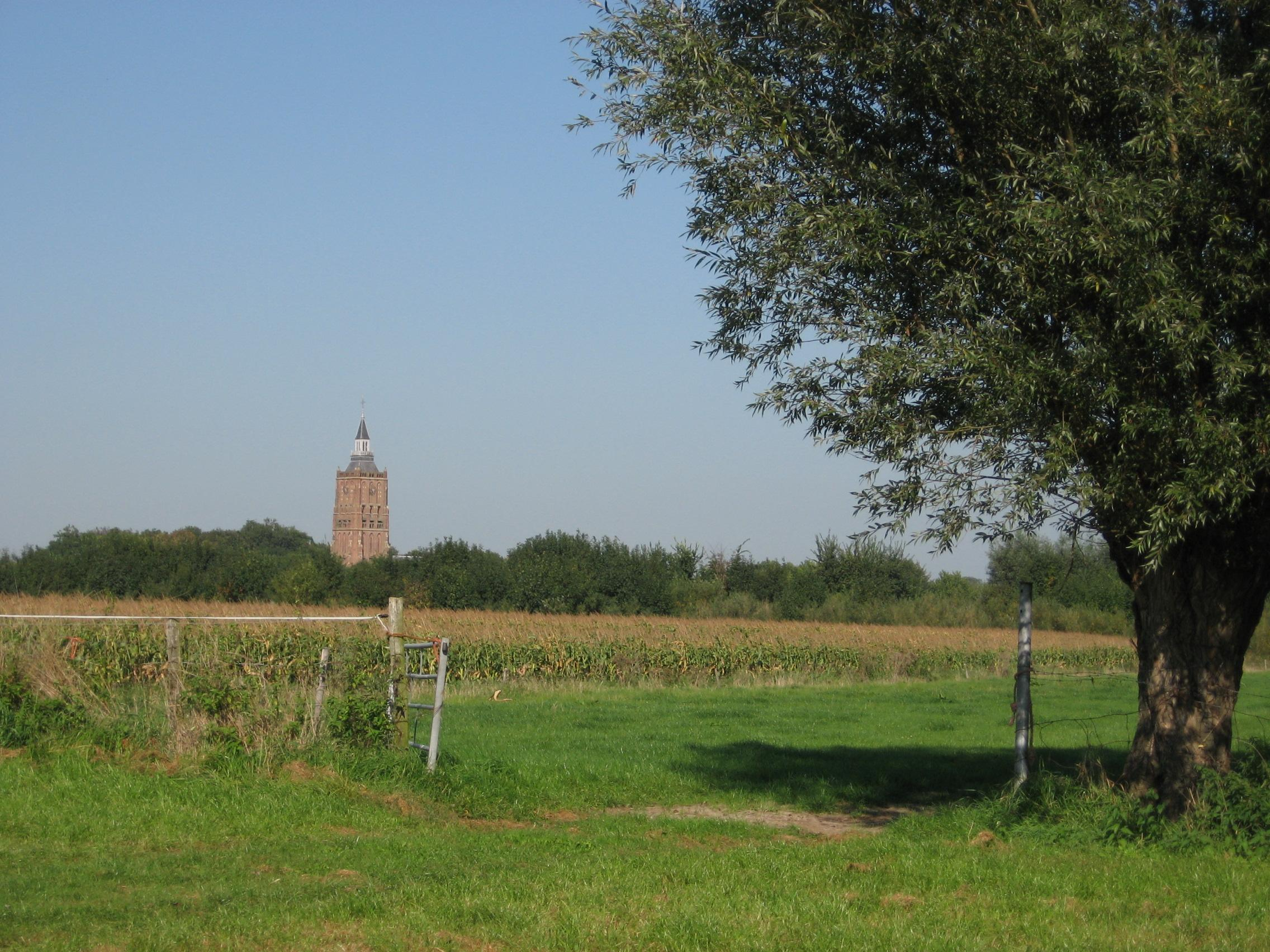
- Tower of the Protestant church in Asperen

- Flag Coat of arms

- Location of Gelderland in the Netherlands Asperen (Netherlands)
- Coordinates: 51°52′53″N 5°6′24″E
- Country: Netherlands
- Province: Gelderland
- Municipality: West Betuwe

Area
  - Total: 3.32 km^{2} (1.28 sq mi)
- Elevation: 3.7 m (12 ft)

Population (2021)
  - Total: 3,205
  - Density: 965/km^{2} (2,500/sq mi)
- Time zone: UTC+1 (CET)
  - Summer (DST): UTC+2 (CEST)
- Postal code: 4147
- Dialing code: 0345

Asperen is a small city in the Dutch province of Gelderland. It is a part of the municipality of West Betuwe, and lies about 10 km (6 miles) east of Gorinchem on the river Linge. It received city rights in 1313.

== History ==
In Roman times Asperen was the location of the Roman settlement Caspingium. The name Asperen was first used in 893. The etymology is unknown. Asperen was an esdorp which developed in the Early Middle Ages along the Linge River. It received city rights in 1313, and city walls and a circular canal around the city were constructed, however the city never developed. Part of the city wall and the Waterpoort, a city gate, have remained. Asperen Castle was destroyed by the French in 1672.

The Dutch Reformed church was built in the 15th century. It was damaged by a city fire in 1896, and restored between 1896 and 1901. There are quite a number of farms within the city centre. Fort Asperen is located outside of the city. It was built in 1845 as part of the Dutch Water Line, and is nowadays is use for exhibitions and cultural activities.

Asperen was home to 1,147 people in 1840. Until 1986, Asperen was a separate municipality; until that year, it was located in the province of South Holland. It is nowadays part of the province of Gelderland.

== Notable people ==
Dirk Willems was a notable resident, as a sixteenth-century martyred Anabaptist – most famous for his act, after escaping from prison, of turning around to rescue his pursuer, who had fallen through thin ice while chasing Willems. This resulted in Willems being recaptured, then tortured and killed for his faith.

A number of family surnames and variations originate from this place name, such as Van Asperen, Asperenn, Asperenns, Asperens, Asperene, Asperenes, Asper, Asperren, Aspperen and Aspperens.

== Gallery ==
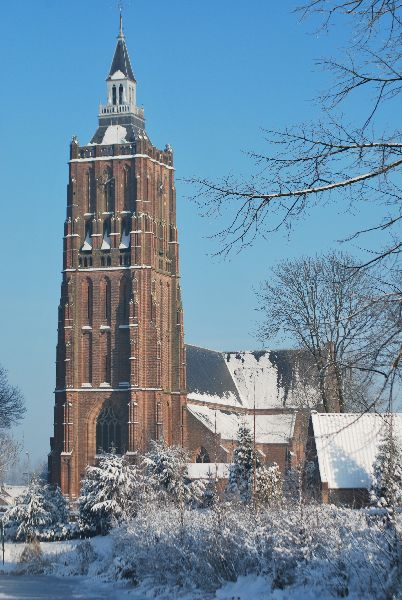
Tower of the Protestant church in Asperen in the winter of 2010

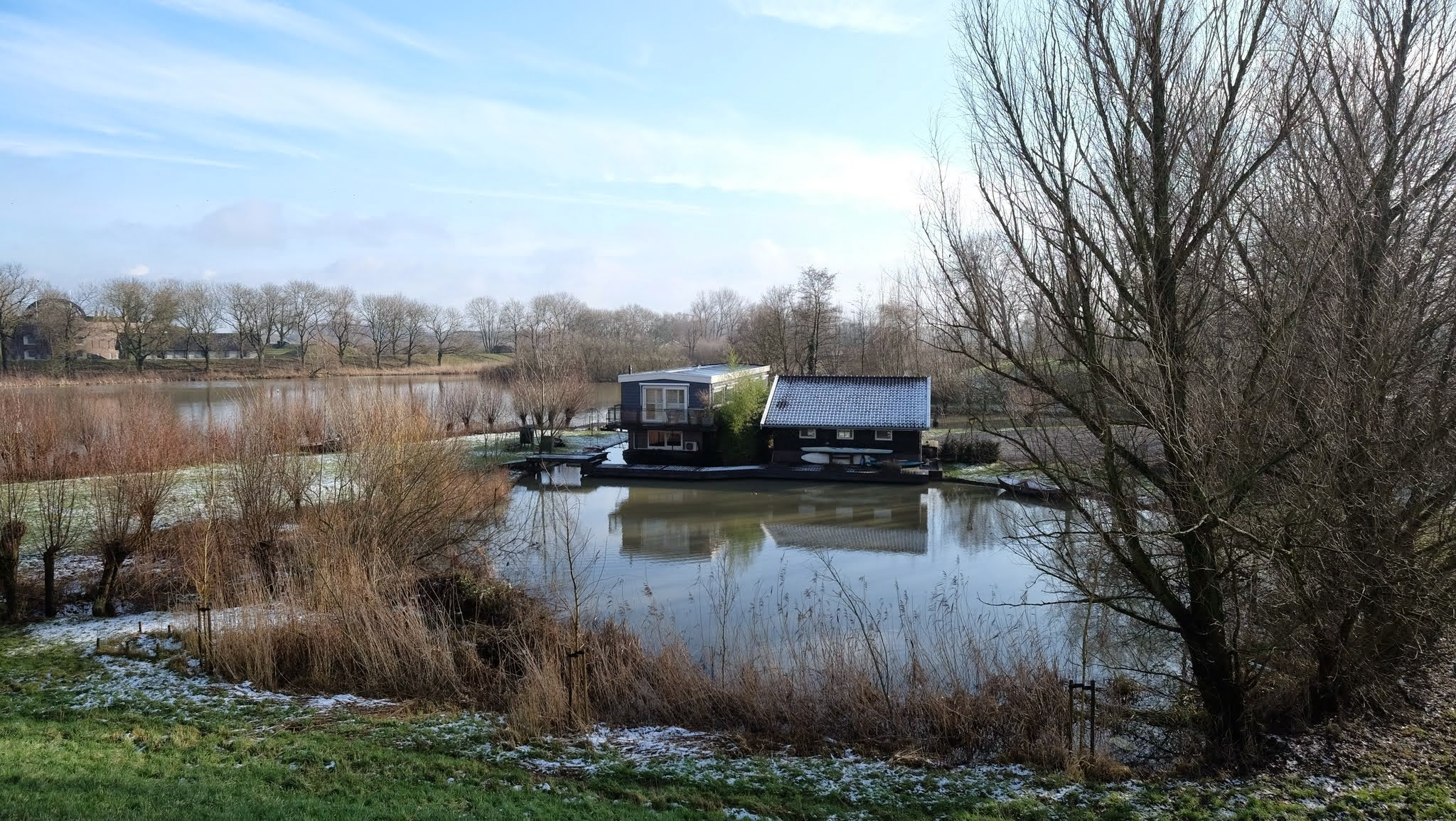
Farm in Asperen

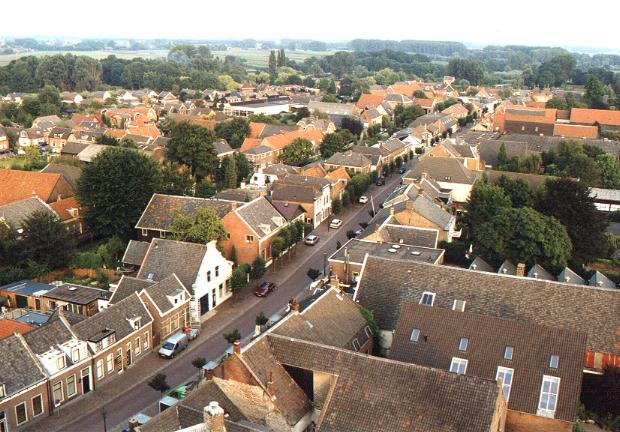
Aerial view

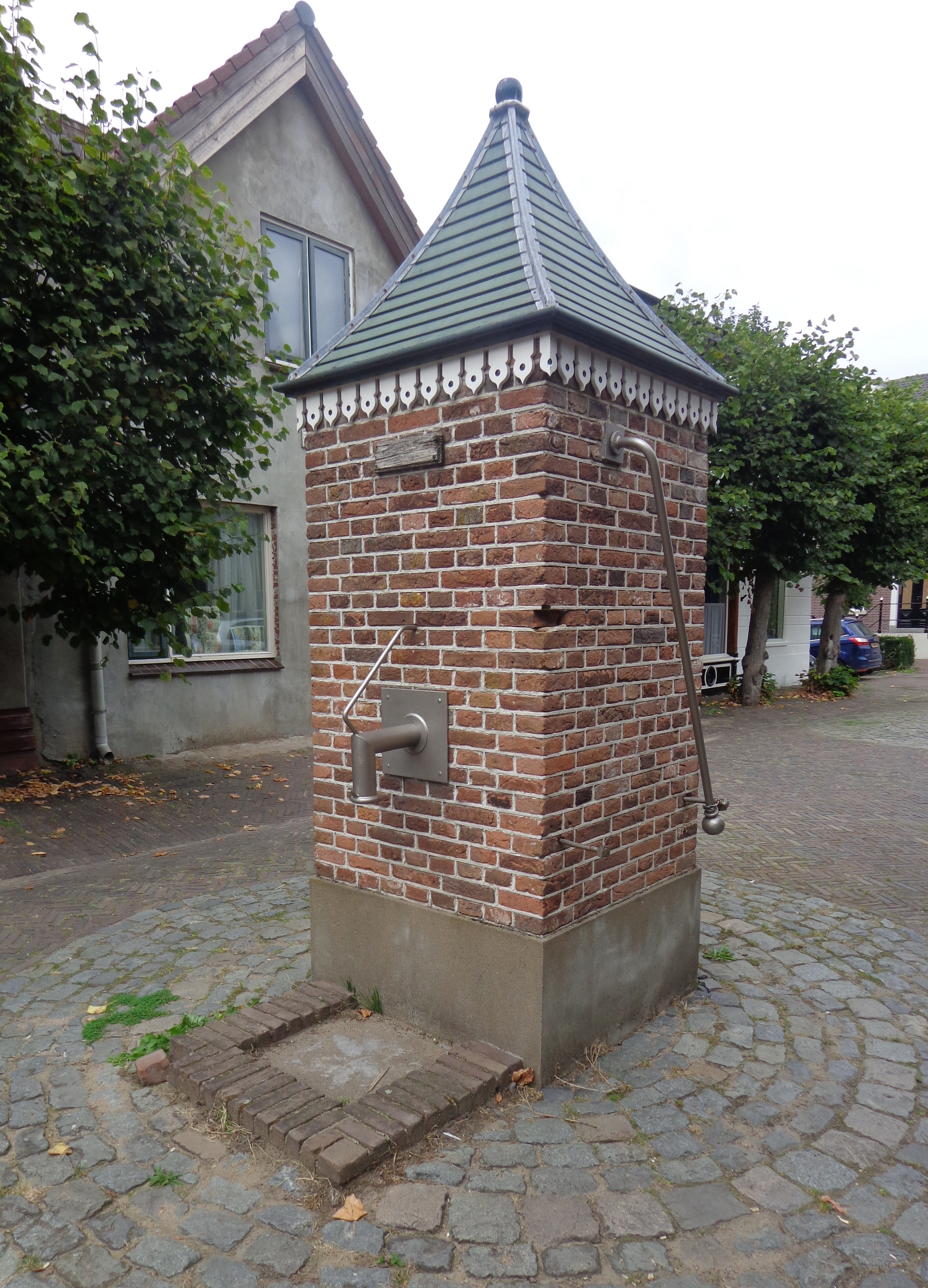
Village pump
