= Mignon Desires her Fatherland =

Painting by Ary Scheffer

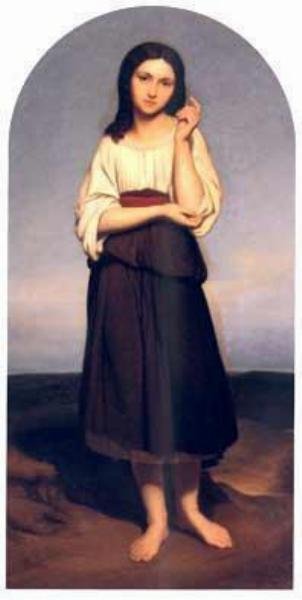
- Artist: Ary Scheffer
- Year: 1836
- Medium: Oil on canvas
- Dimensions: 171 cm × 87 cm (67 in × 34 in)
- Location: Dordrechts Museum; Dordrecht

Mignon Desires her Fatherland (Dutch: Mignon verlangende naar haar vaderland) is an oil on canvas painting by the Dutch-French artist Ary Scheffer, from 1836. The picture depicts a young woman, Mignon, inspired from a character in Goethe's 1795-96 novel Wilhelm Meister's Apprenticeship. The 1866 Ambroise Thomas opera Mignon was based on the same character, and Scheffer's feminine representation of Mignon in a dress influenced her portrayal by Thomas. The painting currently hangs in the Dordrechts Museum in Dordrecht, Netherlands.

== Related paintings ==
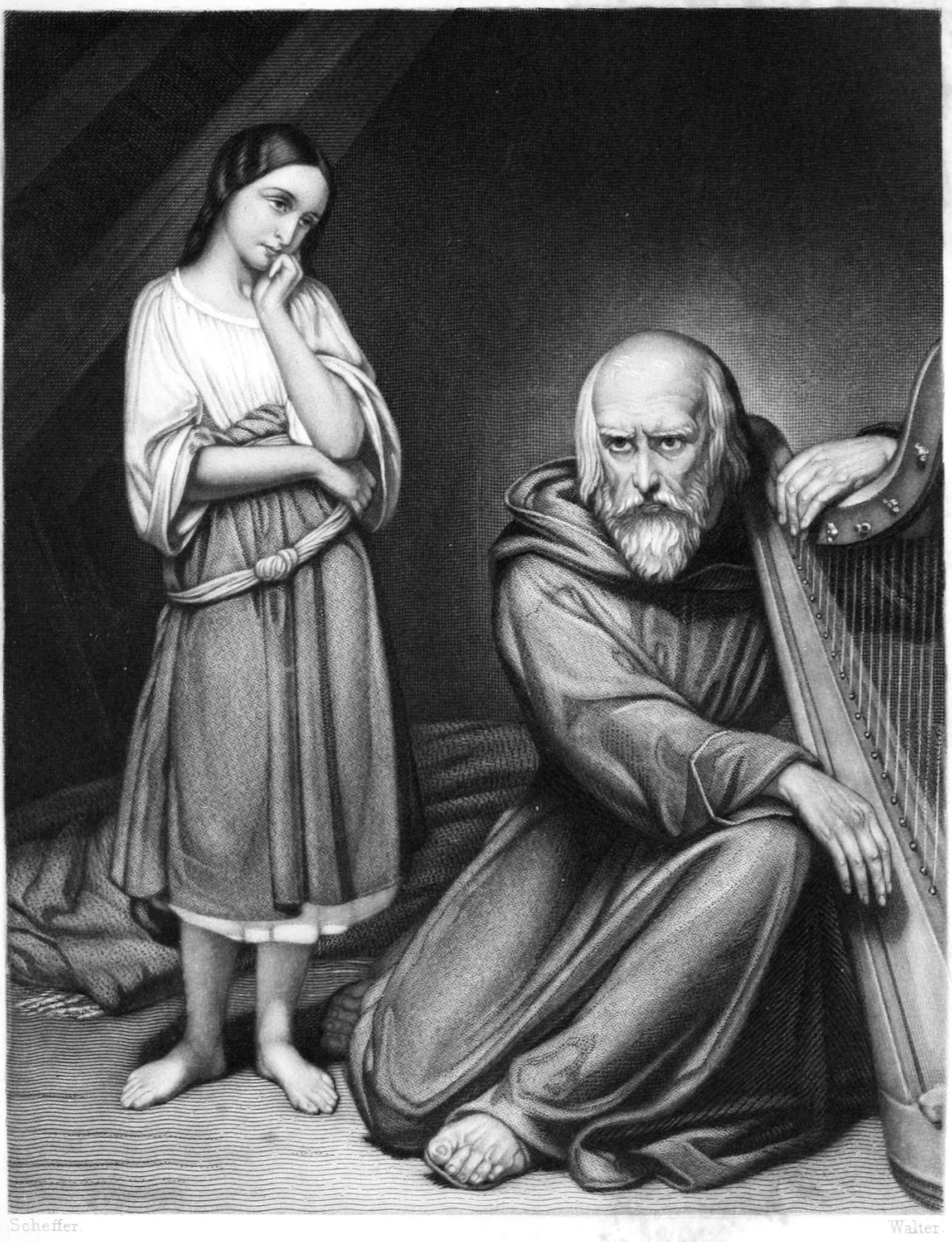
"The Harper and the Maiden", engraved by Walter from a painting by Scheffer (1851)

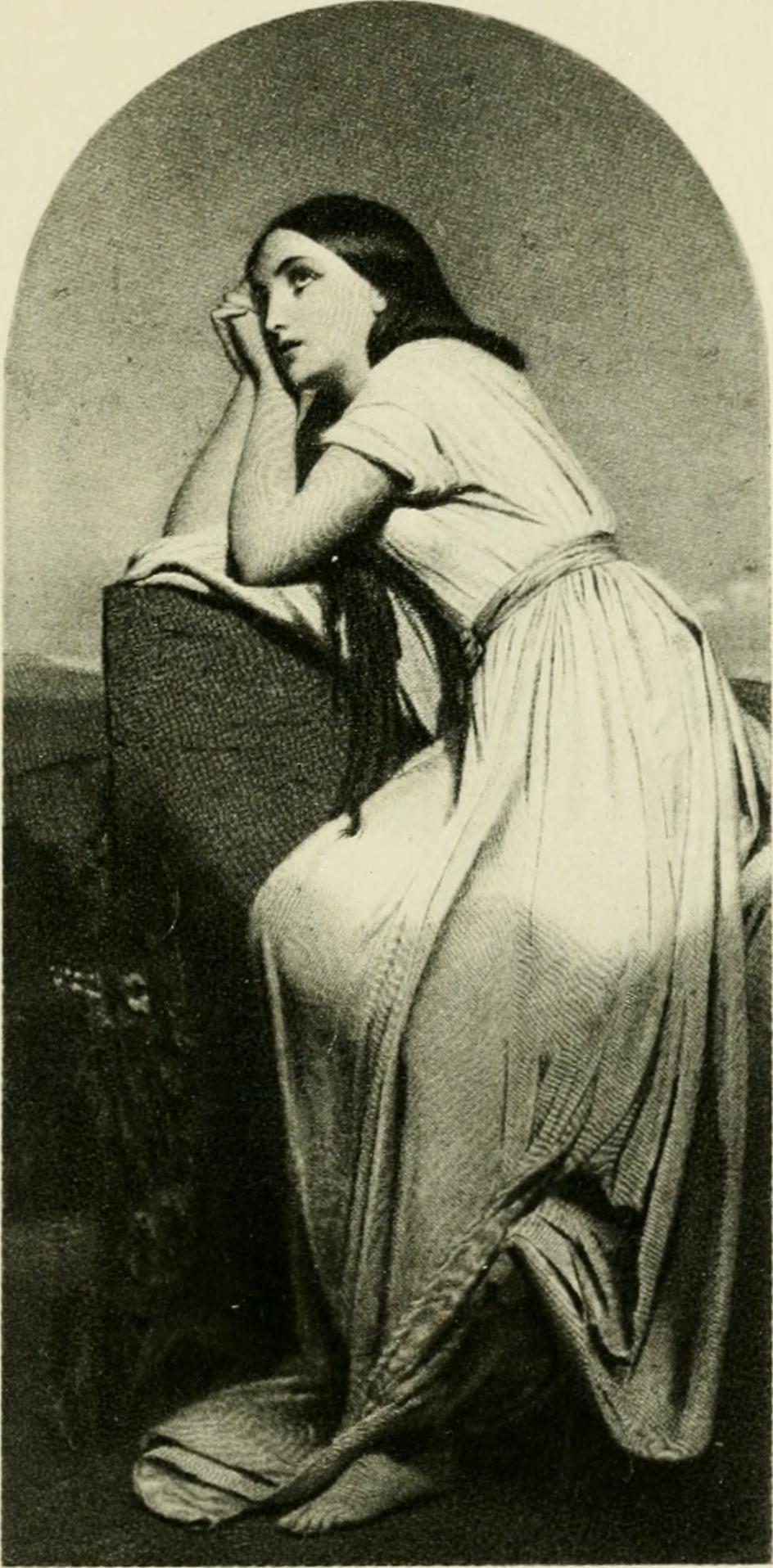
"Mignon yearns for heaven" (1851/1915) by Scheffer

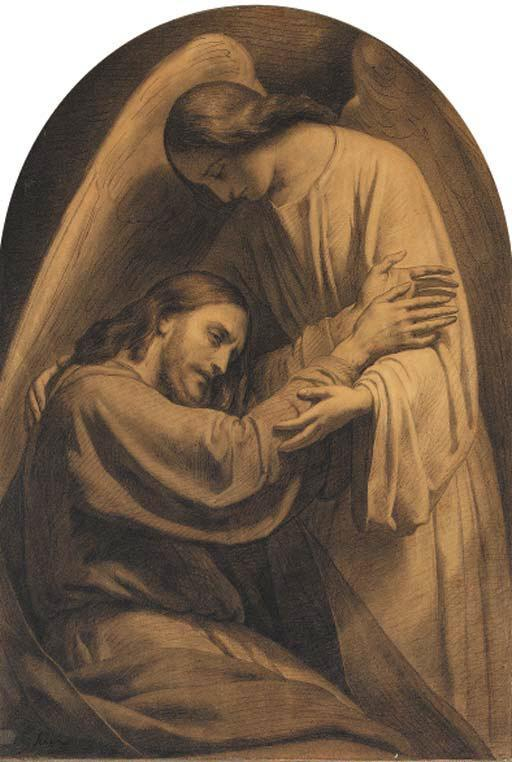
Unknown name artwork by Scheffer. Between 1848 and 1858.

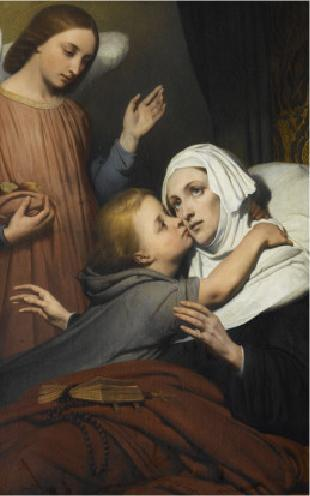
Unknown name artwork by Scheffer, circa 1852–1858.
