= Saint Thomas Preaching During a Storm =

Painting by Ary Scheffer

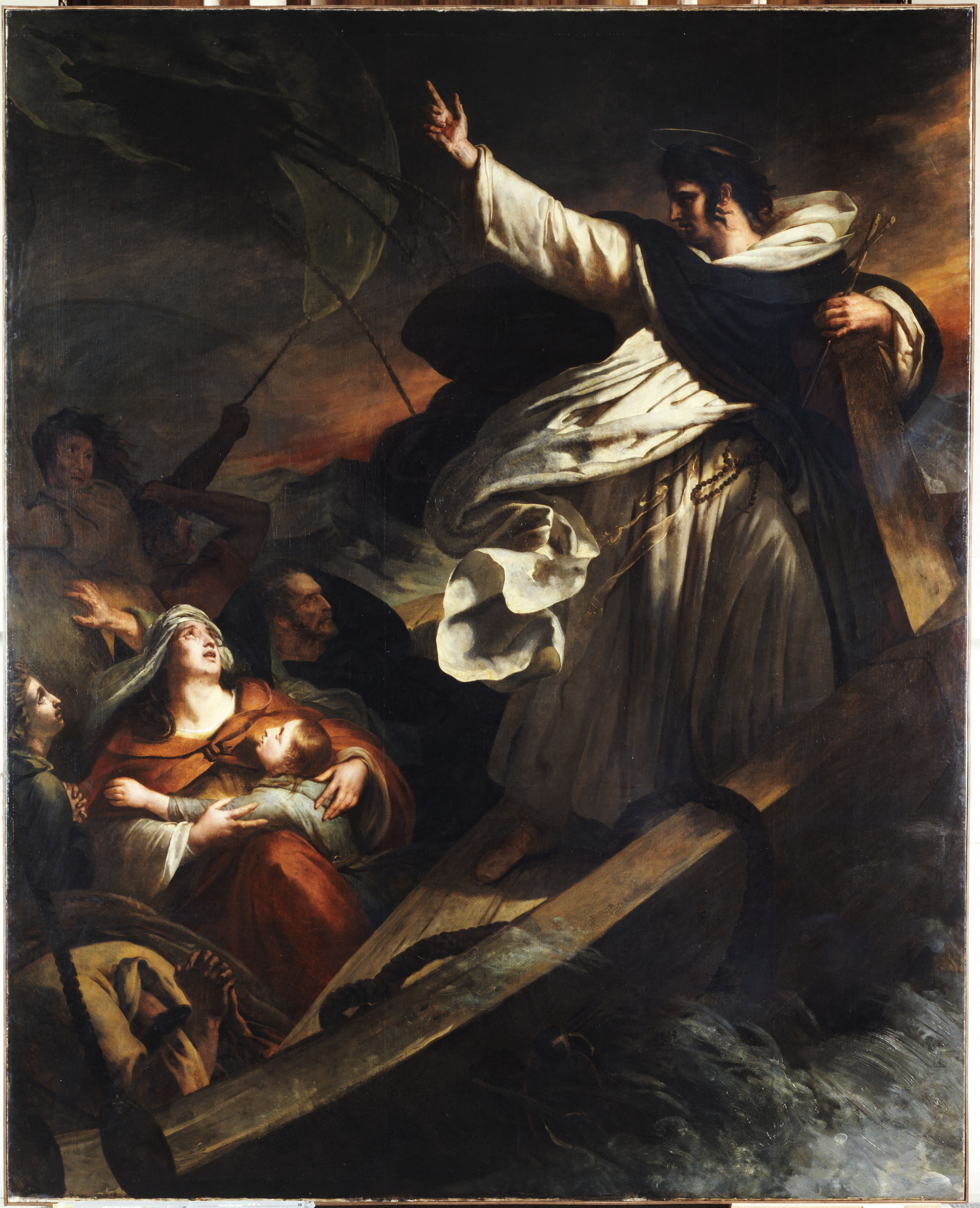
- Artist: Ary Scheffer
- Year: 1823
- Type: Oil on canvas, history painting
- Dimensions: 353 cm × 295 cm (139 in × 116 in)
- Location: Petit Palais, Paris

Saint Thomas Preaching During a Storm (French: Saint Thomas d'Aquin prêchant la confiance en Dieu pendant la tempête) is an oil on canvas religious history painting by the Dutch-French artist Ary Scheffer, from 1823. It is held at the Petit Palais, in Paris.

== History and description ==
It features a scene from the life of Thomas Aquinas. When travelling to Paris his vessel was caught in a violent storm and the saint calmed the terrified sailors by imploring them to put their faith in God. The saint is seen pointing to Heaven while he is looked upon by some of the crew members, including a mother with a child. The painting was commissioned by the French government to commemorate the 500th anniversary of Aquinas's canonisation.

Scheffer settled in France and became a prominent member of the Romantic movement. Stylistically the picture has similarities to his fellow Romantic Eugène Delacroix's The Barque of Dante, produced the previous year. Today the painting is part of the collection of the Musée des Beaux-Arts de la ville de Paris at the Petit Palais.

An engraving by Achille Réveil based on the painting was exhibited at the Salon of 1824 at the Louvre.

== Bibliography ==
- Boime, Albert. A Social History of Modern Art, Volume 3: Art in Age of Counterrevolution. University of Chicago Press, 2004.
- Elkins, James. On the Strange Place of Religion in Contemporary Art. Routledge, 2004.
