= Portrait of Lafayette (Scheffer) =

Painting by Ary Scheffer

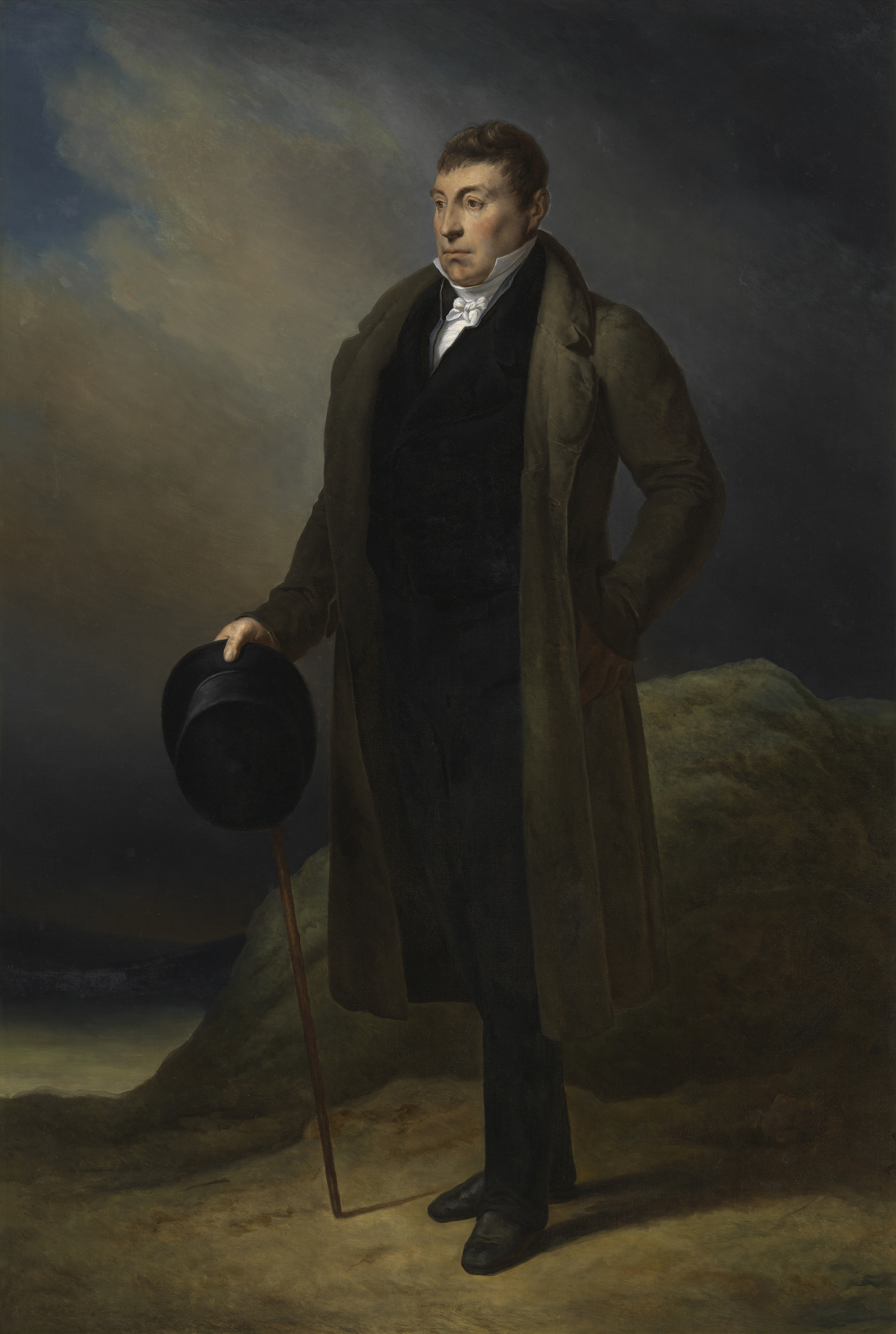
- Artist: Ary Scheffer
- Year: 1823
- Type: Oil on canvas, portrait painting
- Dimensions: 233.7 cm × 157.5 cm (92.0 in × 62.0 in)
- Location: Capitol, Washington D.C.

Portrait of Lafayette is an oil on canvas portrait painting by the Dutch artist Ary Scheffer, from 1823. It depicts the French statesman Marquis de Lafayette at full-length.

== History and description ==
The original portrait was painted by Ary Scheffer in 1819. Scheffer, a political liberal, had moved to France in 1811 and became associated with the romantic movement. He was a longtime friend of Lafayette. The portrait was exhibited at the Salon of 1819 at the Louvre in Paris. The marquis considered this portrait, of all the many likeness made of him, to resemble him most closely.

In 1822–23 Scheffer prepared two copies, one for the marquis, and a second to accompany the marquis on his Farewell Tour back to America in 1824-25. Scheffer retained the 1819 original.

In 1824, the work was offered as a gift to commemorate Lafayette's visit to the United States, in which he addressed a joint session of Congress, the first foreign dignitary to do so.

It was displayed at the Capitol Rotunda during Lafayette's visit as the Nations' Guest and enjoyed great public popularity. In 1825 the congressional copy of the portrait was hung in the House of Representatives. The image, in full or truncated formate, has often been imitated by artists in America and abroad. The replication of the image in these various forms testified to Lafayette's popularity.

Today the painting hangs in the chamber of the House of Representatives.

The original was auctioned by Christie's in 2001.

== Bibliography ==
- Quick, Michael, Sadik, Marvin S. & Gerdts, William H. American Portraiture in the Grand Manner, 1720-1920. Los Angeles County Museum of Art, 1891
