= Ary Scheffer =

Dutch-French painter (1795–1858)

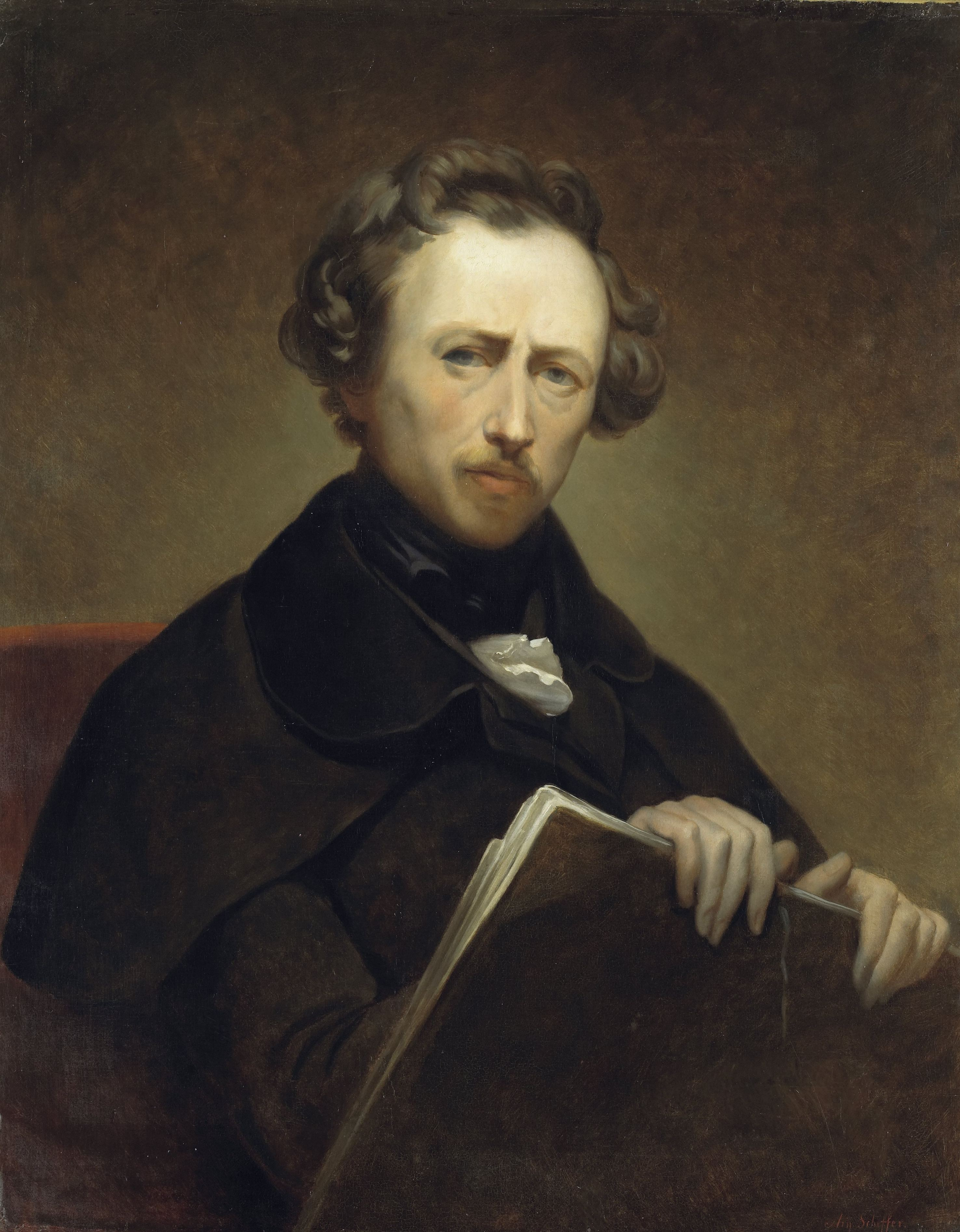
- Self Portrait at the age of 43, c. 1838
- Born: 10 February 1795; Dordrecht, Netherlands
- Died: 15 June 1858 (aged 63); Argenteuil, France
- Known for: Painting
- Movement: Romanticism

Ary Scheffer (10 February 1795 – 15 June 1858) was a Dutch-French Romantic painter. He was known mostly for his works based on literature, with paintings based on the works of Dante, Goethe, Lord Byron and Walter Scott, as well as religious subjects. He was also a prolific painter of portraits of famous and influential people in his lifetime. Politically, Scheffer had strong ties to King Louis Philippe I, having been employed as a teacher of the latter's children, which allowed him to live a life of luxury for many years until the French Revolution of 1848.

== Early life and education ==
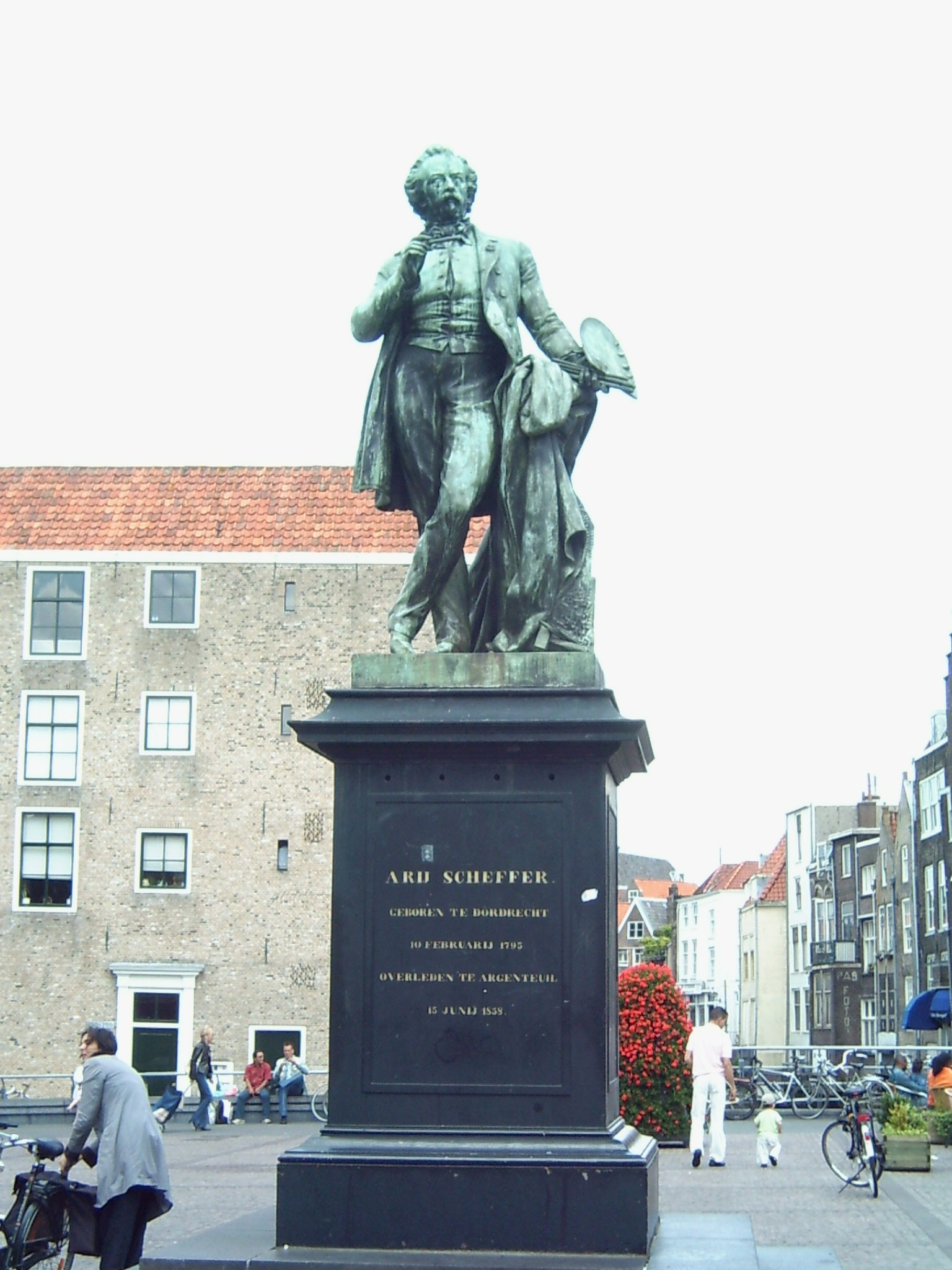
Statue of Scheffer on the Scheffersplein in Dordrecht, made by Joseph Mezzara after a design by Scheffer's daughter, Cornelia

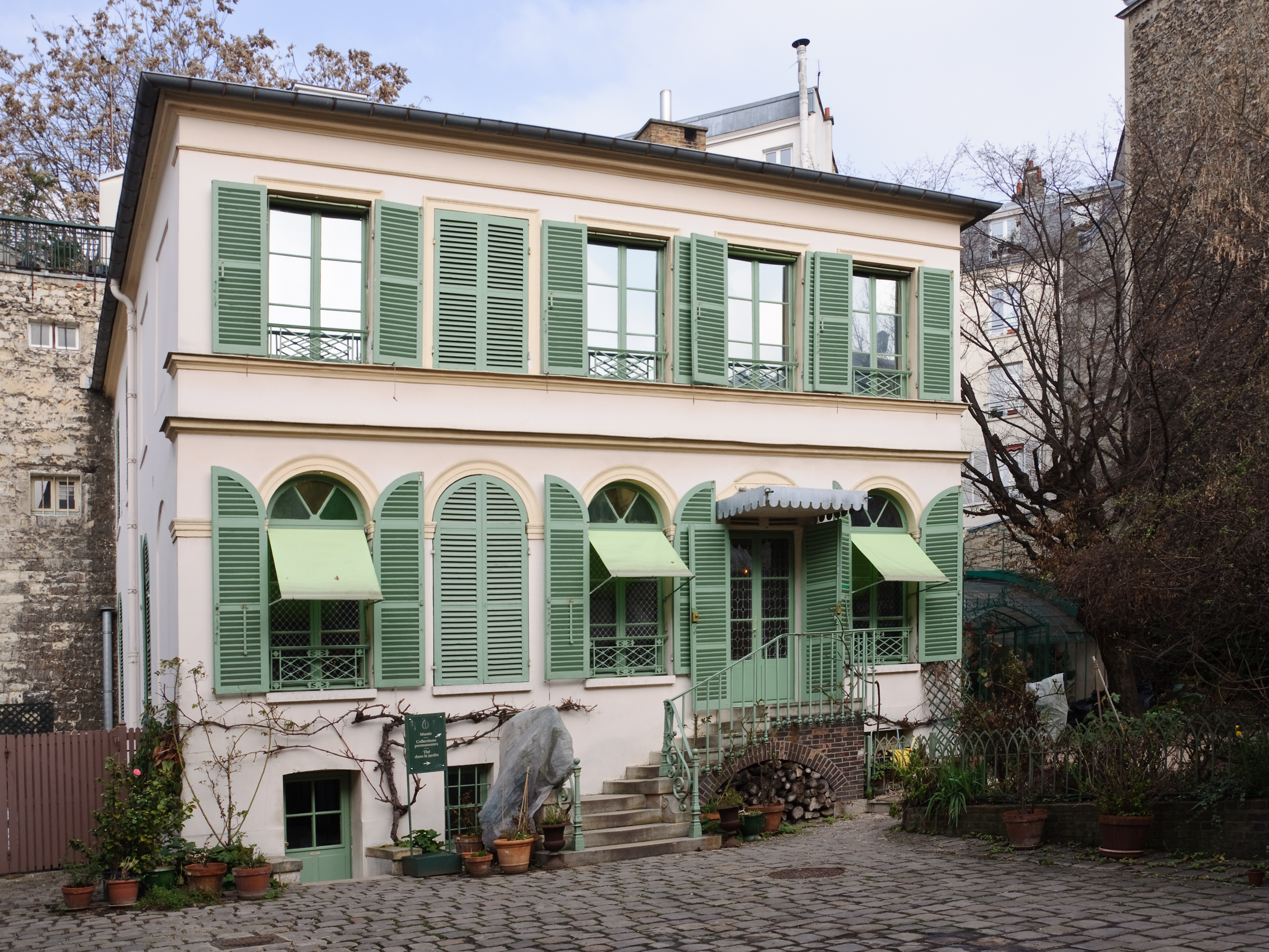
Scheffer's house in Paris, now the Musée de la Vie romantique

Scheffer was the son of Johan Bernard Scheffer (1765–1809), a portrait painter who was born in Homberg upon Ohm or Cassel (both presently in Germany; the latter has been spelled as Kassel since 1926) and moved to the Netherlands in his youth, and Cornelia Lamme (1769–1839), a portrait miniature painter and daughter of landscape painter Arie Lamme of Dordrecht, for whom Arij (later "Ary") was named. Ary Scheffer had two brothers, the journalist and writer Karel Arnold Scheffer (1796–1853) and the painter Hendrik Scheffer (1798–1862). His parents educated him and he attended the drawing academy in Amsterdam from the age of 11 years. In 1808 his father became the court painter of Louis Bonaparte in Amsterdam, yet his father died one year later. Encouraged by Willem Bilderdijk, Ary moved to Lille, France, for further study after the death of his father.

In 1811, he and his mother, who greatly influenced his career, moved to Paris, France, where he studied at the École des Beaux-Arts as a pupil of Pierre-Narcisse Guérin. His brothers later followed them to Paris.

== Career ==
Scheffer started exhibiting at the Salon de Paris in 1812. He began to be recognized in 1817, and in 1819 he was asked to make a portrait of the Marquis de Lafayette. Perhaps because of Lafayette's acquaintances, Scheffer and his brothers were politically active throughout their lives and he became a prominent Philhellene.

In 1822, he became drawing teacher to the children of Duke Louis-Philippe of Orléans. Because of his connection with them, he obtained many commissions for portraiture and other work. In 1830 riots against the rule of King Charles X resulted in his overthrow. On 30 July, Scheffer and influential journalist Adolphe Thiers rode from Paris to Orléans to ask Louis Philippe to lead the resistance, and a few days later he became "King of the French".

That same year, Scheffer's daughter Cornélia was born. Francès Cornélia Scheffer (1830–1899) became a sculptor and painter in her own right. Ary Scheffer registered the name of her mother as "Maria Johanna de Nes", but nothing is known of her and she may have died soon after Cornélia's birth. Considering that his grandmother's name was "Johanna de Nes", it has been speculated that he kept the name of Cornélia's mother secret so as not to compromise the reputation of a noble family. Ary Scheffer's mother did not know of her namesake granddaughter until 1837, after which she cared for Cornélia until she died only two years later.

Ary Scheffer became an associate member of the Royal Institute of the Netherlands in 1846, and resigned in 1851.

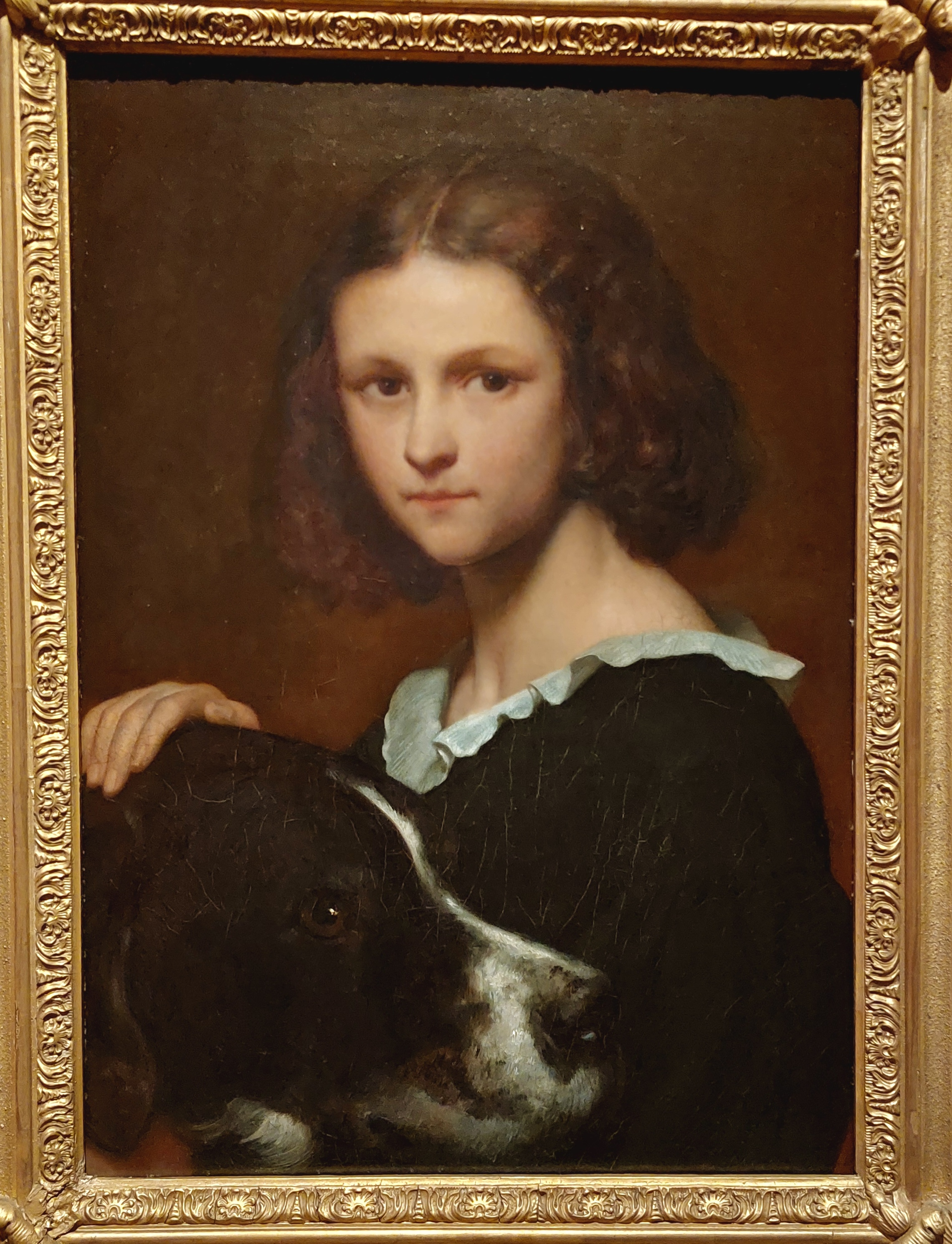
Portrait of his daughter Cornelia together with Turc the dog

Scheffer and his family prospered during the reign of King Louis Philippe, who abdicated on 24 February 1848. Scheffer and Hendrik were inundated with artistic commissions, and they taught numerous students in their workshop in Paris, so many that of the works produced during this period that bear his signature the number that he actually made himself cannot be verified.

Scheffer was elevated as commander of the Legion of Honour in 1848. As a captain of the Garde Nationale, he escorted the French royal family in its escape from the Tuileries Palace and escorted the Duchess d'Orléans to the Chambre des Députés, where she in vain proposed her son as the next monarch of France. Scheffer fought in the army of Cavaignac during the June Days Uprising in Paris of 23 to 26 June 1848. The cruelty and hatred that the governmental faction exhibited and the misery of the lower classes so shocked him that he withdrew from politics and refused to make portraits of the family of Emperor Napoleon III, who reigned after the Uprising.

== Personal life ==
On 16 March 1850, he married Sophie Marin, the widow of General Baudrand, and on 6 November of that year he finally became a French citizen.

== Death ==
He continued to frequently travel to the Netherlands, and traveled to Belgium, Germany, and England, but a heart condition impaired his activity and eventually caused his death in 1858 in his summer house in Argenteuil. He is buried in the Cimetière de Montmartre.

== Works ==
When Scheffer left Guérin's studio, Romanticism had come into vogue in France, with such painters as Xavier Sigalon, Eugène Delacroix and Théodore Géricault. Scheffer did not show much affinity with their work and developed his own style, which has been called "frigidly classical".

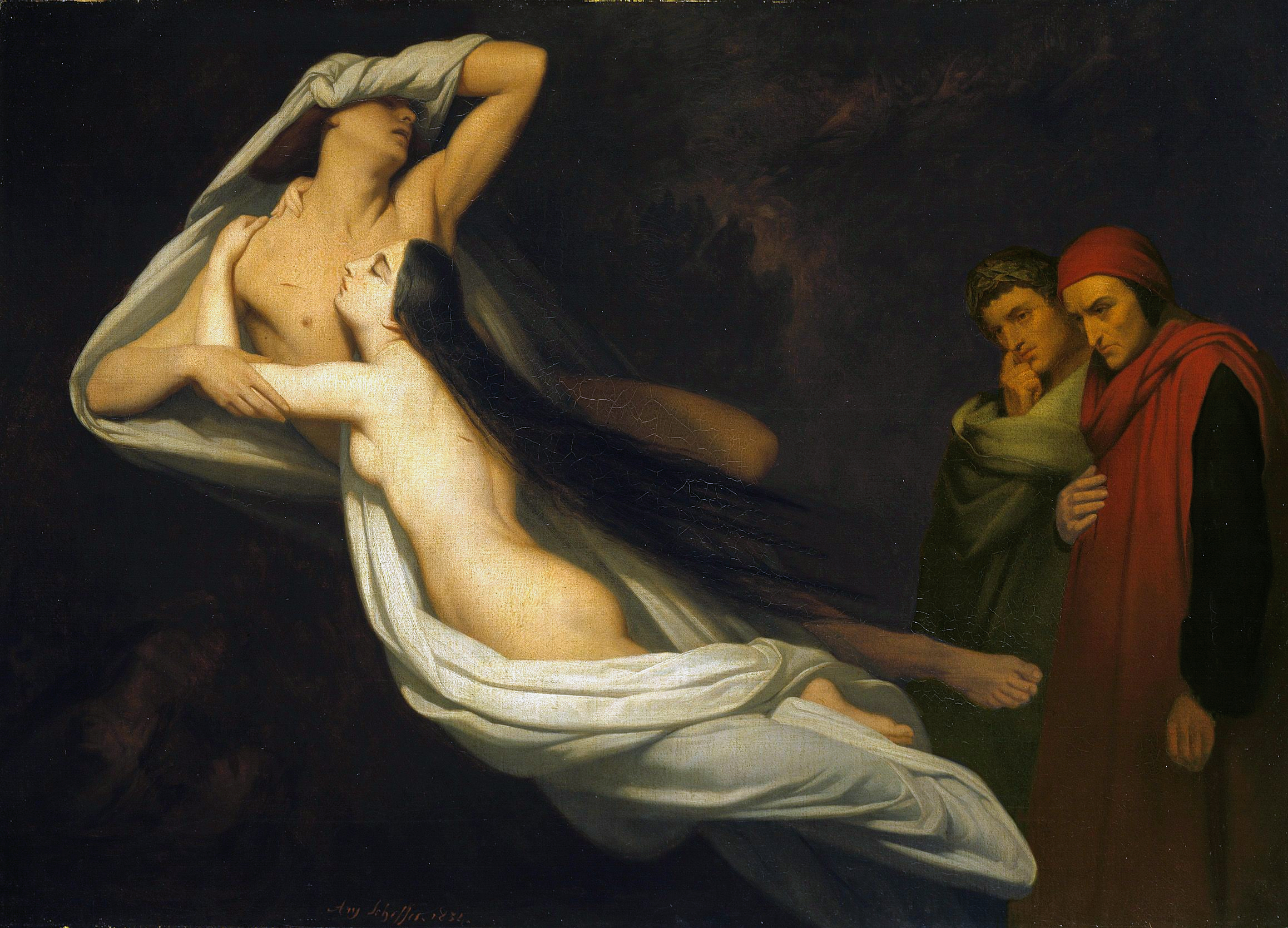
Francesca da Rimini and Paolo Malatesta Appraised by Dante and Virgil, 1854

Scheffer often painted subjects from literature, especially the works of Dante, Byron and Goethe. Two versions of Dante and Beatrice have been preserved at Wolverhampton Art Gallery, United Kingdom, and Museum of Fine Arts, Boston, US. His L'Enterrement du Jeune Pêcheur, illustrating a scene from Walter Scott's The Antiquary and taking inspiration from David Wilkie's Distraining for Rent, was exhibited at the Salon of 1824. Particularly highly praised was his Francesca da Rimini, painted in 1836, which illustrates a scene from Dante Alighieri's Inferno. In the piece the entwined bodies of Francesca di Rimini and Paolo Malatesta swirl around in the never-ending tempest that is the second circle of Hell. The illusion of movement is created by the drapery that envelopes the couple, as well as by Francesca's flowing hair. These two figures create a diagonal line that intersects the majority of the canvas creating not only a sense of movement, but also giving the painting an air of instability. Francesca clings to Paolo as he turns his face away in anguish. There are an additional two figures in the image: hidden in the background, the poets Dante and Virgil look on as they make their way through the nine circles of Hell.

Scheffer's popular Faust-themed paintings include Margaret at her wheel; Faust doubting; Margaret at the Sabbat; Margaret leaving church; The garden walk, and Margaret at the well. In 1836, he painted two pictures of Goethe's character Mignon: Mignon desires her fatherland (1836), and Mignon yearns for heaven (1851).

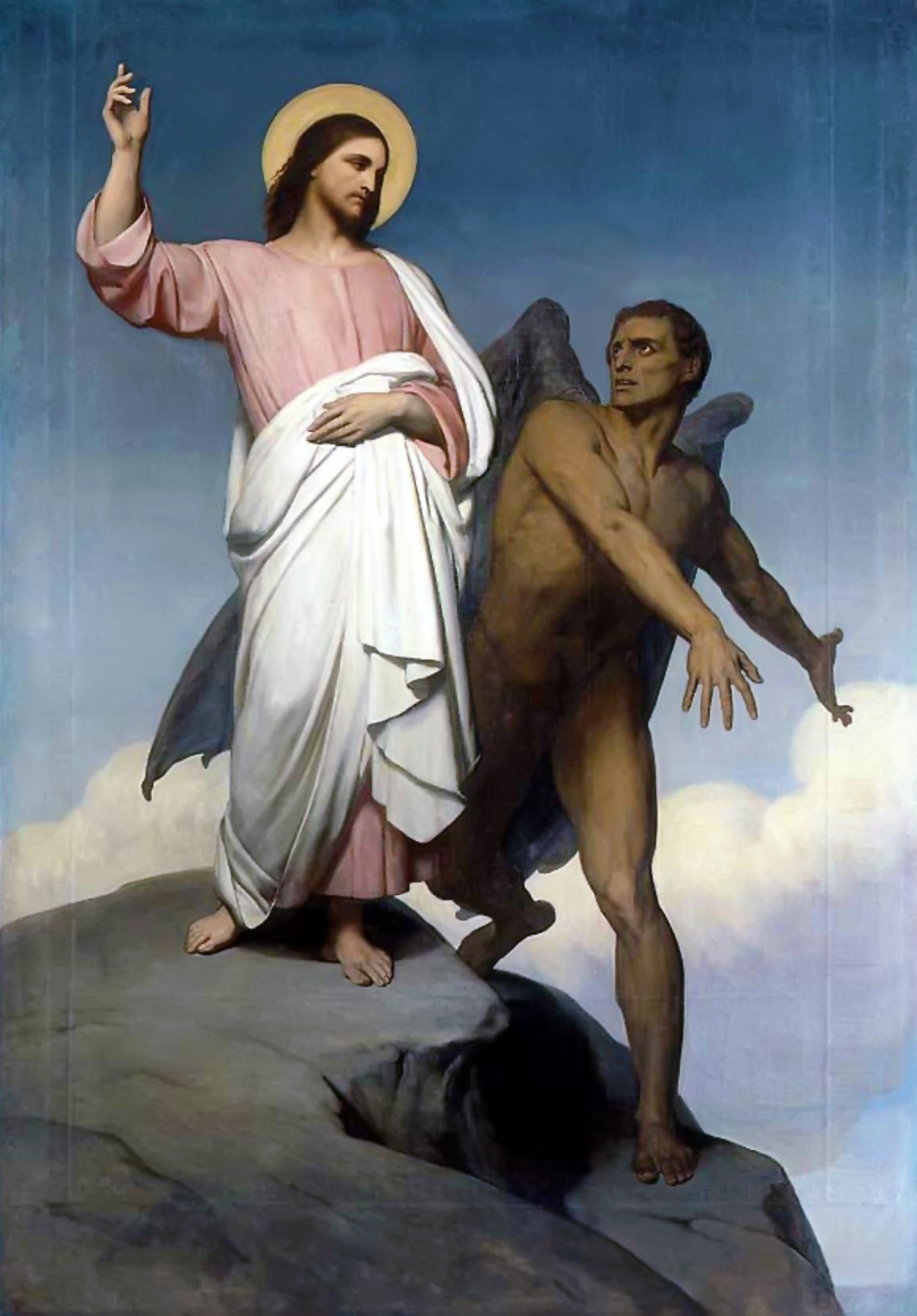
Temptation of Christ, 1854

He now turned to religious subjects: Christus Consolator (1836) was followed by Christus Remunerator, The shepherds led by the star (1837), The Magi laying down their crowns, Christ in the Garden of Olives, Christ bearing his Cross, Christ interred (1845), and St Augustine and Monica (1846).

One of the reduced versions of his Christus Consolator (the prime version today to be found in the Van Gogh Museum, Amsterdam), lost for 70 years, was rediscovered in a janitor's closet in Gethsemane Lutheran Church in Dassel, Minnesota, in 2007. It has been restored and is on display at the Minneapolis Institute of Art.

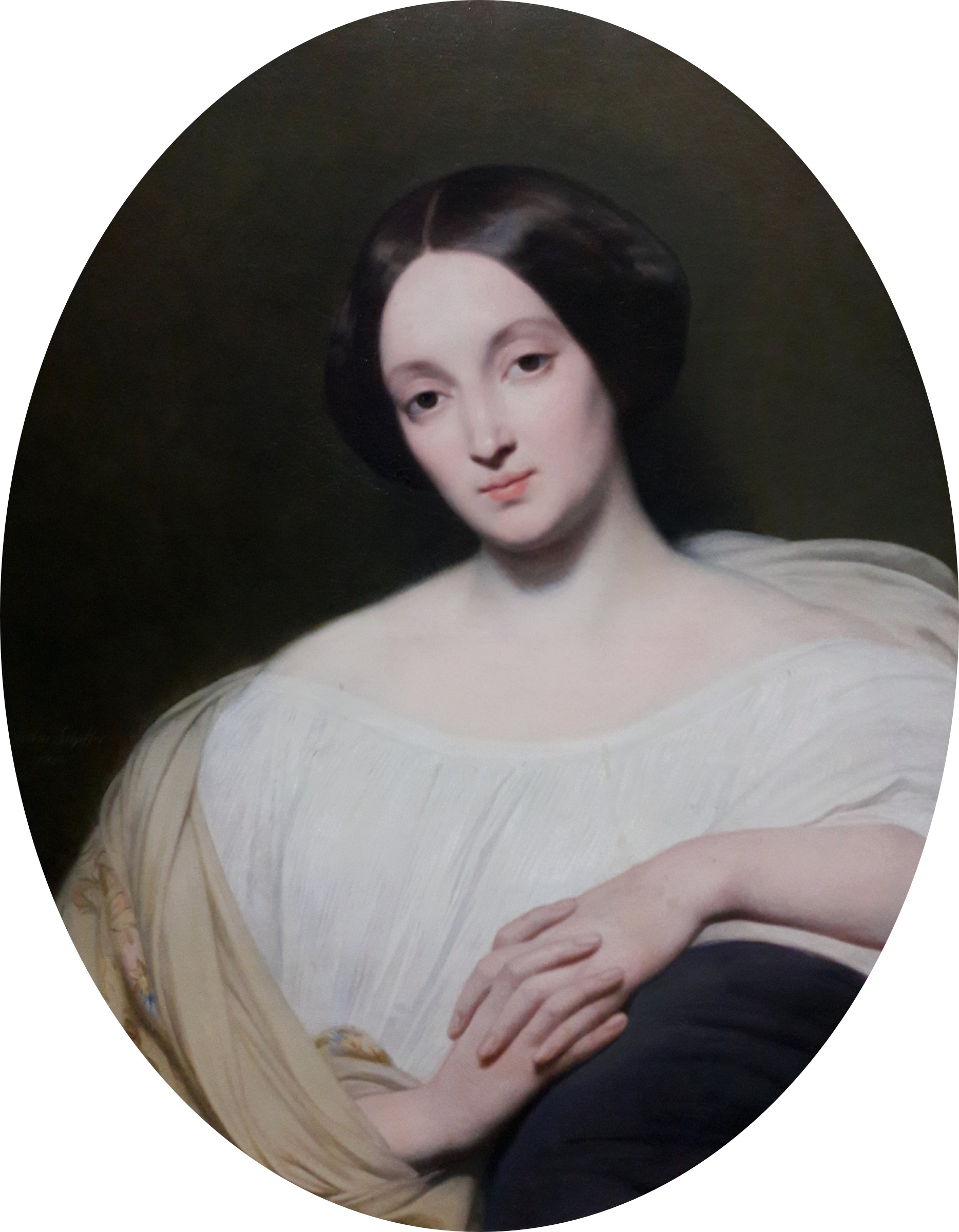
Portrait of Katarzyna Potocka, 1850 (National Museum, Warsaw)

Scheffer was also an accomplished portrait painter, finishing 500 portraits in total. His subjects included composers Frédéric Chopin and Franz Liszt, the Marquis de la Fayette, Pierre-Jean de Béranger, Alphonse de Lamartine, Charles Dickens, Duchess de Broglie, Talleyrand and Queen Marie Amélie.

After 1846, he ceased to exhibit. His strong ties with the royal family caused him to fall out of favour when, in 1848, the Second Republic came into being. Scheffer was made commander of the Legion of Honour in 1848, that is, after he had wholly withdrawn from the Salon. Shut up in his studio, he produced many paintings that were only exhibited after his death in 1858.

The works, first exhibited posthumously, include Sorrows of the earth, and the Angel announcing the Resurrection, which he had left unfinished. By the time of his death, his reputation was damaged and was further undermined by the sale of the Paturle Gallery, which contained many of his most celebrated achievements: though his paintings were praised for their charm and facility, they were condemned for poor use of color and vapid sentiment.

== Friends and family ==
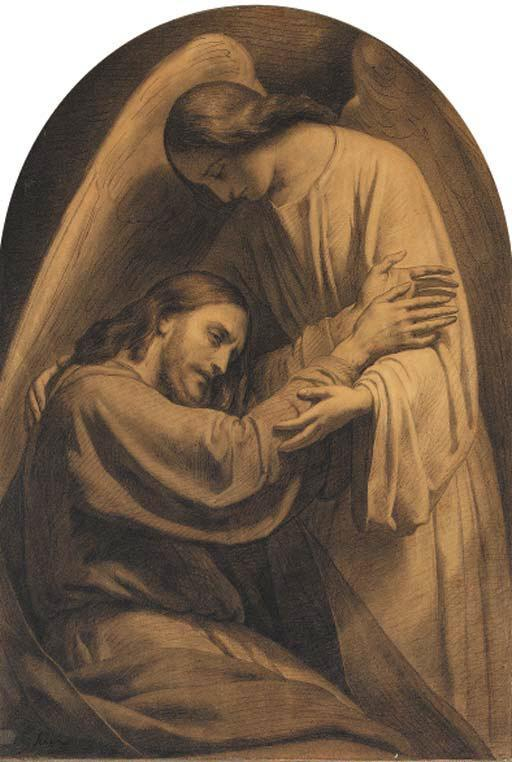
Jesus and Angel, between 1848 and 1858

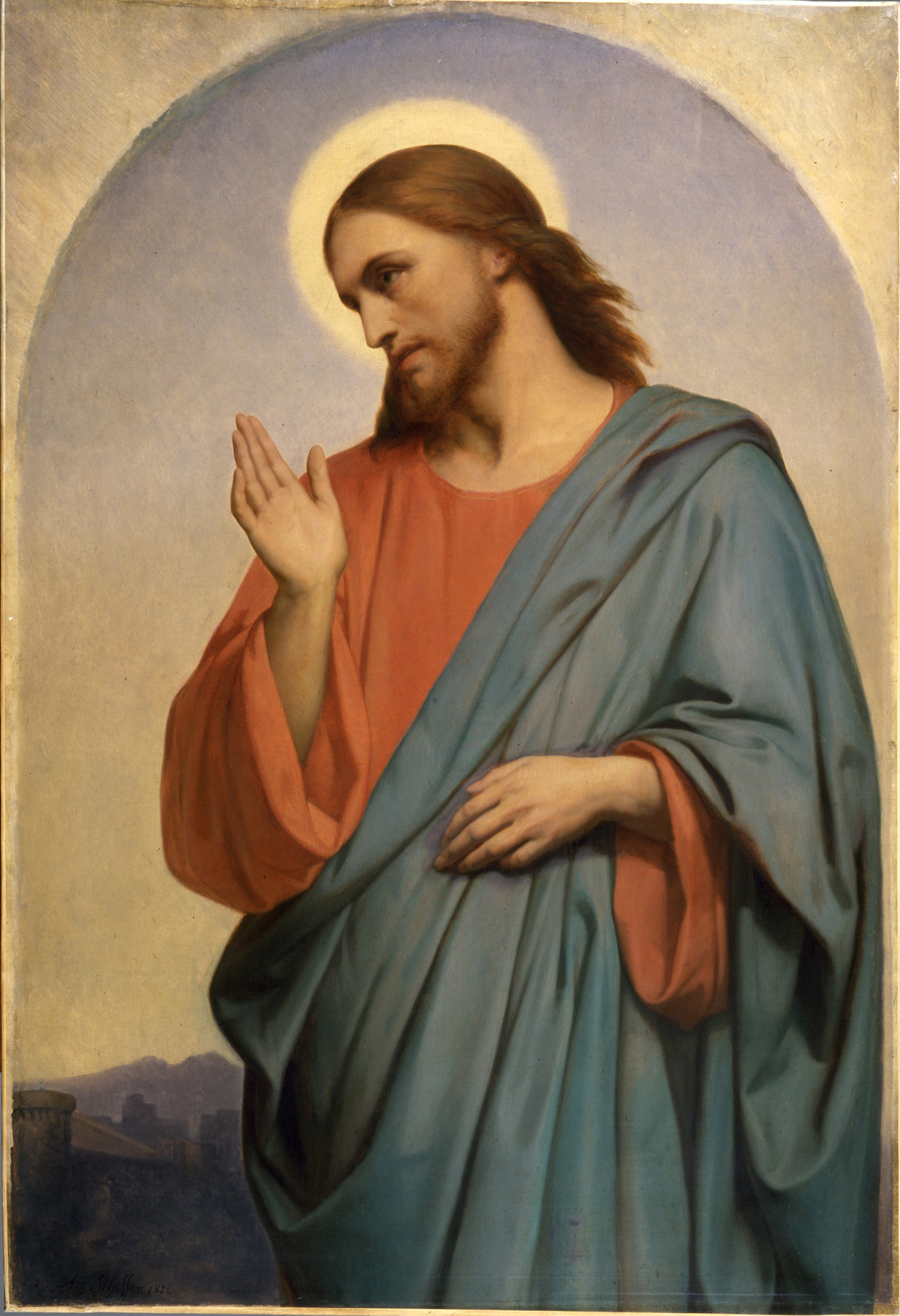
Christ Weeping Over Jerusalem, 1851

At various times Maurice Sand, Scheffer, Charles Gounod, Hector Berlioz were in relationships with Pauline Viardot—in letters they claimed that they were in love with her. She wrote in one letter:

Louis and Scheffer (Scheffer was the best friend of Louis Viardot, husband of Pauline Viardot) has always been my dearest of friends, and it is sad, that I was never able to respond to the hot and deep love of Louis, despite all my volition.

She was married to Louis Viardot at 18 years old, when her husband was a director of an Italian opera house in Paris and a friend of Scheffer. Scheffer was a confidant of Pauline Viardot and a friend of her family until his death.

In 1850 Scheffer became a French citizen and married Sophie Marin, the widow of General Marie Étienne François Henri Baudrand. Marin died in 1856.

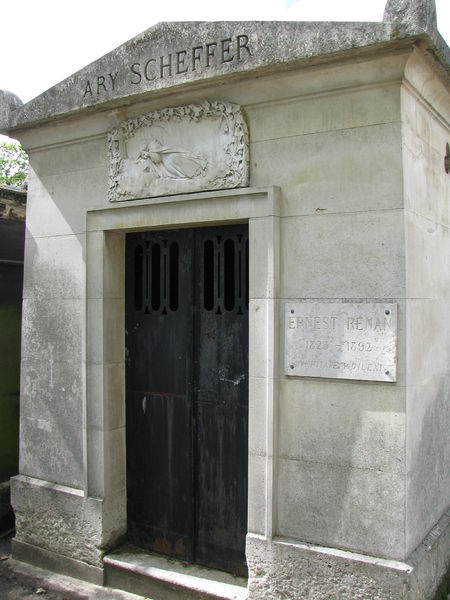
Grave in Cimetière de Montmartre (Paris)

His younger brother Hendrik Scheffer, born in The Hague on 27 September 1798, was also a painter.

== Gallery ==
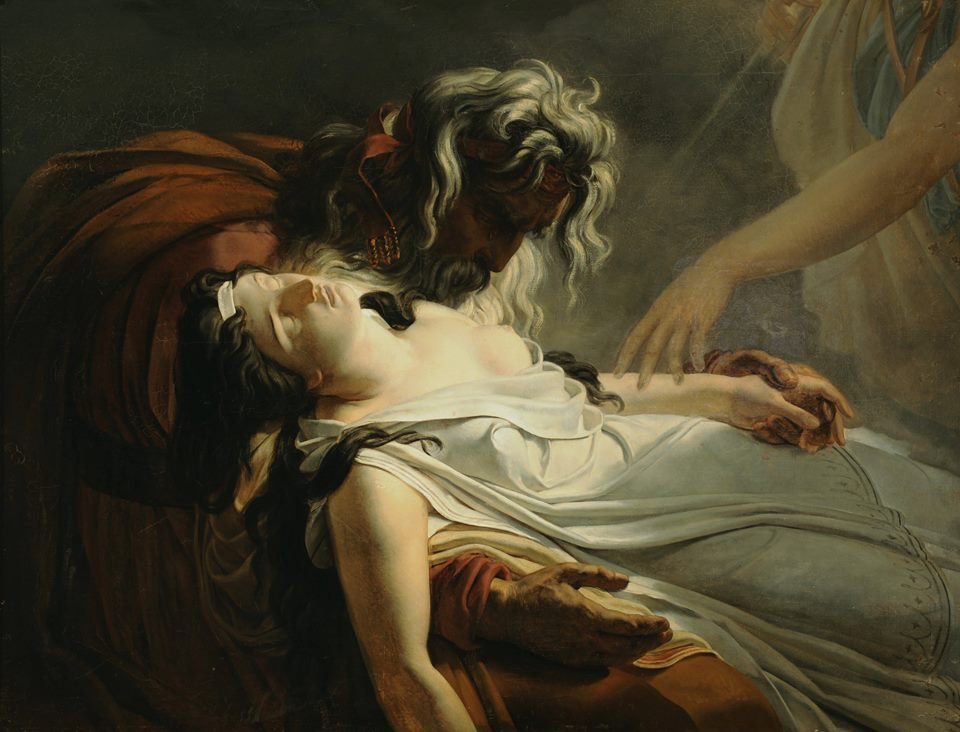
The Death of Malvina, 1811

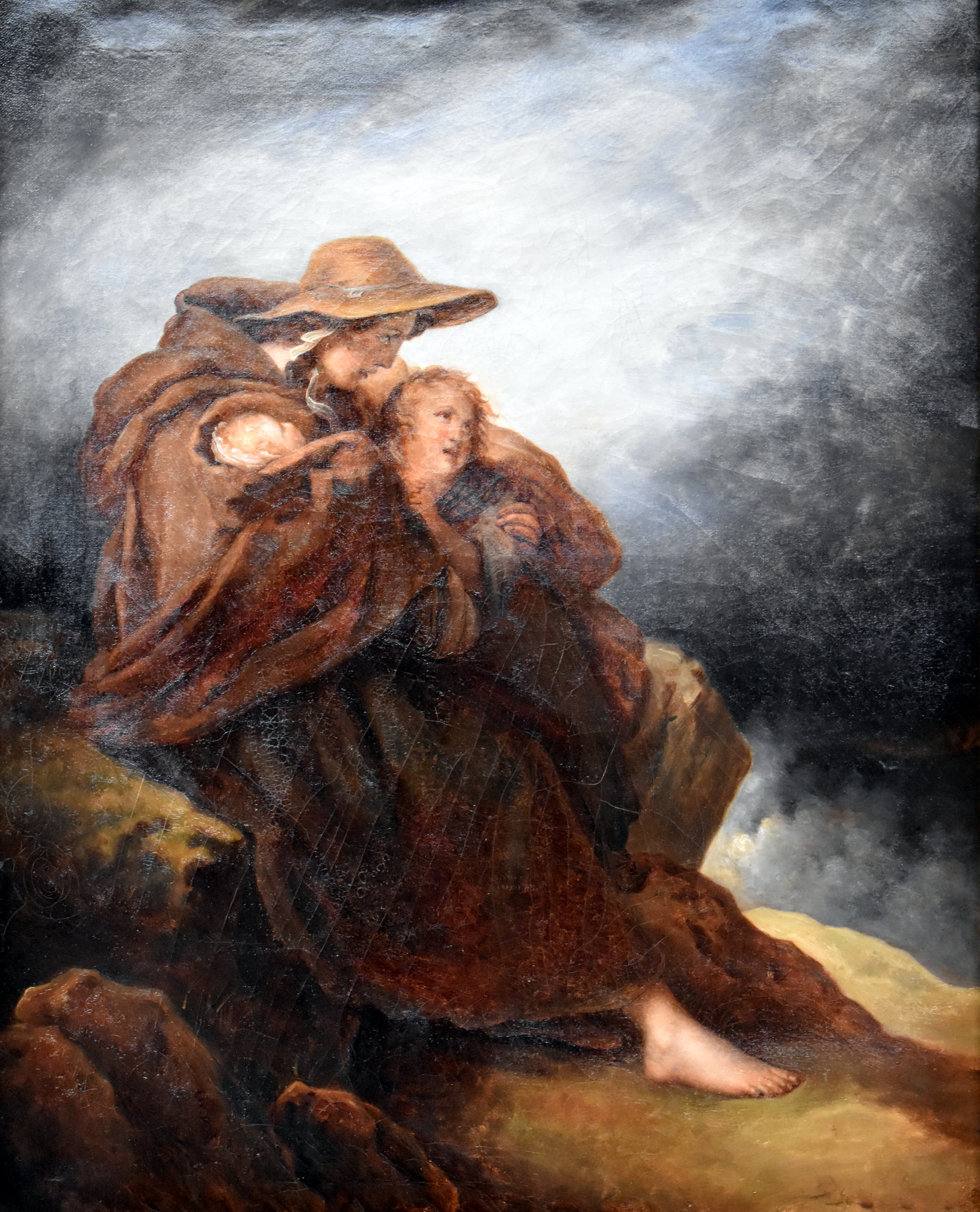
Rising Tide, 1823

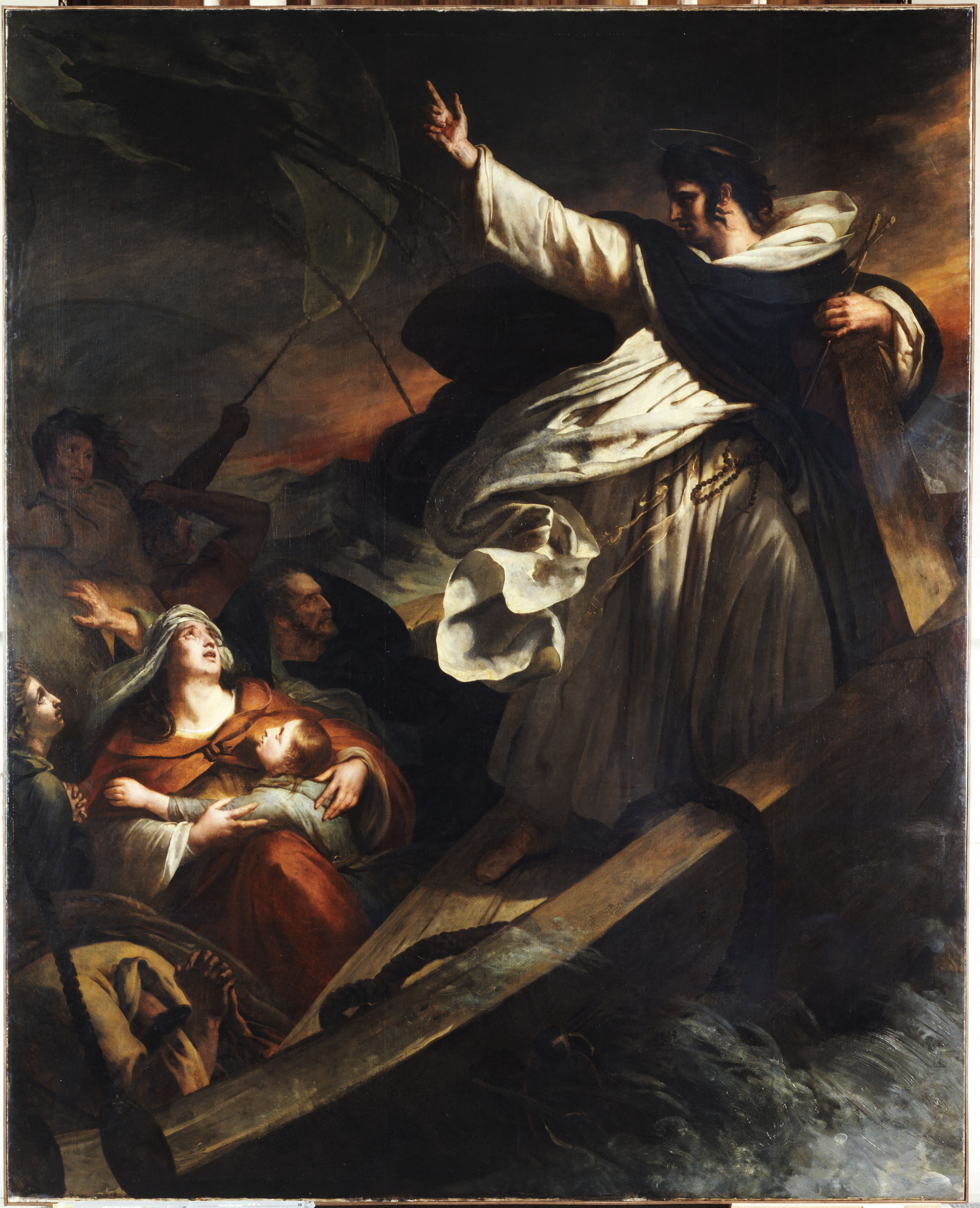
Saint Thomas Preaching During a Storm, 1823

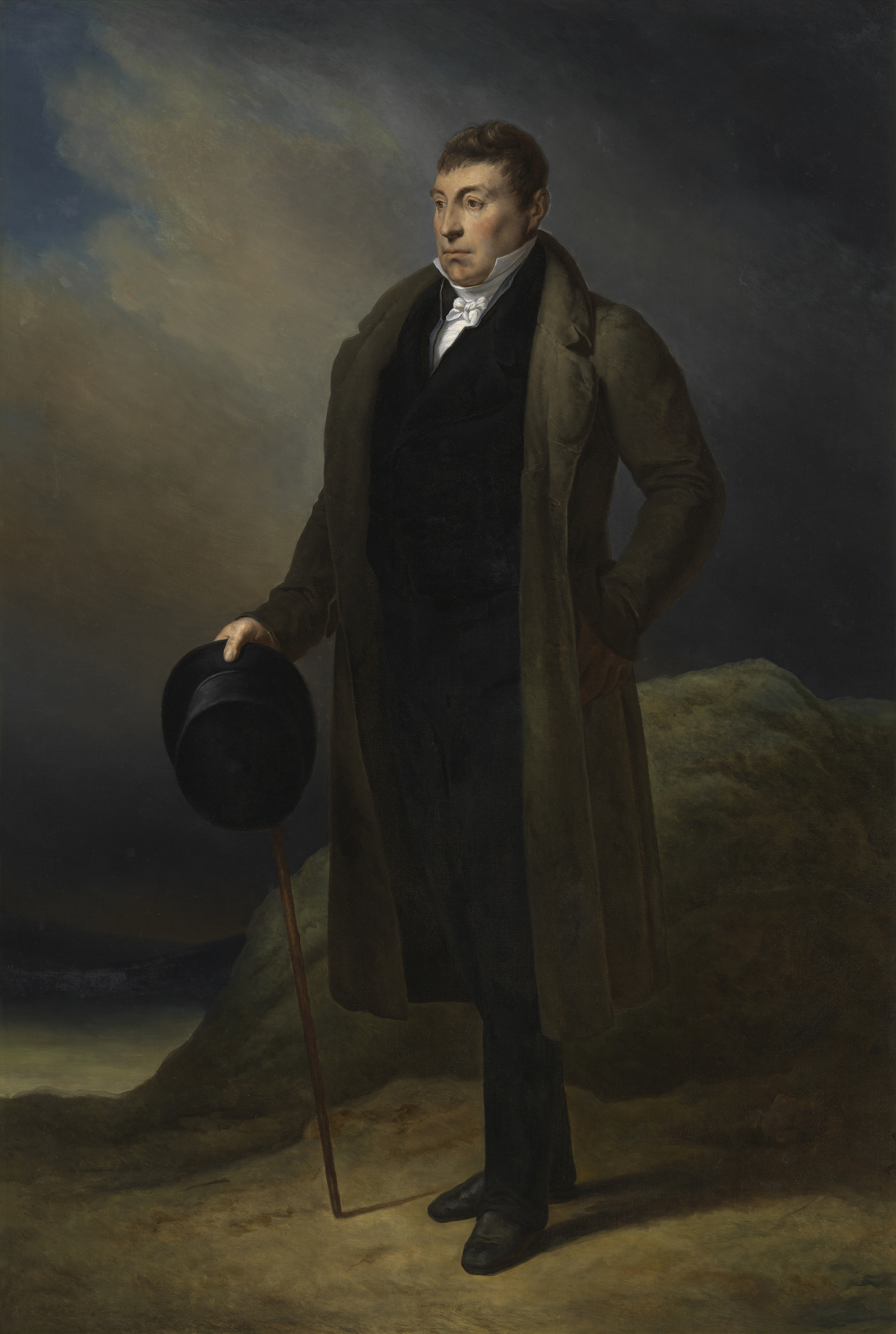
Portrait of Lafayette, 1823

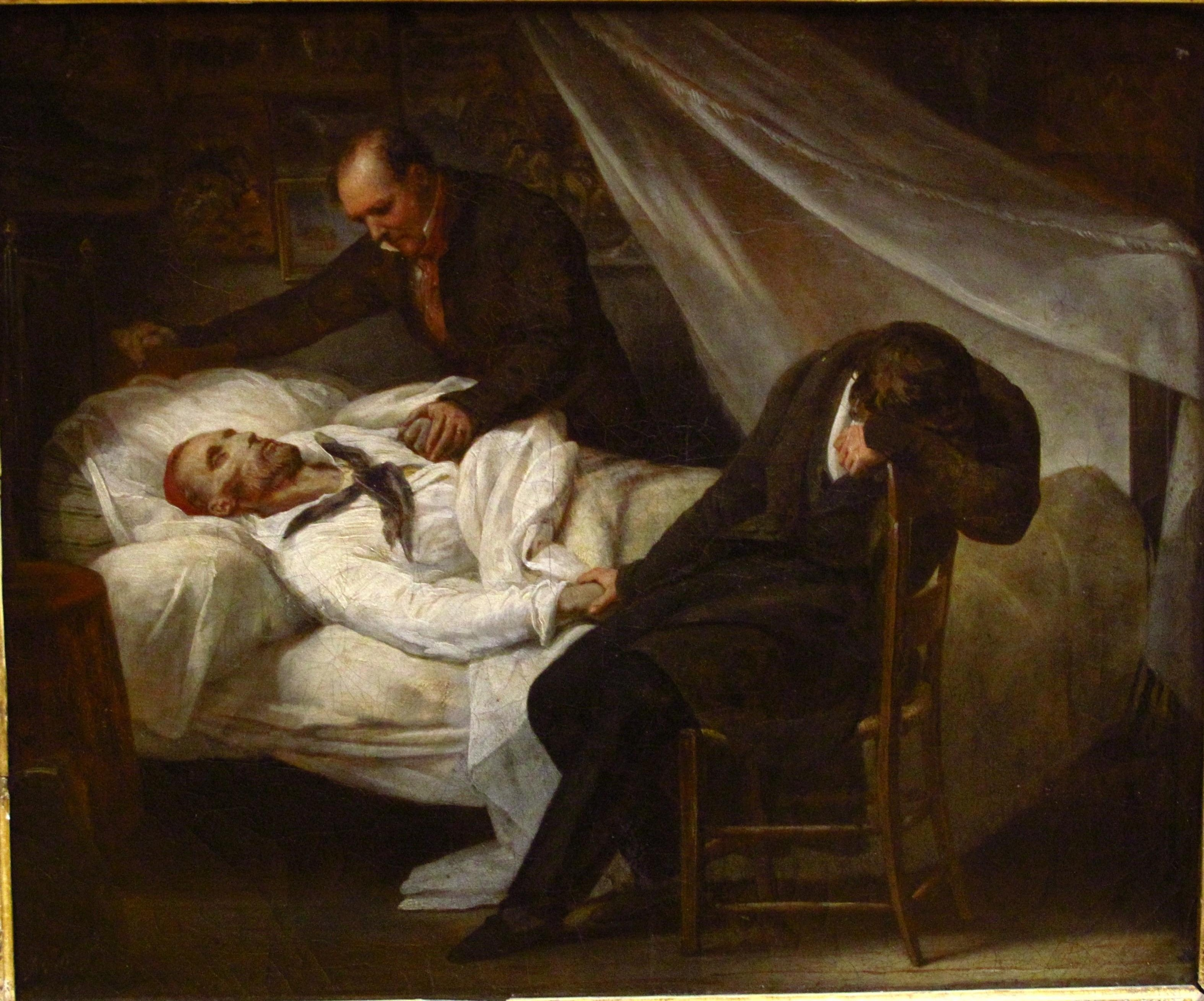
The Death of Géricault, 1824

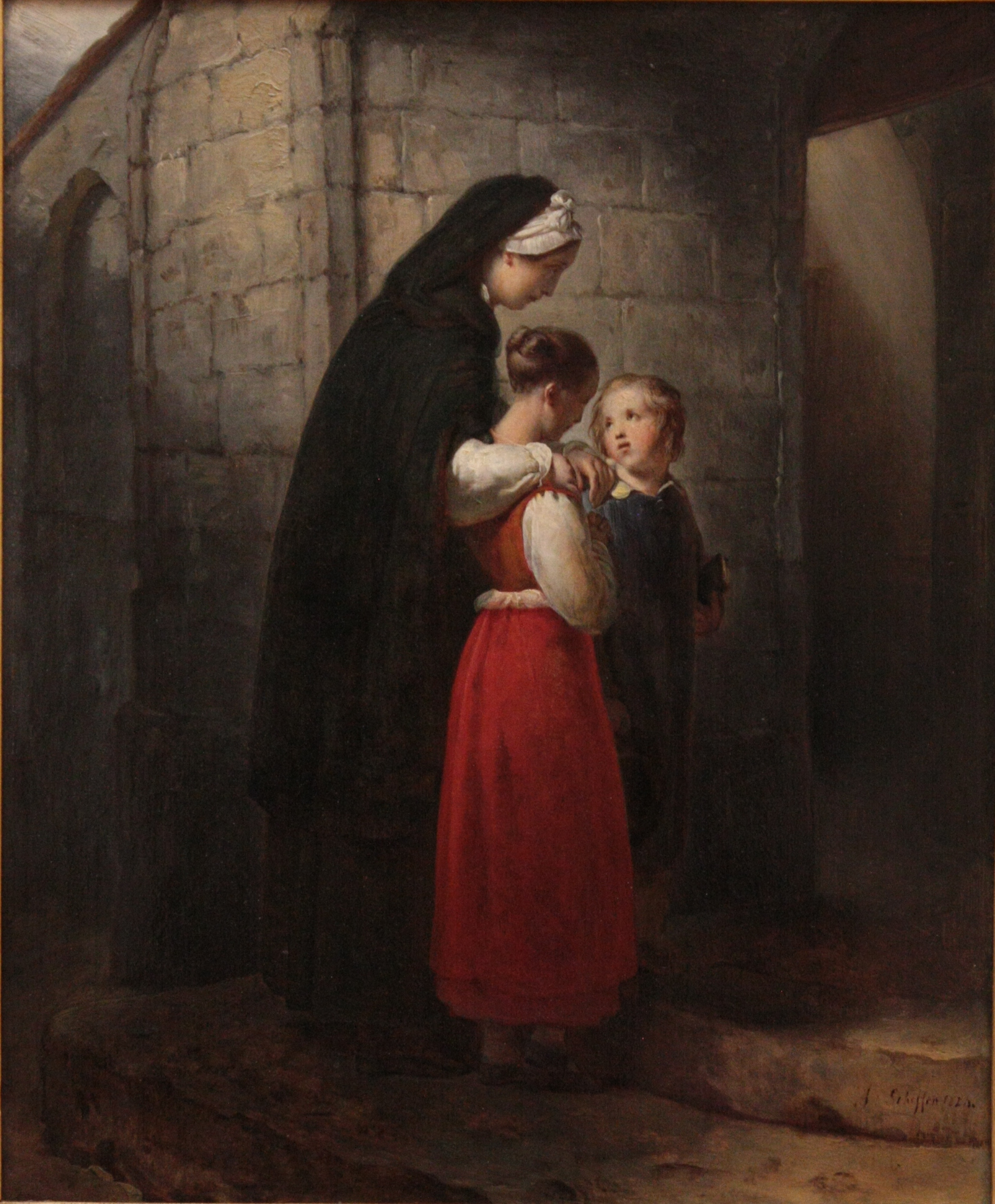
A convalescent mother and her children, 1824

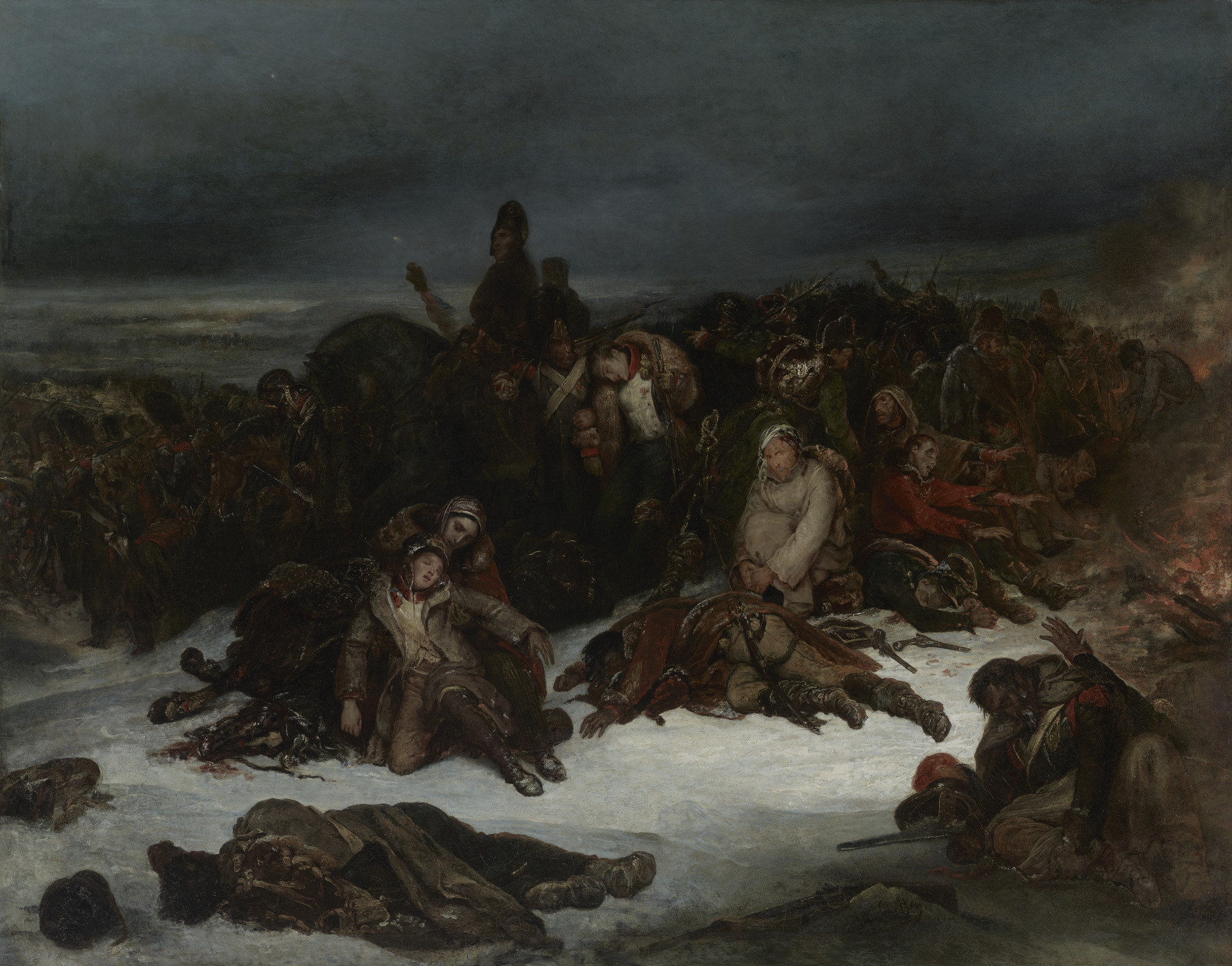
The Retreat of Napoleon's Army from Russia, 1826

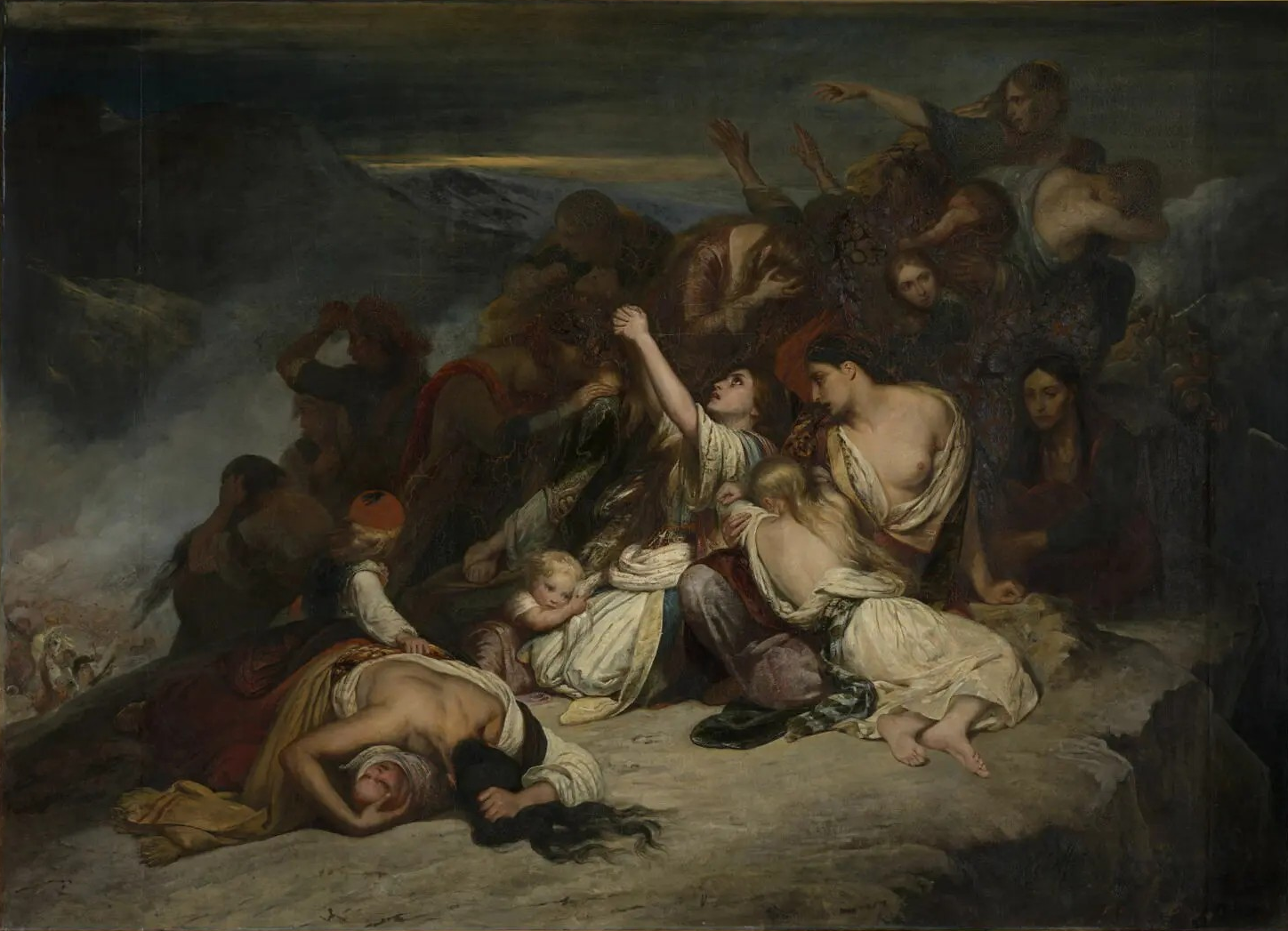
The Women of Souli, 1827

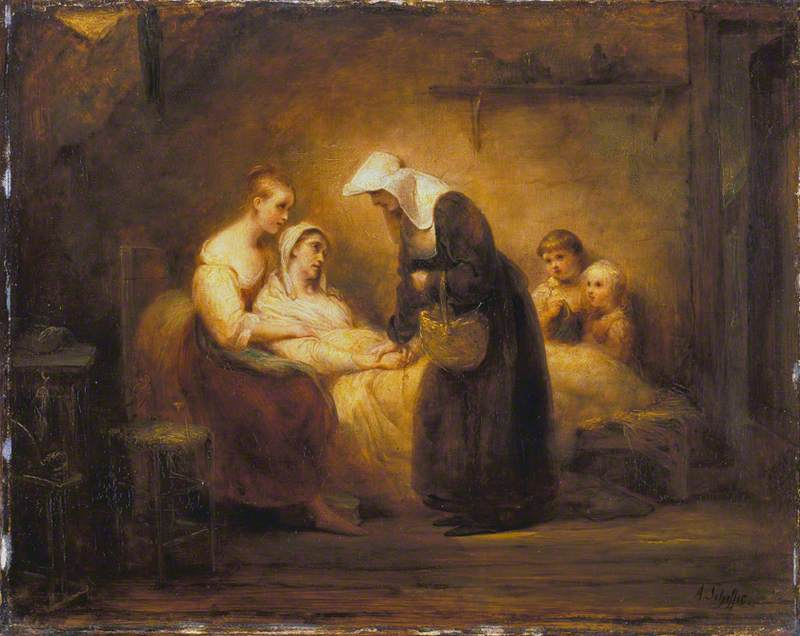
The Sister of Mercy, 1831

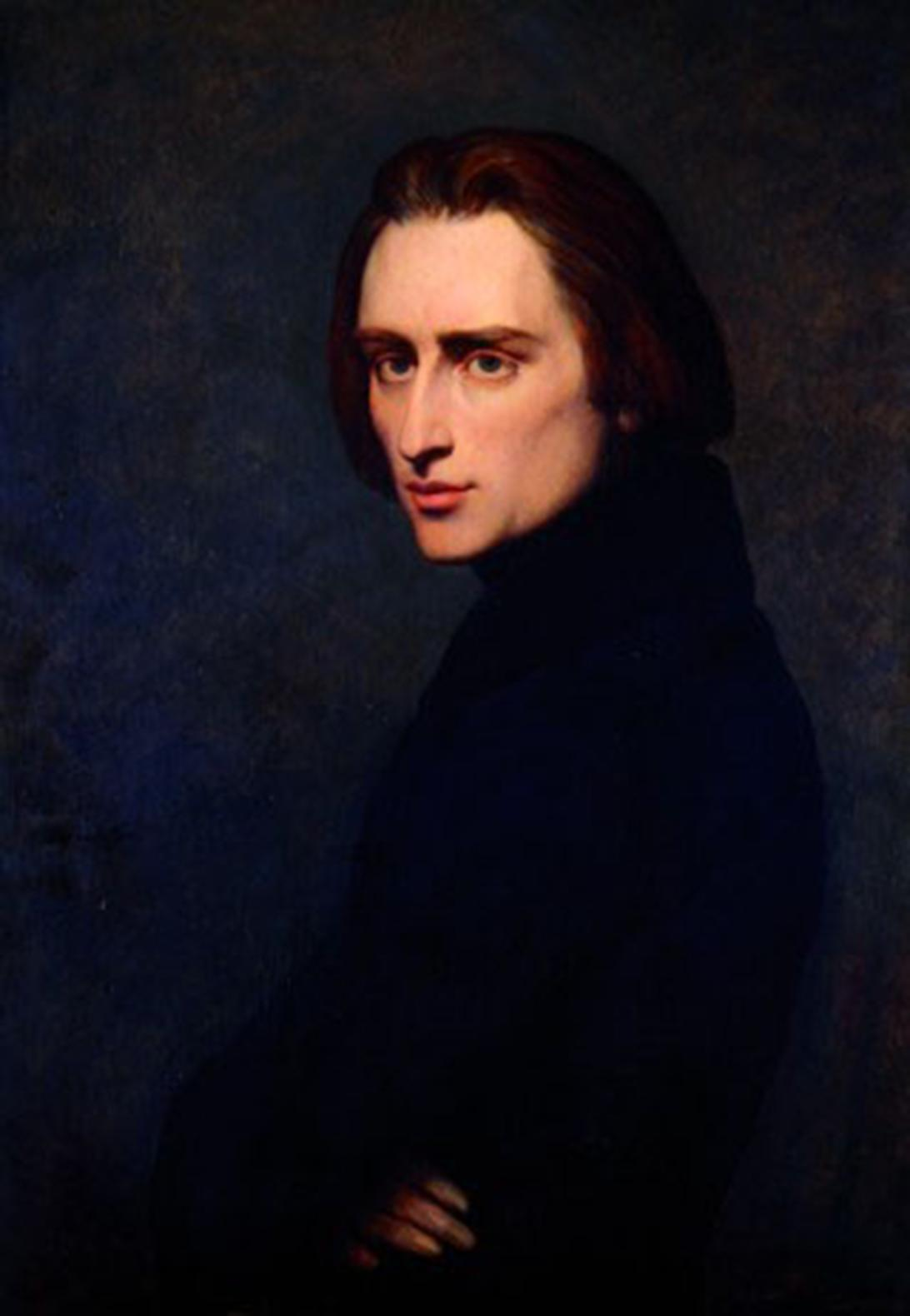
Portrait of Franz Liszt, 1837

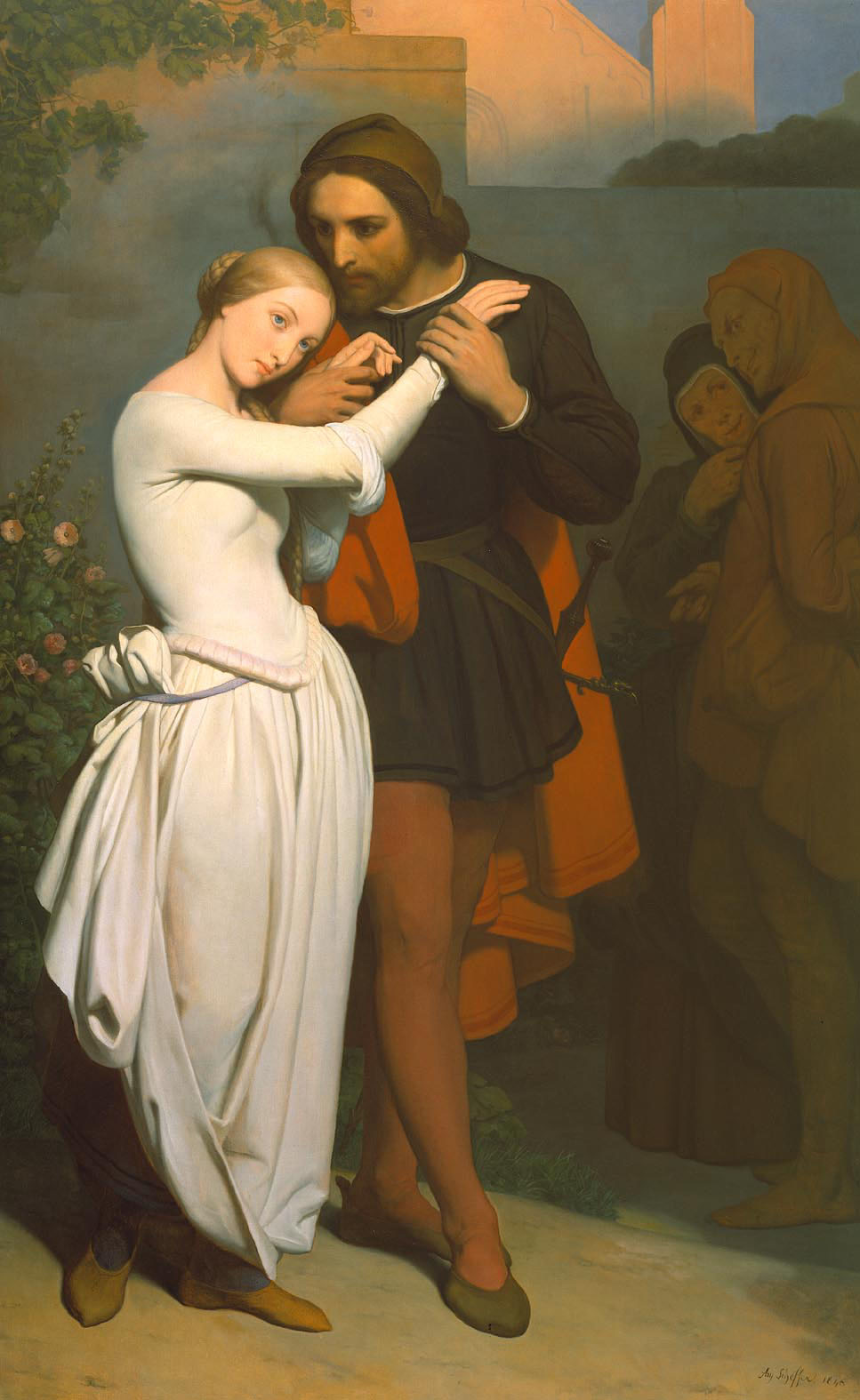
Faust and Marguerite in the Garden, 1846

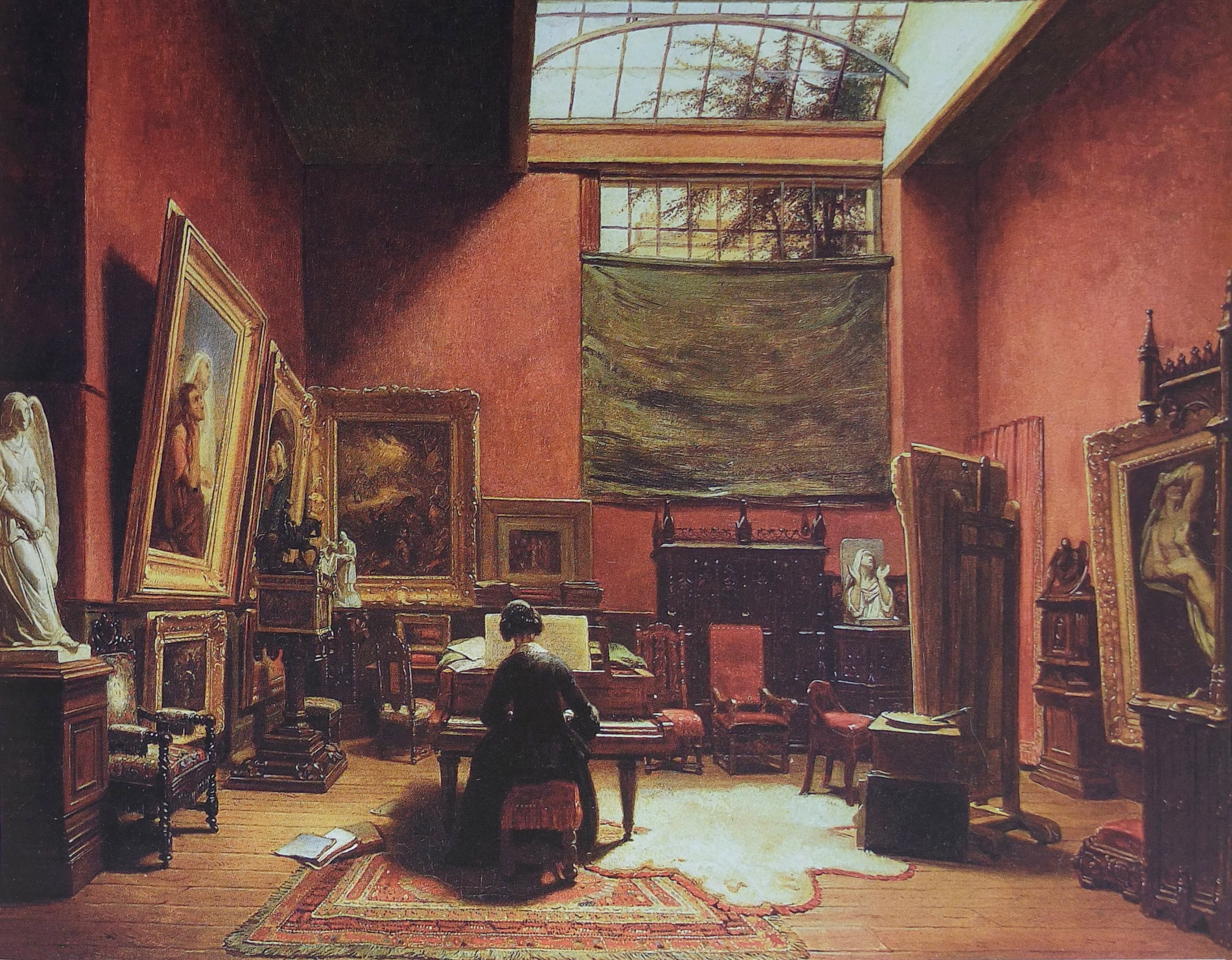
Le petit atelier, 1850

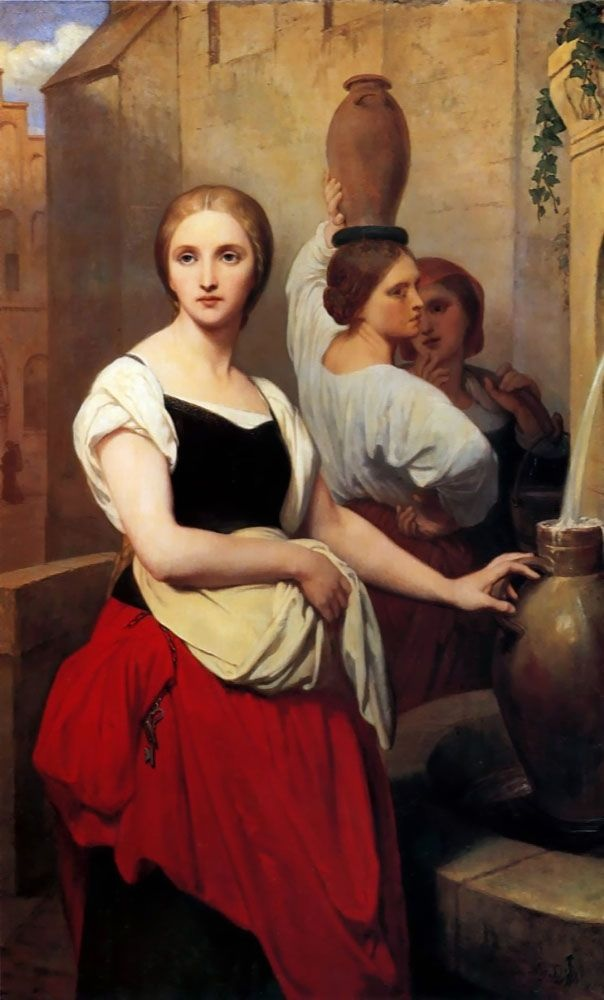
Marguerite at the fountain, 1858

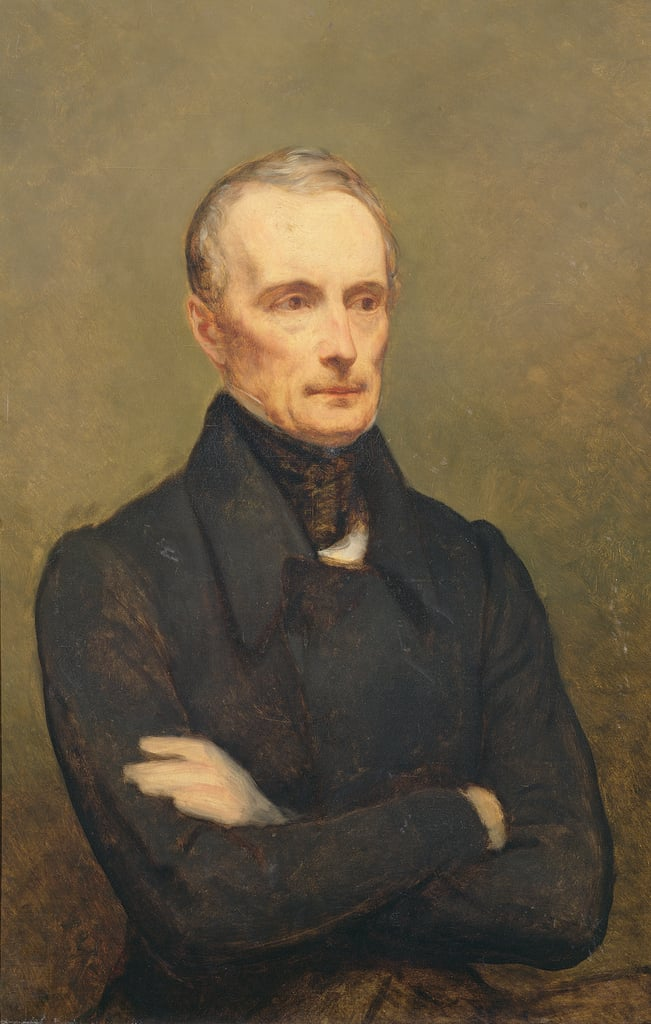
Portrait of Lamartine

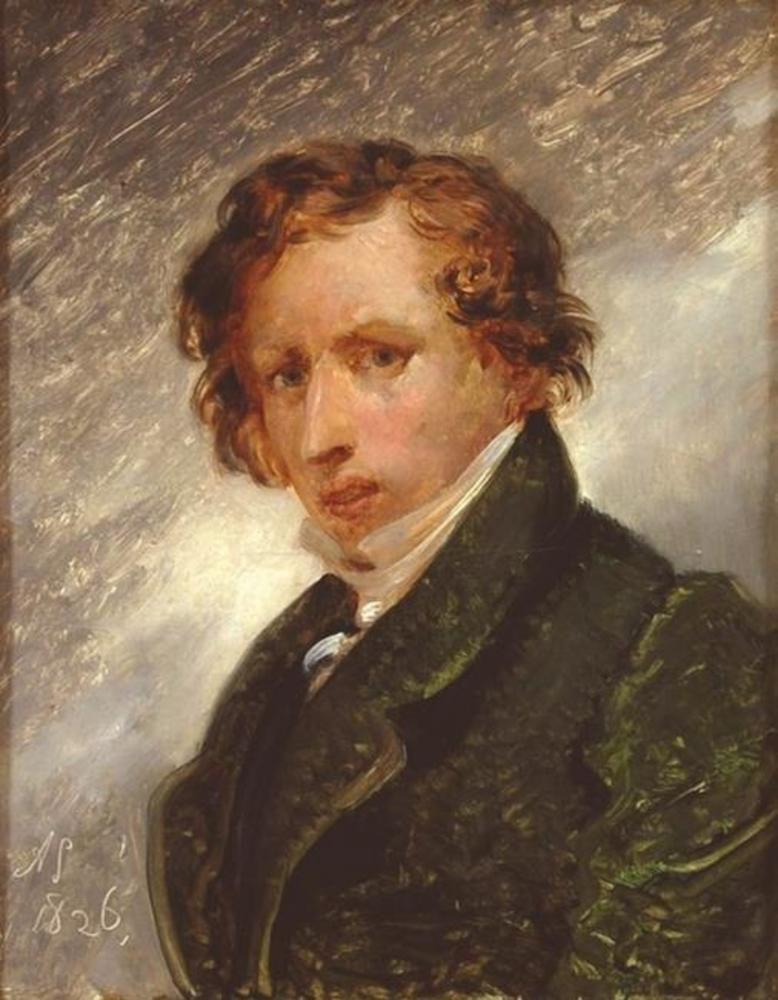
Self-portrait

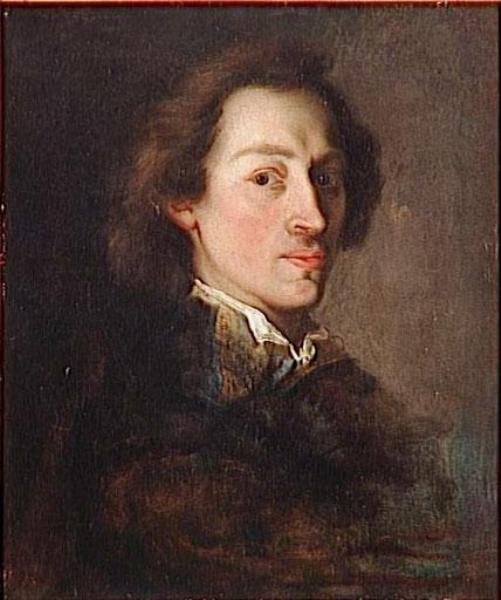
Chopin by Scheffer

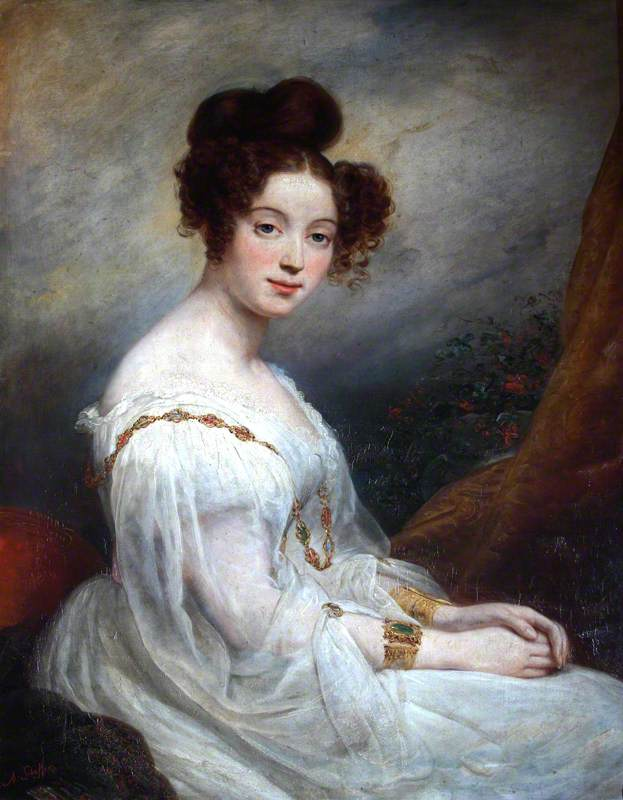
Charlotte, wife of Anselm Salomon von Rothschild

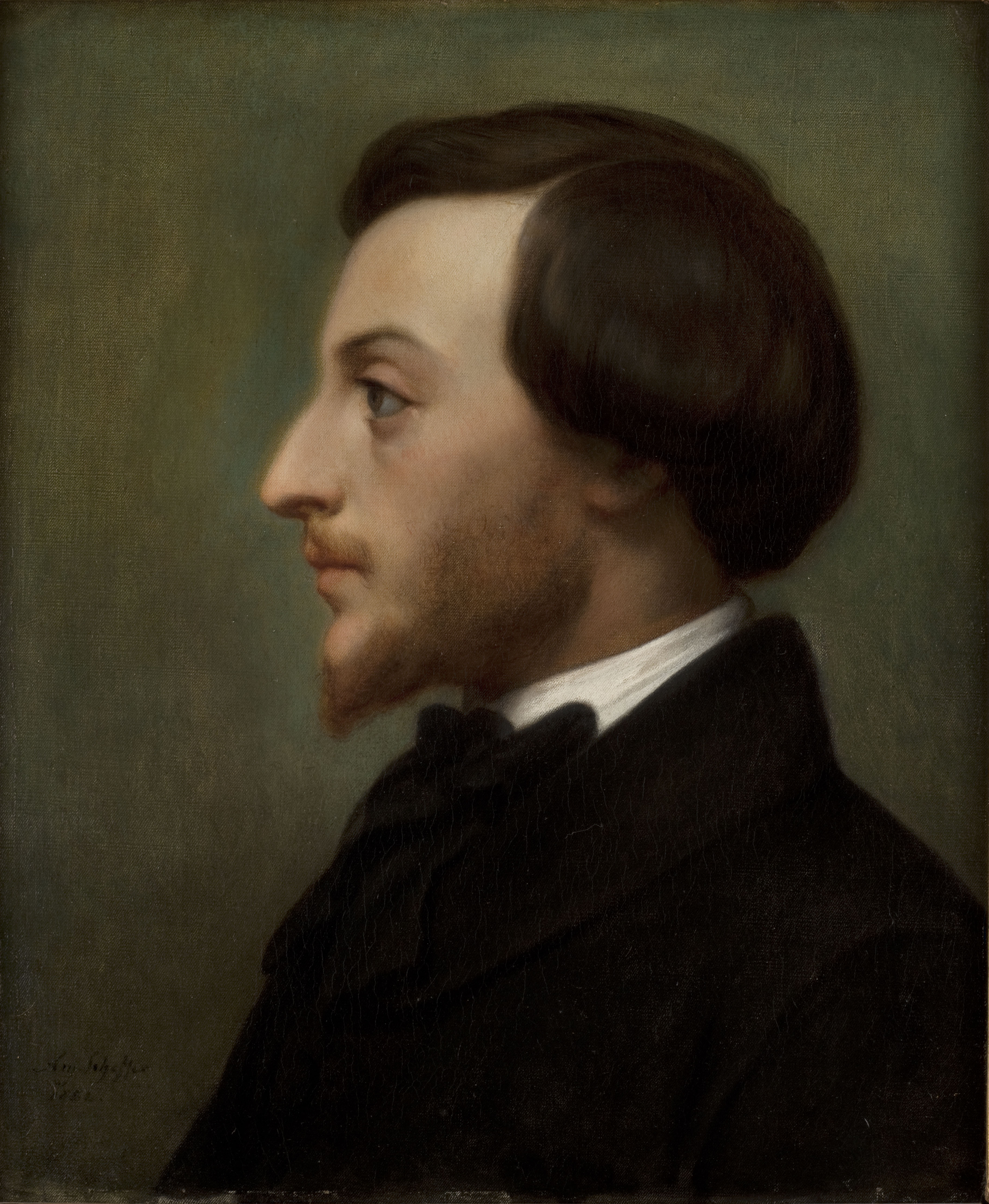
Louis Ratisbonne

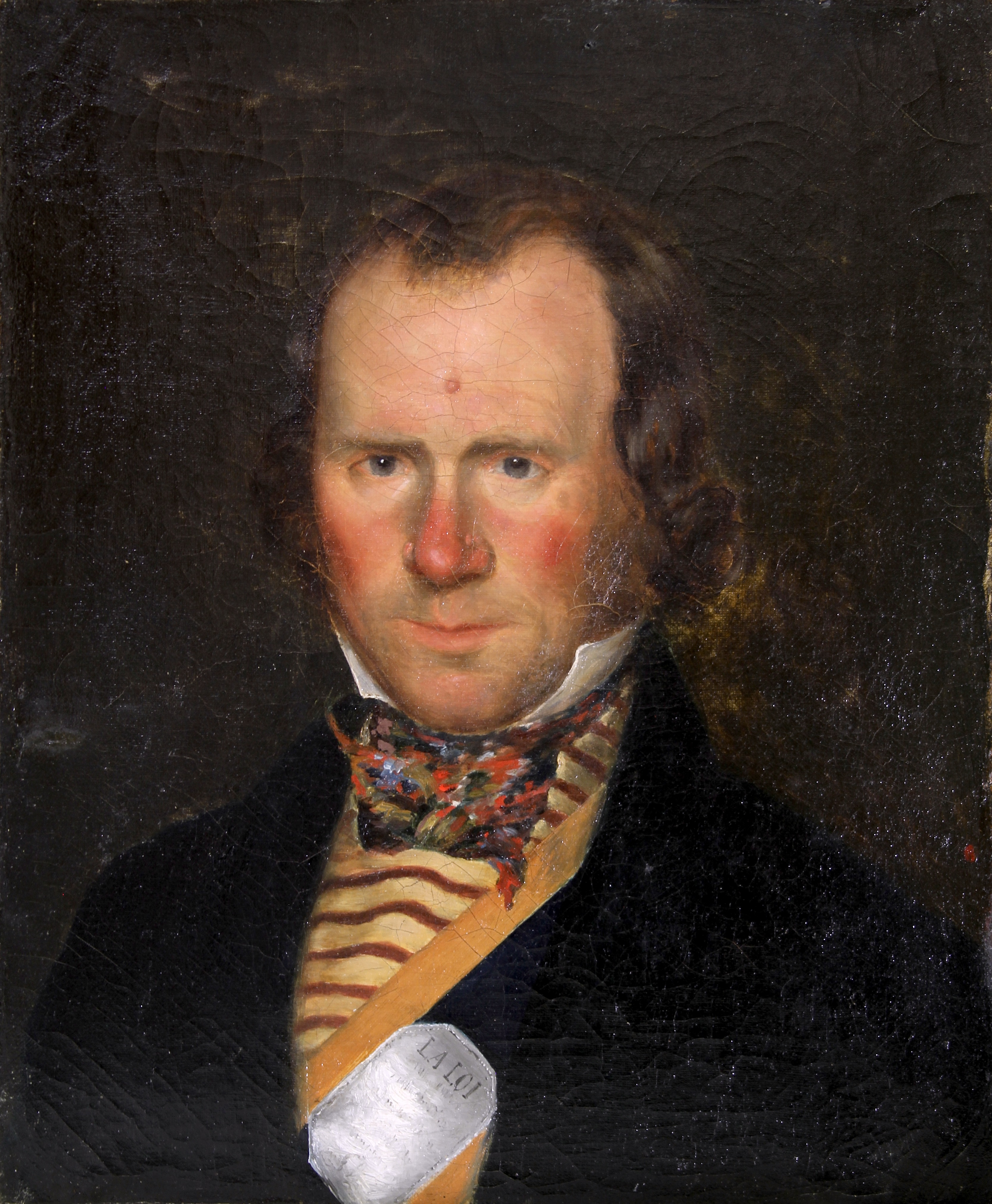
Richard Cobden

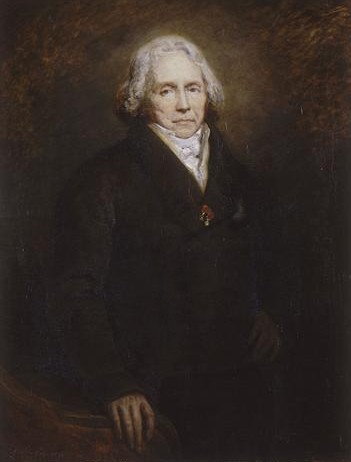
Portrait of Talleyrand, 1828

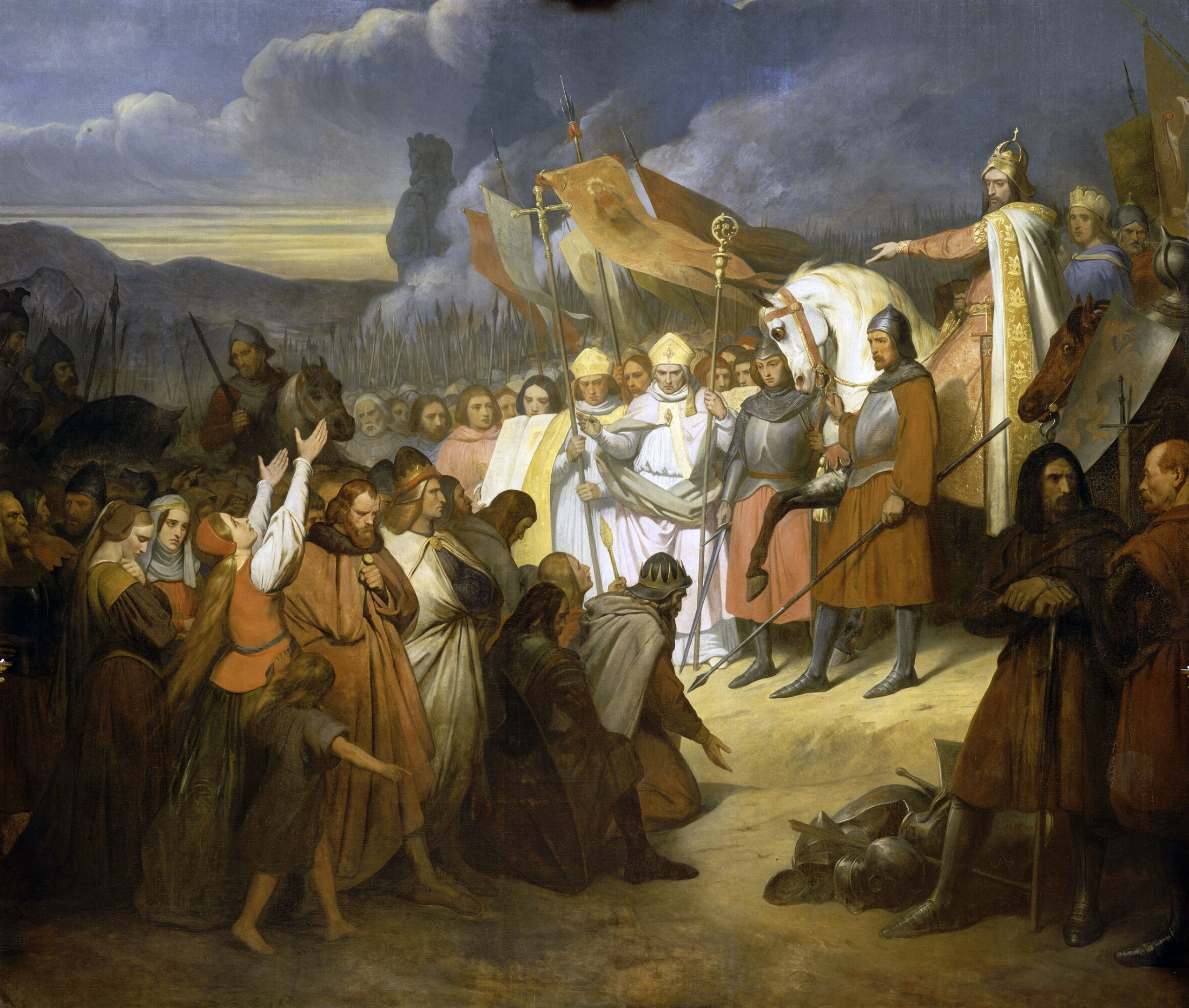
Charlemagne receiving the submission of Widukind at Paderborn in 785, painted c. 1840

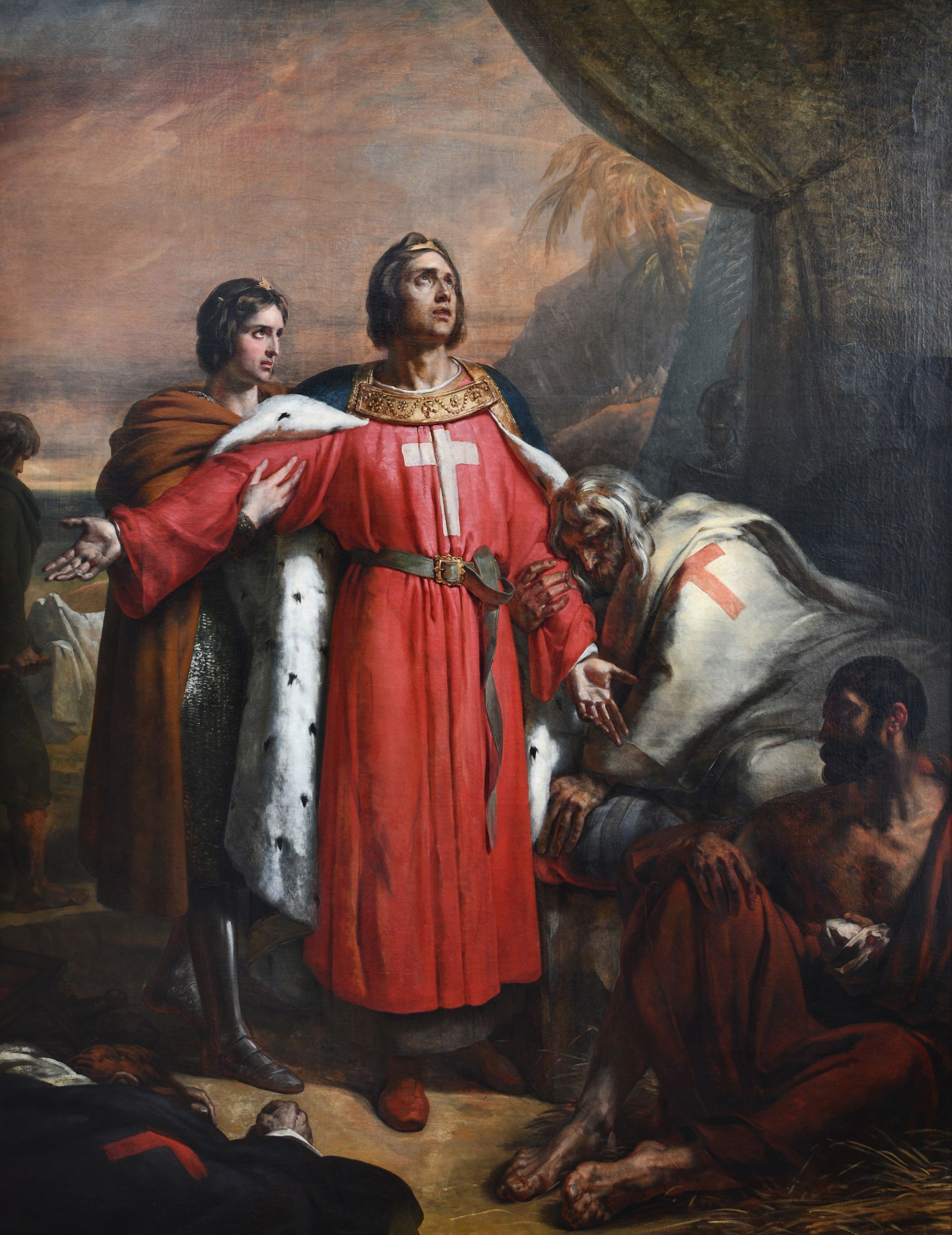
Saint Louis visitant les pestiférés (1822)

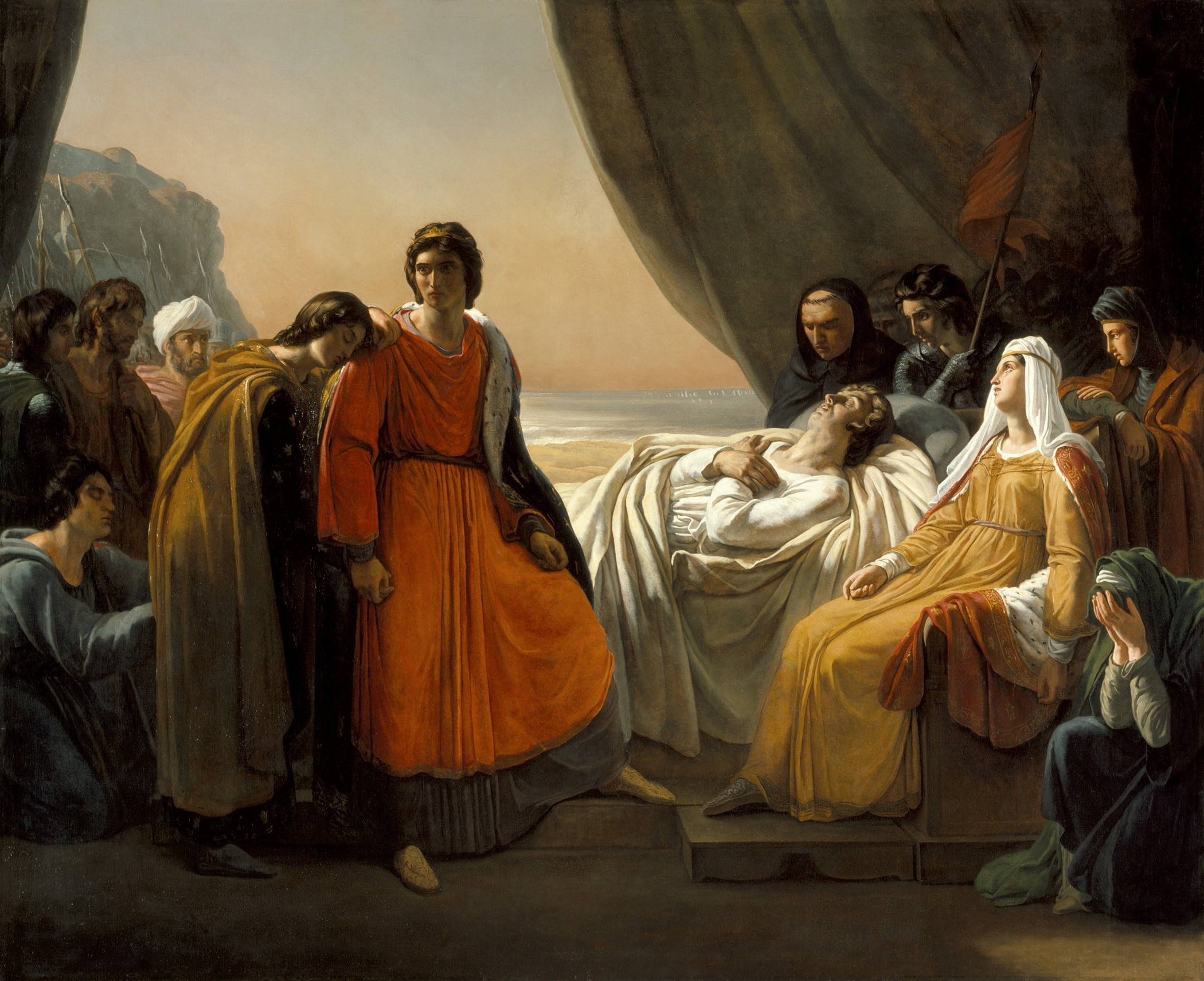
Death of Saint Louis

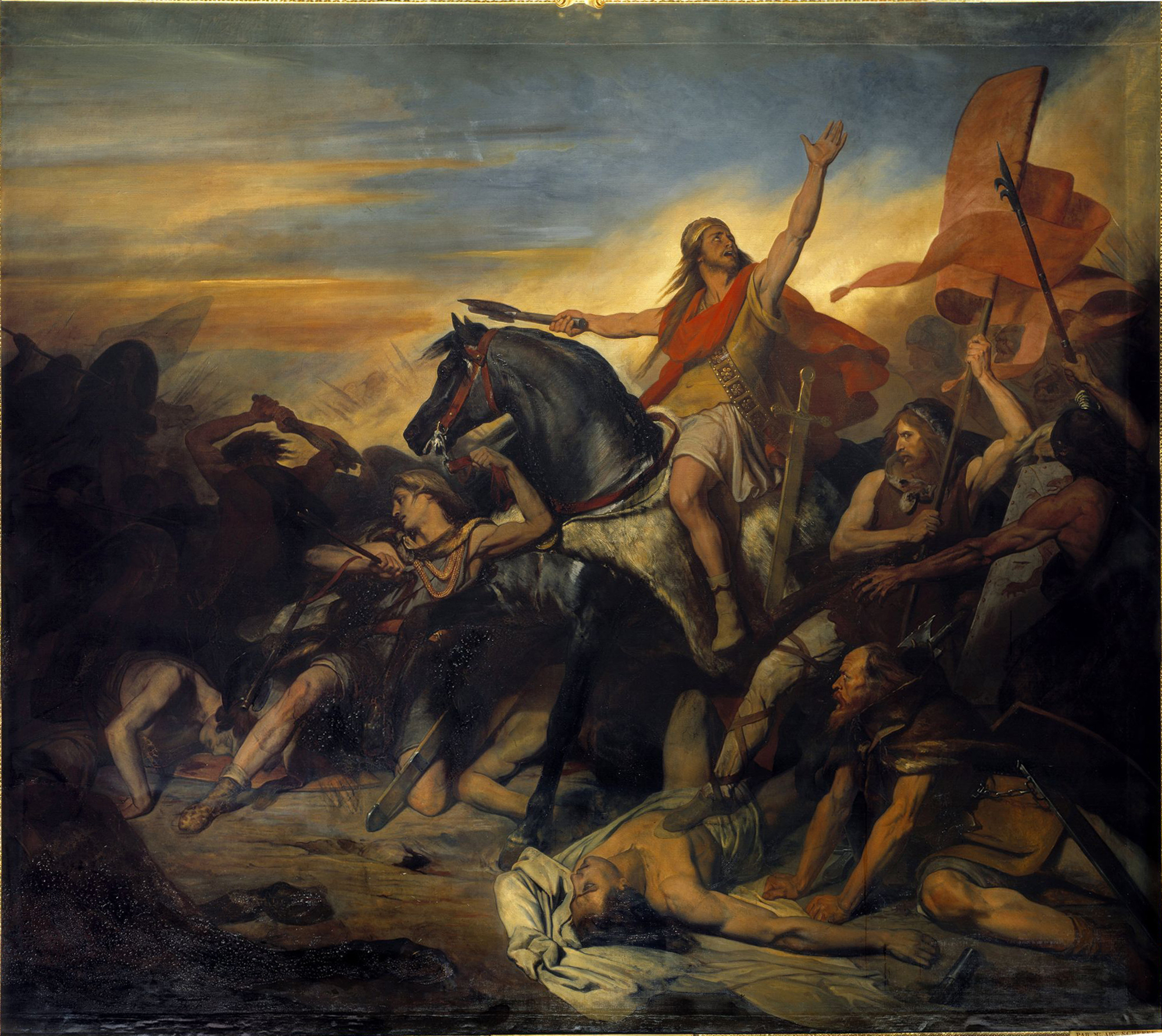
The Battle of Tolbiac, 1836

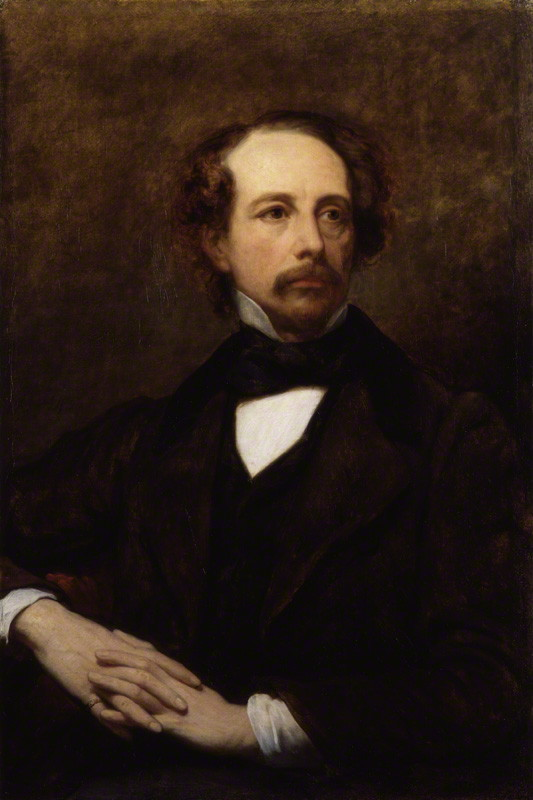
Portrait of Charles Dickens, 1855

== See also ==
- Musée de la Vie Romantique, Hôtel Scheffer-Renan, Paris
