= The Retreat of Napoleon's Army from Russia =

Painting by Ary Scheffer

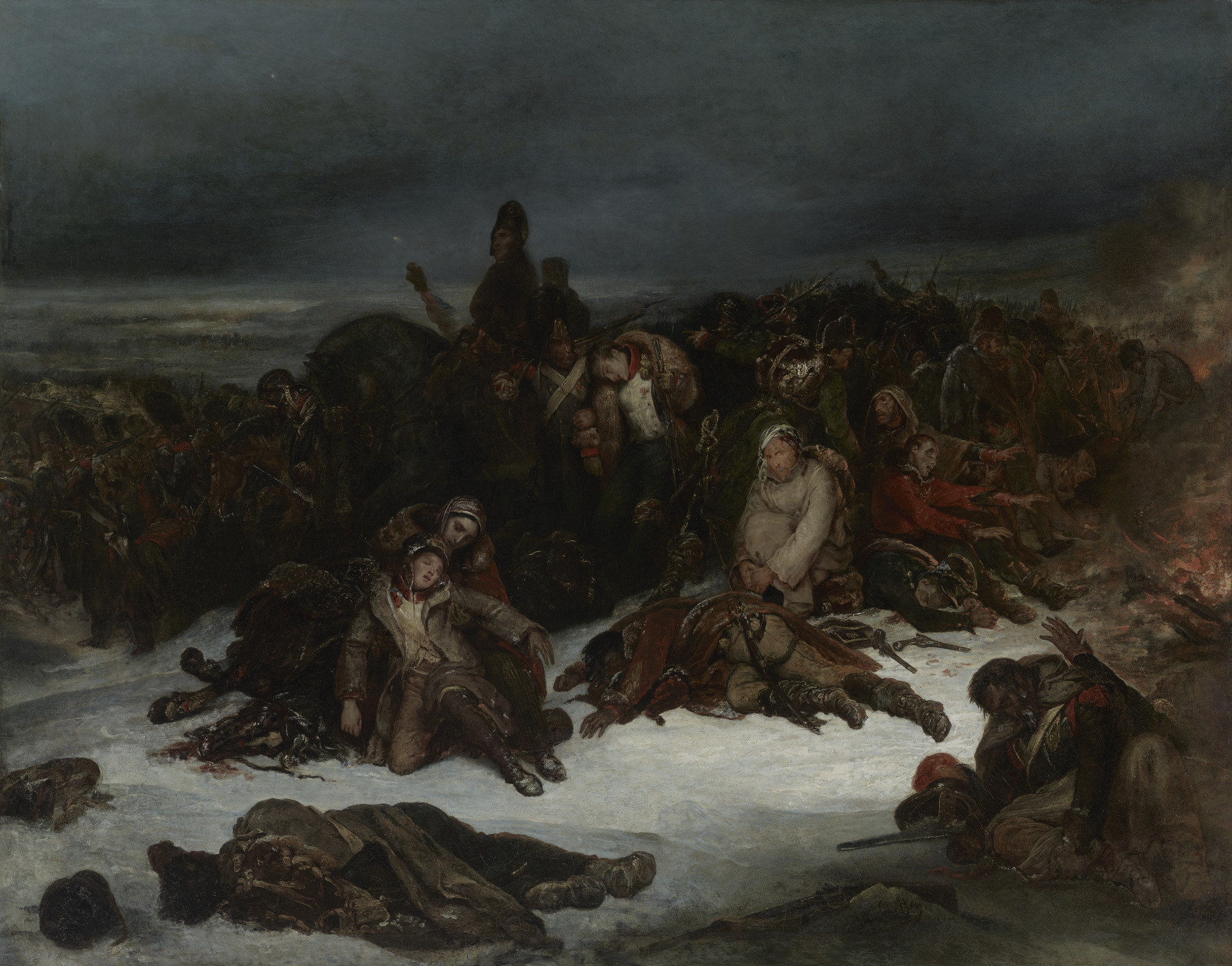
- Artist: Ary Scheffer
- Year: 1826
- Type: Oil on canvas, history painting
- Dimensions: 127.6 cm × 162.6 cm (50.2 in × 64.0 in)
- Location: Yale University Art Gallery; New Haven

The Retreat of Napoleon's Army from Russia in 1812 is an oil on canvas history painting by the Dutch artist Ary Scheffer, from 1826. It is held at the Yale University Art Gallery, in New Haven.

== History and description ==
The painting depicts a scene from the French invasion of Russia, during the Napoleonic Wars. After the occupation of Moscow, Napoleon's army undertook harrying retreat westwards. The painting does have a dark setting and mood, according to the tragic circumstances in which the retreat took place, with a large death toll. Several men dead or injured are visible. Scheffer was a Dordrecht-born painter who settled in Paris in 1810.

Scheffer was a close friend of the son of Marshal Michel Ney, which he depicts on horseback at the centre of the canvas, guiding the retreating troops towards safety. After being considered lost for more than a century and a half, the current painting was rediscovered in Paris in 1986. Today it is in the Yale University Art Gallery, in New Haven, Connecticut, having been acquired in 2011.

== Bibliography ==
- Hargrove, June Ellen. Liberty: The French-American Statue in Art and History. Perennial Library, 1986.
- Wright, Christopher. The World's Master Paintings: From the Early Renaissance to the Present Day. Routledge, 1992.
