= The Battle of Tolbiac (painting) =

Painting by Ary Scheffer

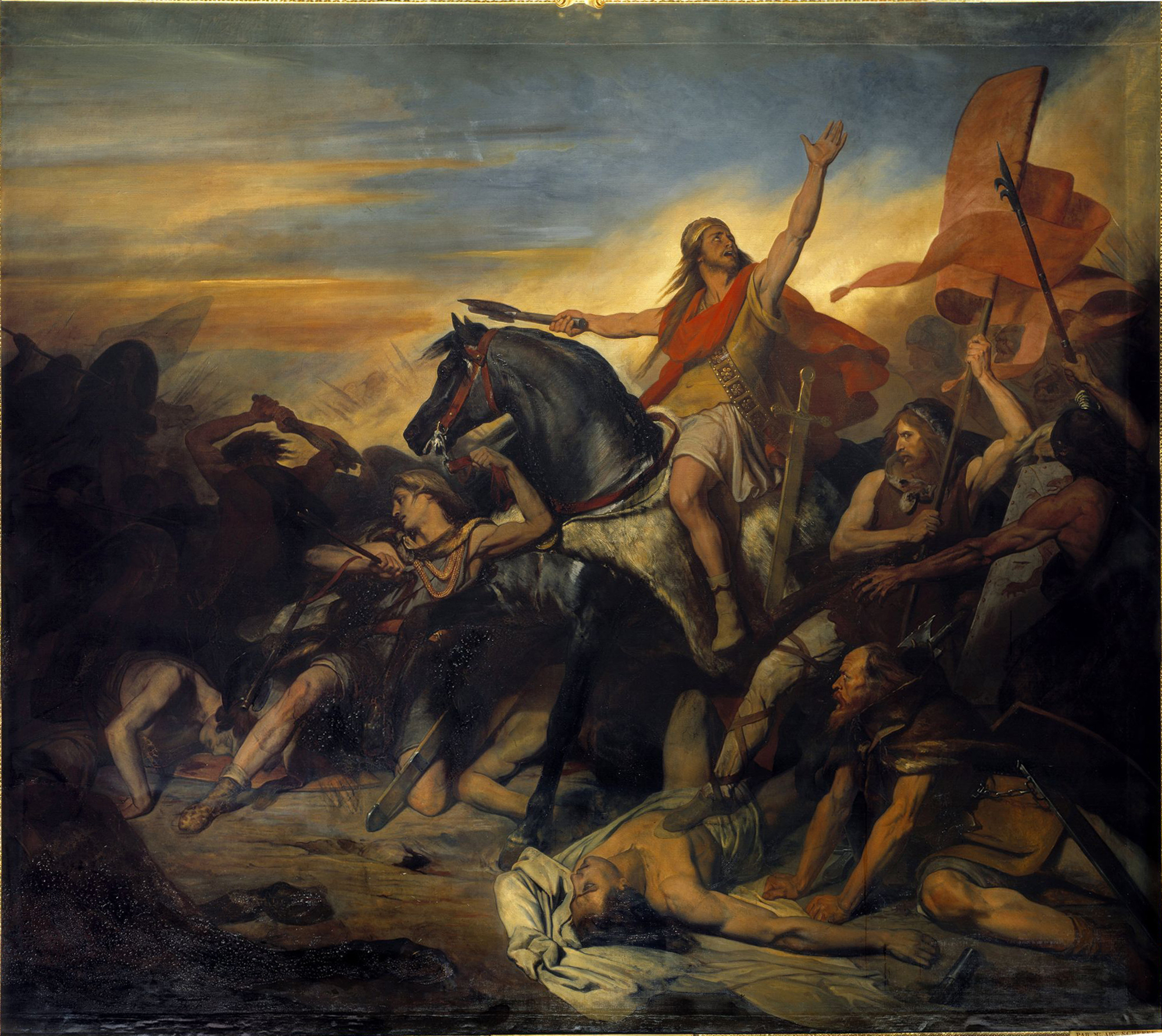
- Artist: Ary Scheffer
- Year: 1836
- Medium: Oil on canvas
- Dimensions: 415 cm × 465 cm (163 in × 183 in)
- Location: Palace of Versailles, Versailles

The Battle of Tolbiac (French: Bataille de Tolbiac 496) is an oil on canvas history painting by the Dutch-French artist Ary Scheffer, from 1836.

== History and description ==
It depicts the Battle of Tolbiac fought in 496 where the Franks, fighting under Clovis I, won a significant victory over the Germanic Alemanni. Scheffer chose to focus on the moment when Clovis rallies his tired, wavering troops by beseeching the aid of God. Afterwards, Clovis would convert to Christianity, believing he had found the true religion.

Scheffer was a noted Romantic artist who had made his career in France. The painting was commissioned by the July Monarchy of Louis Philippe I. It was exhibited at the Salon of 1837 at the Louvre in Paris and now hangs in the Galerie des Batailles at the Palace of Versailles.

Representing a foundational myth in French history, it is chronologically the first painting to hang in the gallery featuring French victories.

== Bibliography ==
- Boime, Albert. A Social History of Modern Art, Volume 3: Art in Age of Counterrevolution. University of Chicago Press, 2004.
- Hornstein, Katie. Picturing War in France, 1792–1856. Yale University Press, 2018.
