= Lamme (name) =

Lamme is a Dutch surname and given name. Notable people with this surname include:

== Surname ==
- Arie Lamme (1748–1801), Dutch landscape painter and poet
- Arie Johannes Lamme (1812–1900), Dutch painter, etcher, lithographer, art dealer and museum director
- Benjamin G. Lamme (1864–1924), American electrical engineer
- Bertha Lamme Feicht (1869–1943), American engineer
- Buck Lamme (1905–1957), American athlete and basketball coach
- Cornelia Lamme (1769–1839), Dutch painter
- Harry Lamme (1935–2019), Dutch water polo player
- Vernon Lamme (1892–1979), American archaeologist

== Given name ==
- Lamme Benenga (1886–1963), Dutch Olympic freestyle swimmer
- Lamme Heine (died 1630), witch
- William Hervy Lamme Wallace (1821–1862), American lawyer and general

== Fictional characters ==
- Lamme Goedzak, character in The Legend of Thyl Ulenspiegel and Lamme Goedzak
