= Dordrechts Museum =

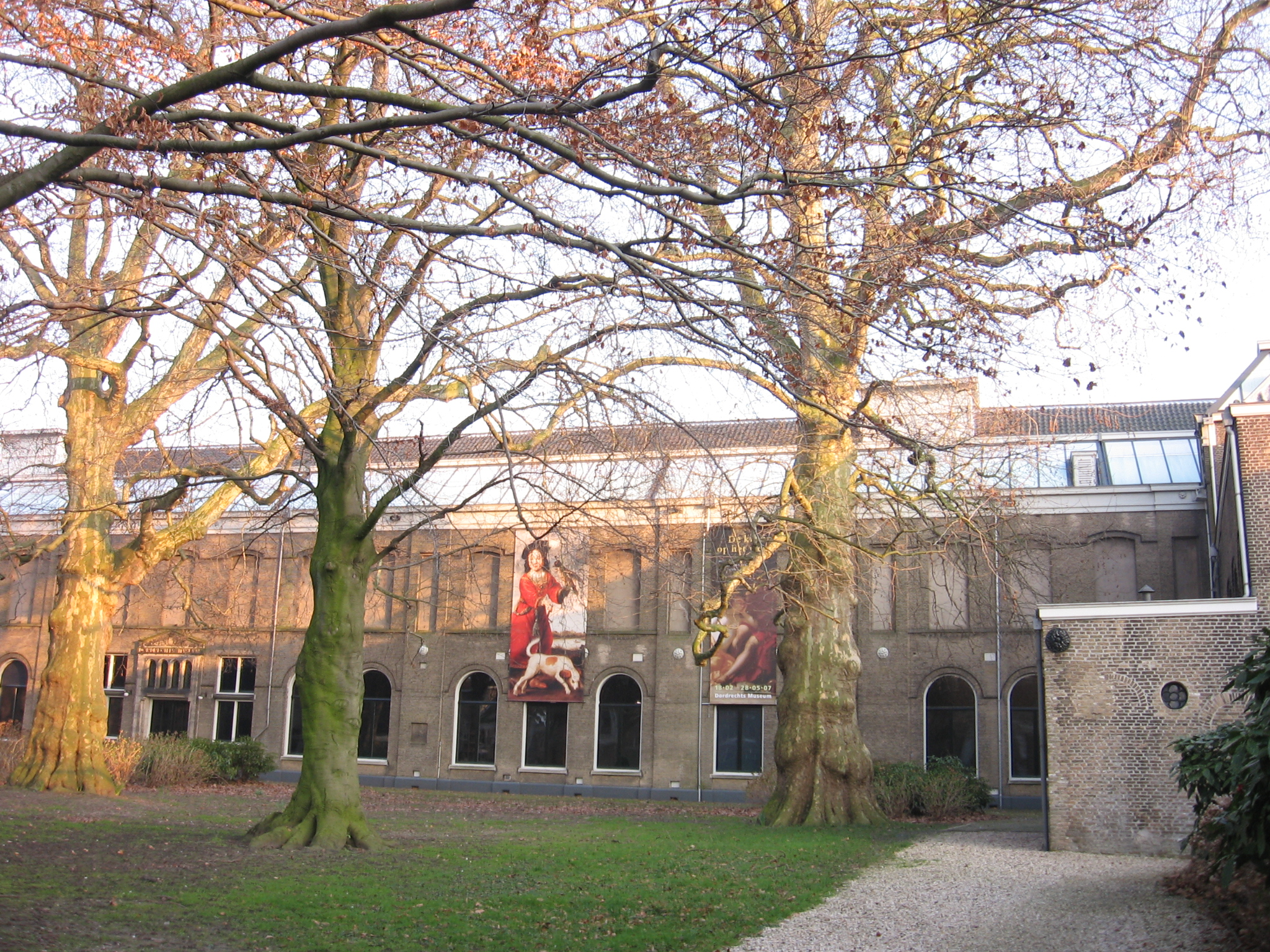
- The building of the Dordrechts Museum
- Established: 1842
- Location: Dordrecht, Netherlands
- Coordinates: 51.81388°N 4.67194°E
- Type: Art museum
- Visitors: c. 87.000 (2023)
- Director: Femke Hameetman
- Curators: Sander Paarlberg; Wilma Sütö
- Website: www.dordrechtsmuseum.nl

Dordrechts Museum is an art museum in Dordrecht, Netherlands. The museum was founded in 1842 and has a collection of artists of painting and other artistic objects from the last six centuries. The permanent collection includes numerous paintings from the Dutch Golden Age and the baroque period, as well as a sizeable collection of landscape art and 19th century paintings. The museum has an important collection of Dutch Masters in the Netherlands with art on display from Rembrandt, Jacob van Strij and the city's most famous painter Aelbert Cuyp.

== History ==
The museum was established in 1842 by a group of five art collectors from the Dordrecht area. It moved to its current location in 1904 taking over the converted building of a former asylum for the mentally ill. Initial work to make the building suitable was designed by Bernardus van Bilderbeek. It was not until the 1970s that there was further work on the museum - local architect and designer Water Nikkels oversaw the creation of two adjoining buildings. In 2006, architect Dirk Jan Postel (of Kraaivanger Architects) received the commission to add a new wing. It was completed by 2010 allowing for better display temporary exhibitions, as well as improved visitor facilities, including more toilets, a shop and restaurant (the 'Grand Cafe').

In 2015, the museum restituted to the heirs of Jacques Hederman a painting by Jacob Cuyp (1594 – 1652) which had been looted by the Nazis. The museum then repurchased the painting.

== Exhibitions ==
The museum shows regular exhibitions of Old Master, modern and contemporary art. One of its most noted exhibitions was In the Light of Cuyp: Aelbert Cuyp & Gainsborough – Constable – Turner, which explored the influencing of the Dordrecht landscape painters on British artists from the eighteenth and nineteenth centuries. The museum also hosts the Galatea Foundation's annual art prize to support migrants with artistic careers.

== Governance ==
Since 2022, the artistic director has been Femke Hameetman. She replaced Peter Schoon, who had been artistic director since 2002. There are around 120 staff, and a yearly budget of around 16 million Euros. In 2023, the museum received 87,067 visitors.

== Paintings ==
The museum has works of the following artists:

- Ferdinand Bol
- Adriaen Coorte
- Aelbert Cuyp
- Paul Gabriël
- Johan Barthold Jongkind
- Pyke Koch
- Philip Kouwen
- Piet Ouborg
- Ary Scheffer
- Aert Schouman
- Jan Sluijters
- Judith Ten Bosch
- Jan Toorop
- Adriaan van der Burg
- Jan van der Kooi
- Samuel van Hoogstraten
- Abraham van Strij
- Jacob van Strij
- JCJ Vanderheyden
- Jan Veth
- Adam Willaerts
- Robert Zandvliet

== Gallery ==
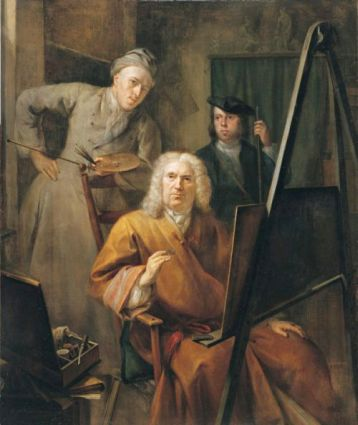
Portrait of Cornelis van Lill his grandson and the artist (1735) by Aert Schouman

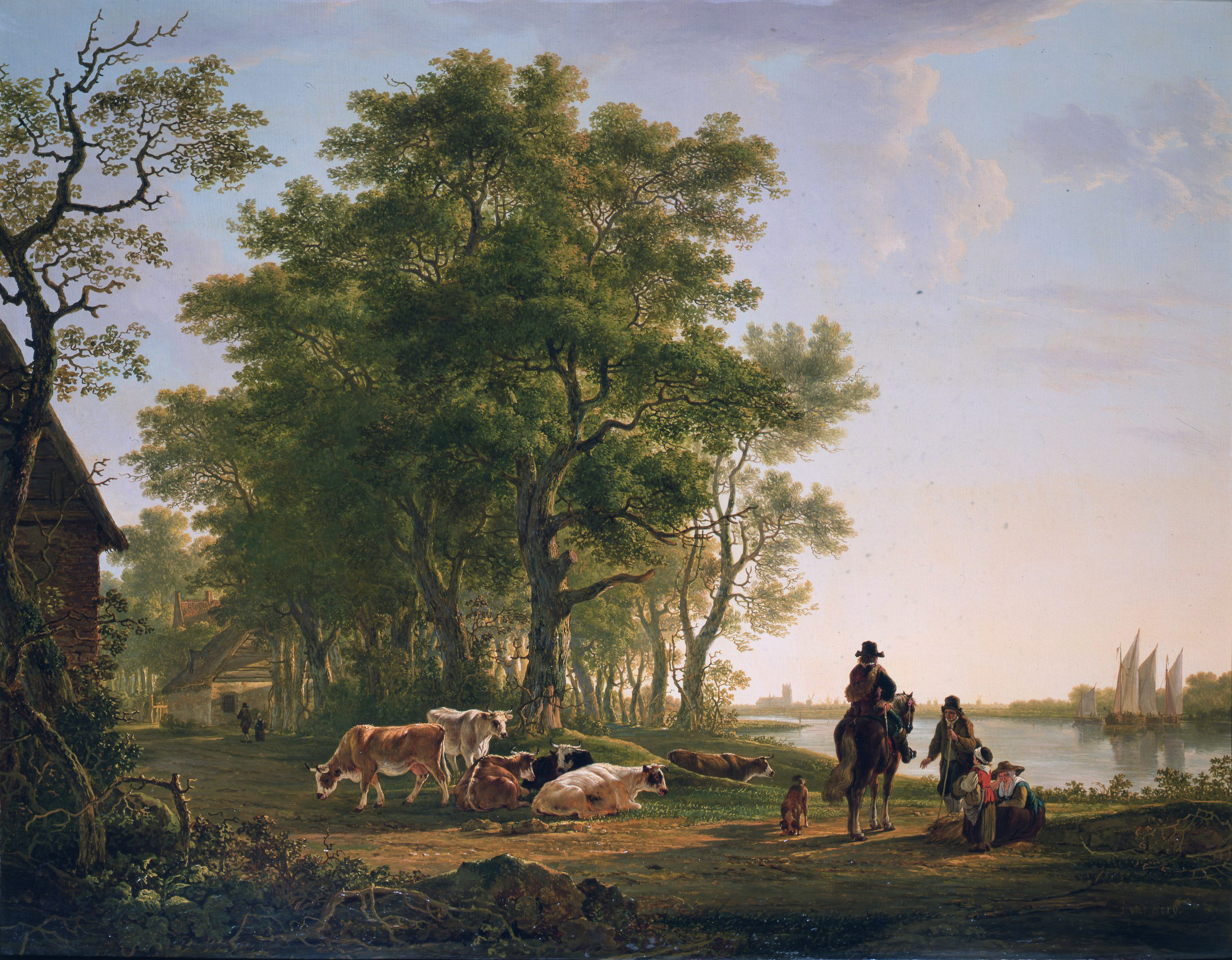
Scenery with trees and cattle near Dordrecht (c. 1800) by Jacob van Strij

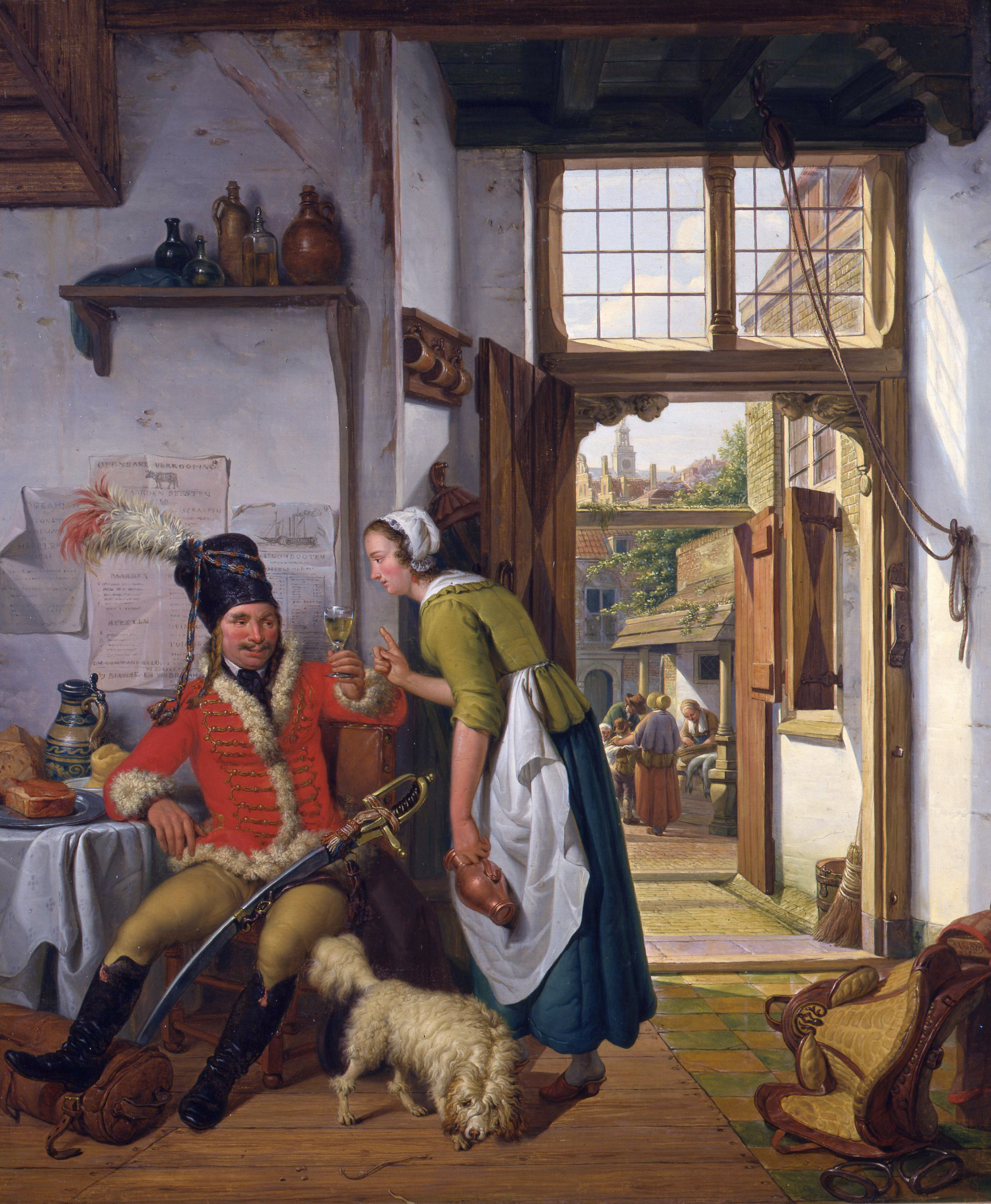
Interior of an Inn (1825) by Abraham van Strij

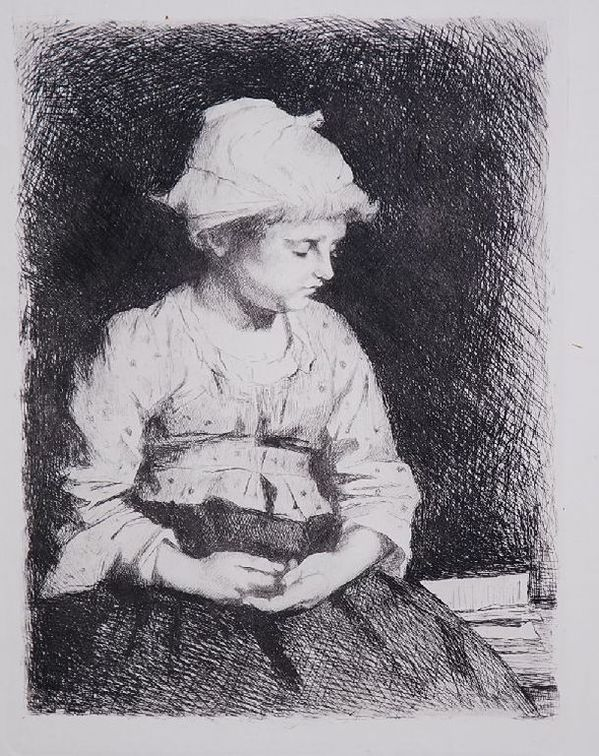
Schoolbijven (1886) by Thérèse Schwartze
