= Schouman =

Schouman is a Dutch surname. Notable people with the surname include:

- Aert Schouman (1710–1792), Dutch painter
- Derek Schouman (born 1985), American football tight end
- Martinus Schouman (1770–1848), Dutch painter
