= Kleyn =

Kleyn is surname literally meaning "little", an equivalent of German Klein. It can be Dutch or Yiddish origin. The Dutch ij digraph is often replaced with a "y", so it may be seen as a variant of Dutch Kleijn.

Notable people with the surname include:

- Antoinette Kleyn-Ockerse
- Jan Kleyn
- Jean Kleyn
- Matthijs Kleyn
