= Abraham Teerlink =

Dutch painter

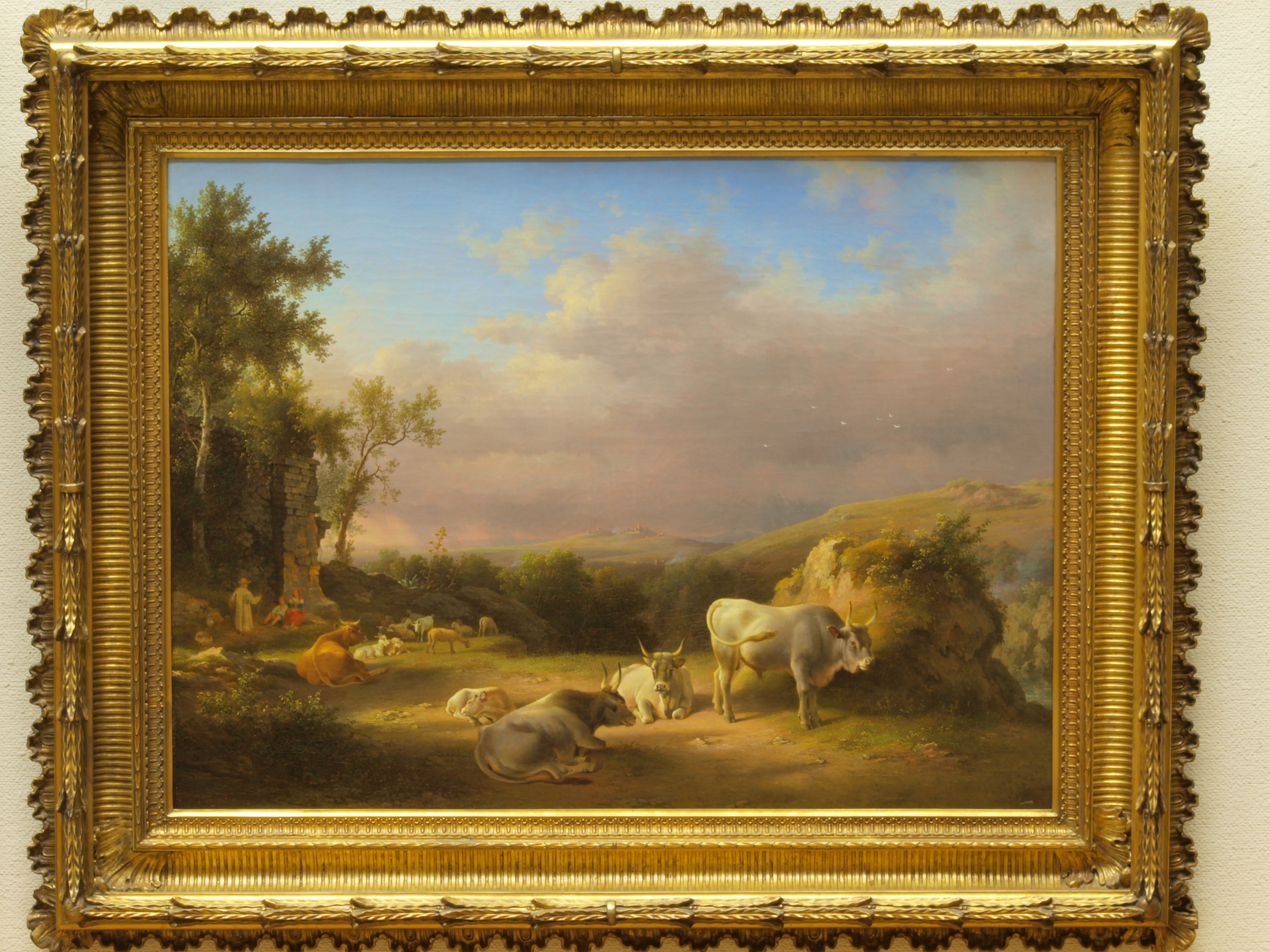
Landschap met vee (landscape with cattle) on display at the Teylers Museum.

Abraham Teerlink (Dordrecht, 5 November 1776 -- Rome, 26 May 1857 or July 1857) was a 19th-century painter and draughtsman from the Netherlands.

== Life and work ==
Abraham Teerlink jr. was the son in the middle-class family of Abraham Teerlink sr. and Johanna Smits. After showing an interest in the arts, he was tutored by Michiel Versteegh and later by J. Kelderman and Arie Lamme. He started with copying works of famous artists (under supervision of the mentioned tutors), but developed into a landscape painter, with his own compositions of landscapes often with cattle. In 1807 he received as one of three young painters in the Kingdom Holland a Prix de Rome, and hence received from King Louis Napoleon a stipend to travel to and study in Paris and Rome. He left for two years to Paris and Rome. In Paris he spent 1,5 year, copying and studying paintings from the Louvre and the Academy under supervision of the popular professor Jacques-Louis David, along with his compatriot from Dordrecht, Leendert de Koningh. He then travelled to Rome where he was able to find work in 1809, and remained there longer than planned. Once abroad he also spent time on poetry (in French).

In 1810 he settled definitively in Rome, though he continued to enter art competitions in the north. In 1836 he married the artist Anna Muschi and in 1839 he was awarded a knighthood in the Order of the Dutch Lion from King William I of the Netherlands. Teerlink never returned to the Netherlands, but did submit works for exhibitions in the Netherlands, which gained him wide recognition. In Rome he became a professor of fine arts. He was made an honorary member of the Koninklijke Academie voor beeldende kunsten te Amsterdam (Royal Academy of fine arts in Amsterdam) and of several Italian painter academies.

== Known works ==
- "Grot van Neptunus te Tivoli" (Cave of Neptune in Tivoli)
- "Gezicht van Camaldoli op de kusten van Bajae, en Miseno" (View of Camaldoli on the coasts of Bajae and Miseno), 1842
- "Landschap met vee" (landscape with cattle), located in the Teylers Museum
- "Rivierlandschap met vee bij opkomende zon" (River landscape with cattle at sunrise), located in Teylers Museum
- "Eene Magdalena", after Titian
