= Dijxhoorn =

Dijxhoorn may refer to:

- Adriaan Dijxhoorn (1889–1953), Dutch soldier and Minister of Defence
- Pieter Arnout Dijxhoorn (1810–1839), Dutch painter
