= Kleijn =

Kleijn is a Dutch surname meaning "small". The ij digraph is often replaced with a "y" ("Kleyn"). Notable people with the surname include:

- Arvid de Kleijn (born 1994), Dutch racing cyclist
- Eelke Kleijn (born 1983), Dutch producer and DJ
- Jetty Kleijn (born 1955), Dutch computer scientist
- Mike Kleijn (born 2005), Dutch footballer
- Pieter Rudolph Kleijn (1785–1816), Dutch landscape painter, son of Antoinette Kleijn-Ockerse
