= Pieter Arnout Dijxhoorn =

Dutch marine painter

Pieter Arnout Dijxhoorn (1810–1839), a Dutch marine painter, was born at Rotterdam in 1810. He was a scholar of Martinus Schouman and of J. C. Schotel, and painted marine subjects and river scenes in an able manner. He died at Rotterdam in 1839.
