= Frans Greenwood =

Dutch painter and glass engraver

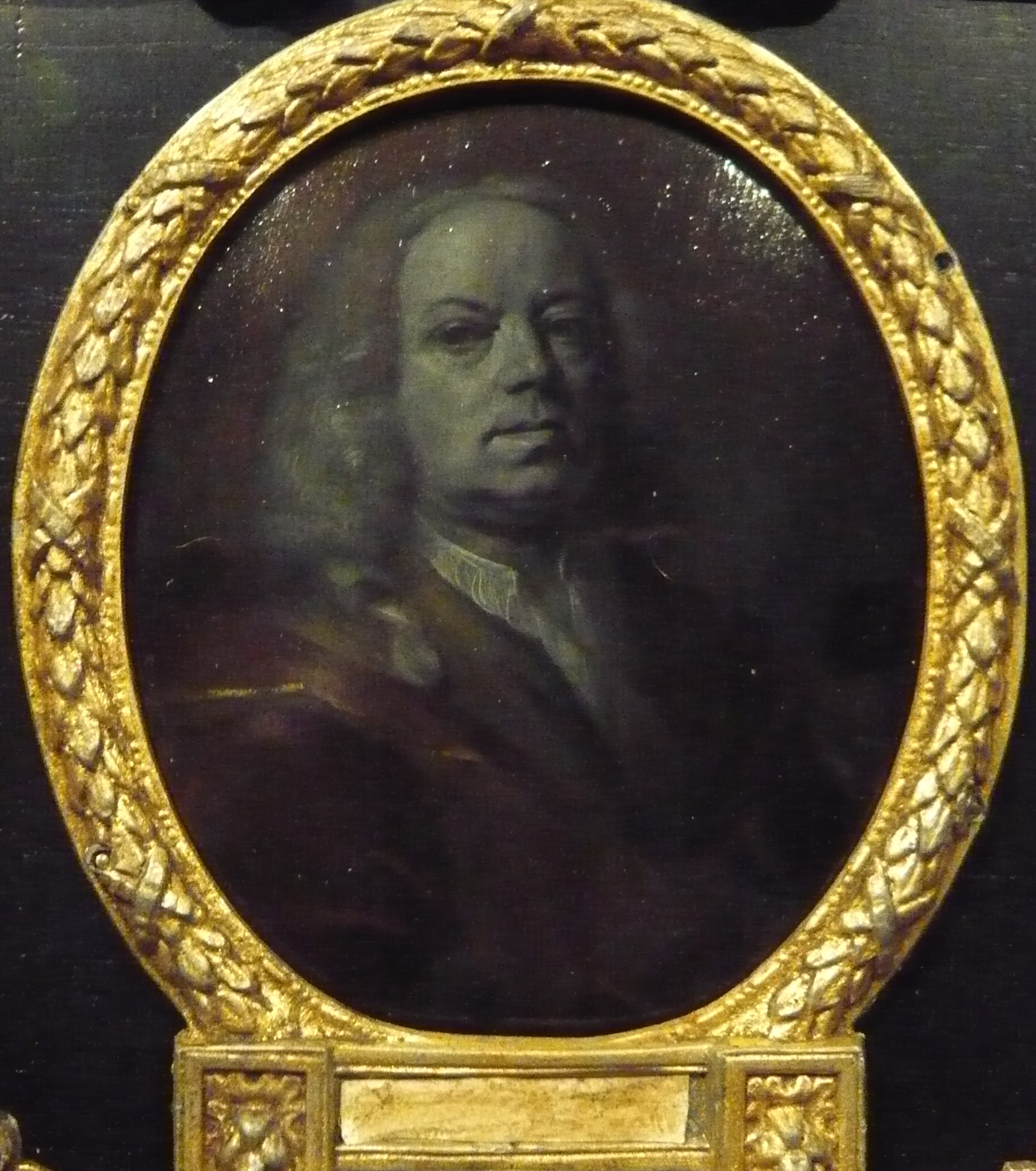
- Frans Greenwood, by Arnoud van Halen for his Panpoeticon Batavum
- Born: April 17, 1680; Rotterdam
- Died: October 29, 1763 (aged 83); Dordrecht

Frans Greenwood (April 17, 1680 – October 29, 1763) was a Dutch painter and glass engraver. Greenwood was born in Rotterdam as the son of a merchant from Yorkshire. He was first trained to be a merchant and became a tax collector in Dordrecht in 1726. Like the Amsterdam poet Vondel before him who was productive in his office in Amsterdam, Greenwood's new job seemed to help him become an artist, because during his working hours Greenwood had the opportunity to read and became a poet and calligrapher. He engraved his poetry on glass and invented the stipple engraving for glass. He specialized in creating moralistic pictures for glass loosely based on popular paintings and emblems of his day. Greenwood became an influence on other engravers in Dordrecht and his most important follower was Aert Schouman.
