= Gillis Smak Gregoor =

Dutch landscape painter

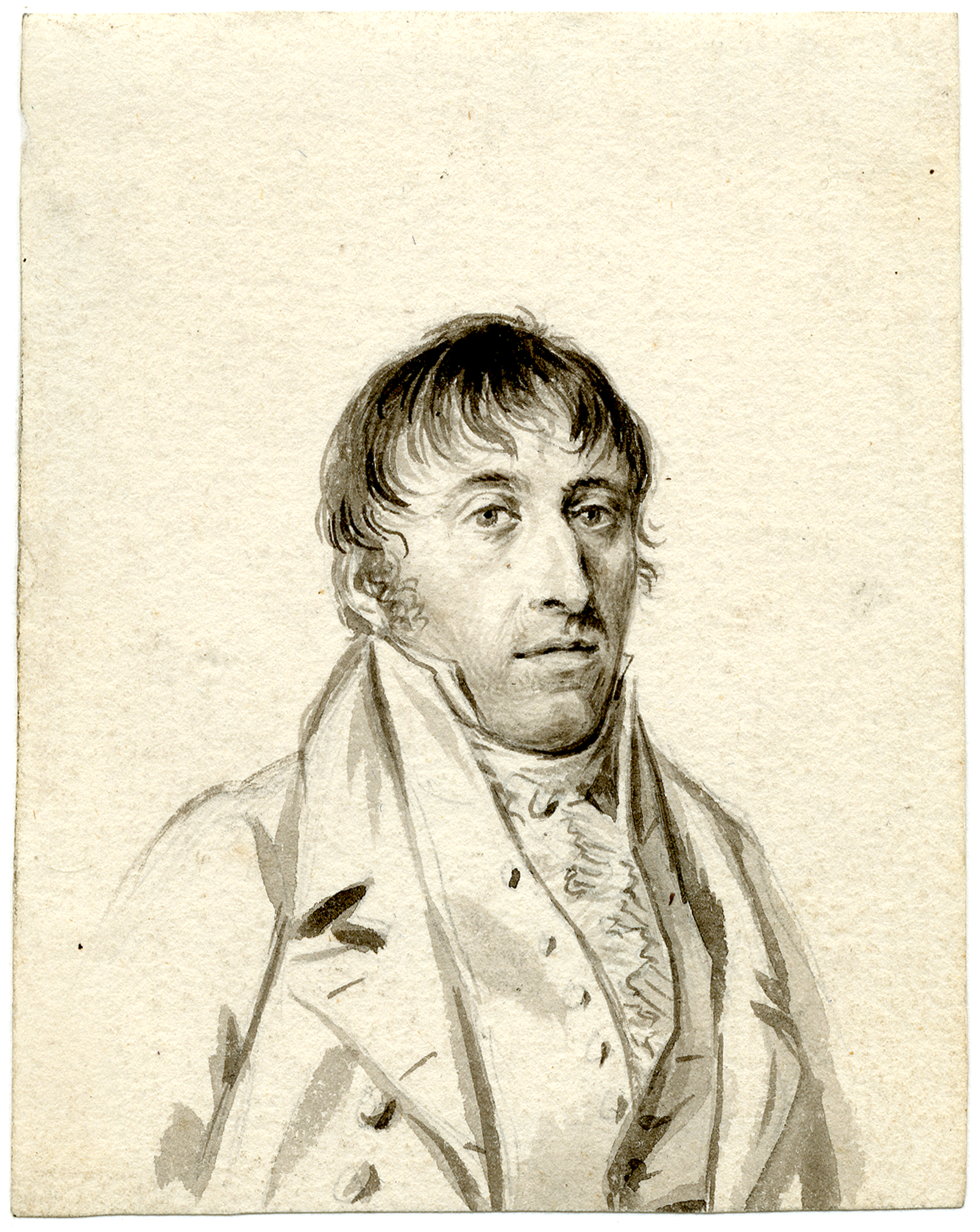
Gillis Smak Gregoor by H.W. Caspari

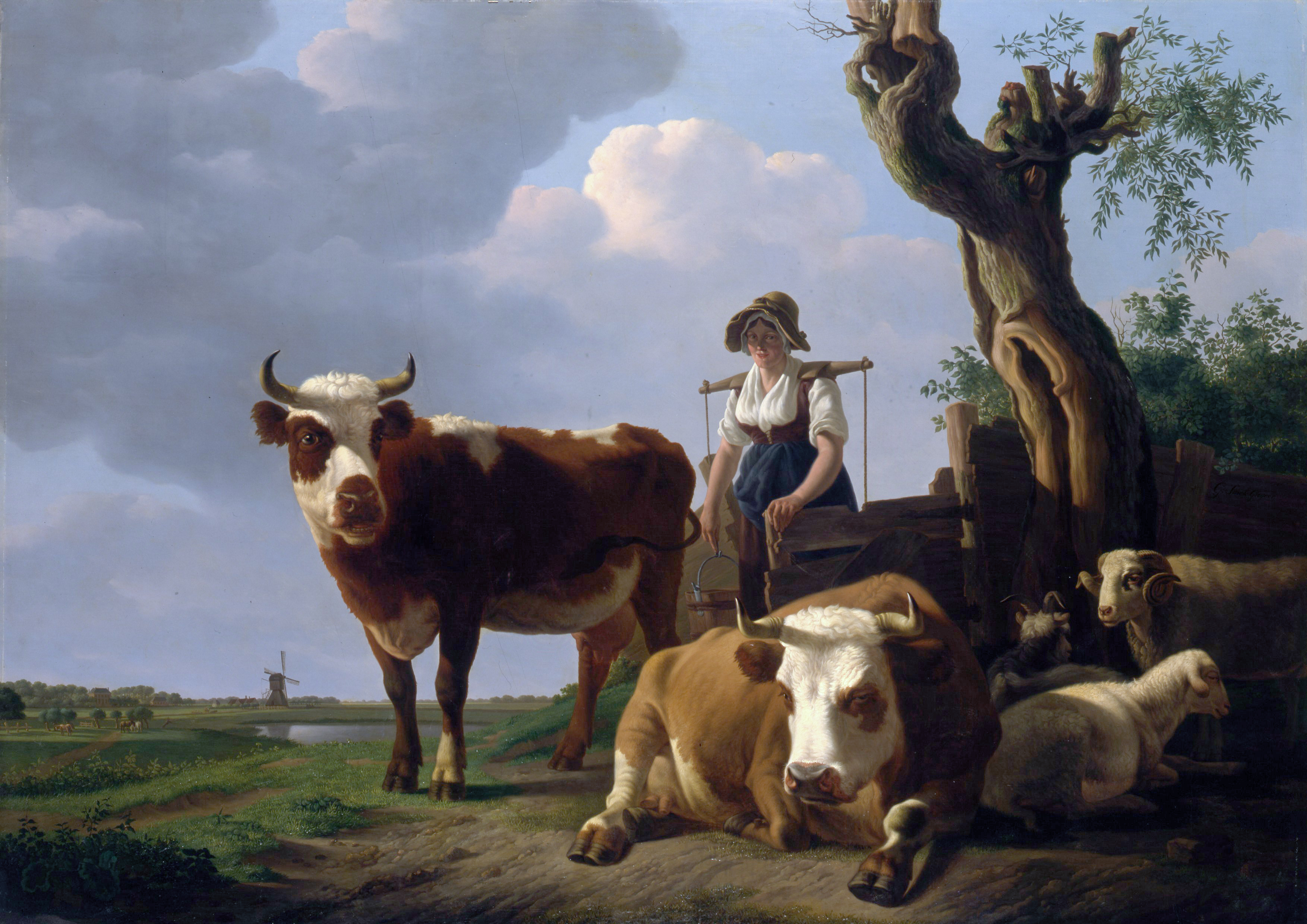
Landscape with cattle and country seat Weizigt in the distance

Gillis Smak Gregoor (1770 – 1843), was a Dutch landscape painter.

== Biography ==
He was born in Dordrecht, South Holland and was a pupil of Abraham and Jacob van Strij. He is known for landscapes with animals and was a member of the Pictura painter's collective in Dordrecht. His pupil was Matthijs Quispel. He died in Dordrecht.
