= Petrus Johannes Schotel =

Dutch painter (1808–1865)

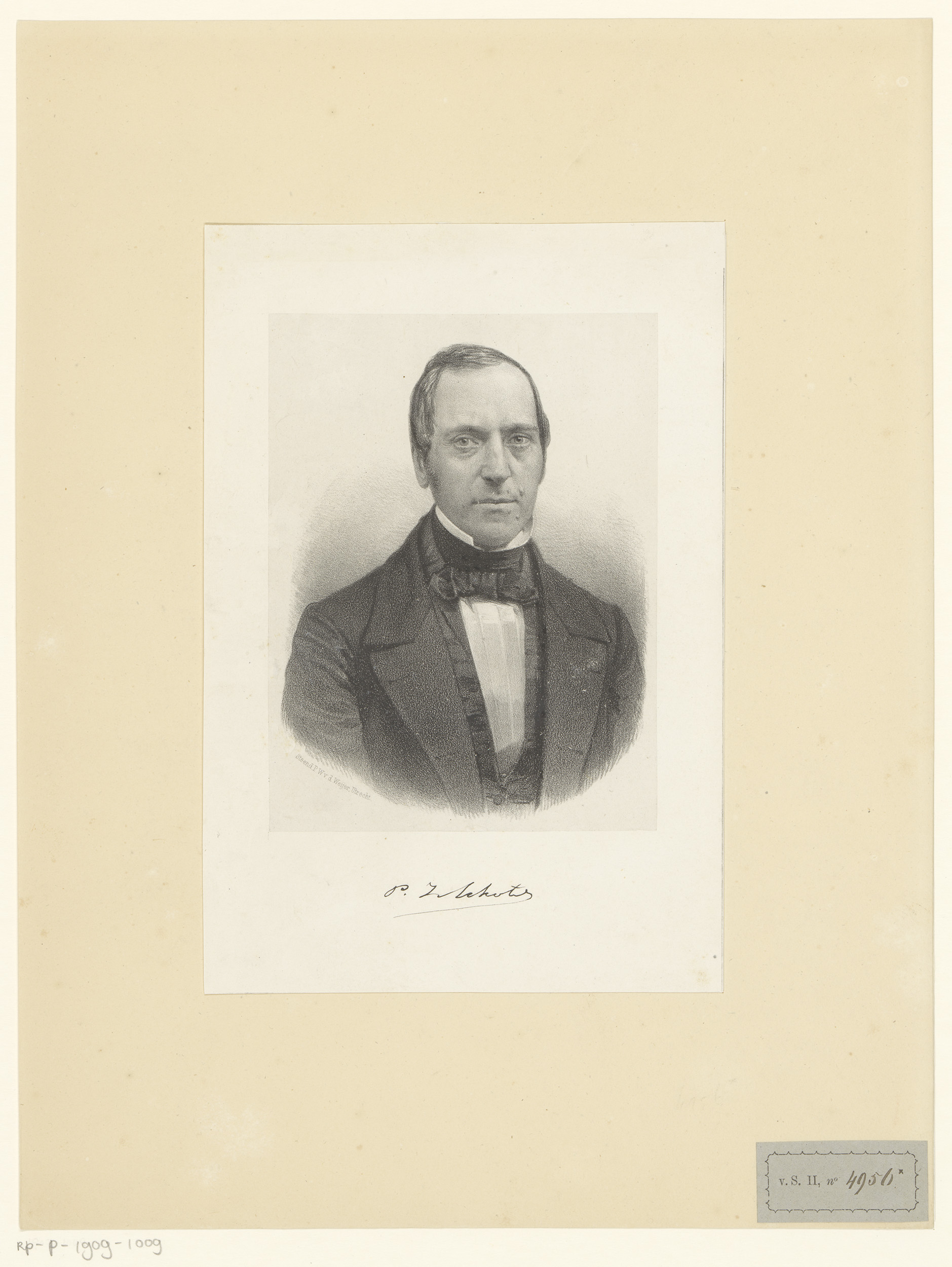
Portret van Petrus Johannes Schotel, RP-P-1909-1009

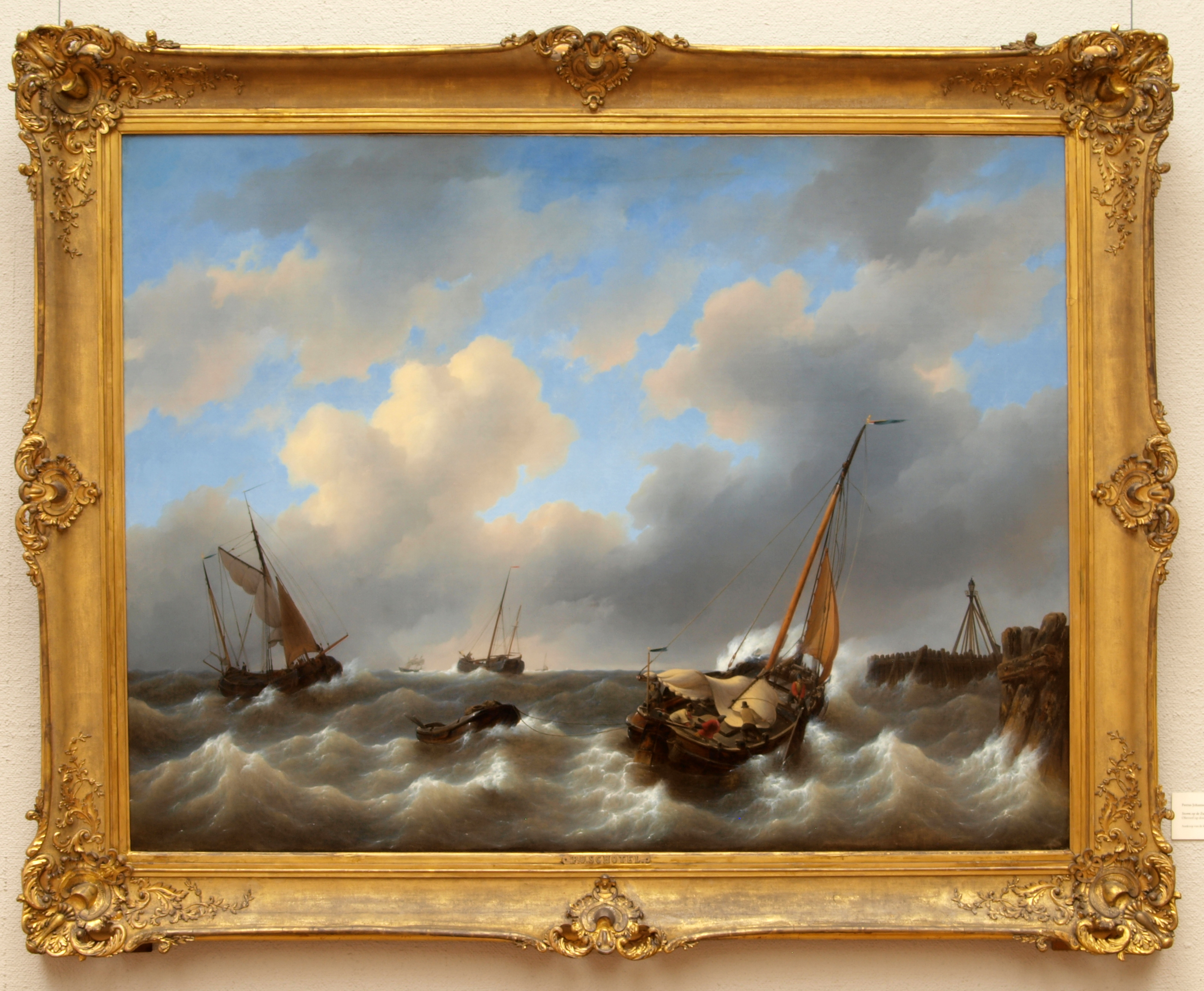
Storm on the Zuiderzee near Medemblik, 1840, collection Teylers Museum

Petrus Johannes Schotel (11 November 1808 – 23 July 1865) was a 19th-century marine painter from the Netherlands.

== Biography ==
Schotel was born in Dordrecht. According to the RKD he was the son of Johannes Christiaan Schotel, in whose style he followed. He worked for several years as a drawing teacher at the marine school in Medemblik. He married and his daughter Petronella Elisabeth Schotel became a painter who followed his sister Christina Petronella Schotel, a still life and flower painter. He died, aged 56, in Dresden, Germany.

The Schotel Family passed down their artistic talents throughout the generations. The smallest detail such as the signatures on artwork were formatted the same. Schotel signed his artwork with P.J Schotel as did his offspring.

Schotel had produced hundreds of various designs over his lifetime and to-date his work is being sold in auction houses internationally, specifically the Netherlands, Denmark and New York.
