= Cornelia Scheffer =

Dutch artist (1769–1839)

- Born: Cornelia Lamme; 23 April 1769; Dordrecht, Dutch Republic
- Died: 4 July 1839 (aged 70); Paris, France
- Known for: Painting
- Spouse: Johann Baptist Scheffer
- Children: Arij (Ary) Scheffer; Hendrik (Herni) Scheffer; Karel Arnoldus Scheffer

Cornelia Scheffer (née Lamme; 23 April 1769 – 4 July 1839) was a Dutch painter and portrait miniaturist. She was known as "a woman of much energy and strength of character." She also "was distinguished by her talents, her wit, and many good qualities, which rendered her one of the remarkable women of her time." She is often thought of as the most visually commemorated artist’s mother of all time.

== Biography ==
=== Early life ===
Born Cornelia Lamme, in Dordrecht, she was the daughter of Johanna van Es and the landscape painter Arie Lamme (1748–1801), by whom she was probably trained. She grew up with a younger brother, Arnoldus (1771–1856) in the artistic society of Dordrecht. As child she learnt French, German and English, played music and was well read. In 1787, when the Prussian army took over in order to save the rule of William V, stadtholder of the Dutch Republic, the family was forced to flee to southern Netherlands due to her father’s patriotic views. They lived there in exile for two years before returning to Dordrecht in 1789.

=== Family ===
She married the painter Johann Baptist Scheffer, of Homburg in Hessen-Kassel, in Dordrecht (26 October 1794) with whom she had 6 children, only 3 of which reached adulthood. The eldest, Ary (born Arij) Scheffer, named after her father, (1795–1858) became a famous romantic painter. The middle son, Karel Arnoldus Scheffer (1796-1853), named after her brother, became a journalist and writer, while the youngest, Hendrink (nickname: Henri) Scheffer (1798–1862), became a painter as well. The family moved to Den Haag in 1798, then Rotterdam in 1801, and finally Amsterdam in 1803. Just as her husband, Johann, was contracted as the chief painter for King Louis Napoléon Bonaparte (known as Louis I, Lodewijk I in Dutch), brother of emperor Napoleon Bonaparte I, he died at age 45. Soon after his passing, poet Willem Bilderdijk wrote a poem about her and her son Ary, in which he predicted Ary’s successful career as a painter. After her husband’s death, she faced financial difficulties and received support from her brother, who came to live with the family. She sent Ary to Lille in the north of France to continue his artistic education and potentially find work. In this time she wrote him extensively with admonition and advice. When she found herself unable to find work through King Louis I, she decided to move to Paris with Ary in 1811. One year later she asked her other two sons to join her there. She is not known to have made any original pieces after 1811. It is unknown if she attended exhibitions where her work was on display. During her time in Paris there was an exhibition in Dordrecht in 1819, and in Den Haag in 1825.

=== Paris ===
From letters between her and her brother, Arnoldus, her first few years in the district of Saint-Germain were lived in poorer circumstances. She decided to remain in Paris as she had a firm belief that an artist had better chances of finding work there than back in the Netherlands. It is speculated that Ary and Hendrik were trained as painters at the studio of Prud’hon before studying under Pierre-Narcisse Guérin. Ary’s work became very popular, partly due to the recognition he received from the French royal family, and became a well known portrait artist. In 1821, Cornelia began to work for him and Henri as a copyist, likely to keep a personal collection of his work. In this period she also began modelling for her sons. In 1830, following an increase in demand for Ary’s work, he decided to move to a villa on Rue Chaptal in Nouvelle Athène, which was an arts district near Montmartre. Cornelia decided to move in with him soon after. Having lived with her son Ary for the majority of her life, and given his newfound status, it is assumed that she met with many of his famous visitors, including artists Eugene Delacroix, Theodore Gericault, and Jean Baptiste-Dominique Ingres as well as writer, George Sand. It is also known that musicians including Frederic Chopin and Franz Liszt came by the villa to play while Ary painted. She may (or may not) have personally known Édouard Manet. In 1845, she modelled for her son Ary's painting Saints Augustine and Monica. (However, the version on display at the National Gallery in London was done in 1854 with a different model, Mrs. Robert Holland.)

=== Late life and death ===
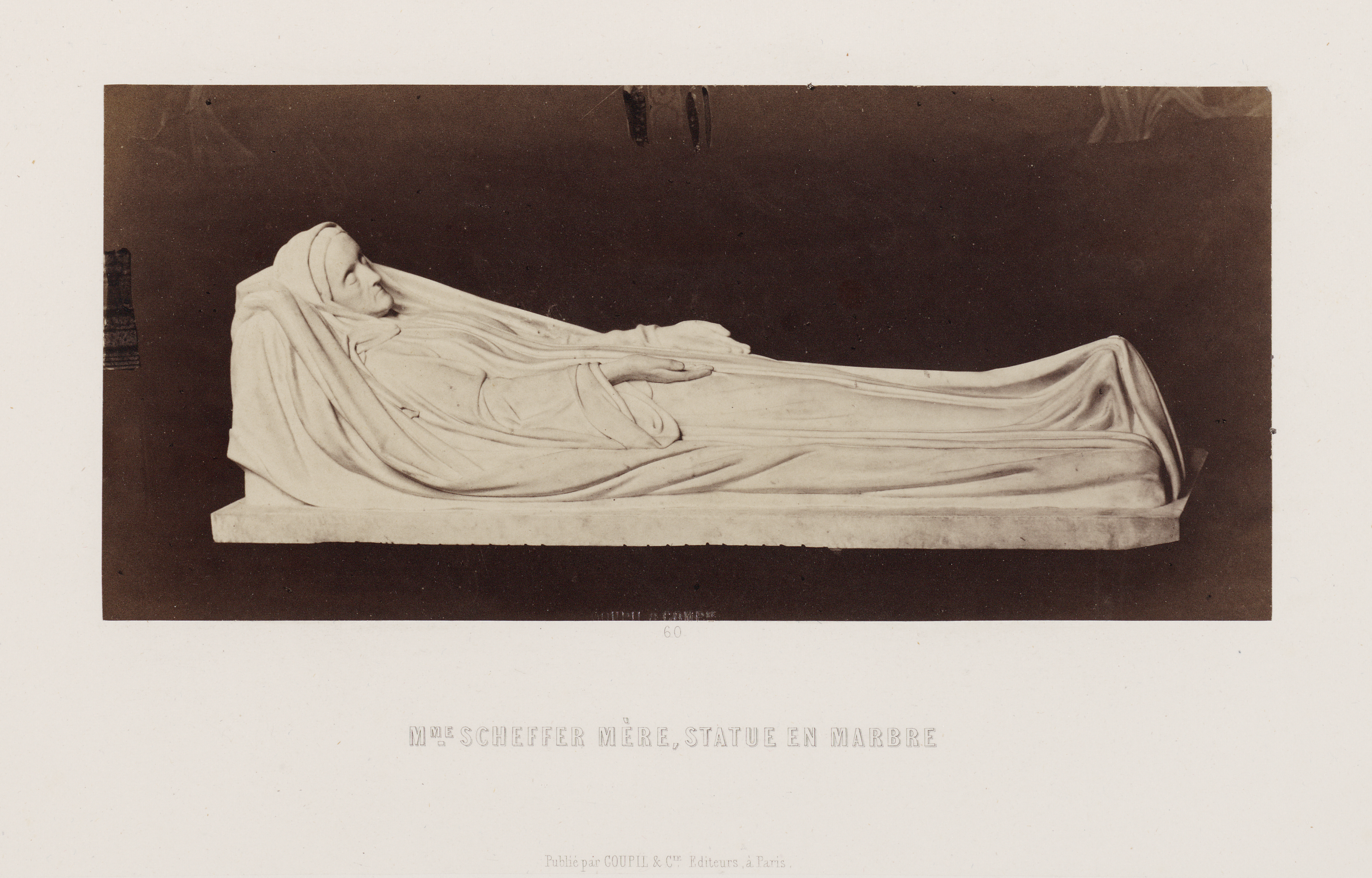
Sculpture of Cornelia Scheffer on her deathbed

Throughout her later life with Ary, her other two sons lived either with them or nearby. Her nieces and nephews, including art dealer and first director of the Boijmans museum, Arie Johannes Lamme, often came to visit. She was unaware of her namesake granddaughter, Ary’s daughter (unknown mother), until she came to live with them in the villa in 1837. She died in Paris in 1839, aged 70. She was buried in a plot at the Montmartre Cemetery, together with a life-sized cast of her on her deathbed, made by Ary. Her sons grieved the loss of their mother greatly, with Ary creating 20 ‘post mortem’ pieces for her, including one of her on her deathbed and a marble gravestone. They were both kept in his atelier along with a cast of her hands for his entire life.

== Works ==
Most of Cornelia’s work consists of portraits of family and the elite by which she was contracted. She adopted multiple artistic media including watercolour, chalk and oil paints. According to various biographies, she was said to have made numerous etchings as well, however, none survive to this day. In addition to the miniatures for which she is well known, she also made larger portraits and copies of older masters up to one meter in height.

In 1810, there was an exhibition in Amsterdam called Exposition of Living Masters in which some of her works were displayed, including two of her miniature portraits. She currently has 70 pieces of her work displayed in public collections in the Dordrecht Museum, Amsterdam Museum, Museum Boijmand van Beuningen in Rotterdam and the Rijksmuseum in Amsterdam.

== Additional sources ==
- Thieme-Becker, Allgemeines Lexikon der Bildenden Künstler von der Antike bis zur Gegenwart, vol. 30, Leipzig, 1936, p. 5
- Dictionary of artists / Benezit, vol. 12, Paris, 2006, p. 565
- Willem Bilderdijk, Aan de weduwe des kunstschilders Scheffer, in hare droefheid (z.p. 1809).
- Staring, ‘Het portretminiatuur in Nederland’, Oude Kunst 4 (1918-1919) 199-206, 225-232.
- Museum Ary Scheffer. Catalogus der kunstwerken en andere voorwerpen, betrekking hebbende op Ary Scheffer en toebehoorende aan Dordrechts Museum (Dordrecht 1934) 46, 58-59, 66-69.
- Titia J. Geest, ‘Arie Lamme en zijn nageslacht’, in: Idem, Vier historische opstellen (Assen 1959) 13-34.
- Ary Scheffer 1795-1858. Dessins, aquarelles, esquisses à l’huile. Tentoonstellingscatalogus Institut Néerlandais, Parijs (Parijs 1980).
- Anne-Marie de Brem, L’atelier d’Ary Scheffer. Tentoonstellingscatalogus Musée de la Vie Romantique, Parijs (Parijs 1991).
- Leo Ewals, Ary Scheffer 1795-1858. Gevierd romanticus. Tentoonstellingscatalogus Dordrechts Museum (Zwolle 1995).
- B.C. Sliggers red., Naar het lijk. Het Nederlandse doodsportret 1500-heden. Tentoonstellingscatalogus Teylers Museum, Haarlem (Zutphen 1998).
- Yvette Marcus-de Groot. ‘Cornelia Scheffer-Lamme (1769-1839). Kunstenares en moeder’. Bulletin Dordrechts Museum 31 (2006) 3. 11.
