= Johan Bernard Scheffer =

Dutch painter

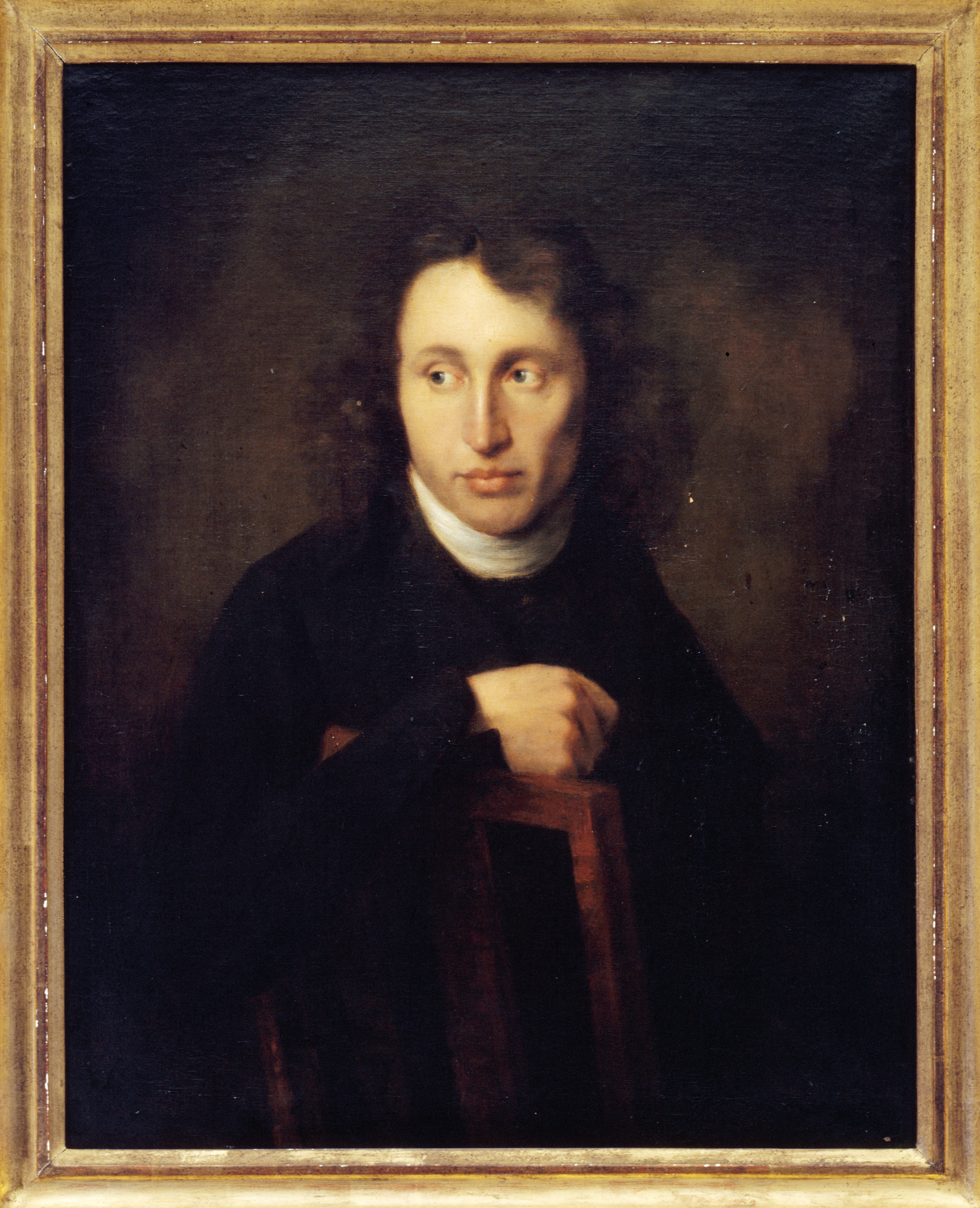
Self-portrait c. 1808

Johann or Johan Bernard Scheffer (also Jean Baptist Scheffer; 1764 – 30 June 1809) was a German-born painter and etcher active in the Netherlands and the father of the painter Ary Scheffer.

He was born in Homberg, Hesse-Kassel. He was the son of Johann Werner Scheffer (1730–1799) and Catharine Maria Pfluger (1731–1799) and a pupil of Johann Friedrich August Tischbein. By 1788 he lived and worked in Utrecht and from 1790 in Dordrecht where in October 1794 he married the miniature painter Cornelia Lamme (1769–1839), daughter of the landscape painter Arie Lamme. They had three sons who survived to adulthood: the portrait painter Ary Scheffer (1795–1858), the journalist and writer Karel Arnold Scheffer (1796–1853) and the painter Hendrik Scheffer (1798–1862). The family moved in 1798 from Dordrecht to The Hague, in 1801 to Rotterdam and in 1803 to Amsterdam. Scheffer produced several large historical works, and some portraits, including one of King Louis Bonaparte of Holland. In 1808 he became court painter of Louis Bonaparte in Amsterdam, where he died only a year later at the age of 44 or 45. He was buried 5 July 1809 in the Zuiderkerk.
