= Jacobus Bellamy =

Dutch poet

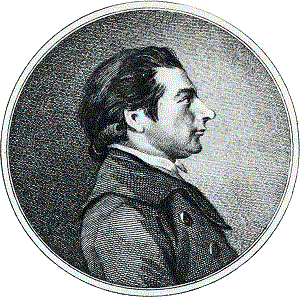
Jacobus Bellamy.

Jacob (Jacobus) Bellamy (November 12, 1757 in Vlissingen, Dutch Republic – March 11, 1786 in Utrecht) was a Dutch poet.

== Biographical notes ==
Jacobus Bellamy was the son of Jacques Bellami jr. and Sara Hoefnagel. His father died when he was 4. His Swiss-born (Vevey) grandfather then moved in with the family. From the age of 12, Jacobus started working as a bakers help. At this young age Jacobus already developed a profound liking of poetry, in which he found consolation. Prominent Dutch poets of the time, like Joannes Antonides and Hubert Kornelisz. Poot, were exemplary to him. A vicar recommended him to a local lyrical society, and later supported his application as a student of the clergy. As a student he became member of a poetical circle in The Hague. As a member he developed a theory in which looseness, truth and nature are essential conditions in any work of art. His own poetry became Anacreontics in form. In Vlissingen he fell in love with Francina/Fransje (or Fillis) Baane. However, she engaged herself to another man in 1779, who died a year later. Jacobus then secretly engaged Francina. When Francines mother found out about their affair, she forbade it. In later years the couple would only meet in secret in the house of a mutual friend. Only when Bellamy became published and recognised as a poet, Francine's mother acknowledged the bond between her daughter and Bellamy. Towards the end of 1781, after some private tutoring by the dean, he was admitted as a student at Utrecht University. Several residents of his hometown provided financial support. He rented a room in de Lange Nieuwstraat in Utrecht. In 1782 he published his first book of poetry, "Gezangen van mijn jeugd" (Songs of my youth). He died in 1786, and was buried in the Nicolaikerk in Utrecht.

== On his poetry ==
Before his first book of poems, in 1781 a poem was published in a patriotic weekly called De Post van den Neder-Rhijn, under a patriotic pen name Zelandus (derived from the province where he was born, Zeeland). Influenced by a popular poet, he developed a style of poetry that could be understood by common people, which also expressed his feelings of patriotism and independence. With the publisher Jan Martinus van Vloten he published nine poems between 1782 and 1783 in De Post van den Neder-Rhijn. Together they were published in his second book. In 1784 Bellamy became editor of a literary magazine called Proeven voor het verstand, den smaak en het hart, originally started by his friend reverend Willem Ockerse. In the second edition he published a well known poem called "Roosje" (Little Rose). In this period he left the poetical group in the Hague, and joined a similar circle in Utrecht. He also started a magazine of his own, De Poëtische Spectator, in which he criticized his old poetical society. His last book was published in 1785, in which he called his poems "odes", after an example set by another poet Antoinette Ockerse.

== Publications ==
(all in Dutch)

- Gezangen mijner jeugd (1782)
- Vaderlandsche gezangen van Zelandus (1782-1783)
- Proeven voor het verstand, den smaak en het hart (1784-1785)
- De poëtische spectator (1784-1786)
- Gezangen of Oden (1785)
- Gedichten (1838)
