= Abraham van Strij =

Dutch painter

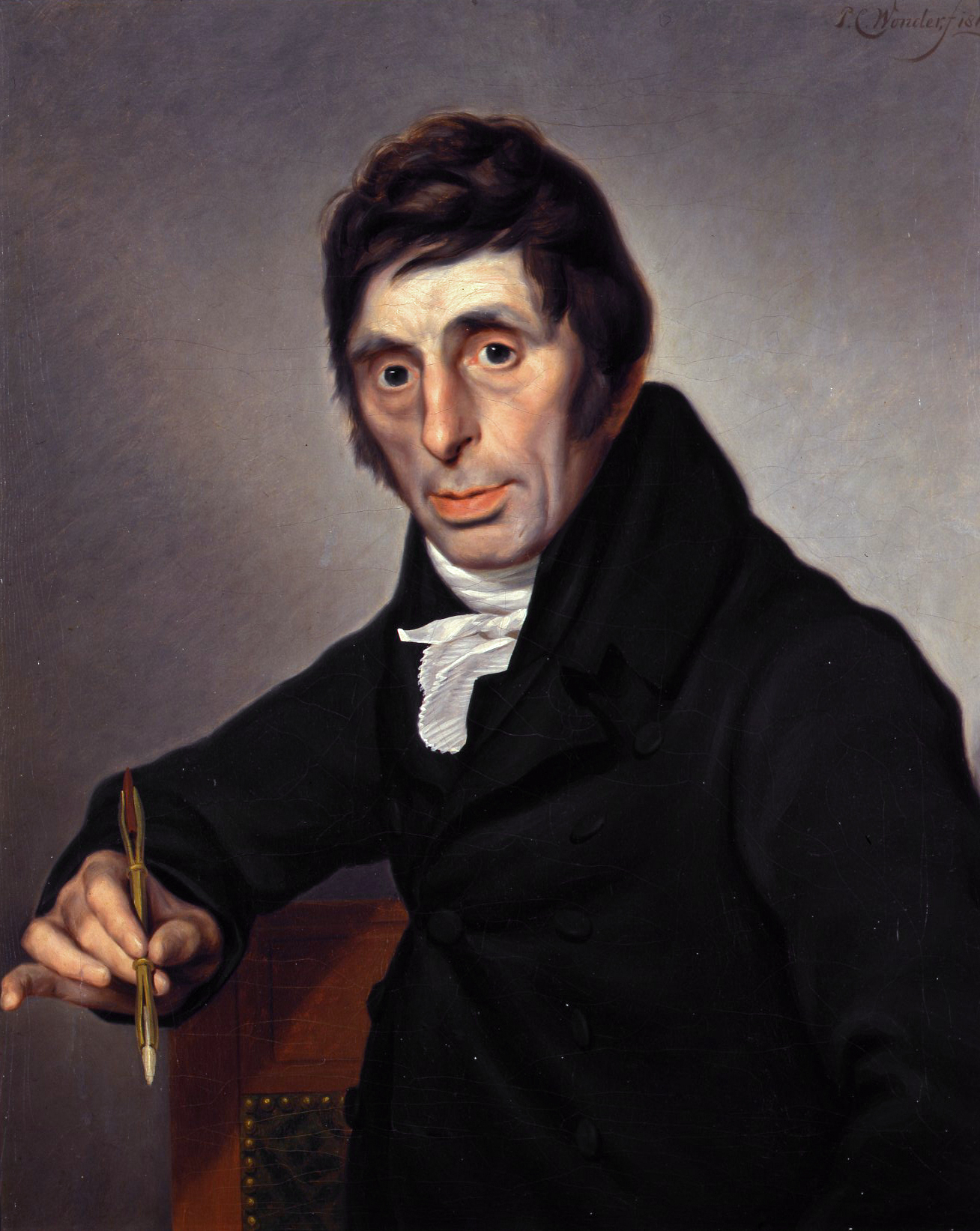
Abraham van Strij painted by Pieter Christoffel Wonder, 1812

Abraham van Strij (1753–1826) was an 18th-century painter from the Netherlands.

== Biography ==
Van Strij was born and died in Dordrecht. According to the RKD he was the son of Leendert and the brother of Jacob. Both he and his brother were pupils of his father, and after taking lessons from Joris Ponse, Abraham joined his father's workshop. He was a member of the Dordrecht Guild of St. Luke and later its director. His son Abraham II also became a painter, and besides his son, he and his brother took on pupils after taking over their father's workshop. Their pupils were Pieter Rudolph Kleijn, Johannes van Lexmond, Jacob de Meijer, Johannes Rutten, Johannes Schoenmakers, Johannes Christiaan Schotel, and Gillis Smak Gregoor.

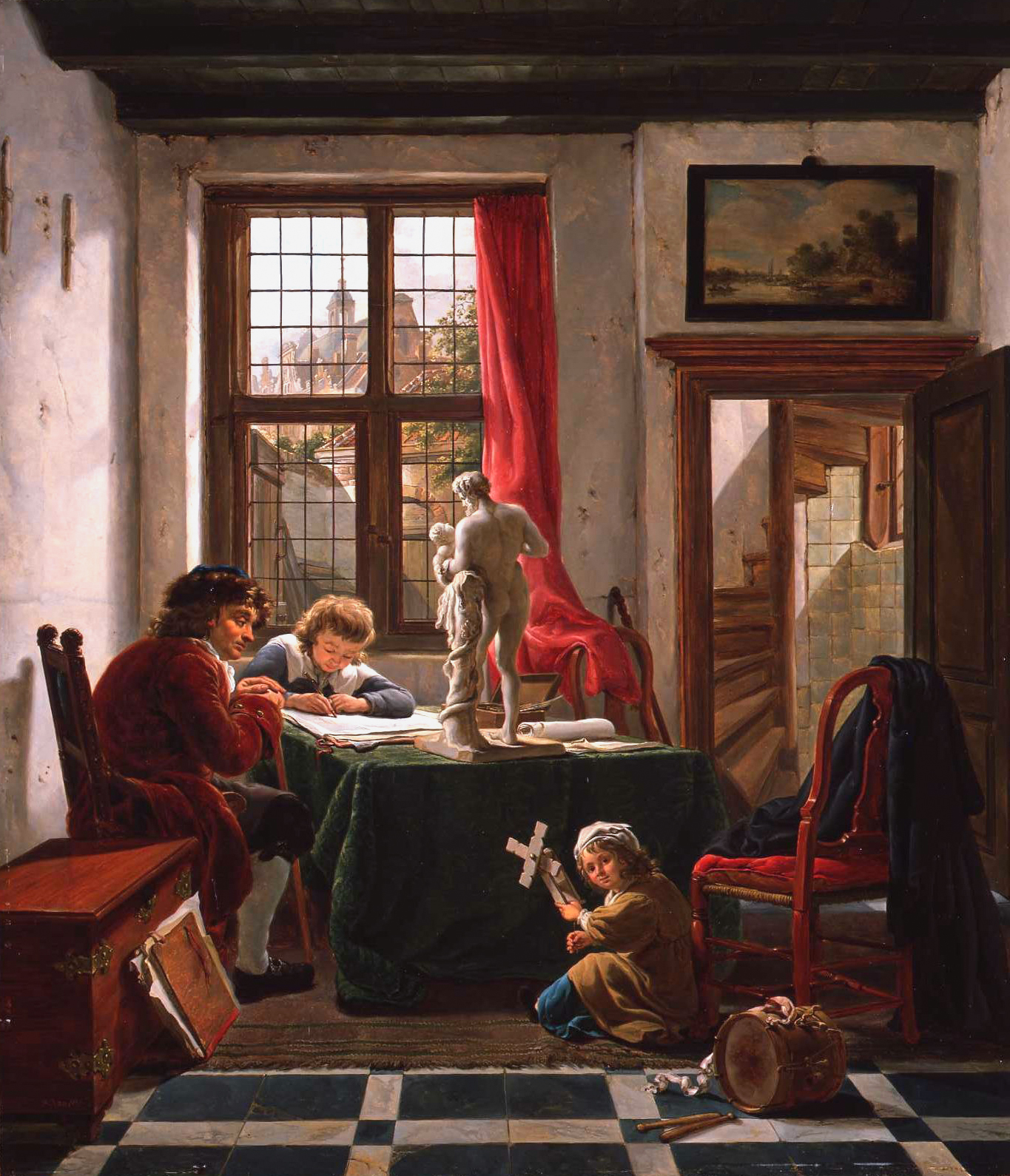
Abraham van Strij: The drawing lesson, around 1800

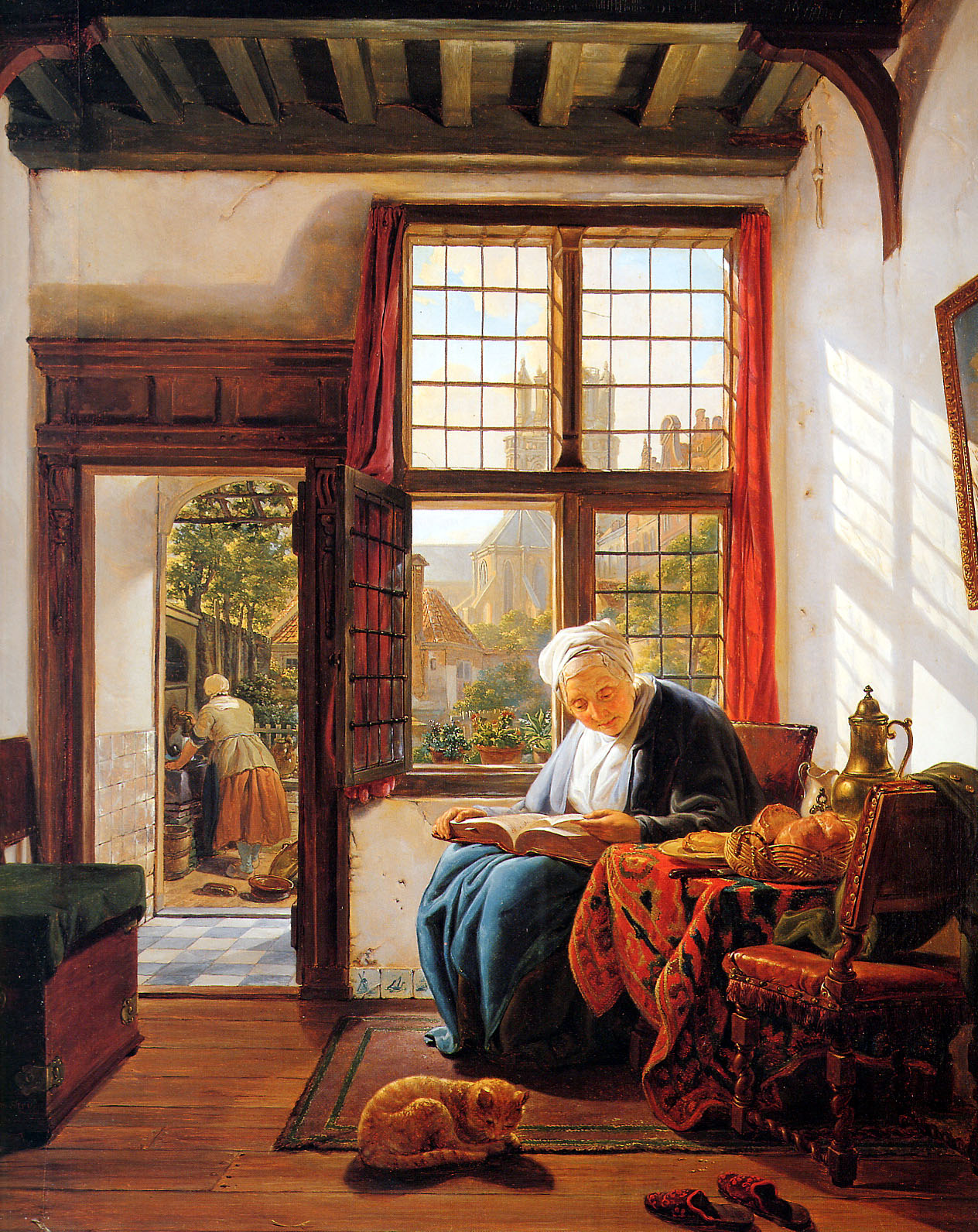
Abraham van Strij: Woman reading at the window
