= Adriaan van der Burg =

Dutch painter

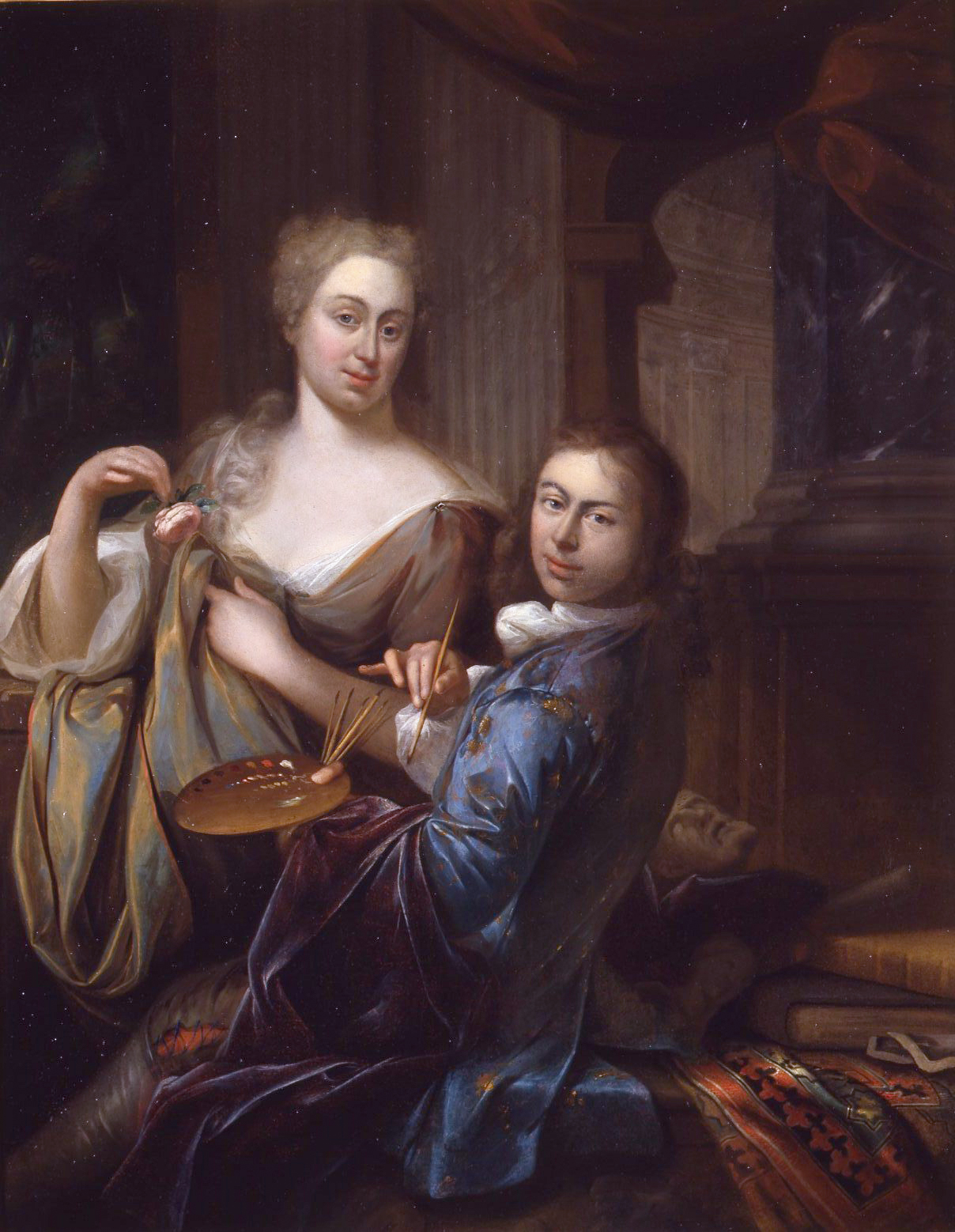
Selfportrait with his wife, 1729, Dordrecht Museum

Adriaan van der Burg (1693–1733) was an 18th-century painter from the Dutch Republic.

== Biography ==
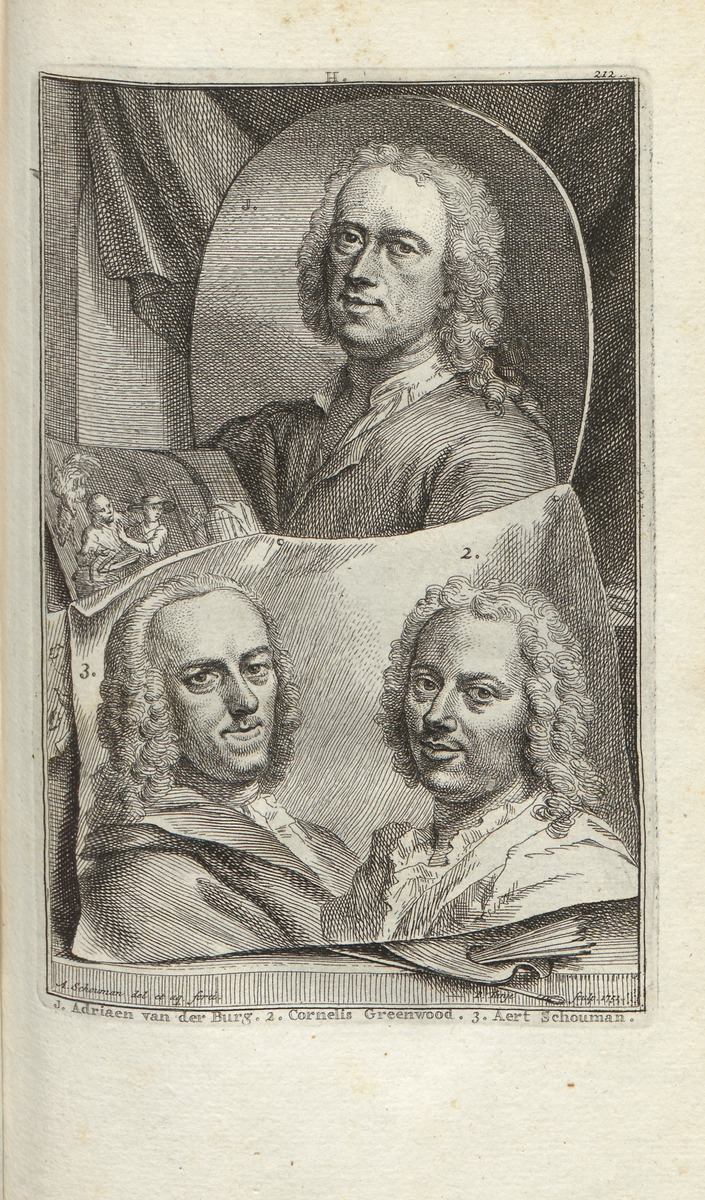
Portrait of Adriaan van der Burg above his two pupils Aert Schouoman (left) and Cornelis Greenwood (right).

Van der Burg was born and died in Dordrecht. According to Jan van Gool he was the pupil of Arnold Houbraken and accompanied him to Amsterdam where he completed his education before returning to Dordrecht, where he became a popular portrait painter and the teacher of Aert Schouman and Cornelis Greenwood. Schouman made the engraving voor Jan van Gool's book based on a self-portrait that Schouman bought from Adriaan van der Burg's widow.

According to the RKD he was the teacher of Aert Schouman and was known for interior decorations.
