= Johannes Christiaan Schotel =

Dutch painter (1787–1838)

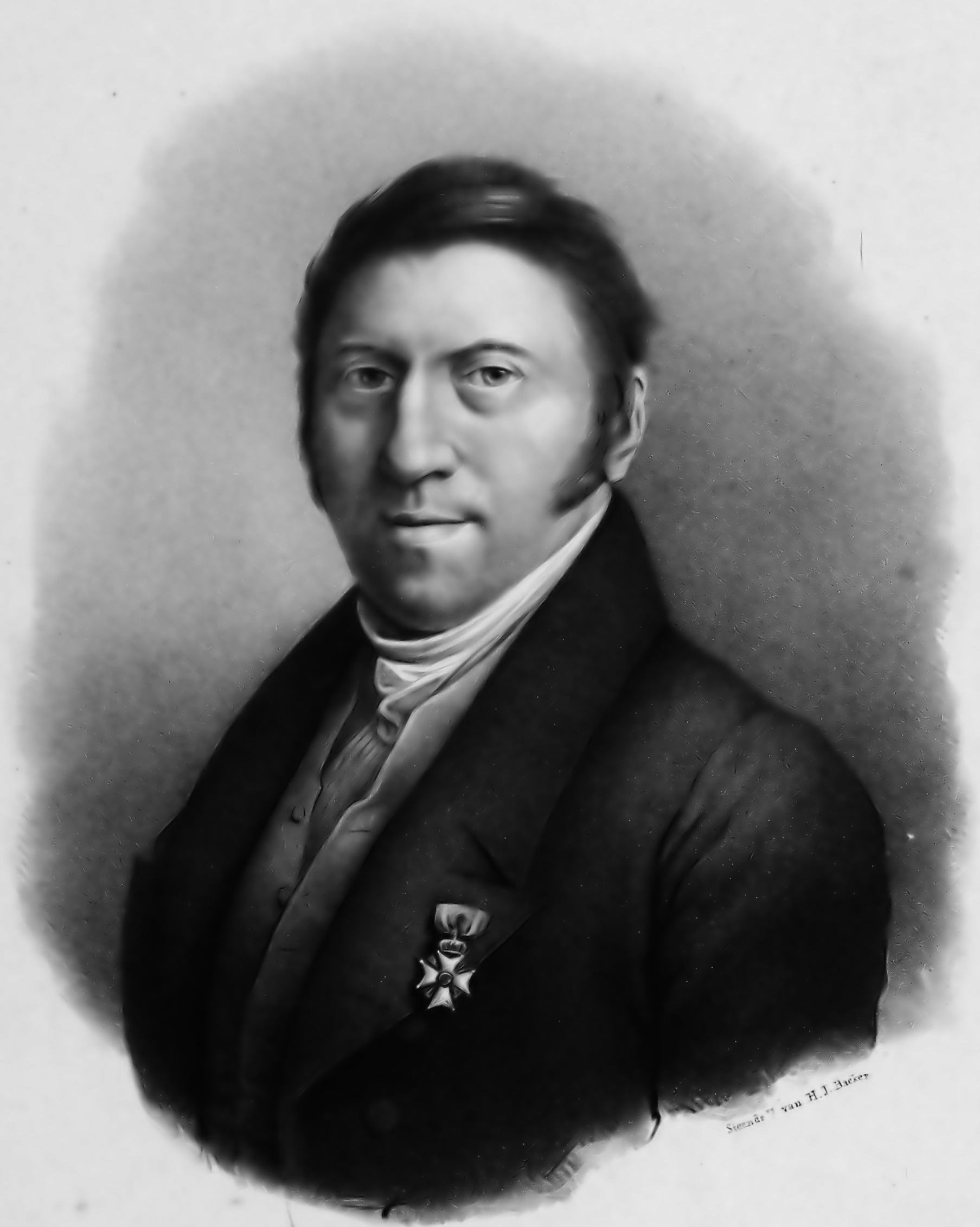
c. 1840 portrait of Schotel by Hilmar Johannes Backer

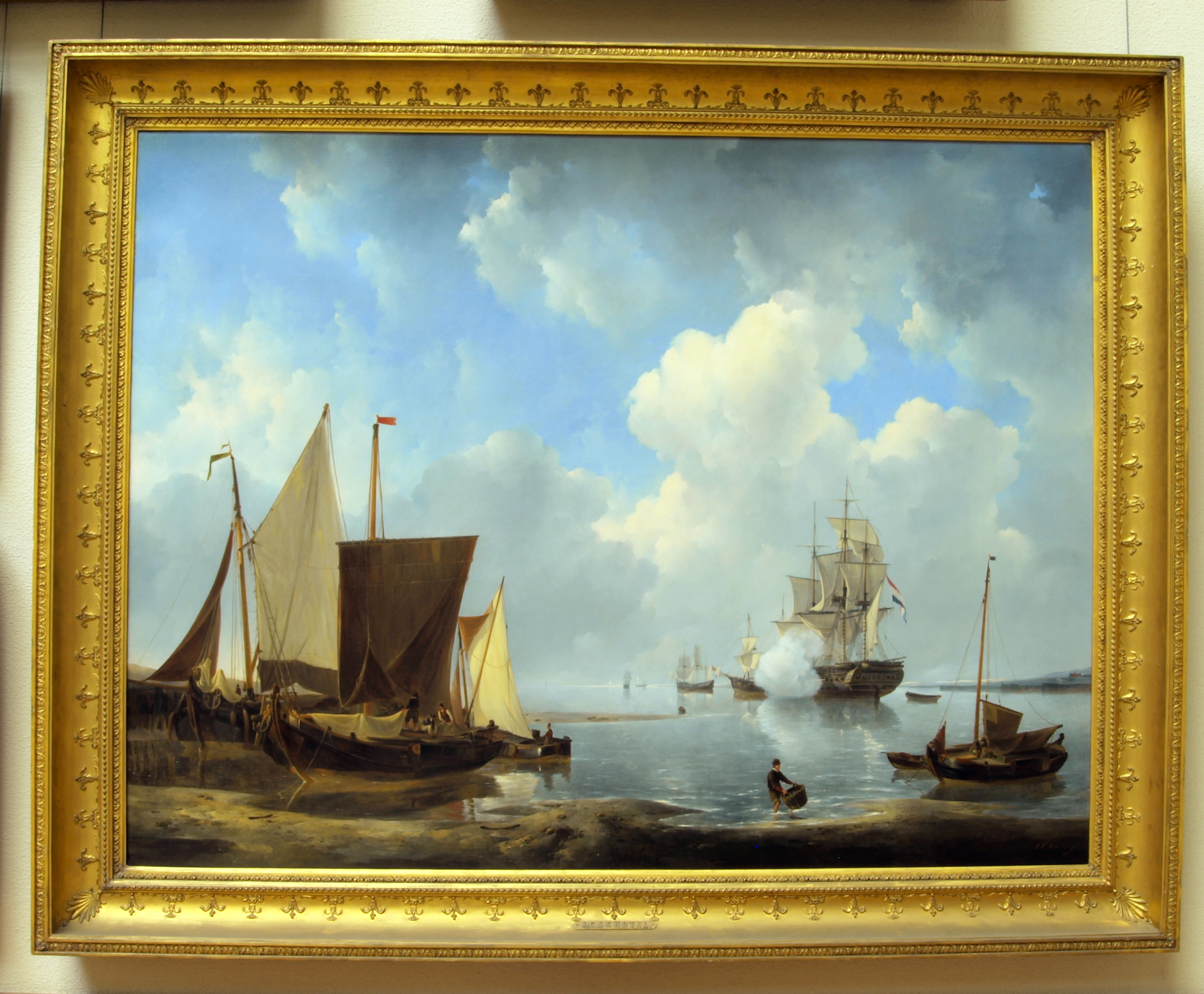
Calm sea, 1829, collection Teylers Museum

Johannes Christiaan Schotel (11 November 1787 – 21 December 1838) was a Dutch painter who specialised in marine art.

== Life ==
Johannes Christiaan Schotel was born on 11 November 1787 in Dordrecht. According to the RKD he was the pupil of Adriaan Meulemans, Martinus Schouman, Abraham van Strij, and Jacob van Strij. He was a member of the Dordrecht artist's society Pictura and was the father of Petrus Johannes Schotel. Schotel had left a legacy which remains in Dordecht to date, inside the Dordecht museum and throughout the world. He was a talented sailor and was admired for his depiction of the sea, specifically his ability to capture effects of light. Near to the end of his life he travelled to France and Belgium.

The 20th century art historian Pieter Scheen notes that J.C Schotel produced 214 paintings and around 275 drawings and watercolours. Paintings of the elder Schotel are in the museums of Amsterdam, Dordecht, Haarlem, Otterlo and Rotterdam, as well as in Hannover, Munich. Artwork by Schotel is continuously being sold internationally as of June 16, 2004, 'Fishing boats on the beach near Egmond at low tide' was sold in London, Signed 'J C Schotel' which valued the painting at £25,000.

Schotel is regarded as one of the preeminent Dutch marine painters of the early 19th century. His early illustrated studies can be found in the permanent collections of Princeton University Art Museum, New Jersey; The Morgan Library & Museum, New York; and The Metropolitan Museum of Art, New York. The painting, Low Tide Gun Salute From a Dutch Man o' War, measures a massive 63 1/2" tall and 84" wide. Until now, the paintings sold on the international market have dwarfed in comparison to this lot, which may be the largest of Schotel's paintings to public knowledge.
