= Joris Ponse =

Dutch painter

Joris Ponse (March 1723 – December 1783) was a Dutch painter primarily of birds, fruit, and flowers.

He was born and died in Dordrecht. Ponse was a scholar of Aert Schouman. He passed through many vicissitudes, being at one time reduced to gain a livelihood by house-painting. In middle life he was established at Amsterdam, where he had some pupils, among them Arie Lamme. His pictures are very scarce.
