= Vernon Lamme =

American archaeologist (1892–1979)

State Archaeologist of Florida
- In office June 10, 1935 – uncertain
- Appointed by: Governor David Sholtz

Personal details
- Born: 1892
- Died: 1979 (aged 86–87)
- Spouse: Louise Lamme
- Relatives: Bob Lamme (illustrator; possibly relative)
- Occupation: Writer, Editor, State Archaeologist
- Known for: First state archaeologist of Florida; writing on Floridian folklore

Vernone Lamme (1892 — 1979) was a writer and editor in Florida. He served as Florida's first state archaeologist. He wrote for Florida newspapers, was an amateur archaeologist and became an official overseeing archaeological excavations. Later in his life he authored books including Floridian lore.

He moved to Florida with his father in 1912.

After drafting legislation to establish a state archaeologist, he was appointed to the position by governor David Sholtz on June 10, 1935. He oversaw the excavation of various sites.

His actions drew controversy and critics called him a charlatan and accused him of corruption. He was dismissed from his position after several months, but was later reinstated and served until he resigned.

He was an alderman of the Marineland community and served as a government official.

Vernon ad Louise Lamme copyrighted a 62-page publication on Florida minstrel Stephen Foster with illustrations by Bob Lamme.

== Work ==
- More Florida Lore Not Found in History Books (1973), a compilation of his columns and stories
