= Antoinette Ockerse =

Dutch poet

Antonia Ockerse
- Born: 6 May 1762; Vianen
- Died: 25 December 1828 (aged 66); Leiden

Antonia or Antoinette Ockerse or Kleyn-Ockerse (1762 – 1828) was a Dutch poet.

Ockerse was born in Vianen and married Joannes Petrus Kleyn in 1784, also a poet. She and her husband lived in Drimmelen and published poems, and they were both members of an orangist-circle that wrote patriotic poetry, along with the poet Jacobus Bellamy. Antonia Kleyn published several "Odes" and Bellamy also called his poems "Odes" in her style. She survived her husband and her son, the painter Pieter Rudolph Kleijn who died from battle wounds in 1815. Her daughter Adelaide Geertruid Kleyn also became a poet.

She died in Leiden and the Antoinette Kleynstraat there is named after her.
