= Jacob van Strij =

Dutch painter

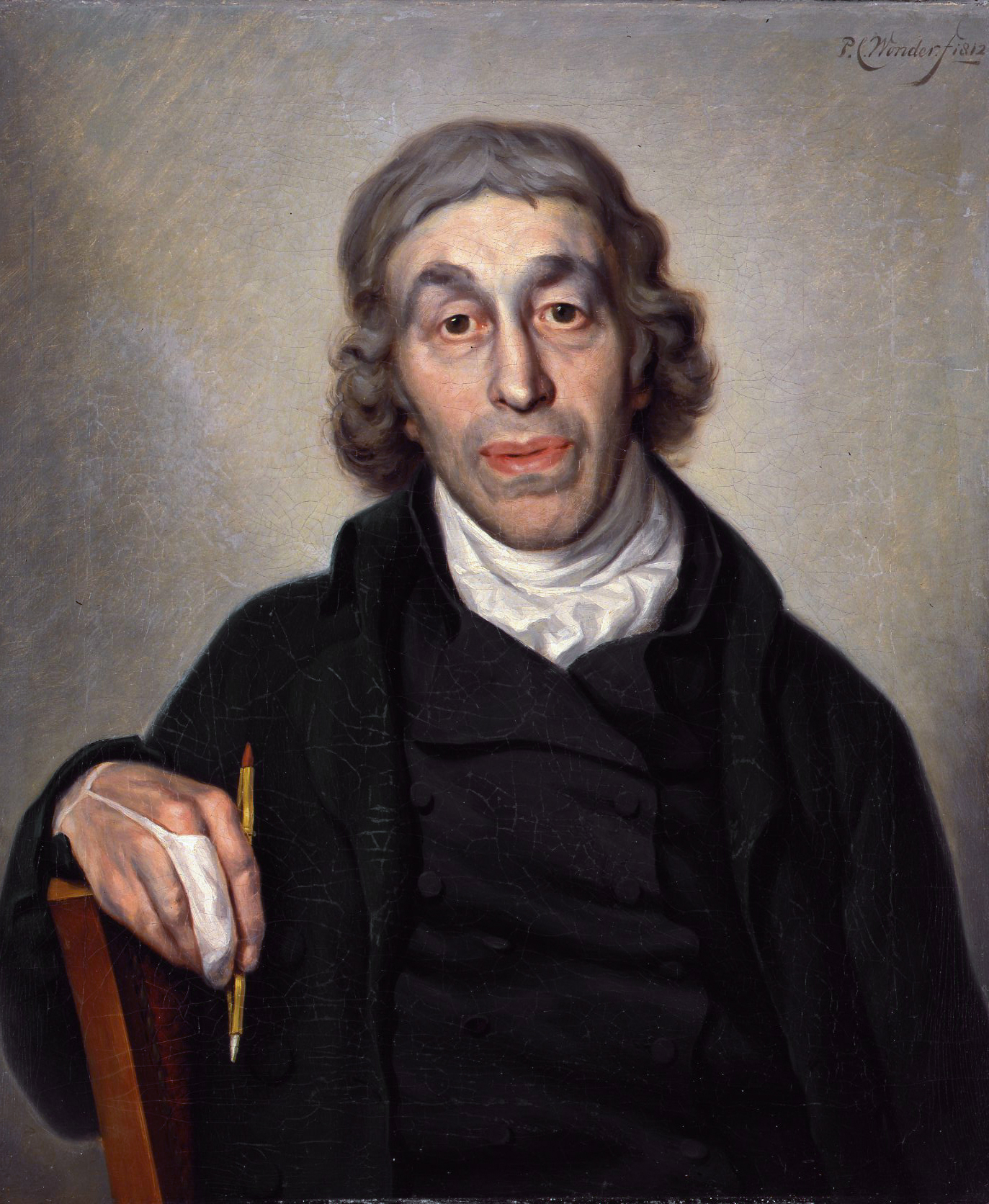
- Jacob van Strij (1812) by Pieter Christoffel Wonder
- Born: 2 October 1756; Dordrecht, Dutch Republic
- Died: 4 February 1815 (aged 58); Dordrecht, United Netherlands

Jacob van Strij (2 October 1756 – 4 February 1815) was a Dutch painter, printmaker, and draftsman who was mainly interested in landscape painting, including mountain landscapes, winter landscapes and marines.

== Life and career ==
Jacob van Strij was born on 2 October 1756 in Dordrecht in the Dutch Republic. He was the son of Leendert van Strij and the younger brother of Abraham van Strij.

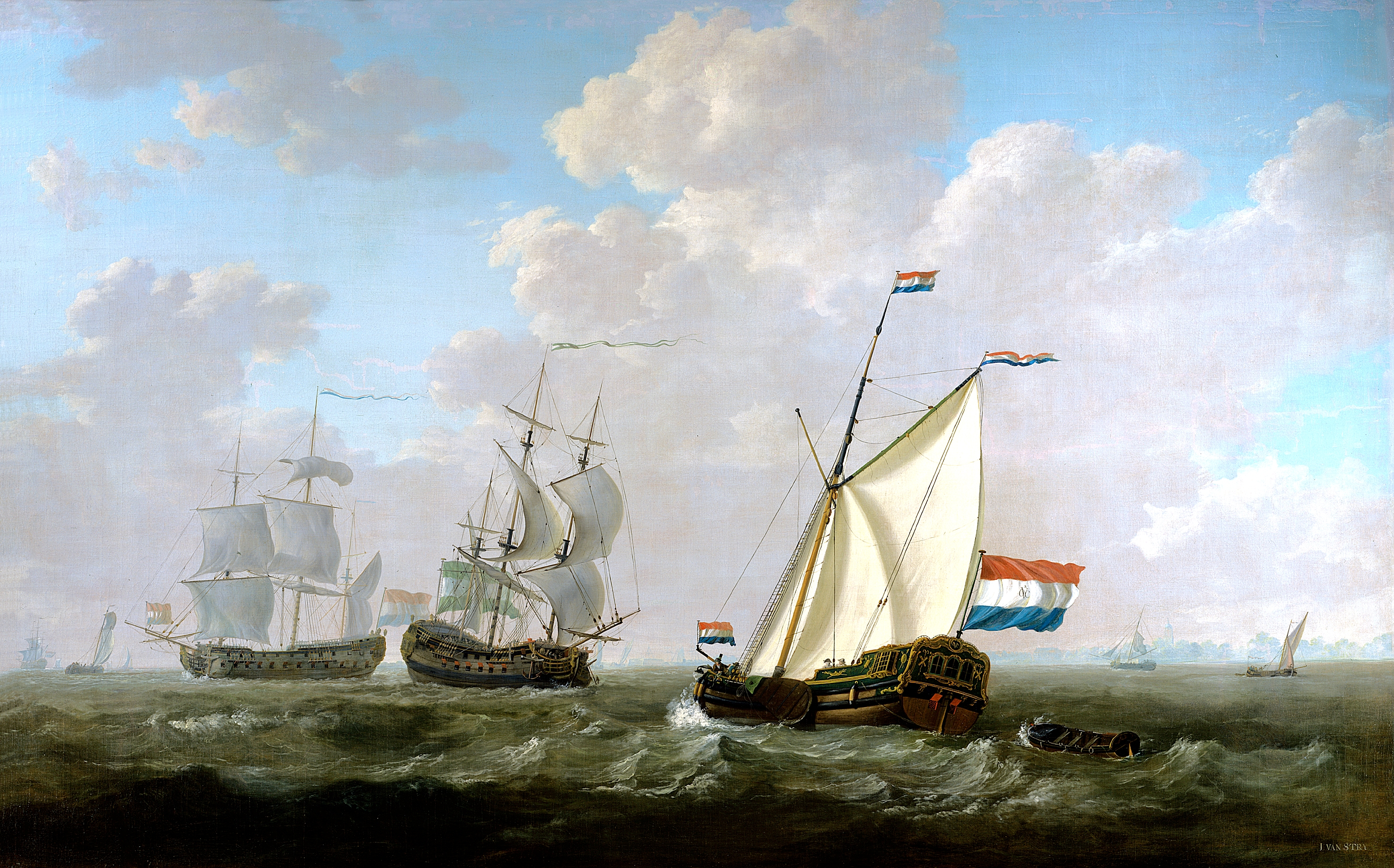
The yacht of the Rotterdam chamber of the Dutch East India Company greets a VoC ship near Hellevoetsluis 1790

Both he and his brother were pupils of his father. He traveled to Antwerp where between 1774 and 1776 he attended the classes of Andries Cornelis Lens, a teacher and director of the Academy of Fine Arts of Antwerp. Jacob joined his father's workshop.

Jacob's brother Abraham van Strij was a leading founding member of the Teekengenootschap Pictura Dordrecht (Drawing Society Pictura Dordrecht) when it was established in 1774. Jacob also joined Pictura after his return from his study period in Antwerp. He was described by his contemporaries as a well-read man who was held in high esteem. He gave lectures at the Teekengenootschap Pictura Dordrecht on the paintings of the old masters and mythology.

Jacob's son Hendrik also became a painter. He and his brother took on pupils after taking over their father's workshop. Their pupils were Pieter Rudolph Kleijn, Johannes van Lexmond, Jacob de Meijer, Johannes Rutten, Johannes Schoenmakers, Johannes Christiaan Schotel, and Gillis Smak Gregoor.

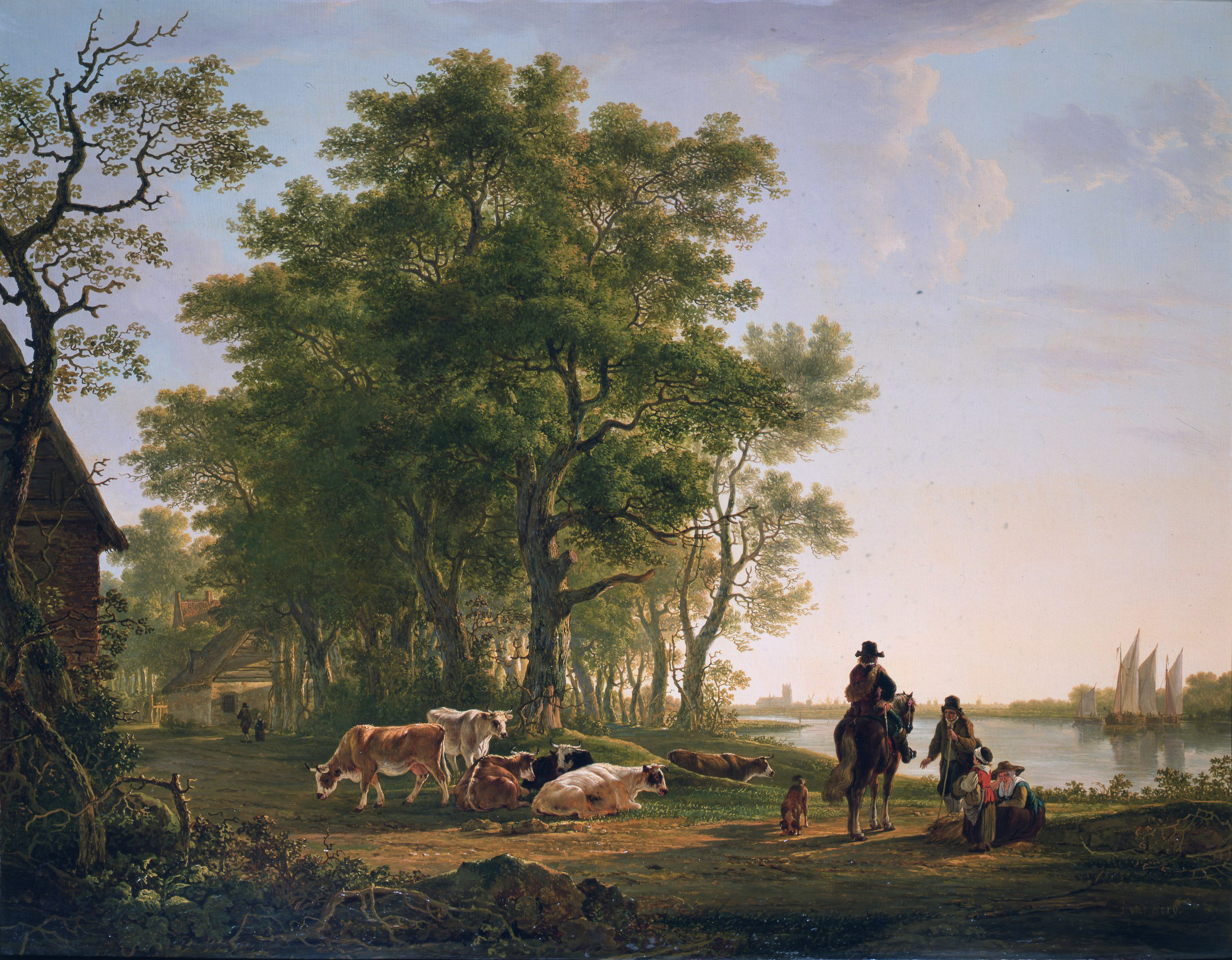
Landscape with trees and cattle, Dordrecht in the background

Van Strij died on 4 February 1815, at the age of 58, in Dordrecht.

== Work ==
Jacob van Strij painted italianate landscapes, mountain landscapes, cityscapes, winter landscapes, portraits, architectural paintings and marines. He took his inspiration from the 17th-century landscape painters of the Dutch Golden Age, in particular Aelbert Cuyp.

Jacob van Strij put a lot of effort and devotion in creating his winter scenes. In order to achieve an accurate imitation of nature he overcame his ill health (he suffered from gout) and went out in the biting cold on a drawn sleigh to make sketches for his compositions. These sketches were used in his studio for various paintings. Van Strij is known to have painted variations of his own compositions.
