= Martinus Schouman =

Dutch painter (1770–1848)

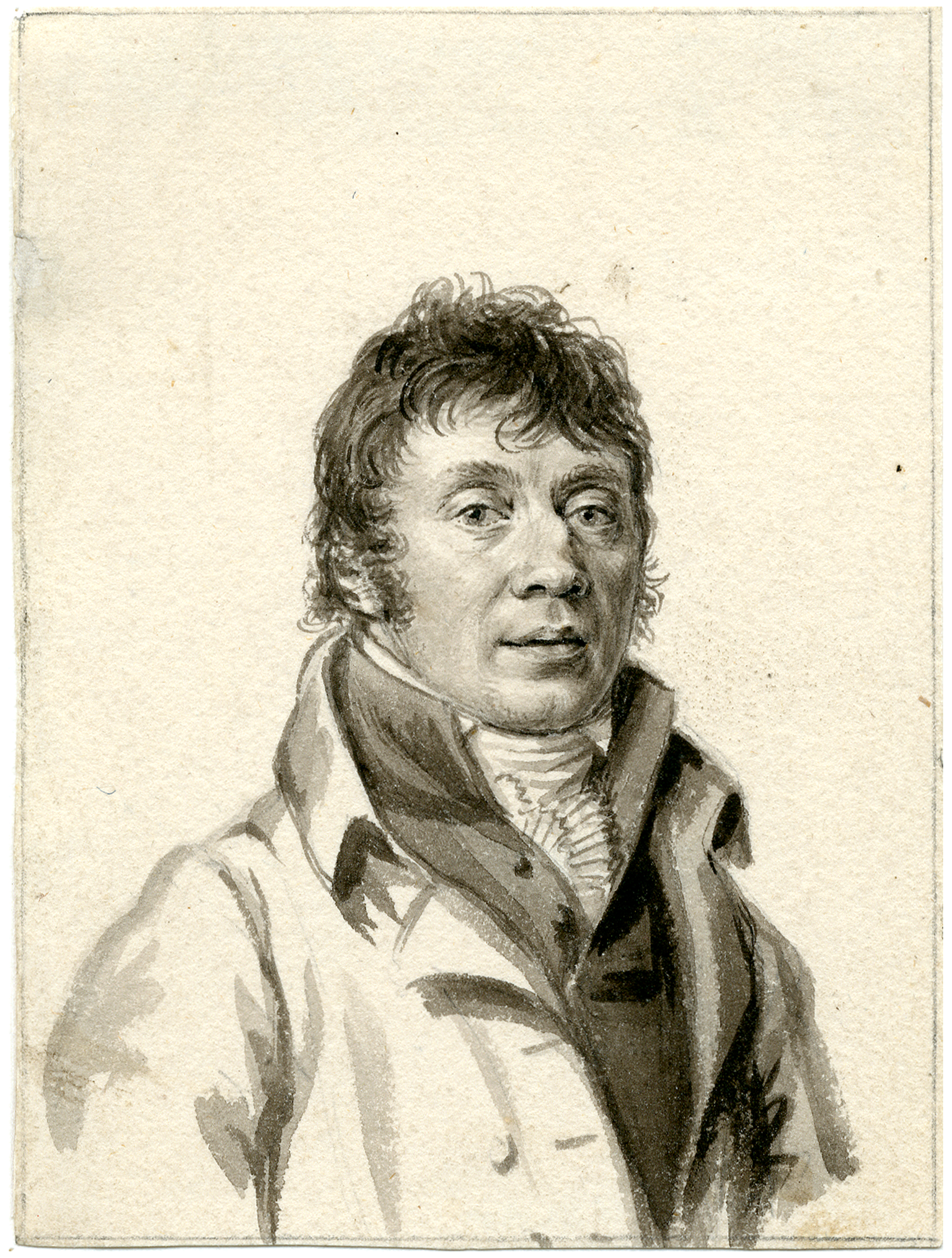
- Portrait of Schouman
- Born: 29 January 1770; Dordrecht, Dutch Republic
- Died: 30 October 1848 (aged 78); Breda, Netherlands

Martinus Schouman (29 January 1770 – 30 October 1848) was a Dutch painter who specialised in marine art.

== Life ==
Schouman was born in 1770 in Dordrecht. According to the RKD he was the pupil and grandnephew of Aert Schouman and the brother of Aert II. His pupils were Pieter Arnout Dijxhoorn, Jan de Greef, Pieter Martinus Gregoor, Matthijs Quispel, Johannes Christiaan Schotel, and his son Izaak Schouman. He is known for marines and landscapes and was a member of the Dordrecht artist's society Pictura and the Royal society of the fine arts in Brussels. He died in 1848 in Breda.

== Gallery ==
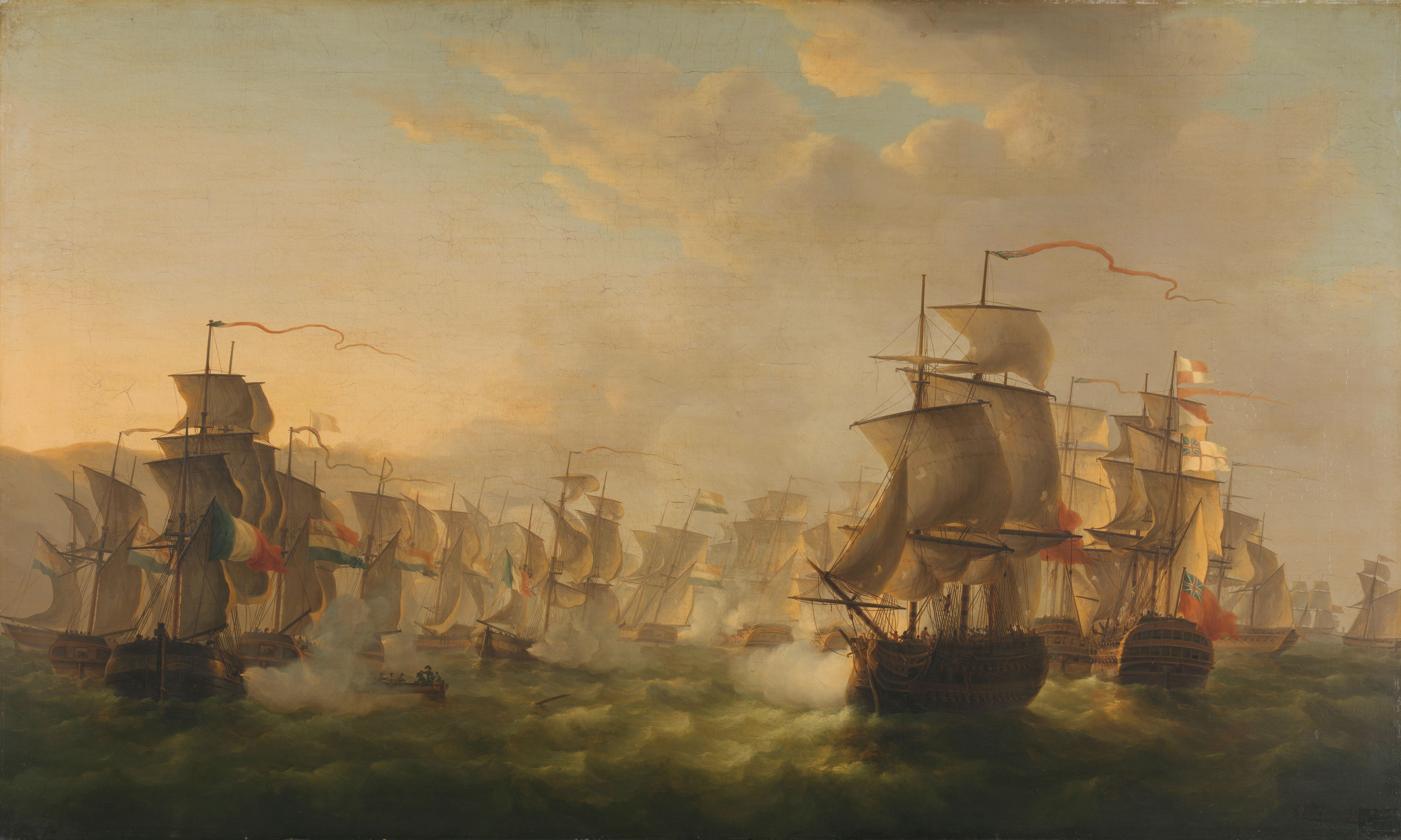
The engagement between the Dutch and British fleets during the Dutch flotilla's voyage to Boulogne, 1805 (1806)

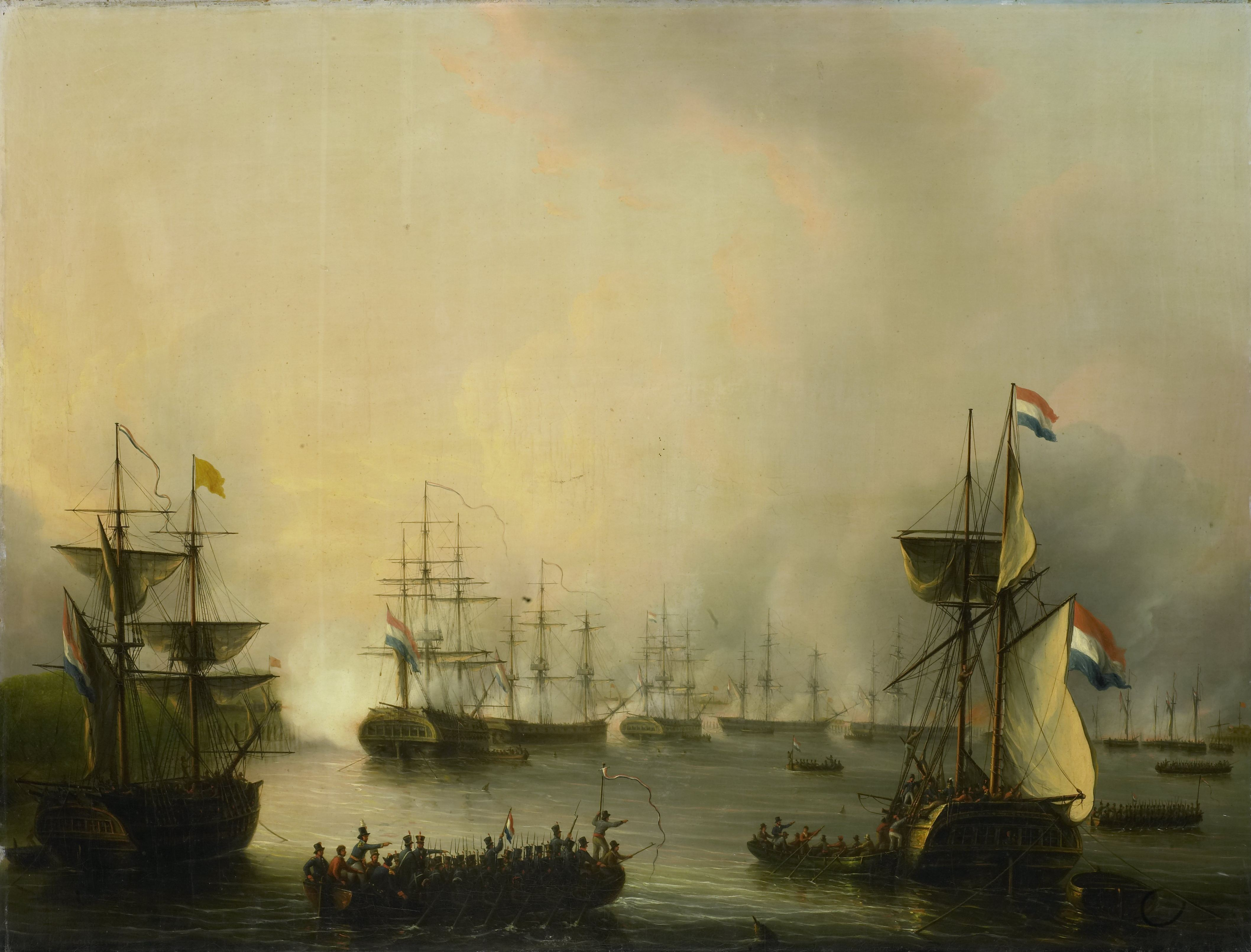
The bombardment of Palembang, Sumatra, 24 June 1821 (1821–1848)

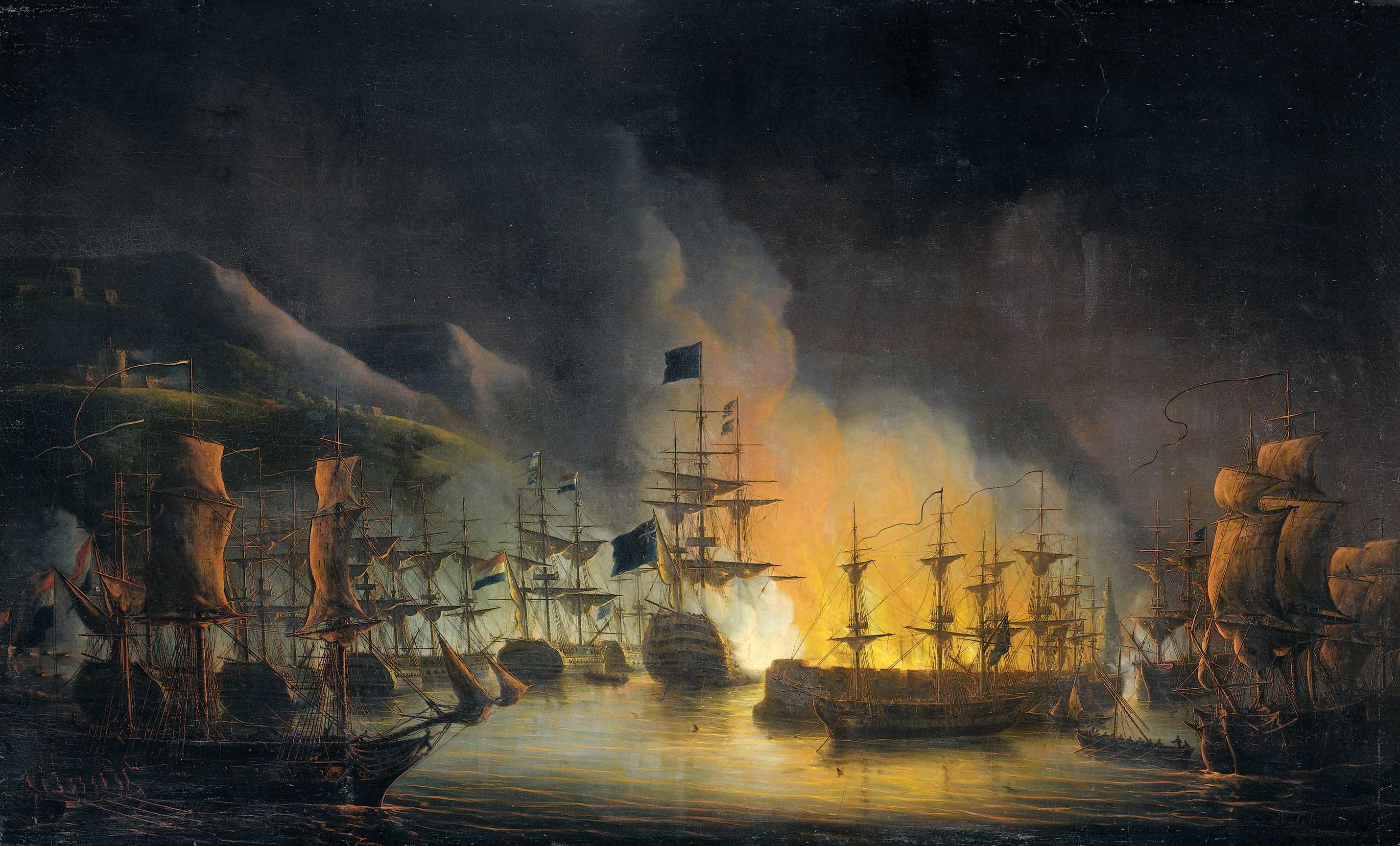
The bombardment of Algiers, in support of the ultimatum to free white slaves, August 26-27, 1816 (1823)

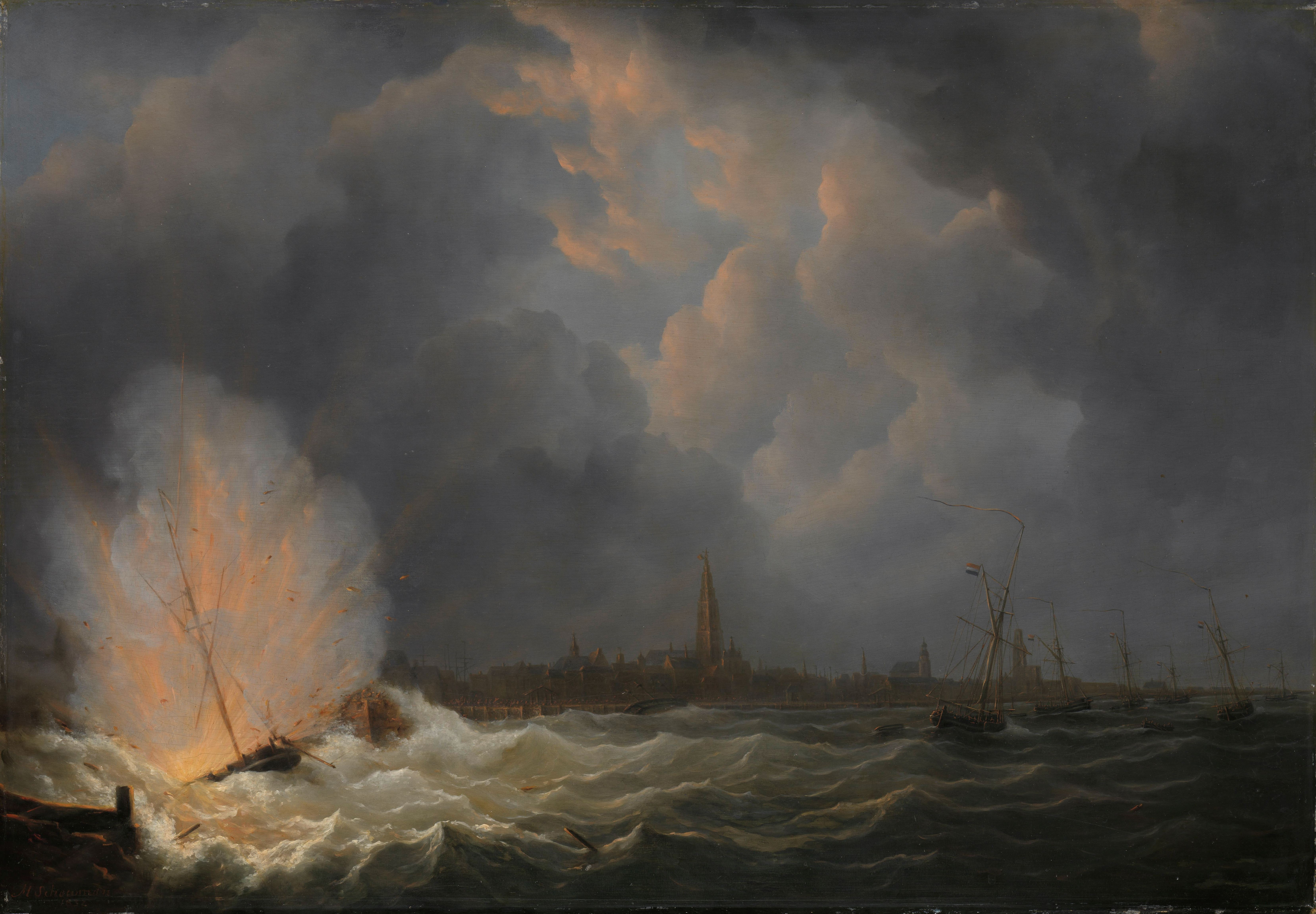
The explosion of gunboat No. 2 under the command of Jan van Speijk off Antwerp, February 5, 1831 (1832)
