= Pieter Rudolph Kleijn =

Dutch painter

- Born: 17 May 1785; Hooge Zwaluwe, Drimmelen
- Died: 15 February 1816 (aged 30); Leiden

Pieter Rudolph Kleijn or Kleyn (17 May 1785 – 15 February 1816) was a 19th-century landscape painter from the Netherlands who died young.

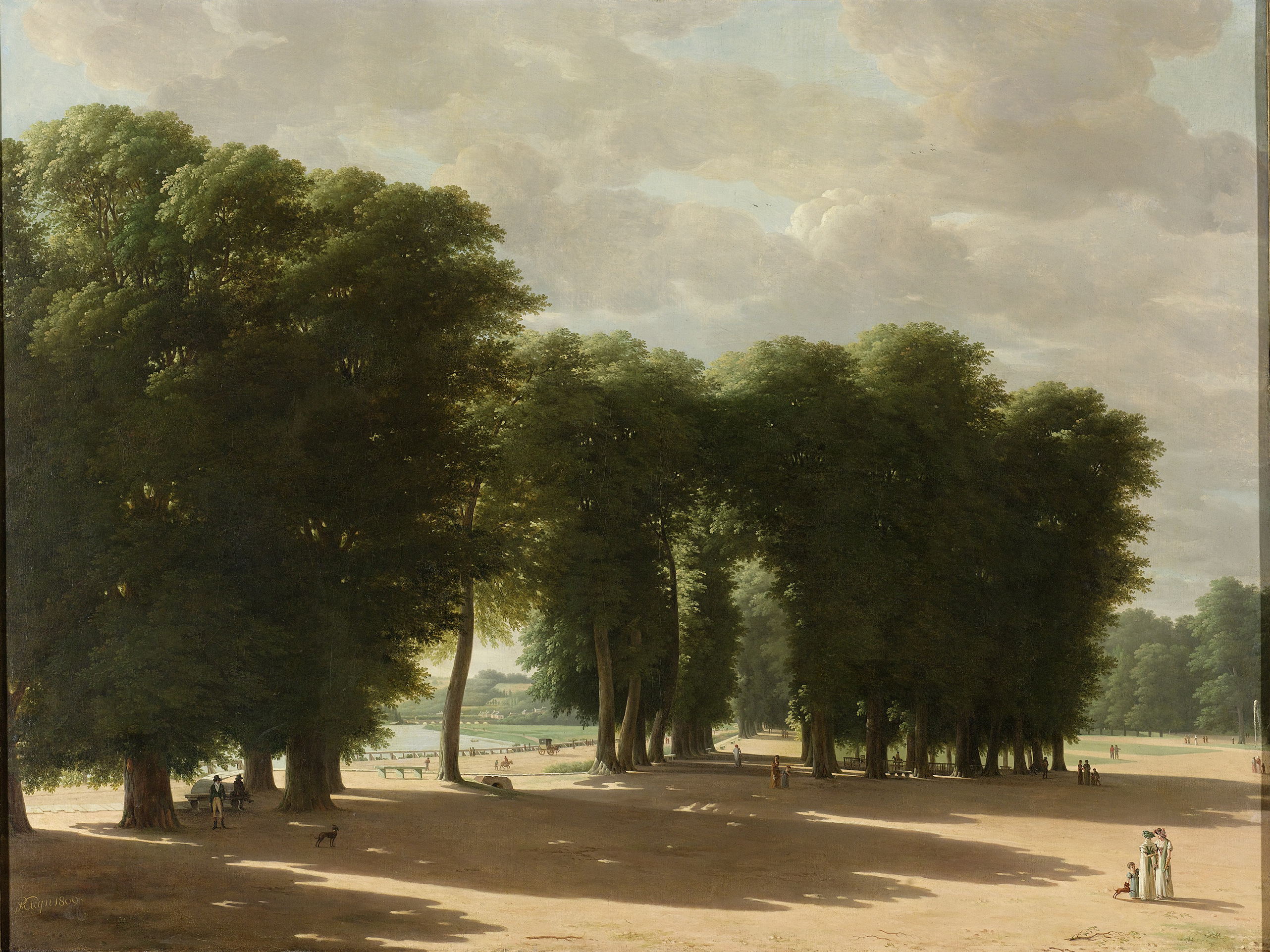
The Entrance to the Parc de Saint-Cloud, Paris, 1809

Kleijn was born in Hooge Zwaluwe as one of seven children of the mayor, lawyer and poet Johannes Petrus Kleyn and the poet Antoinette Ockerse. The poet Adelaide Geertruid Kleyn was his sister. He was trained by the brothers Abraham and Jacob van Strij in Dordrecht.

In 1808, he was selected for the prestigious prix-de-Rome under Lodewijk Napoleon and travelled to Paris where he studied two 1/2 years under Jacques-Louis David. He then travelled to Rome where he spent another two years studying but returned north in 1815 when the monarchy of the Kingdom of the Netherlands was restored. Eager to show his allegiance to the newly restored monarchy, he enlisted as a 2nd lieutenant in the Dutch army, but was wounded at the Battle of Quatre Bras. He received the Military William Order, but never fully recovered and died of his wounds in the arms of his mother.
