= Arie Lamme =

Dutch landscape painter and poet (1748–1801)

Arie Lamme (8 January 1748 – 18 March 1801) was a Dutch landscape painter and poet.

== Early life and education ==
Lamme was born at Heerjansdam and studied under Joris Ponse at Utrecht; he practiced in the style of Aelbert Cuyp. He was much engaged on decorative work, and was also a poet. His daughter, Cornelia, married the painter Johann Baptist Scheffer and was the mother of Ary and Hendrik Scheffer. He died in Dordrecht, aged 53.
