= Aert Schouman =

Dutch painter

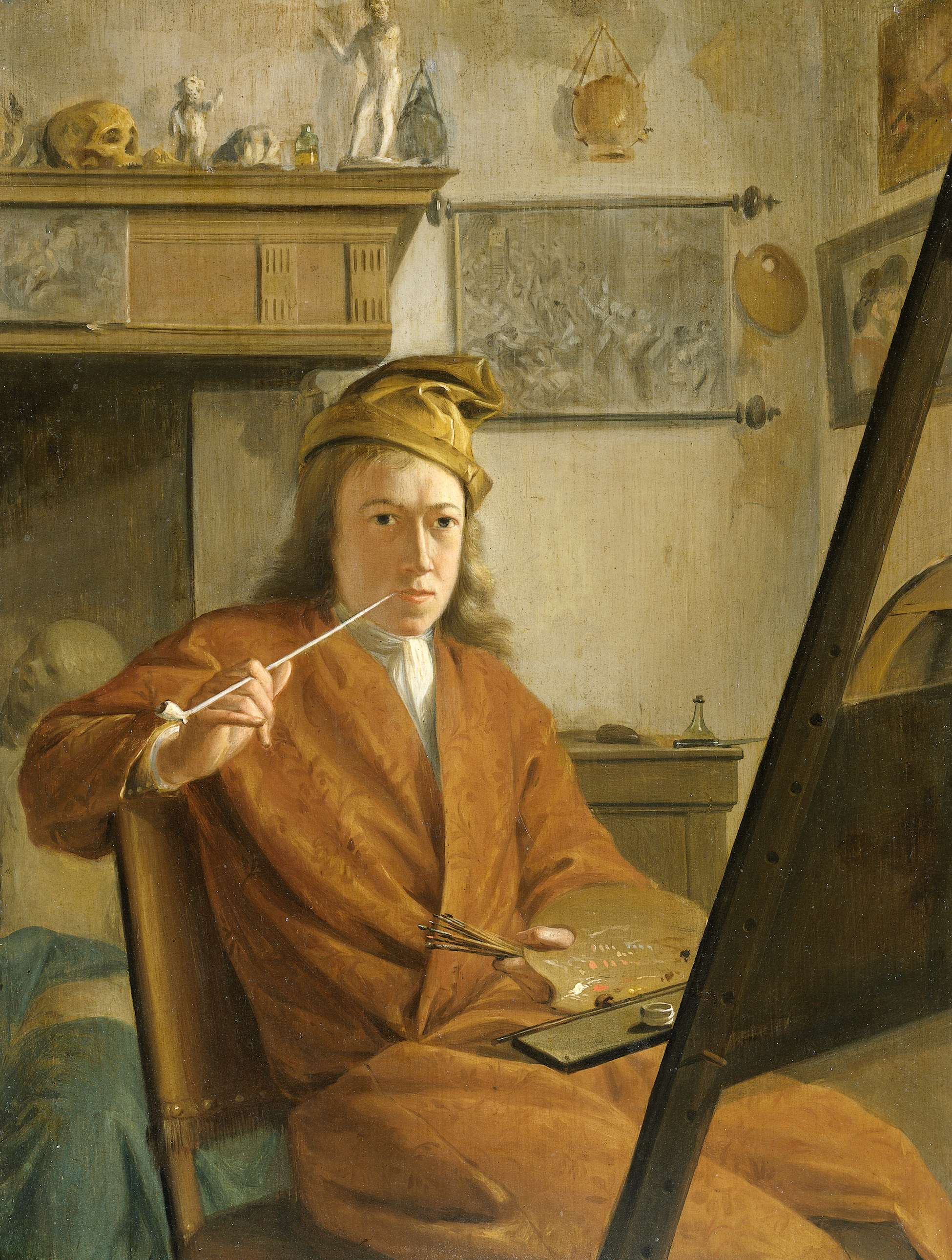
Aart Schouman, selfportrait, 1730

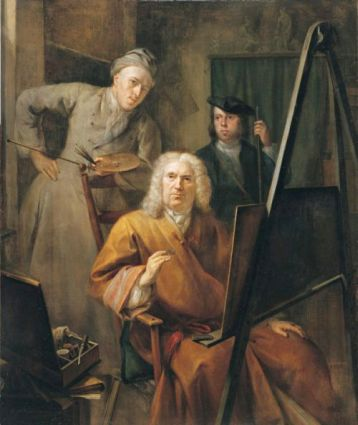
Portrait of Cornelis van Lill (seated), his grandson and Aert Schouman

Aert Schouman or Aart Schouman (4 March 1710 – 5 July 1792) was an 18th-century painter, now better known as a glass engraver, from the Dutch Republic.

Schouman was born in Dordrecht. When 15 years old he served as apprentice to the Dordrecht artist Adriaan van der Burg, along with Cornelis Greenwood, the son of his teacher for glass engraving, Frans Greenwood, inventor of the stipple style, which Schouman also worked in. Schouman was unusual among painters in that he kept a detailed diary of his professional life from 16 October 1733 to 16 November 1753. He took on his first art pupil in 1733 and continued teaching for the rest of his life. From 1742 until 1792 he was head of the Dordrecht Guild of St. Luke, and in 1751 he became regent of the Hague drawing school associated with the Confrerie Pictura of The Hague. In 1736 he founded the "Brotherhood" of the Confrerie in The Hague, a fraternity of amateur art lovers from Dordrecht and environs, of which he was headman from 1752 until 1762.

Schouman was a leading artist in Zeeland between 1735 and 1785. During that period he lived and worked in Dordrecht, The Hague and Middelburg and taught pupils in Dordrecht and The Hague. He travelled to England twice and assembled an important collection of paintings. He was a prolific and versatile Dutch painter, glass engraver, printmaker, collector and dealer, who produced still lifes, biblical and mythological themes, natural history studies, genre, historical and topographical works, portraits, sketches, etchings and mezzotints. He designed tapestries, painted wall-hangings and decorated objects such as fans, snuffboxes and even the glass windows of a magic lantern. His pupils were Wouter Dam, Jabes Heenck, Dirk Kuipers, Pieter Willem van Megen, Nicolaes Muys, Jan van Os Joris Ponse, Martinus Schouman (his grandnephew), Jan Willem Snoek, Rutger Moens Taats, Wouter Uiterlimmige, Wilhelmus Vincentius, Jacobus Vonck, and Daniël Vrijdag. He died in The Hague, aged 82.

His painting of Cornelis van Lill, the Dordrecht art collector and Maecenas, gives an insight into the relationship between artist and patron.

== Bibliography ==
- Laurens J. Bol Aert Schouman. Dordrecht 1710-1792 's-Gravenhage. Tentoonstelling bijeengebracht uit openbaar en particulier bezit van tekeningen, aquarellen en prenten, Rijksprentenkabinet Rijksmuseum Amsterdam 1961
- Meile D. Haga La Voliere Imaginaire. Aquarelles d'oiseaux par Aert Schouman (1710-17920), Paris, 1982
- Laurens J. Bol Aart Schouman. Ingenious painter and draughtsman, Doornspijk, 1991 ISBN 90-70288-73-7
