= List of paintings by Adriaen Coorte =

The following is an incomplete list of paintings by Adriaen Coorte that are generally accepted as autograph by Laurens J. Bol and other sources. The list is in order of creation, starting from the 1680s when Coorte began painting scenes after his teacher Melchior d'Hondecoeter in Amsterdam. In the mid 1680s he moved to Middelburg, where his paintings can still be found in private collections.

Image	Title	Date	Collection	Inventory number
	Two peaches and a fritillary butterfly on a stone plinth	1680s	Private collection	
	Pelican and ducks in a mountain landscape	1683	Ashmolean Museum	A813
	Mountainous landscape with ducks	1684	George Kremer	
	Hen with her chicks	1684	Private collection	
	Still life with a Butterfly, Apricots, Cherries, and a Chestnut	1685	Private collection	
	Strawberries, Asparagus, and Gooseberries with a Tablecloth	1685	Private collection	
	Strawberries, Asparagus, and Gooseberries in a Niche	1685	Private collection	
	Fruit on a stone table in front of a wooded hilly landscape	1685	Private collection	
	Strawberries and red currants with a roemer on a marble ledge	1685	Private collection	
	Vanitas Still Life with skull and hourglass	1686	Private collection	
	Still life with hanging bunch of grapes, two medlars and a butterfly	1687	Private collection	
	Vanitas still life in a niche	1688	Zeeuws Museum	M 89-026
	Still life with fruit and a grapevine	1688	Private collection	
	Still life with peach and two apricots	1692	Private collection	
	Still life with a spray of gooseberries	1693	Gemäldegalerie Alte Meister	
	Still life with a bowl of strawberries	1693	Private collection	
	Still life with three medlars and a butterfly	1694	Private collection	
	Still life with asparagus and artichoke	1694	Kurpfälzisches Museum	2575
	Still life with three peaches on a stone ledge and a butterfly	1695	Private collection	
	Grapes, Peaches and Apricots on a Stone Plinth	1695	Private collection	
	Still life with a bowl of strawberries and a spray of gooseberries	1696	Private collection	
	Peaches and apricots on a stone ledge	1696	Private collection	
	Asparagus and red currants on a stone ledge	1696	Private collection	
	Still life with two large and four smaller shells	1696	Department of Paintings of the Louvre	RF 1970-54
	Still life with two large and three smaller shells	1696	Department of Paintings of the Louvre	RF 1970-53
	Still Life with Hazel-nuts	1696	Ashmolean Museum	A545
	Two Peaches	1696	Private collection	
	Still life with a bowl of strawberries and a spray of gooseberries	1696	Private collection	
	A Bowl of Strawberries on a Stone Plinth	1696	Rijksmuseum	SK-C-1687
	Still Life with Asparagus and Red Currants	1696	National Gallery of Art	2002.122.1
	Still life with four shells	1697	Private collection	
	Still Life with Herring, Bread, and Glass of Beer	1697	Private collection	
	Still life with flowers, shells and a butterfly	1697	Private collection	
	Strawberries in a Stone Jar	1697	Hermitage Museum	ГЭ-2942
	Still Life with Asparagus	1697	Rijksmuseum	SK-A-2099
	Seashells	1698	Eijk and Rose-Marie van Otterloo Collection	
	Asparagus, Gooseberries and Strawberries on a Stone Ledge	1698	Dordrechts Museum	DM/973/469
	Still Life with Shells	1698	Private collection	
	Black Currants	1698	Private collection	
	Orange	1698	Private collection	
	Four Apricots on a Stone Plinth	1698	Rijksmuseum	SK-C-1688
	Schelpen op een stenen plint	1698	Rijksmuseum	SK-C-1761
	Still Life of Asparagus	1699	Ashmolean Museum	A546
	Asparagus, Gooseberries and Strawberries in a Window, with a View of a Bird in a Tree	1699	Private collection	
	A Sprig of Gooseberries on a Stone Plinth	1699	Rijksmuseum	SK-C-1689
	Still life with a bowl of strawberries on a stone table	1700s	Private collection	
	Pot of Strawberries	1700s	Private collection	
	Spray of Gooseberries on a Stone Plinth	1700	Private collection	
	Still-Life with Strawberries	1700	Private collection	
	Gooseberries	1700	Private collection	
	Gooseberries on a Table	1701	Cleveland Museum of Art	1987.32
	Still life with a spray of gooseberries	1702	Chi Mei Museum	A546
	Two Walnuts	1702	Museum of Fine Arts, Budapest	75.9
	Still Life of Asparagus	1703	Fitzwilliam Museum; National Gallery	2575
	A Pot of Strawberries, Gooseberries, and a Bundle of Asparagus on a Stone Plinth	1703	National Gallery London	
	Still life with asparagus, a spray of gooseberries, a bowl of strawberries and other fruit in a niche	1703	Royal Museum of Fine Arts Antwerp (KMSKA)	5035
	Wild Strawberries in a Wan Li Bowl	1704	Los Angeles County Museum of Art	M.2009.106.5
	Wild strawberries on a ledge	1704	Private collection	
	Still life with five apricots	1704	Mauritshuis	1154
	Chestnuts	1705	Private collection	
	Spray of Green Gooseberries on a Stone Plinth	1705	Private collection	
	Spray of Red Gooseberries on a Stone Plinth	1705	Private collection	
	Still Life with Strawberries	1705	Mauritshuis	1106
	Three Peaches on a Stone Plinth	1705	Rijksmuseum	SK-C-1690
	Bunch of Grapes	1705	Museum Boijmans Van Beuningen	St 118

== Sources ==
- Adriaen Coorte: A Unique Late 17th Century Dutch Still Life Painter, by Laurens J. Bol, Van Gorkum, 1977
- Adriaen Coorte in the RKD
