= Human interactions with molluscs =

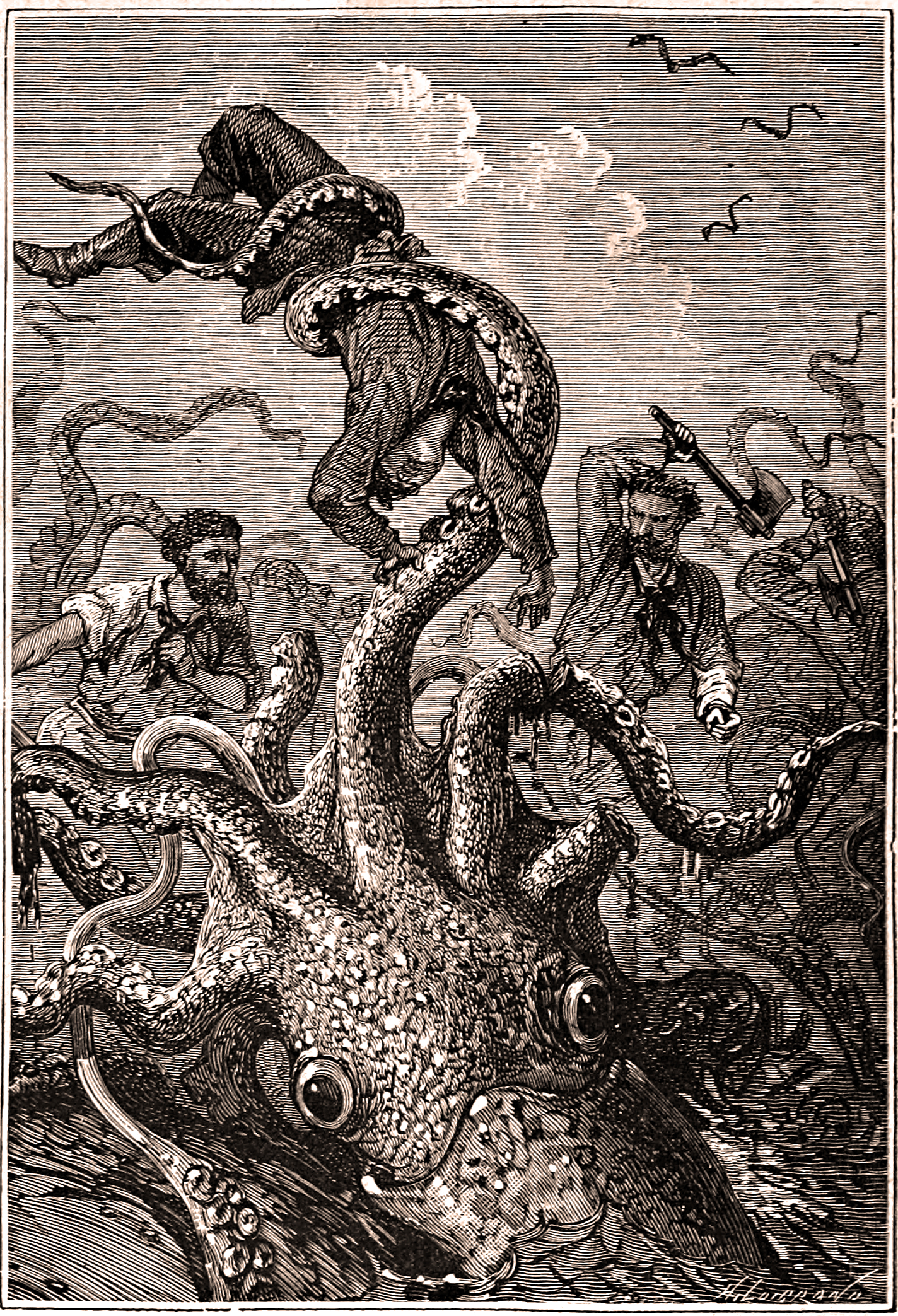
Molluscan sea monster, by Alphonse de Neuville to illustrate Jules Verne's Twenty Thousand Leagues Under the Seas, 1871

Humans have made multiple uses of molluscs, including as food, and they feature in art and in literature.

Useful interactions with molluscs range from their use as food, where species as diverse as snails and squid are eaten in many countries, to the employment of molluscs as shell money and to make dyestuffs and musical instruments, for personal adornment with seashells, pearls, or mother-of-pearl, as items to be collected, as fictionalised sea monsters, and as raw materials for craft items such as Sailor's Valentines. Some bivalves are used as bioindicators to monitor the health of marine and freshwater environments.

Harmful interactions with molluscs include the stings of cone snails and the venomous bites of certain octopuses; blue-ringed octopuses bite only when provoked, but their venom kills a quarter of the people bitten. Some snails are vectors of diseases such as schistosomiasis, a major tropical disease that infects some 200 million people; others are serious crop pests, and species such as the giant East African snail Lissachatina fulica have damaged ecosystems in areas where they have been introduced.

Mollusc shells have been widely used in art, whether carved directly, sometimes as cameos, or depicted in paintings. In popular culture, the snail is known for its stereotypical slowness, while the octopus and giant squid have featured in literature since classical times as monsters of the deep. Many-headed and tentacled monsters appear as the Gorgon and the Medusa of Greek mythology, and the kraken of Nordic legend. The taxonomist Carl Linnaeus named the Venus shell as Venus dione, for the goddess of love and her mother, and named its parts using overtly sexual descriptors.

== Practical uses ==
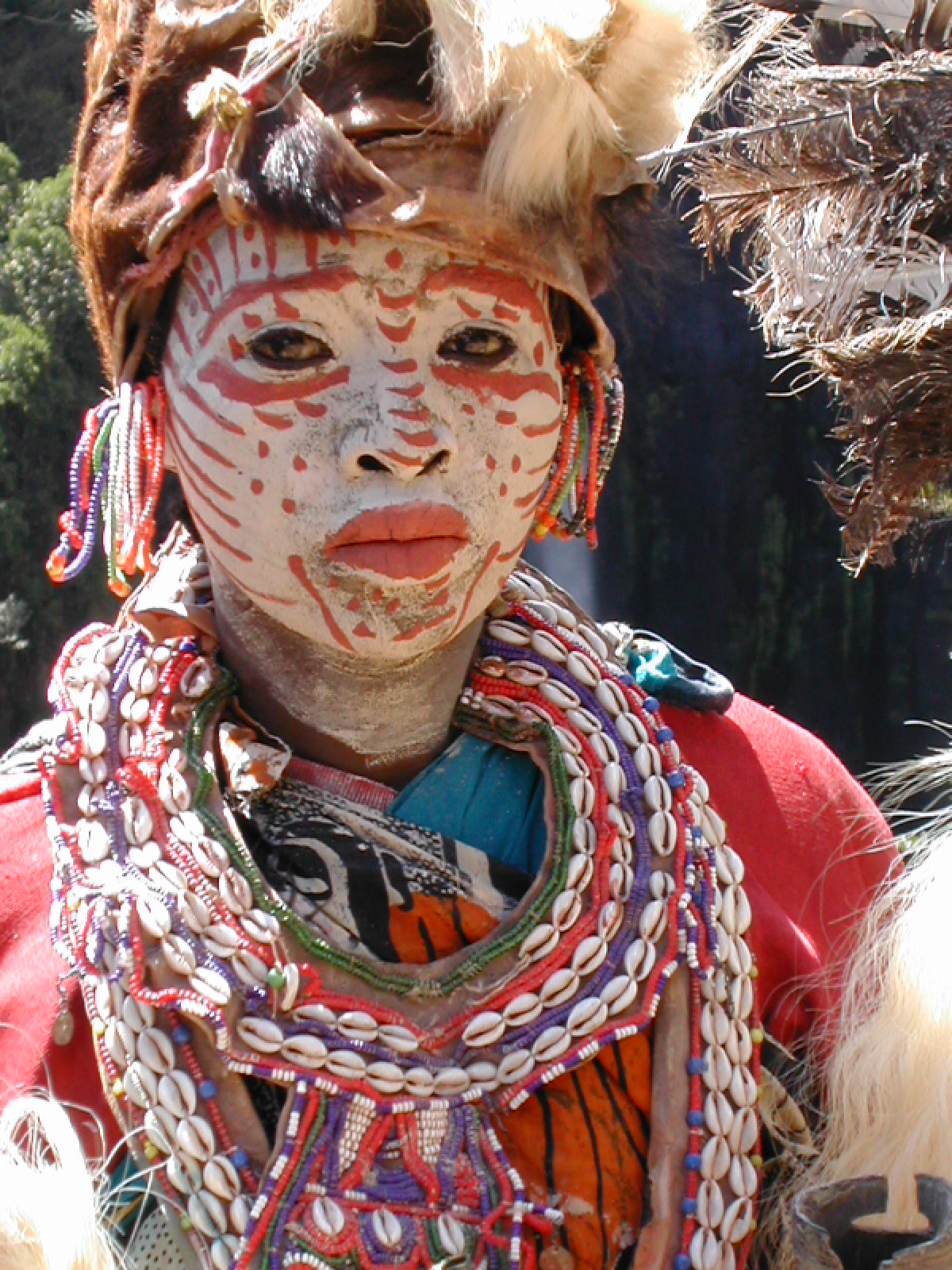
Gastropod shells, cowries, in traditional dress of the Kikuyu people of Kenya

=== Adornment ===
Seashells are admired and collected by conchologists and others for scientific purposes and for their decorative qualities.

Seashells have been used for personal adornment, such as the strings of cowries in the traditional dress of the Kikuyu people of Kenya, and the formal dress of the Pearly Kings and Queens of London.

Most molluscs with shells can produce pearls, but only the pearls of bivalves and some gastropods, whose shells are lined with nacre, are valuable. The best natural pearls are produced by marine pearl oysters, Pinctada margaritifera and Pinctada mertensi, which live in the tropical and subtropical waters of the Pacific Ocean. Natural pearls form when a small foreign object gets stuck between the mantle and shell.

Pearls for use as jewellery are cultured by inserting either "seeds" or beads into oysters. The "seed" method uses grains of ground shell from freshwater mussels, and overharvesting for this purpose has endangered several freshwater mussel species in the southeastern United States. The pearl industry is so important in some areas, significant sums of money are spent on monitoring the health of farmed molluscs.

=== Musical instruments ===
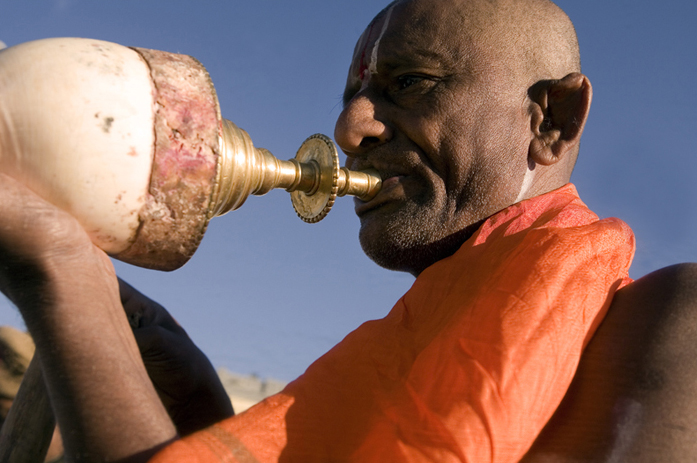
Hindu priest sounding a ritual trumpet made from the sacred chank Turbinella pyrum

Seashells including the sacred chank or shankha Turbinella pyrum; "Triton's trumpet" Charonia tritonis; and the queen conch (Aliger gigas) have been used as musical instruments around the world.

=== For craft items ===
Seashells have been made into craft items such as Sailor's Valentines in the 19th century. Souvenir items, now considered as serious art, are made by Aboriginal women from La Perouse in Sydney.

=== As food ===
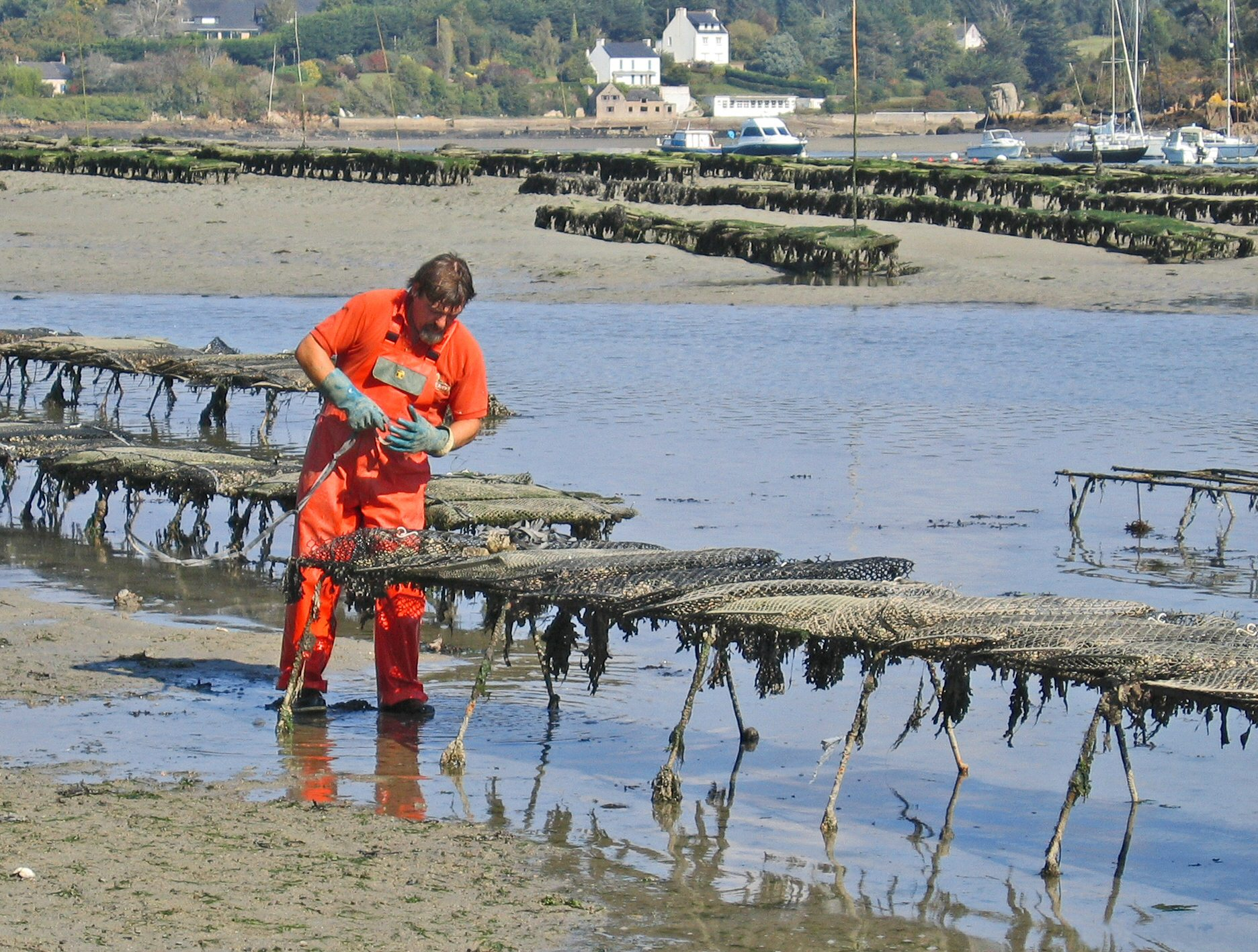
Oyster farming in Brittany

Many species of mollusc, including gastropods such as whelks, bivalves such as scallops, cockles, mussels, and clams, and cephalopods such as octopuses and squids are collected or hunted for food.

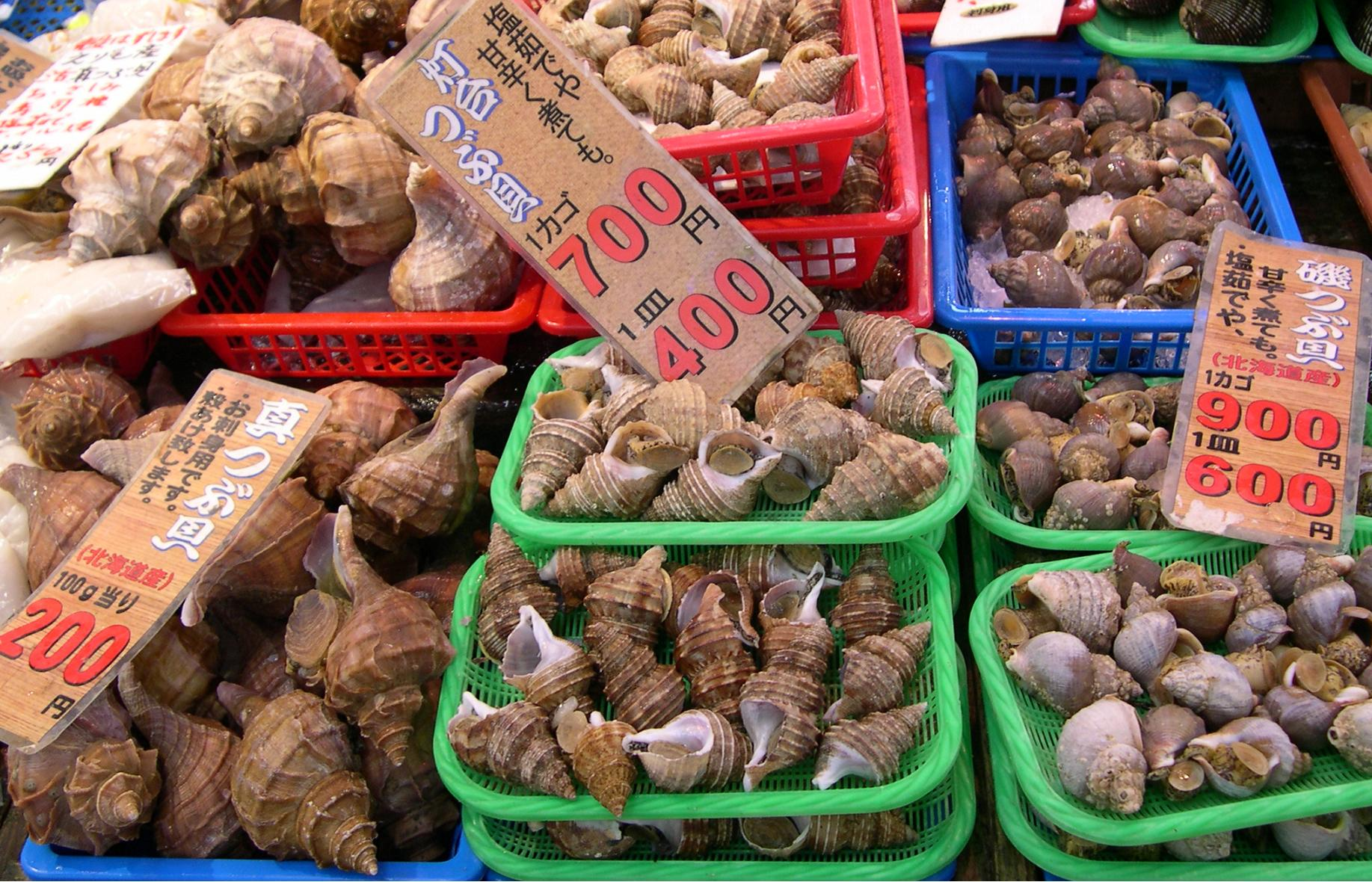
Several kinds of whelk on sale in Japan

Oysters, abalone, and several species of mussels are widely farmed; oyster farming began in Roman times.

Many recipes from around the world are based on molluscs from all three major orders. Among cephalopod recipes, both octopus and squid are used in dishes such as the popular fried calamari, and in sushi and sashimi. Among bivalve recipes, clams are made into soups called chowders, or served as a sauce with pasta in dishes such as spaghetti alle vongole, while mussels are widely eaten as moules marinieres, nowadays often with frites (chips). Gastropod recipes include escargot, terrestrial snails, in French cuisine, and whelks in cuisines around the world.

=== Imperial purple ===
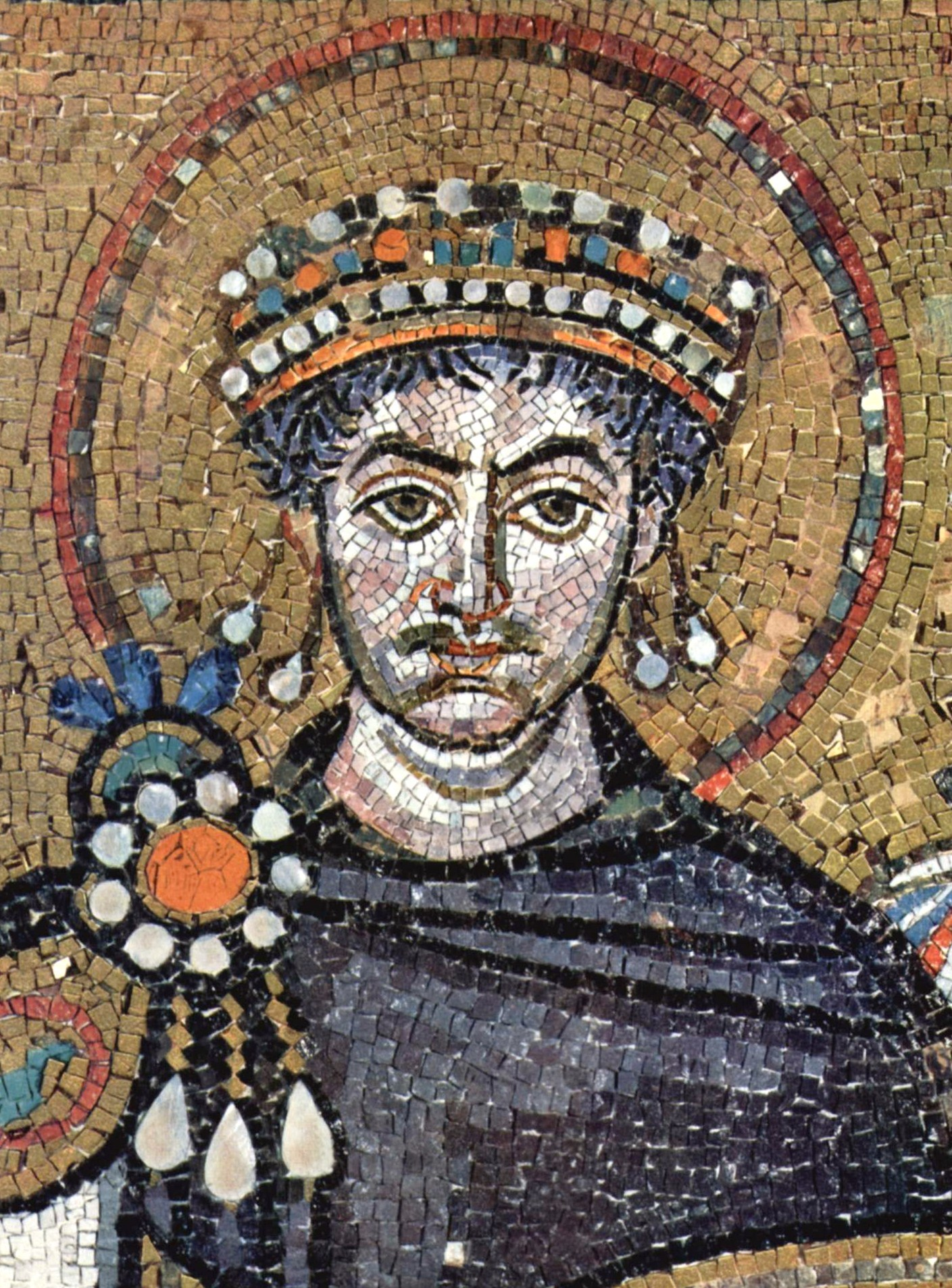
Byzantine Emperor Justinian I clad in Tyrian purple and wearing numerous pearls

Tyrian or imperial purple, made from the ink glands of murex shells, "... fetched its weight in silver" in the fourth century BC, according to Theopompus. The discovery of large numbers of Murex shells on Crete suggests the Minoans may have pioneered the extraction of "imperial purple" during the Middle Minoan period in the 20th–18th centuries BC, centuries before the Tyrians.

=== Sea silk ===
Sea silk is a fine, rare, and valuable fabric produced from the long silky threads (byssus) secreted by several bivalve molluscs, particularly Pinna nobilis, to attach themselves to the sea bed. Procopius, writing on the Persian wars circa 550 CE, "stated that the five hereditary satraps (governors) of Armenia who received their insignia from the Roman Emperor were given chlamys (or cloaks) made from lana pinna. Apparently, only the ruling classes were allowed to wear these chlamys."

=== Shell money ===
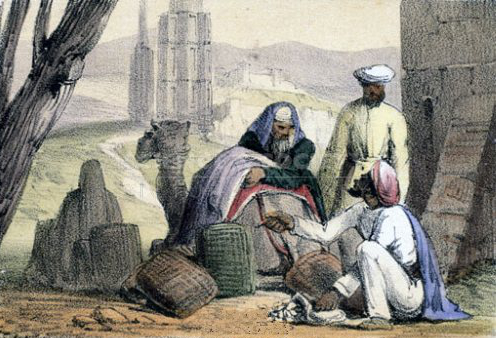
Shell money in use in an 1845 print

Peoples of the Indian Ocean, Pacific Ocean, North America, Africa and the Caribbean have used shells as money, including Monetaria moneta, the money cowrie in preindustrial societies. However, these were not necessarily used for commercial transactions, but mainly as social status displays at important occasions, such as weddings. When used for commercial transactions, they functioned as commodity money, as a tradable commodity whose value differed from place to place, often as a result of difficulties in transport, and which was vulnerable to incurable inflation if more efficient transport or "goldrush" behaviour appeared. Among the Eastern Woodlands tribes of North America, shell beads known as wampum were kept on strings and used as money.

=== Bioindicators ===
Bivalve molluscs are used as bioindicators to monitor the health of aquatic environments in both fresh water and the marine environments. Their population status and structure, physiology, behaviour and their levels of contamination with chemicals together provide a detailed indication of the status of the ecosystem. Because they are sessile, they serve as readily-monitored representatives of their environment.

== Harmful interactions ==
=== Stings and bites ===
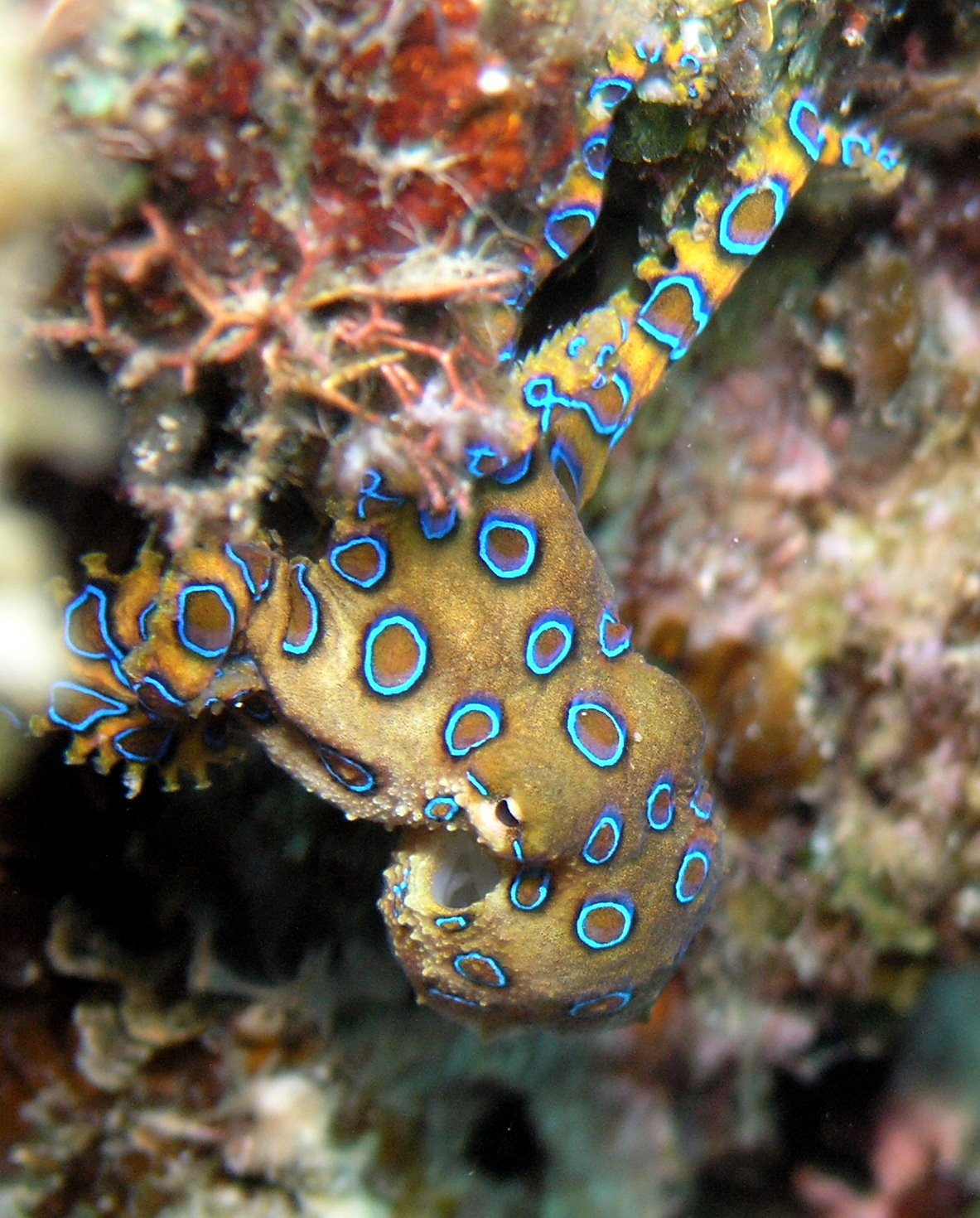
The blue-ringed octopus's rings are a warning signal; this octopus is alarmed, and its bite can kill.

A few species of molluscs, including octopuses and cone snails, can sting or bite. Some present a serious risk to people handling them. However, deaths from jellyfish stings are ten times as common as those from mollusc bites.

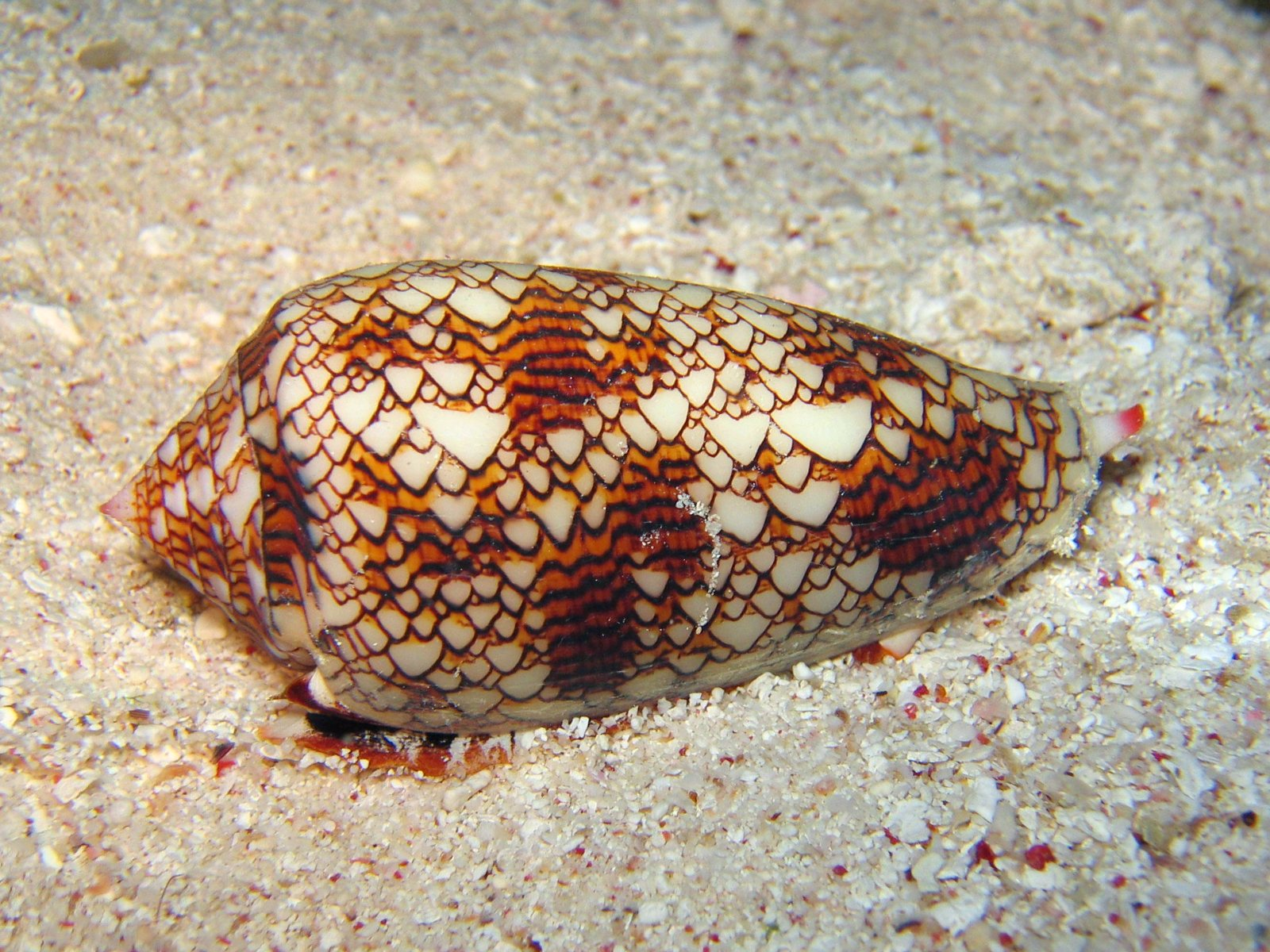
Live cone snails can be dangerous to shell collectors, but are useful to neurology researchers.

All octopuses are venomous, but only a few species pose a significant threat to humans. Blue-ringed octopuses (Hapalochlaena) from Australia and New Guinea have a powerful venom and warning coloration. They bite humans only if severely provoked, but their venom kills a quarter of the people bitten. Another tropical species, Octopus apollyon, causes severe inflammation that can last for over a month even if treated correctly. The bite of O. rubescens can cause necrosis that lasts longer than one month if untreated, and headaches and weakness persisting for up to a week even if treated.

All marine cone snails are venomous and can sting when handled. Their venom is a complex mixture of toxins, some fast-acting and others slower but deadlier. Many painful stings have been reported, and a few fatalities. Only a few larger species of cone snails are likely to be seriously dangerous to humans. The effects of individual cone-shell toxins on victims' nervous systems are so precise as to be useful tools for research in neurology, and the small size of their molecules makes it easy to synthesize them.

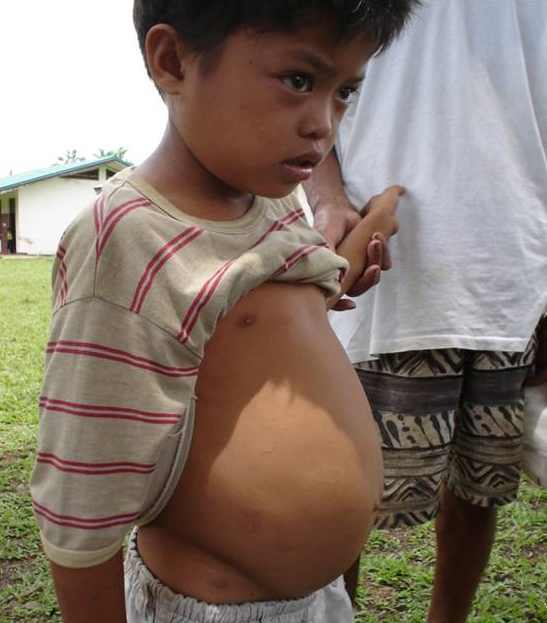
A boy with schistosomiasis, a parasitic disease hosted by freshwater gastropod molluscs

The traditional belief that giant clams can trap the leg of a person between its valves, thus causing drowning, is a myth.

=== Vectors of disease ===
Molluscs are vectors of parasitic diseases such as schistosomiasis, a major tropical disease second only to malaria. It is caused by flukes, Schistosoma spp., and infects some 200 million people in 74 countries. The flukes have a complex life cycle with freshwater snails as intermediate hosts; people swimming or washing in the water are at risk of infection. Molluscs can also carry angiostrongyliasis, a disease caused by the worms of the Angiostrongylus spp., which can occur after voluntarily or inadvertently consuming raw snails, slugs, other mollusks and even unwashed fruits and vegetables.

=== Pests ===
Some snails and slugs are serious crop pests, and in new environments can unbalance local ecosystems. One such pest, the giant African snail Lissachatina fulica, has been introduced to many parts of Asia and islands in the Indian and Pacific Oceans, reaching the West Indies in the 1990s. The predatory snail Euglandina rosea was disastrously introduced in an attempt to control it, as the predator ignored A. fulica but extirpated several native snail species instead.

== Symbolic interactions ==
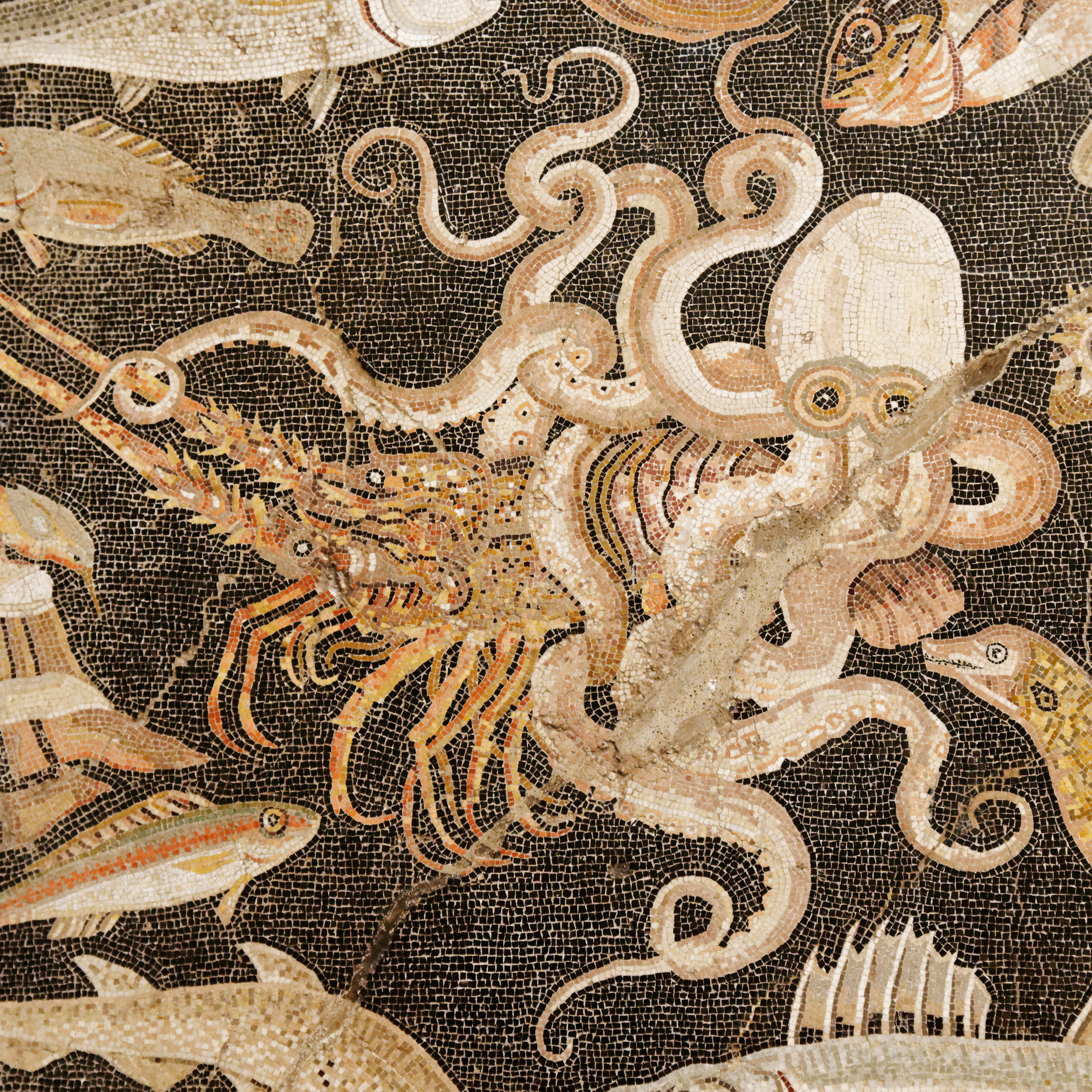
Roman mosaic from the House of the Dancing Faun, Pompeii, showing an octopus struggling with a crayfish

=== Epithets ===
The snail features in an animal epithet for its stereotypical slowness, while its shell-less relative the slug similarly denotes a person who is lazy and loathsome.

=== Monsters of the deep ===
Cephalopod molluscs including the octopus and giant squid have featured as monsters of the deep since classical times. Giant squid are described by Aristotle (4th century BC) in his History of Animals and Pliny the Elder (1st century AD) in his Natural History. The Gorgon of Greek mythology may have been inspired by the octopus or squid, the severed head of Medusa representing the animal, the beak as the protruding tongue and fangs, and its tentacles as the snakes. The six-headed sea monster of the Odyssey, Scylla, may have had a similar origin. The Nordic legend of the Kraken may also have derived from sightings of large cephalopods; the science fiction writer Jules Verne told a tale of a Kraken-like monster in his 1870 novel Twenty Thousand Leagues Under the Seas.

=== In art ===
Throughout the world, the nautilus is captured to carve the elegantly shaped shells, and for their nacreous inner shell layer, a pearl substitute. Mother-of-pearl or nacre, which lines some mollusc shells, is used to make organic jewellery. It has traditionally been inlaid into furniture and boxes, particularly in China. It has been used to decorate musical instruments, watches, pistols, fans and other products. Shells have been used in Southern Italy as a cheaper alternative to layered stone when carving cameos. In the fine art of the Italian Renaissance, Sandro Botticelli's c. 1486 The Birth of Venus depicts the goddess Venus emerging from the waves on a scallop shell. In the Dutch Golden Age, still life painters such as Adriaen Coorte often depicted ornate sea shells of varied kinds in their compositions.

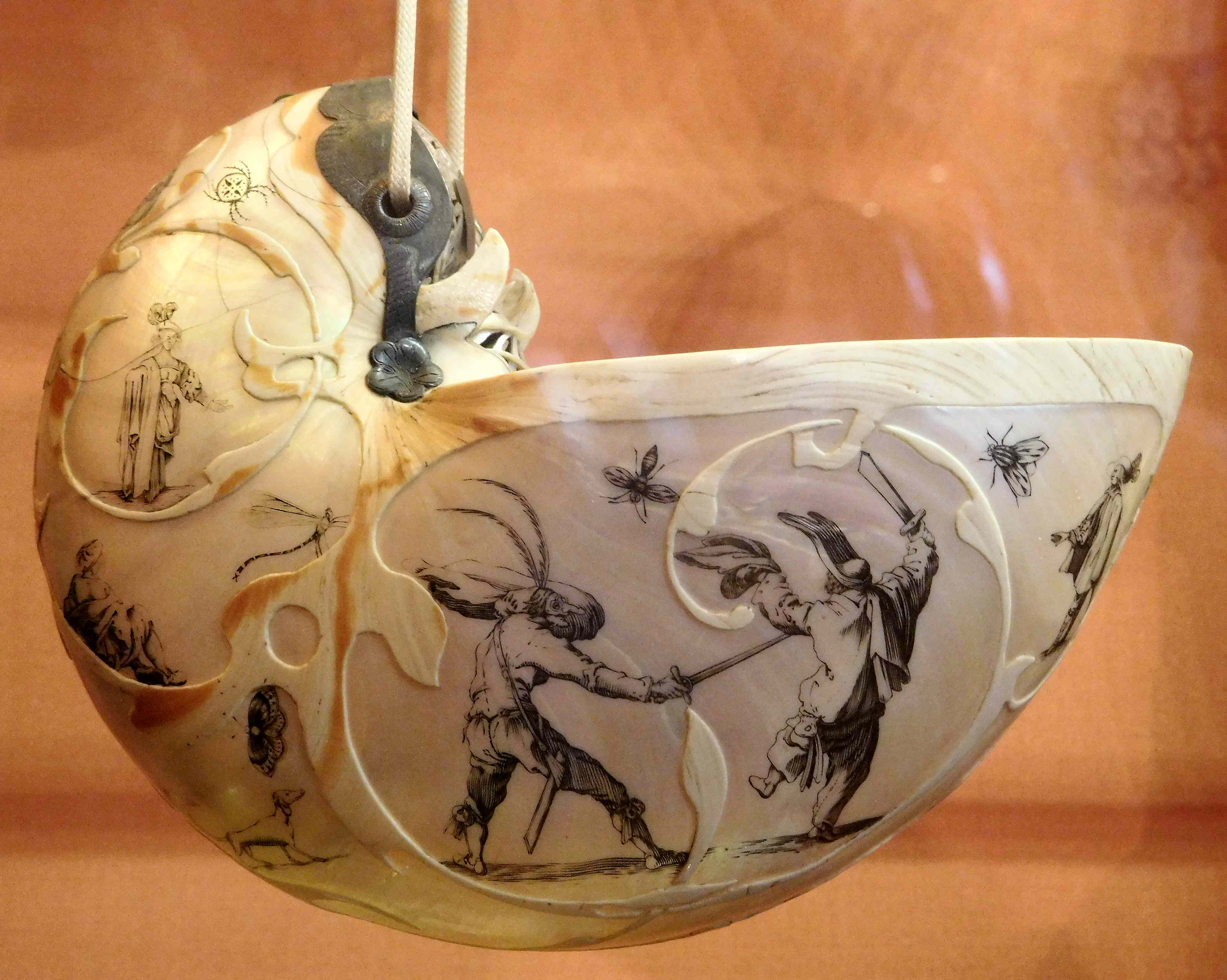
Nautilus shell carved and painted with fanciful scenes of human figures and animals

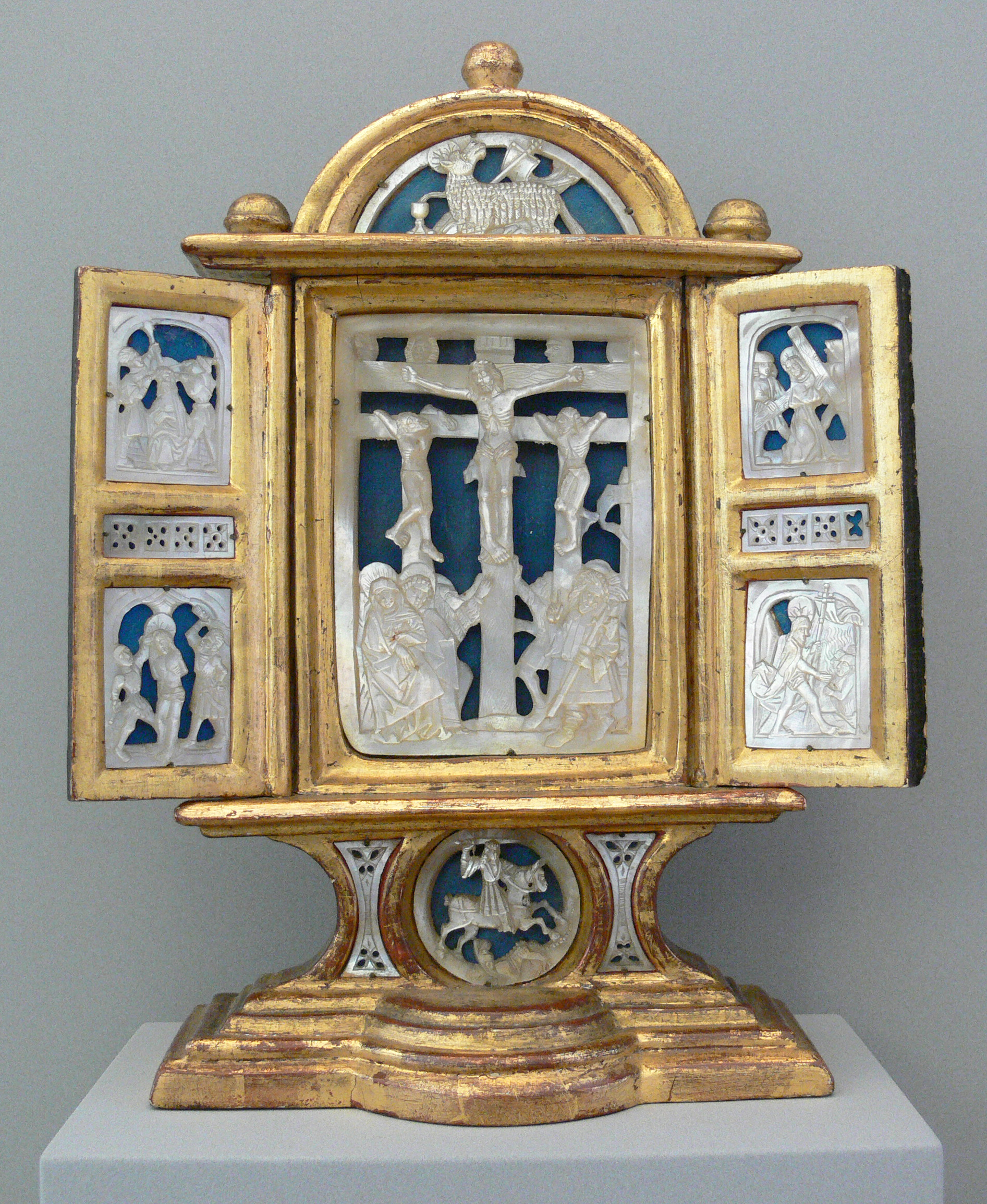
Carved nacre in a 16th-century altarpiece from Augsburg

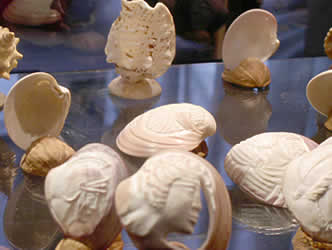
Carved seashell miniatures

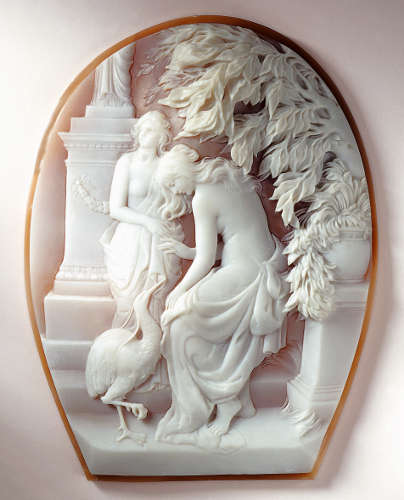
Cameo carved on shell of Cassis madagascariensis, 1925, Naples

The Birth of Venus by Sandro Botticelli, c. 1486

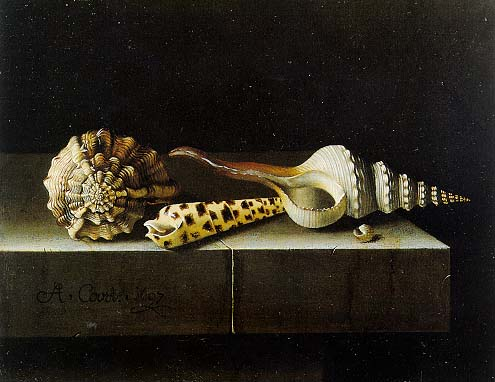
Still Life with Shells, Adriaen Coorte, 1697

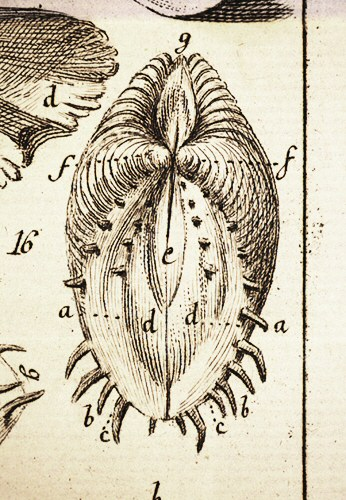
Linnaeus's drawing of "Venus dione" in his Fundamenta Testaceologiae, 1771

=== Linnaeus's Venus shell ===
In his 1758 Systema Naturae, and then in his 1771 Fundamenta Testaceologiae, the pioneering taxonomist Carl Linnaeus used a series of "disquieting[ly]" sexual terms to describe the Venus shell: vulva, anus, nates (buttocks), pubis, mons veneris, labia, hymen. Further, he named the species Venus dione, for Venus, the goddess of love, and Dione, her mother. The evolutionary biologist Stephen Jay Gould called Linnaeus's description "one of the most remarkable paragraphs in the history of systematics". Some later naturalists found the terms used by Linnaeus uncomfortable; an 1803 review commented that "a few of these terms however strongly they may be warranted by the similitudes and analogies which they express, ... are not altogether reconcilable with the delicacy proper to be observed in ordinary discourse", while the 1824 Supplement to the Encyclopædia Britannica criticised Linnaeus for "indulg[ing] in obscene allusions."

== See also ==
- Category:Molluscs in popular culture

== Sources ==
Ruppert, E. E.; Fox, R. S.; Barnes, R. D. (2004). Invertebrate Zoology (7th ed.). Brooks/Cole. ISBN 978-0-03-025982-1.
