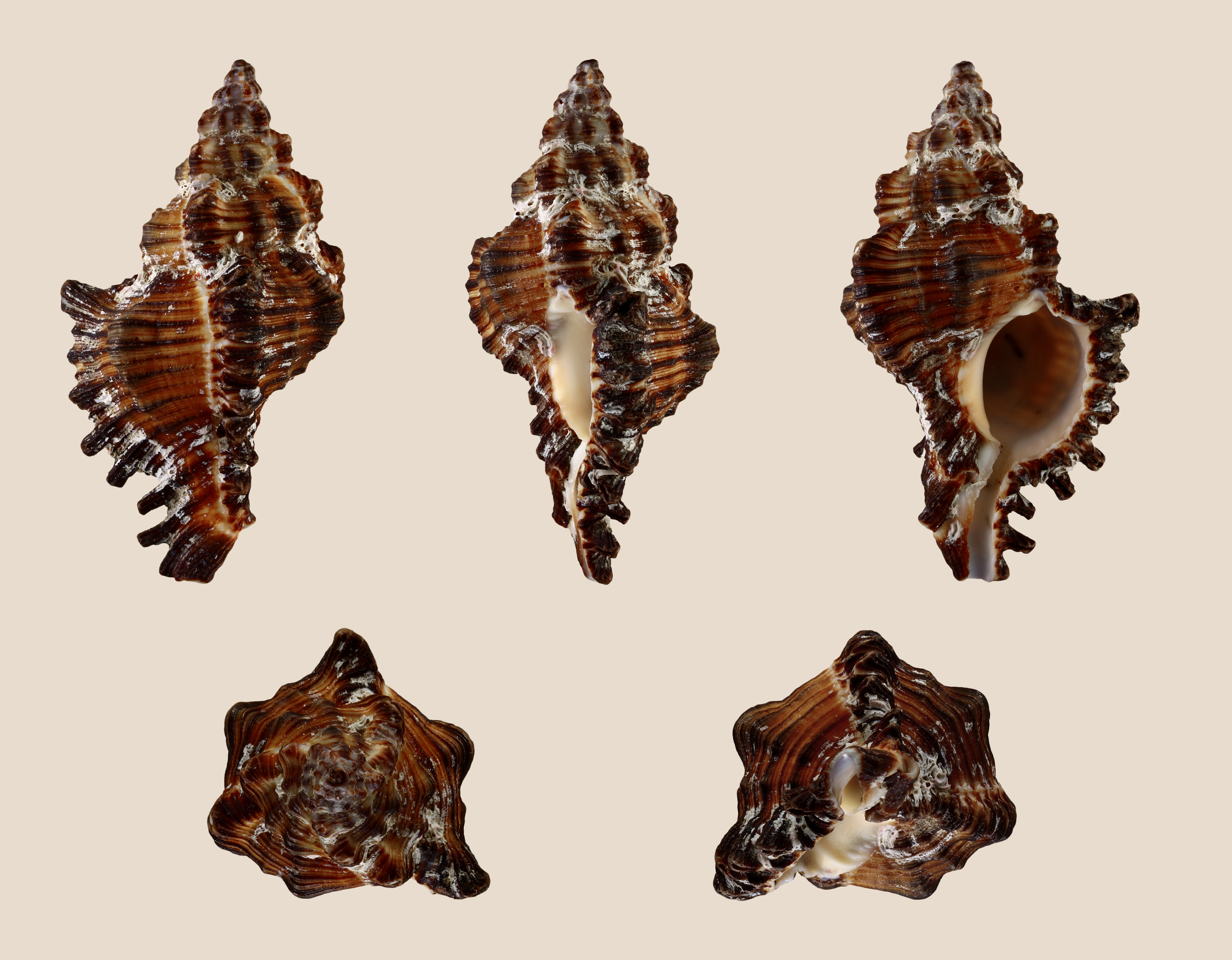

Scientific classification
- Kingdom: Animalia
- Phylum: Mollusca
- Class: Gastropoda
- Subclass: Caenogastropoda
- Order: Neogastropoda
- Family: Muricidae
- Genus: Chicoreus
- Species: C. torrefactus

Binomial name
- Chicoreus torrefactus (Sowerby, 1841)

Synonyms
- Chicoreus (Chicoreus) kilburni Houart & Pain, 1982; Chicoreus (Triplex) torrefactus (Sowerby II, 1841); Chicoreus rubiginosus (Reeve, 1845); Murex affinis Reeve, 1846; Murex benedictinus Lobbecke, 1879; Murex rochebruni Poirier, 1883; Murex rubiginosus Reeve, 1845; Murex torrefactus Sowerby, 1841; Murex tubulatus Mörch, 1852

= Chicoreus torrefactus =

Species of gastropod

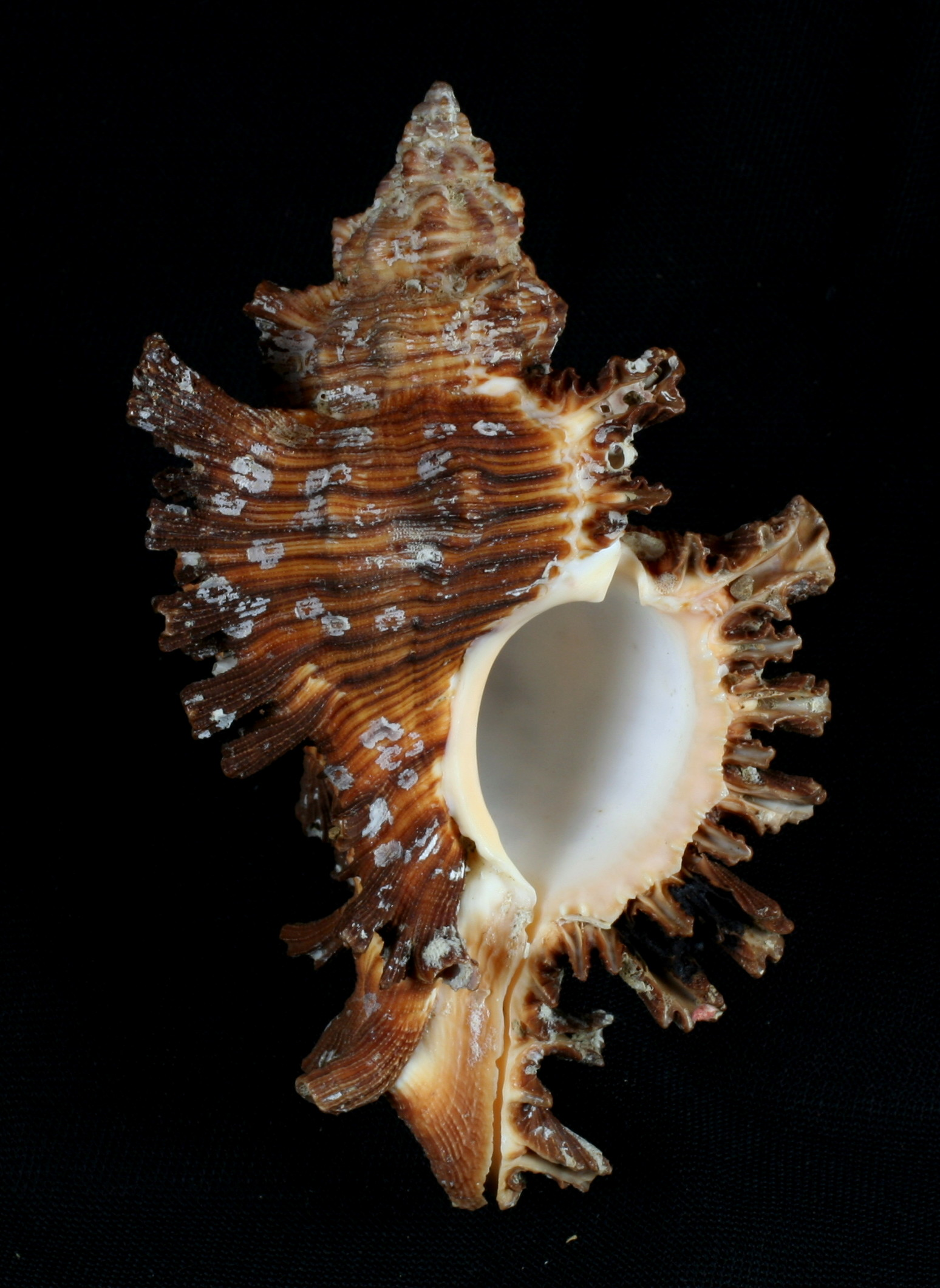
Shell of Chicoreus torrefactus (Sowerby, 1841) measuring 102.2 mm in height, found on rocks in shallow water at Minabe, in Japan.

Chicoreus torrefactus, common name the firebrand murex, is a species of sea snail, a marine gastropod mollusk in the family Muricidae, the murex snails or rock snails.

== Description ==
The size of an adult shell varies between 60 mm and 160 mm. This common species of sea snail is often used for food and shellcraft. In some localities, populations have been greatly reduced because of over collecting. The specie can also be found in shallow subtidal waters.

== Distribution ==
This species occurs in the Indian Ocean off Chagos, Madagascar, the Mascarene Basin, Tanzania and Durban, South Africa.
