= Elisabeth Bol-Smit =

Dutch artist

- Born: Elizabeth Smit; 13 February 1904; Hellevoetsluis, Netherlands
- Died: 31 May 1987 (aged 93); Dordrecht, Netherlands
- Known for: Painting
- Spouse: Laurens J. Bol

Elisabeth Bol-Smit (1904-1987) was a Dutch painter.

== Biography ==
Bol-Smit née Smit was born on 13 February 1904 in Hellevoetsluis. She studied with Karel van Veen. In 1927 she married the art historian Laurens Johannes Bol (1898-1994). Her work was included in the 1939 exhibition and sale Onze Kunst van Heden (Our Art of Today) at the Rijksmuseum in Amsterdam. She was a member of the Teekengenootschap Pictura in Dordrecht.

Bol-Smit died on 31 May 1987 in Dordrecht.
