= Jacob van Geel =

Dutch painter

- Born: c. 1585; Middelburg, Netherlands
- Died: 1638 or later Dordrecht (likely)
- Known for: Painting
- Movement: Dutch Golden Age painting

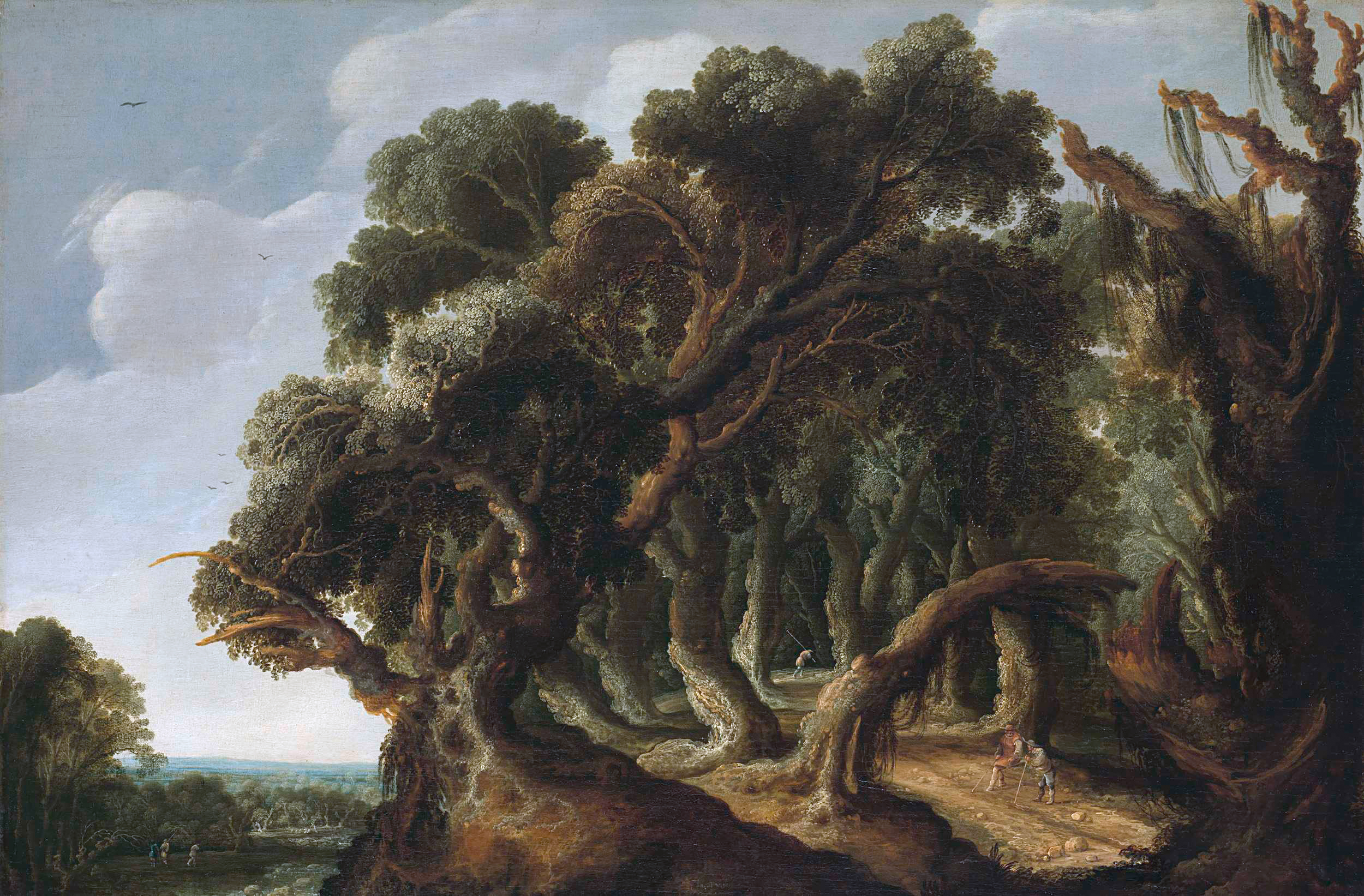
Figures in a forest landscape

Jacob van Geel (c.1585–1648) was a Dutch Golden Age painter.

== Biography ==
Van Geel was born in Middelburg. According to the RKD his birthplace and teacher are not known. He is first recorded at Middelburg in 1615 when he became a member of the committee of the Guild of St. Luke there. He is traceable there until 1625. In 1626 he is recorded in Delft, where he joined the guild there in 1627 and where in 1628 he declared he was 43 years old. Pestered by his creditors he moved after the death of his wife to Dordrecht where in late 1634 he joined the guild. He died in Dordrecht. A monograph was published by Laurens J. Bol recording 22 works, supplemented with 7 more works described by Bol in his book Goede Onbekenden. He is known for landscapes and architectural studies.
