= Laurens J. Bol =

Dutch art historian (1898-1994)

Laurens Johannes Bol (23 January 1898, in Ooltgensplaat – 11 April 1994, in Dordrecht) was a Dutch art historian who specialized in Dutch Golden Age painting. He played a leading role in the twentieth-century rediscovery of several overlooked seventeenth-century artists, including Adriaen Coorte, Johannes Torrentius, and Pieter de Hooch, through his scholarship, exhibitions, and catalogues raisonnés.

== Biography ==
He was a teacher in Goeree-Overflakkee. He later moved to Middelburg in 1920, where he started researching artists in the local archives. In 1927 he married the painter Elizabeth Smit (1898-1994). He became an expert on Dutch masters from Middelburg and is credited with the "discovery" of Adriaen Coorte.

Thanks to his work in Middelburg, valuable material was rescued for later generations. The Middelburg archives went up in flames during World War II. The research that Bol did on Coorte, Ambrosius Bosschaert, Balthasar van der Ast and Jacob van Geel (ca. 1585–1638), saved them from obscurity.

He became a regular visitor of the Rijksbureau voor Kunsthistorische Documentatie, and was particularly interested in less popular Dutch masters. He wrote his first article in Oud Holland in 1949. In his thirty years as a resident of Middelburg, he wrote regularly for the NRC and Openbaar Kunstbezit. He published books on lesser-known artists.

Between 1949–1965 Laurence Bol was director of the Dordrechts Museum. Although the museum had very little funding Bol made some exquisite exhibitions in his time. The museum became known for its collection of less well known artists.

== Awards and honours ==
- 1959 Buchelius Prize for his contribution to art history
- 1962 Knight in the Order of Orange-Nassau
- 1965 Medal of honour of the Koningklijk Oudheidkunig Genootschap Amsterdam
- 1974 Officer in the Order of Orange-Nassau

== Publications ==
- The Bosschaert dynasty: Painters of flowers and fruit, F.Lewis, 1960
- Jan van Eyck (Art series; no.23), Blandford P, 1965
- Die holländische Marinemalerei des 17. Jahrhunderts., Braunschweig, 1973
- Bol, Laurens Johannes (1977). Adriaen Coorte: a unique late seventeenth century Dutch still-life painter. Van Gorcum Ltd. ISBN 90-232-1516-8.
- Bol, Laurens Johannes; Keyes, George S.; Butôt, F. C. (1981). Netherlandish paintings and drawings from the collection of F.C. Butôt: by little-known and rare masters of the seventeenth century. Sotheby Parke Bernet Publication. ISBN 0-85667-103-7.
- Bol, Laurens Johannes (1982). 'Goede onbekenden': hedendaagse herkenning en waardering van verscholen, voorbijgezien en onderschat talent. ISBN 978-90-6522-005-9.
- Bol, Laurens Johannes; van de Venne, Adriaen Pietersz. (1989). Adriaen Pietersz. van de Venne: painter and draughtsman. Davaco. ISBN 90-70288-54-0.
- Bol, Laurens Johannes (1991). Aart Schouman: ingenious painter and draughtsman. Davaco. ISBN 978-90-70288-73-0.
