= Sailor's valentine =

19th-century piece of shellcraft

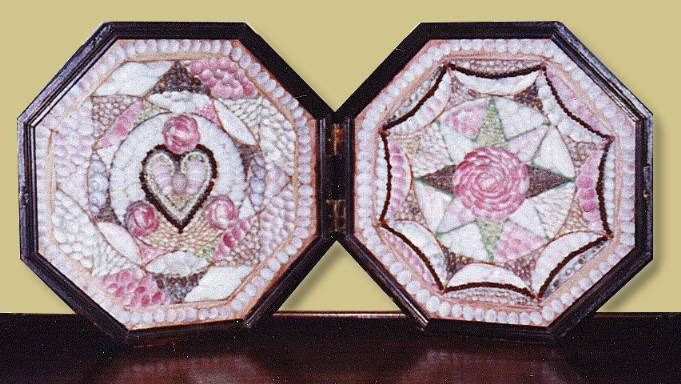
A sailors' valentine from circa 1870

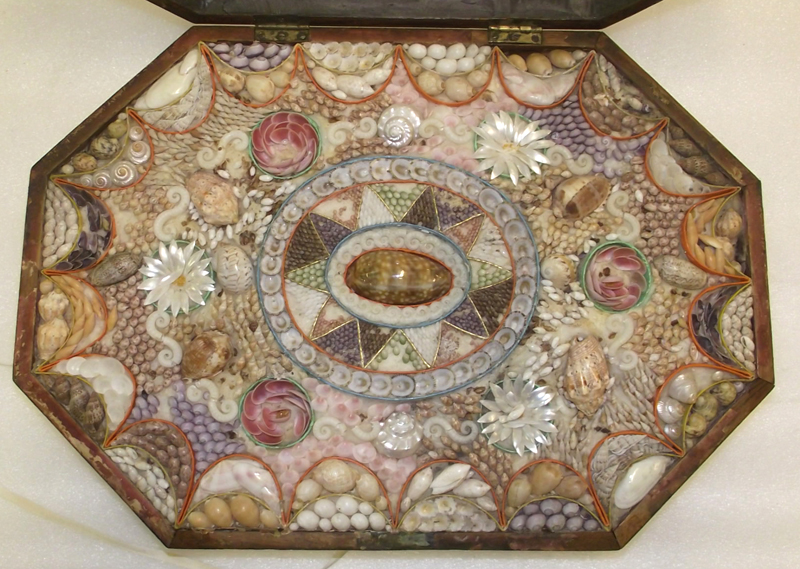
A sailor's valentine in the collection of the Mariners Museum.

A sailor's valentine is a form of shellcraft, a type of mostly antique souvenir, or sentimental gift made using large numbers of small seashells. Sailor's valentines are typically octagonal, glass-fronted, hinged wooden boxes ranging from 8 to 20 inches (20 to 51 cm) in width, displaying intricate symmetrical designs composed entirely of small sea shells of various colors glued onto a backing. Patterns often feature a centerpiece such as a compass rose or a heart design, hence the name, and in some cases the small shells are used to spell out a motto or sentimental message, such as "Forget Me Not" or "Home Again." The octagonal wooden boxes were often made from Cerdrella (Spanish cedar).

== History ==
These were originally made between 1830 and 1890, and they were designed to be brought home from a sailor's voyage at sea and given to the sailor's loved one or loved ones. Although the name seems to suggest that the sailors themselves made these objects, a large number of them originated on the island of Barbados, which was an important seaport during this period. Historians believe that the women on Barbados made the valentines using local shells, or in some cases, using shells imported from Indonesia, and then the finished products were sold to the sailors. The art form represents a fusion of European and West African scientific and spiritual, aesthetic, and cultural practices of shell collection and display.

In his book Sailors' Valentines, John Fondas concludes that the primary source for sailor's valentines was the New Curiosity Shop, located in McGregor Street, Bridgetown, Barbados, a popular shop where sailors would purchase souvenirs. The shop was owned by the English brothers B.H. and George Belgrave. The Belgraves organised local women to create the designs using indigenous shells and seeds.

Fondas recounts that while an antique sailor's valentine was being repaired and reconstructed, pieces of a Barbados newspaper were found inside the backing material.

Many sailor's valentines, both new and old, can be found on Nantucket, Massachusetts. They were also imported to Newfoundland: a chef on a fishing schooner is reported to have brought a sailor’s valentine home to Carbonear from Barbados in the late 1800s. They were popular souvenirs between 1852 and 1920, but by the late 19th century, sailor's valentines fell out of fashion and faded into obscurity until being rediscovered as a folk art form in the 1930s.

Today, antique sailor's valentines can be found as part of museum collections and are also valued as collectibles because of their beauty and unusual qualities. Collector interest has sparked a resurgence in sailor's valentines as an art form; shell kits and patterns are now sold at craft shops.

== See also ==
- Scrimshaw
