= Shellcraft =

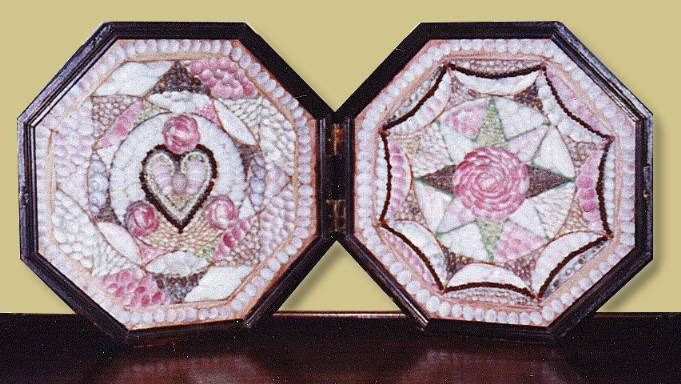
A sailor's valentine from circa 1870

Shellcraft, also known as shell craft and shellwork, is the art and craft of making decorative objects, and of decorating surfaces, using seashells. It is a form of folk art and decorative art. The craft includes the design and creation of small items such as shell jewelry and figurines made from shells; middle-sized objects such as boxes and mirror frames covered in shells; sailor's valentines; and larger constructions including mosaics and shell grottos.

Some shellcraft is done as a hobby for enjoyment and making gifts. Among Aboriginal Australian and Torres Strait Islander communities, shellwork is an important traditional art, including Bidjigal shellwork. Pieces are held in art galleries and museum collections. In some parts of the world, including the Philippines, it is a business.
