= Adriaen Coorte =

Dutch painter

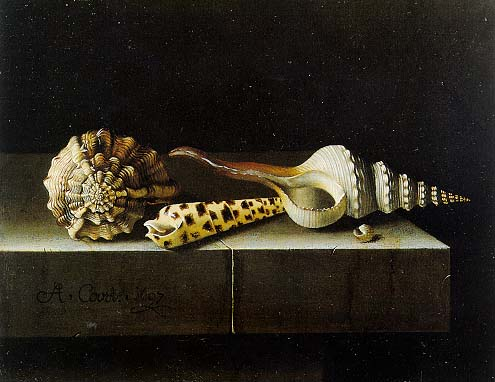
Still Life with Shells (1697)

Adriaen Coorte (c. 1665 – after 1707) was a Dutch Golden Age painter of still lifes.

He signed paintings between 1683 and 1707 and became known for small, restrained arrangements of fruit, vegetables, shells, and other objects placed on stone ledges against dark backgrounds.

His work continued an intimate form of still-life painting associated with the earlier seventeenth century, and he has been described as “one of the last practitioners of this intimate category”.

== Biography ==
Very little is known about Coorte’s life. He is generally believed to have been born in or near Middelburg and to have worked there for much of his career.

Around 1680, he became a pupil of Melchior d'Hondecoeter in Amsterdam. Hondecoeter frequently repeated particular birds and poses across his compositions, and similar motifs appear in Coorte’s early paintings. Coorte’s Pelican and Ducks in a Mountain Landscape, for example, includes a pelican closely related to one in Hondecoeter’s The Floating Feather. Comparable hoopoe motifs also occur in paintings by both artists.

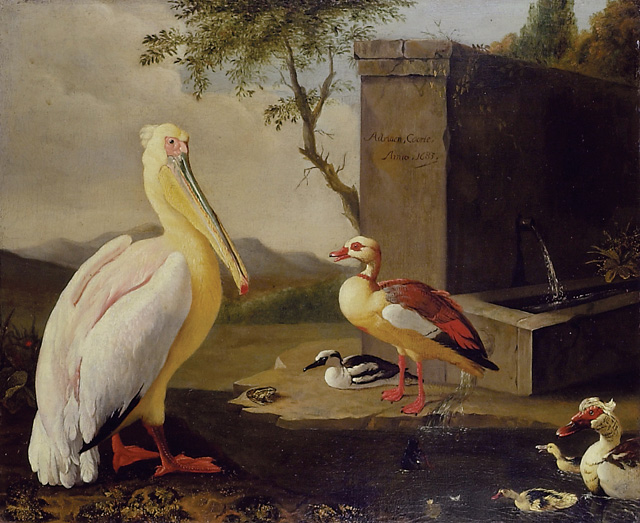
Pelican and Ducks in a Mountain Landscape, an early work associated with Coorte’s training under Melchior d’Hondecoeter

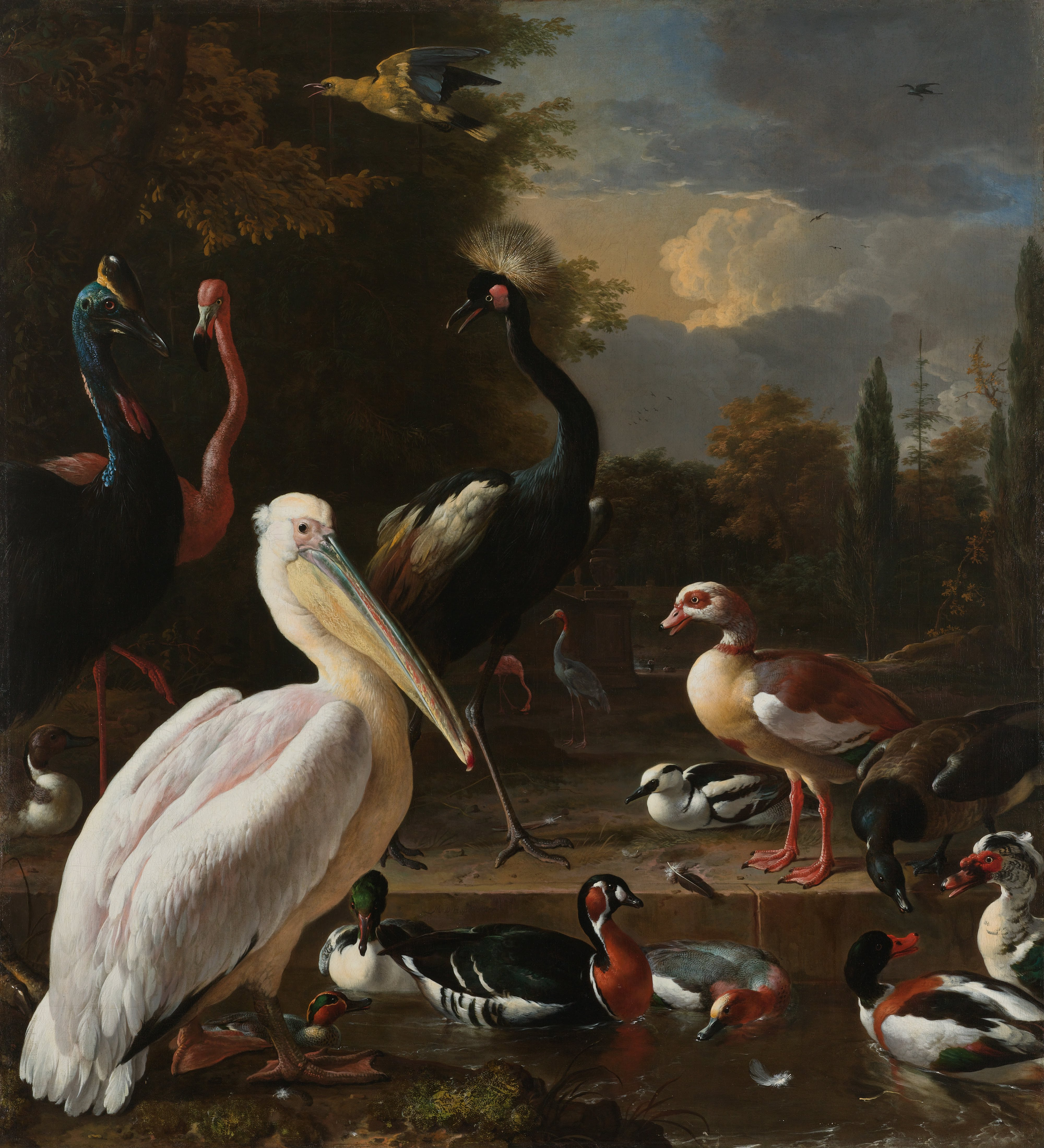
The Floating Feather by Melchior d’Hondecoeter, including a pelican also found in Coorte’s work

By 1683, Coorte appears to have returned to Middelburg, where he established a workshop and began signing the small still lifes for which he became known. Archival evidence records his activity in Middelburg from 1695, when he was fined for selling a painting before becoming a member of the local Guild of Saint Luke. His works also appear in contemporary Middelburg inventories.

Neither his date of birth nor his date of death is securely documented.

== Style and technique ==
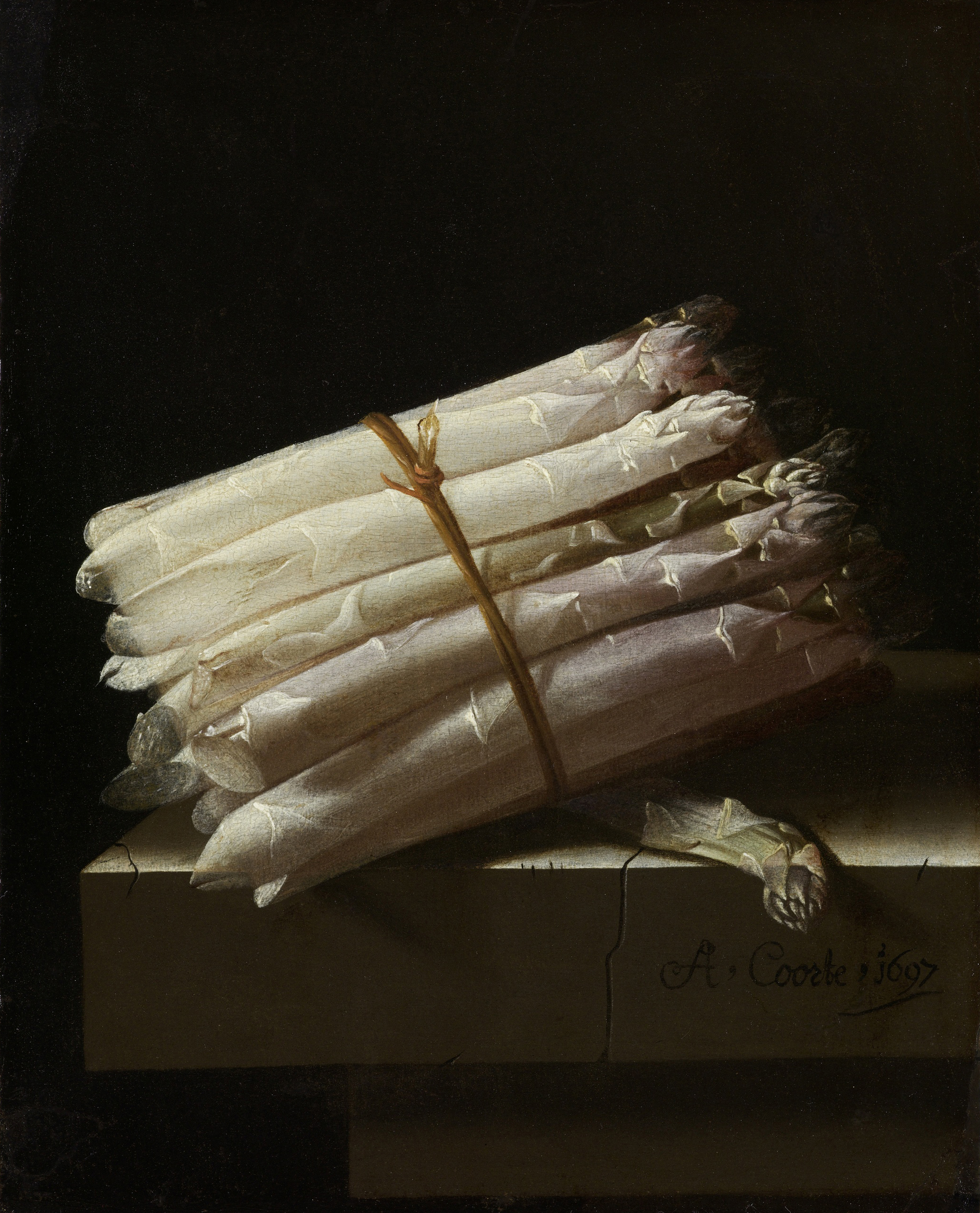
Still Life with Asparagus (1697), Rijksmuseum

Around eighty signed works by Coorte have been catalogued. Most present a small group of fruits, vegetables, shells, nuts, or other objects arranged on a stone ledge and illuminated from above. The surrounding darkness isolates each object and heightens the effects of light, surface, and texture.

Coorte often painted in oil on paper, which was subsequently mounted on a wooden panel. His compositions usually avoid the elaborate silver vessels, imported porcelain, and rich textiles found in many contemporary Dutch still lifes. Instead, he used simple earthenware containers and modest foods such as asparagus, gooseberries, strawberries, medlars, peaches, and currants. According to Seymour Slive, “objects and light are studied intensely, and are painted with a wondrous tenderness”.

His work has sometimes been compared with Spanish bodegones, particularly the restrained still lifes of Juan Sánchez Cotán and Francisco de Zurbarán. Both traditions employ isolated objects, dark backgrounds, concentrated lighting, and a strong sense of spatial stillness. Coorte’s paintings also recall earlier forms of trompe-l'œil and ancient wall painting, although a direct line of influence has yet to be established.

== Rediscovery and exhibitions ==
Coorte appears to have remained little known outside Middelburg during his lifetime. His reputation faded almost entirely after his death.

The Dutch art historian Laurens J. Bol initiated the modern reassessment of Coorte with an article published in 1952. Bol later organized an exhibition of thirty-five paintings at the Dordrechts Museum in 1958 and published the first monograph and catalogue raisonné devoted to the artist in 1977. The 1958 exhibition attracted considerable attention in the Netherlands and inspired poets including Hans Faverey and Ed Leeflang.

The National Gallery of Art in Washington, D.C., presented an exhibition devoted to Coorte in 2003. A travelling exhibition titled Ode to Coorte followed in 2008 and further established him as one of the most prominent rediscovered painters of the Dutch Baroque period.

== Art market ==
Two newly discovered paintings by Coorte were sold on 1 December 2009, each achieving a price exceeding its pre-sale estimate.

A new auction record for Coorte was established at Sotheby's on 3 December 2014, when Three Peaches on a Stone Ledge with a Red Admiral Butterfly sold for £3,444,500.

== Gallery ==
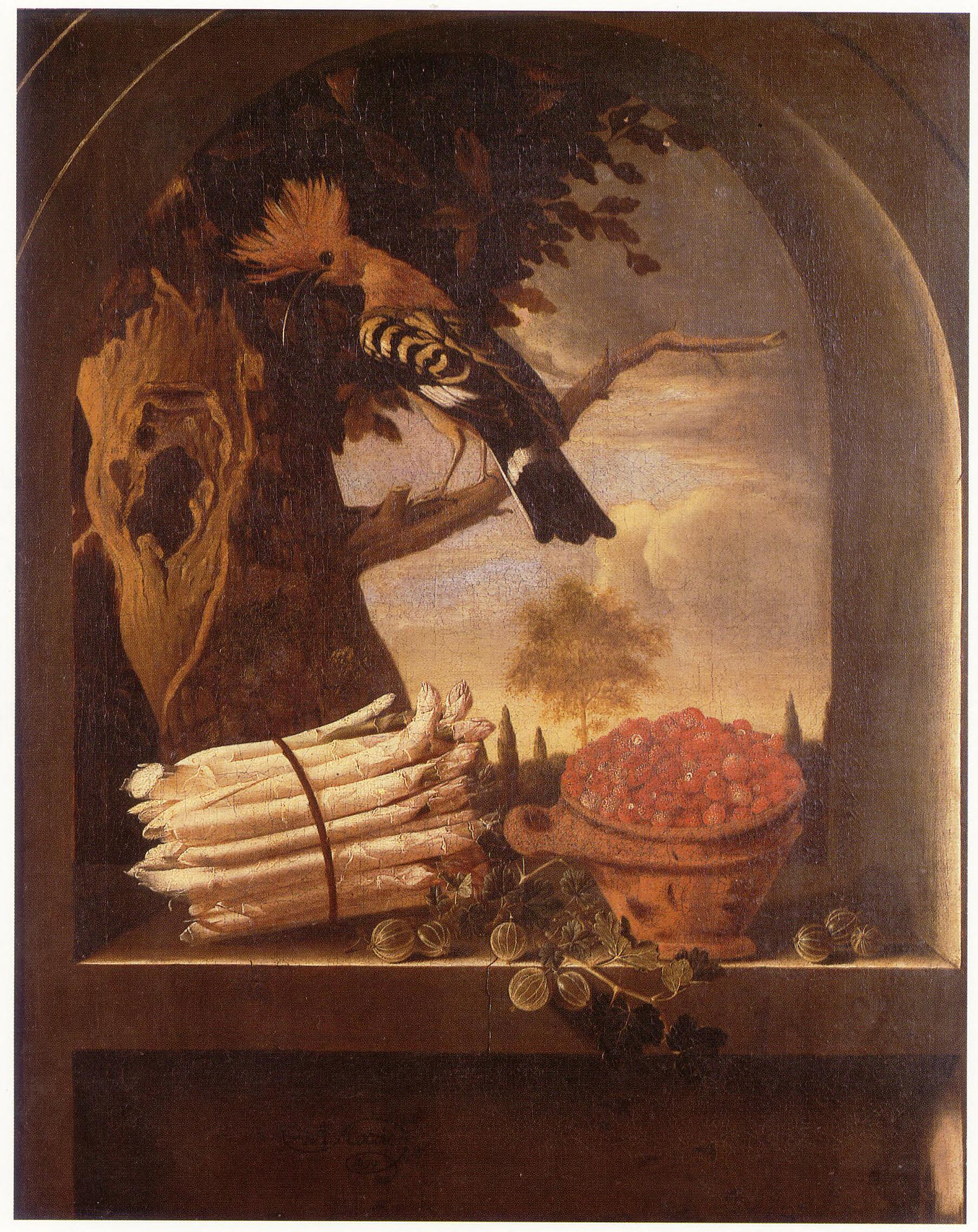
Asparagus, Gooseberries and Strawberries in a Window, with a View of a Bird in a Tree

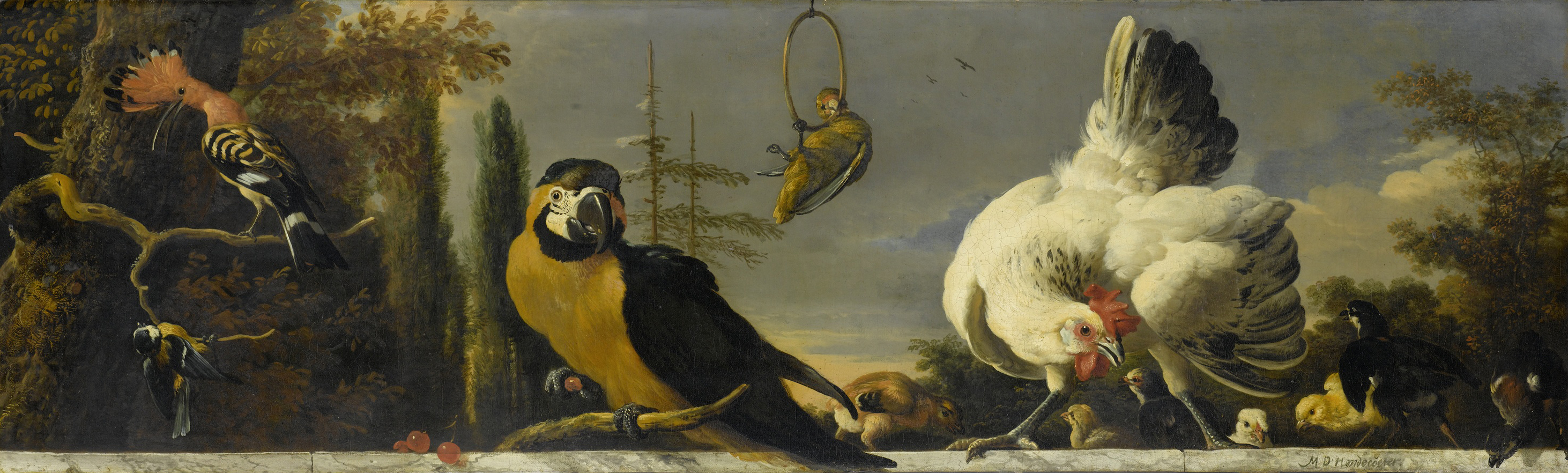
A hoopoe in a painting by Melchior d’Hondecoeter

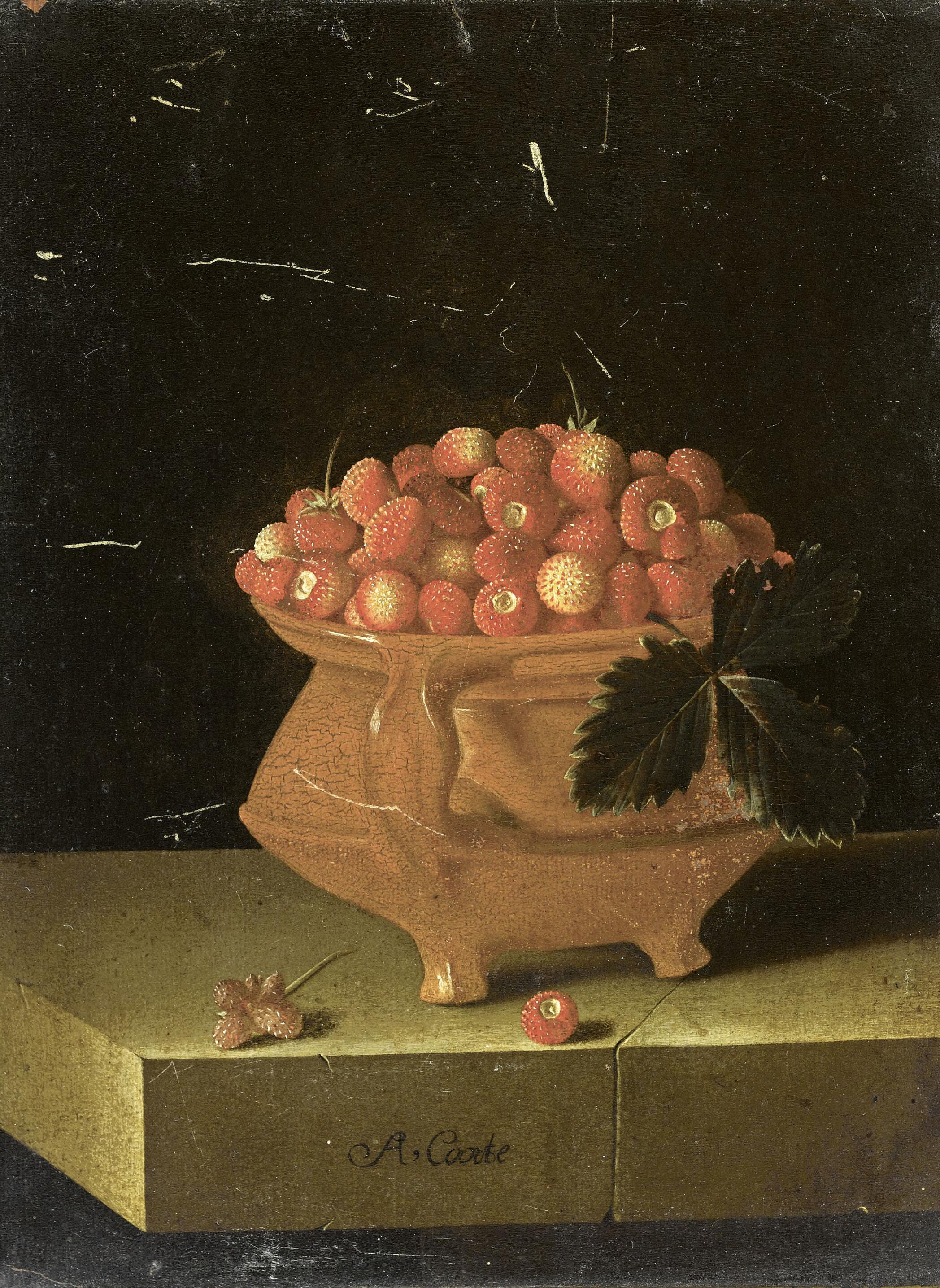
Strawberries in a Stone Jar

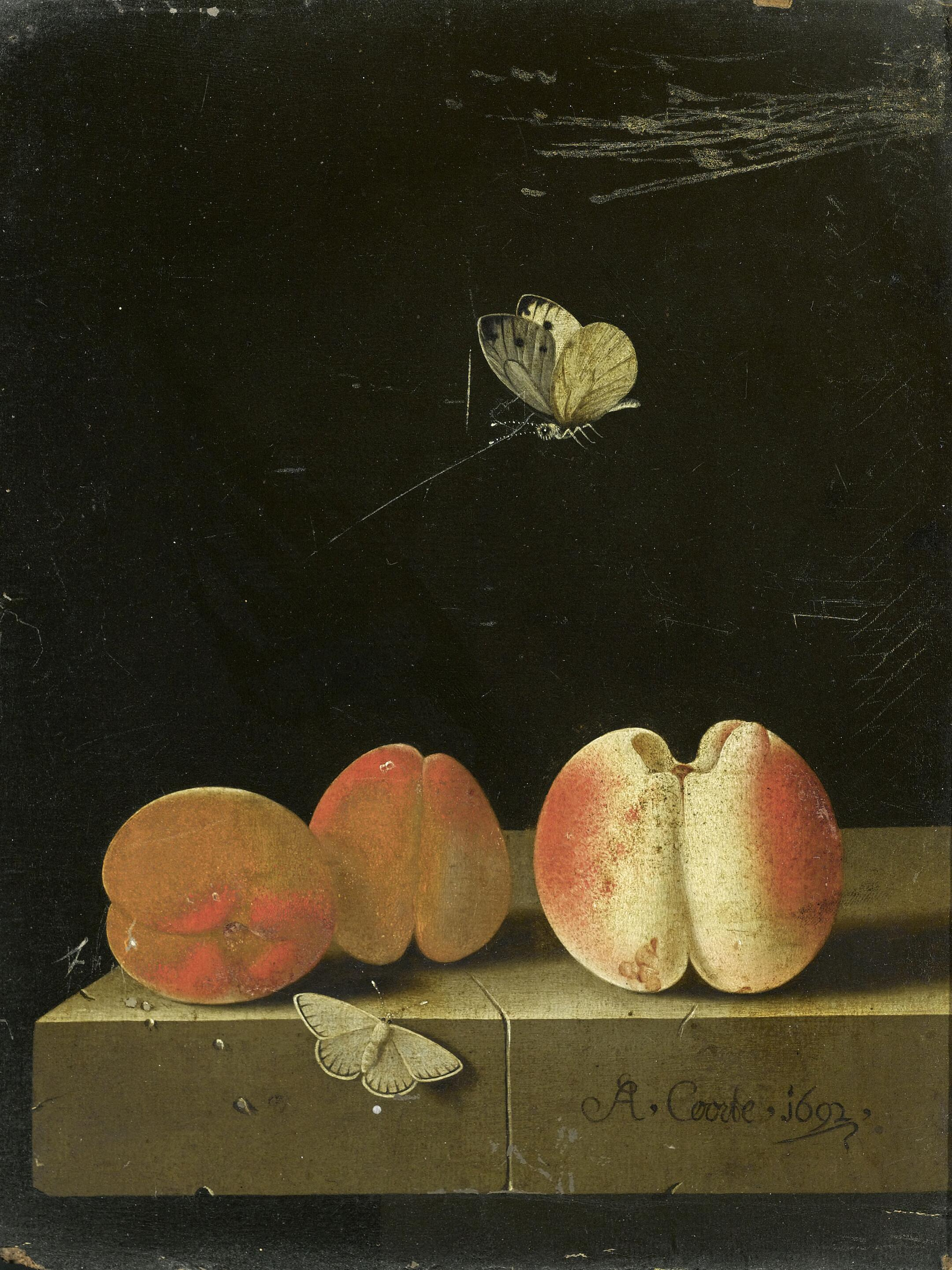
Still Life with a Peach and Two Apricots

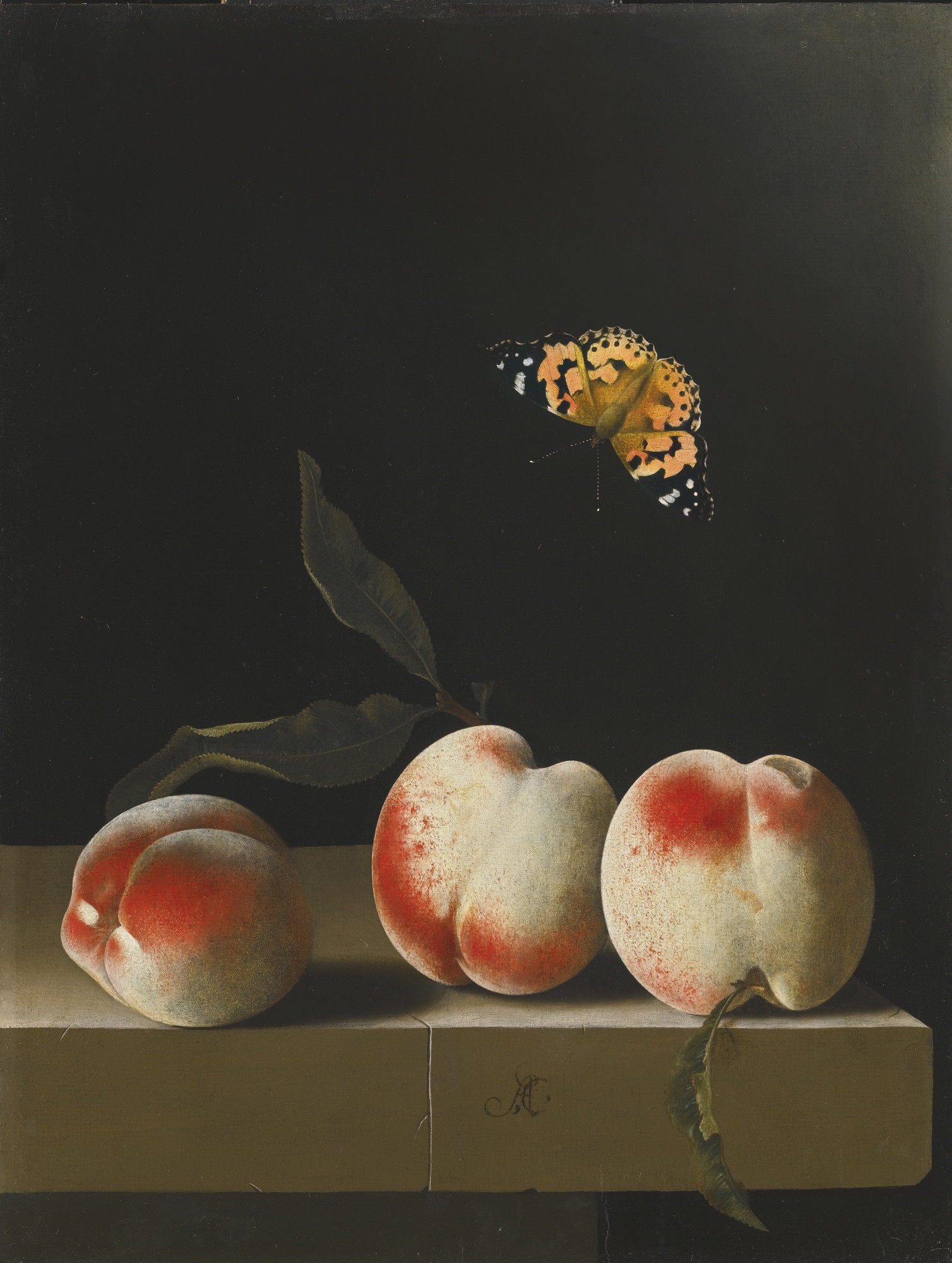
Three Peaches on a Stone Ledge with a Painted Lady Butterfly

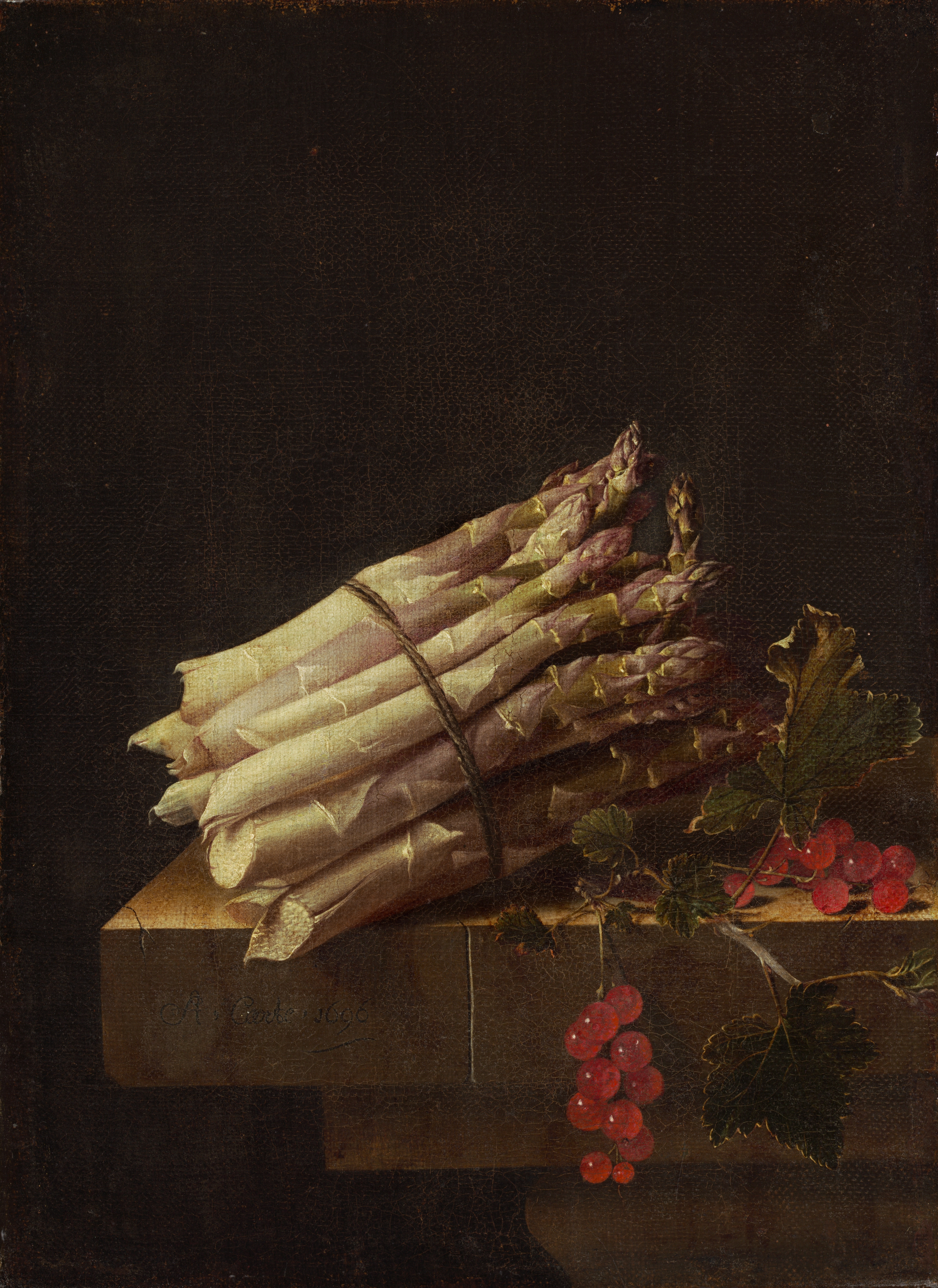
Still Life with Asparagus and Red Currants (1696)

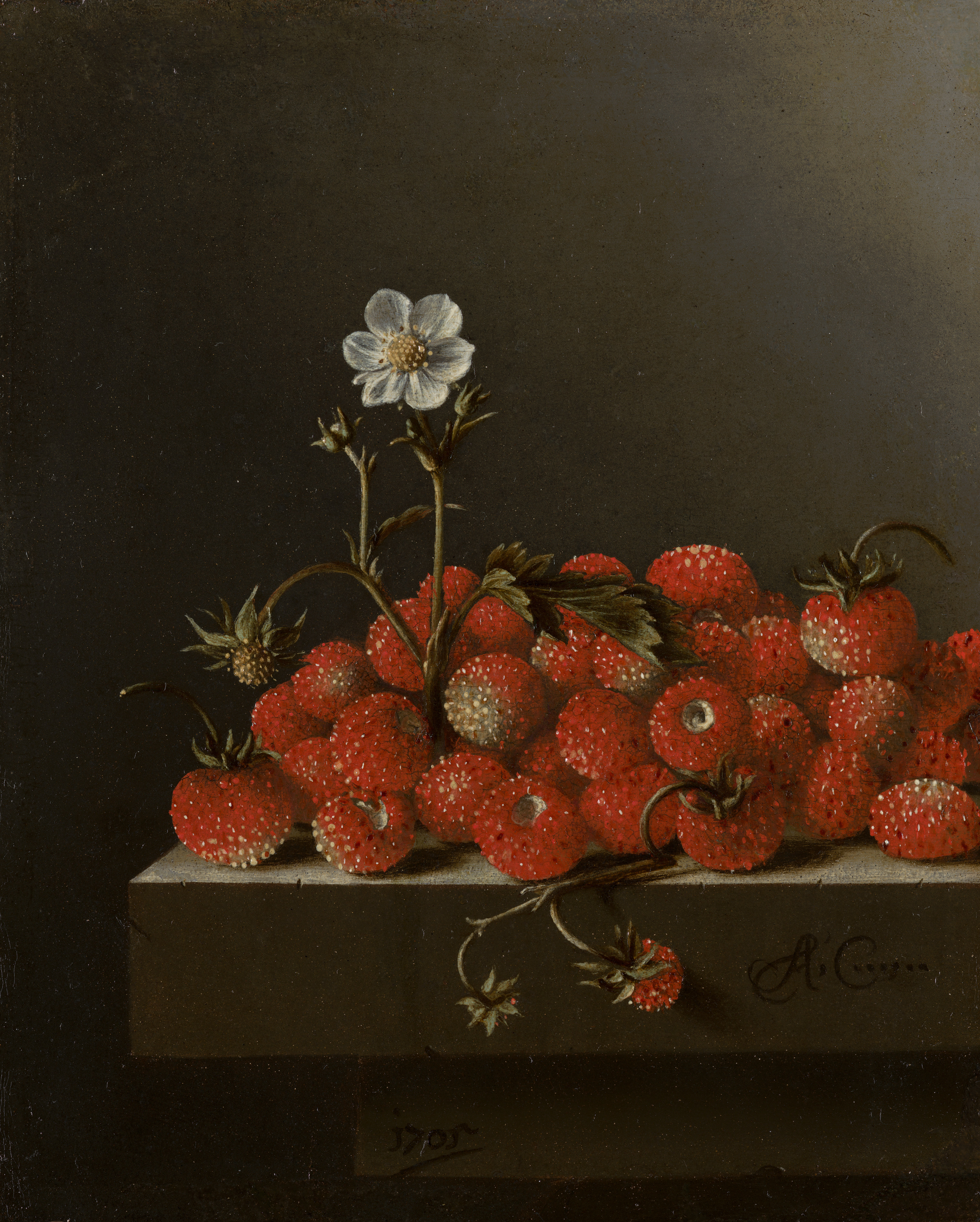
Still Life with Wild Strawberries (1696), Mauritshuis

Asparagus with Strawberries and Gooseberries (1698), Dordrechts Museum

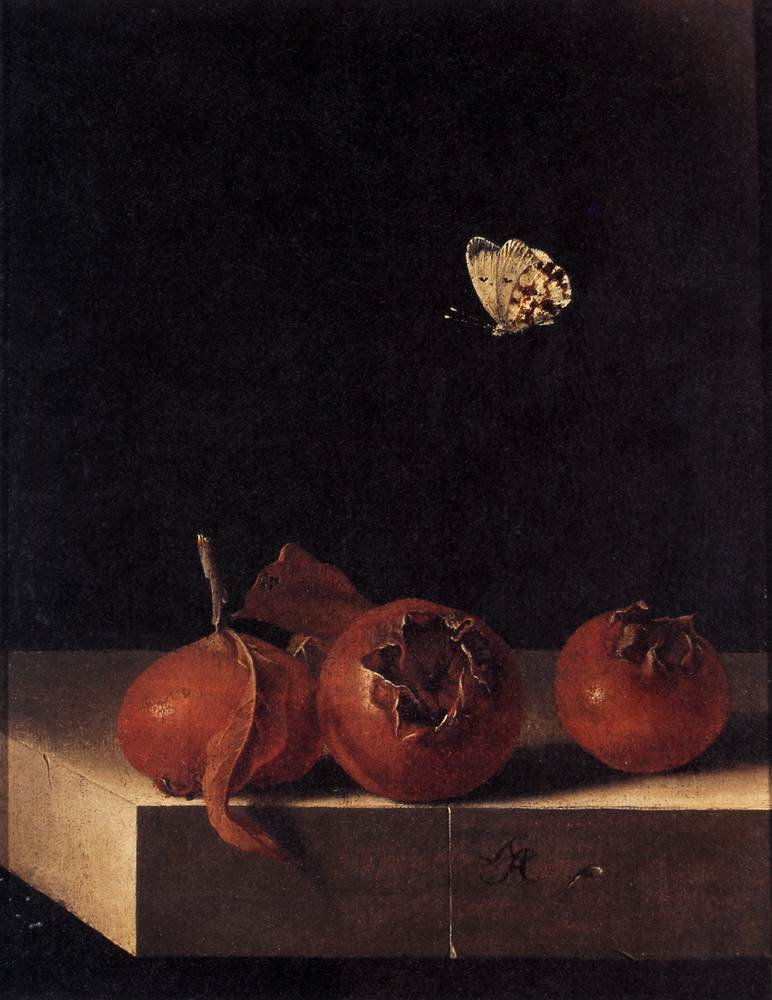
Still Life with Three Medlars (1705)
