= Made en Drimmelen =

Coordinates: 51.694906°N 4.798965°E

Made en Drimmelen was a municipality in the Dutch province of North Brabant. It included the villages Drimmelen and Made.

The municipality existed until 1997, when it merged with Hooge en Lage Zwaluwe and Terheijde, to form the new municipality "Made".
