= Hooge Zwaluwe =

- Village
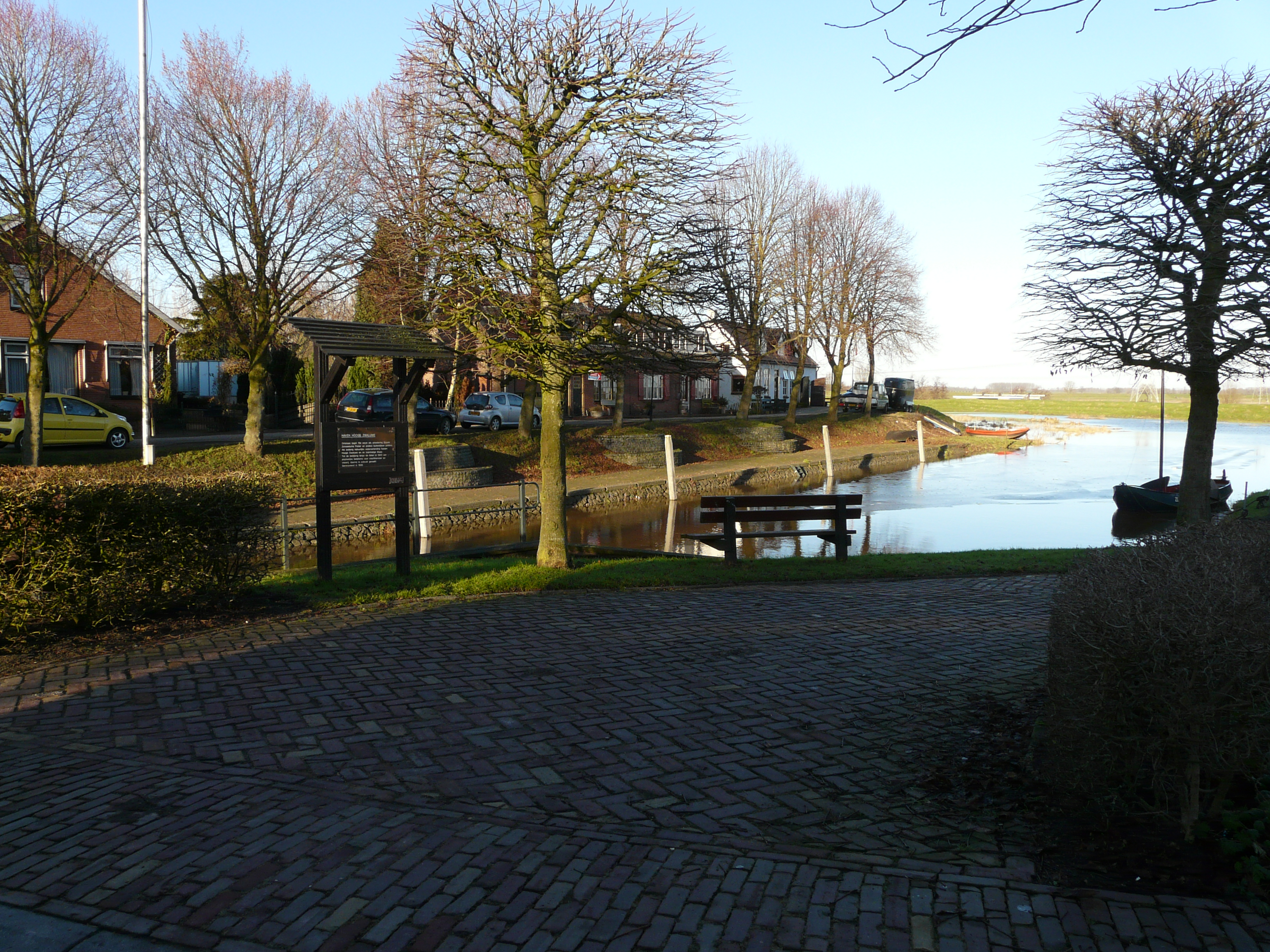
- Harbour of Hooge Zwaluwe

- Location in the province of North Brabant in the Netherlands Hooge Zwaluwe (Netherlands)
- Coordinates: 51.6833°N 4.7471°E
- Country: Netherlands
- Province: North Brabant
- Municipality: Drimmelen

Area
  - Total: 16.25 km^{2} (6.27 sq mi)
- Elevation: −0.6 m (−2.0 ft)

Population (2021)
  - Total: 1,770
  - Density: 109/km^{2} (282/sq mi)
- Time zone: UTC+1 (CET)
  - Summer (DST): UTC+2 (CEST)
- Postal code: 4927
- Dialing code: 0168

Hooge Zwaluwe is a village in the Dutch province of North Brabant. It is located in the municipality of Drimmelen, about 3.5 km north-west of Made.

== History ==
The village was first mentioned in 1291 as Zwaluwe, and refers to a river (Grote Hollandse Waard). The etymology is based on the verb to swell (to become bigger). Hooge (high) has been added to distinguish from Lage Zwaluwe. During the St. Elizabeth flood of 1421, the polders were flooded by the Grote Hollandse Waard. In the 16th century, a new western dike was built and Hooge Zwaluwe started to develop along the dike. South of the centre, there is a concentration of houses around the Catholic church.

The Dutch Reformed church was built next to the dike between 1639 and 1641. In 1910, it was damaged by fire. A little open square tower was constructed on top of the church. The Catholic St Willibrordus Church is an aisleless church in Gothic Revival style built in 1865. The tower was enlarged between 1919 and 1920. The church was decommissioned in 2013 and has been converted into a restaurant.

The grist mill Zeldenrust was built in 1866. The wind mill was restored to working order between 1994 and 1997. The wind mill grinds on voluntary basis.

Hooge Zwaluwe was home to 731 people in 1840. In 1886, a railway station opened on the Lage Zwaluwe to 's-Hertogenbosch railway line. The station closed in 1950, and the building was demolished in 1960. Hooge Zwaluwe formed a municipality with Lage Zwaluwe as Hooge en Lage Zwaluwe. in 1996, it was merged into Drimmelen.

== Notable people ==
- Johannes Gijsbert Vogel (1828–1915), landscape painter

== Gallery ==
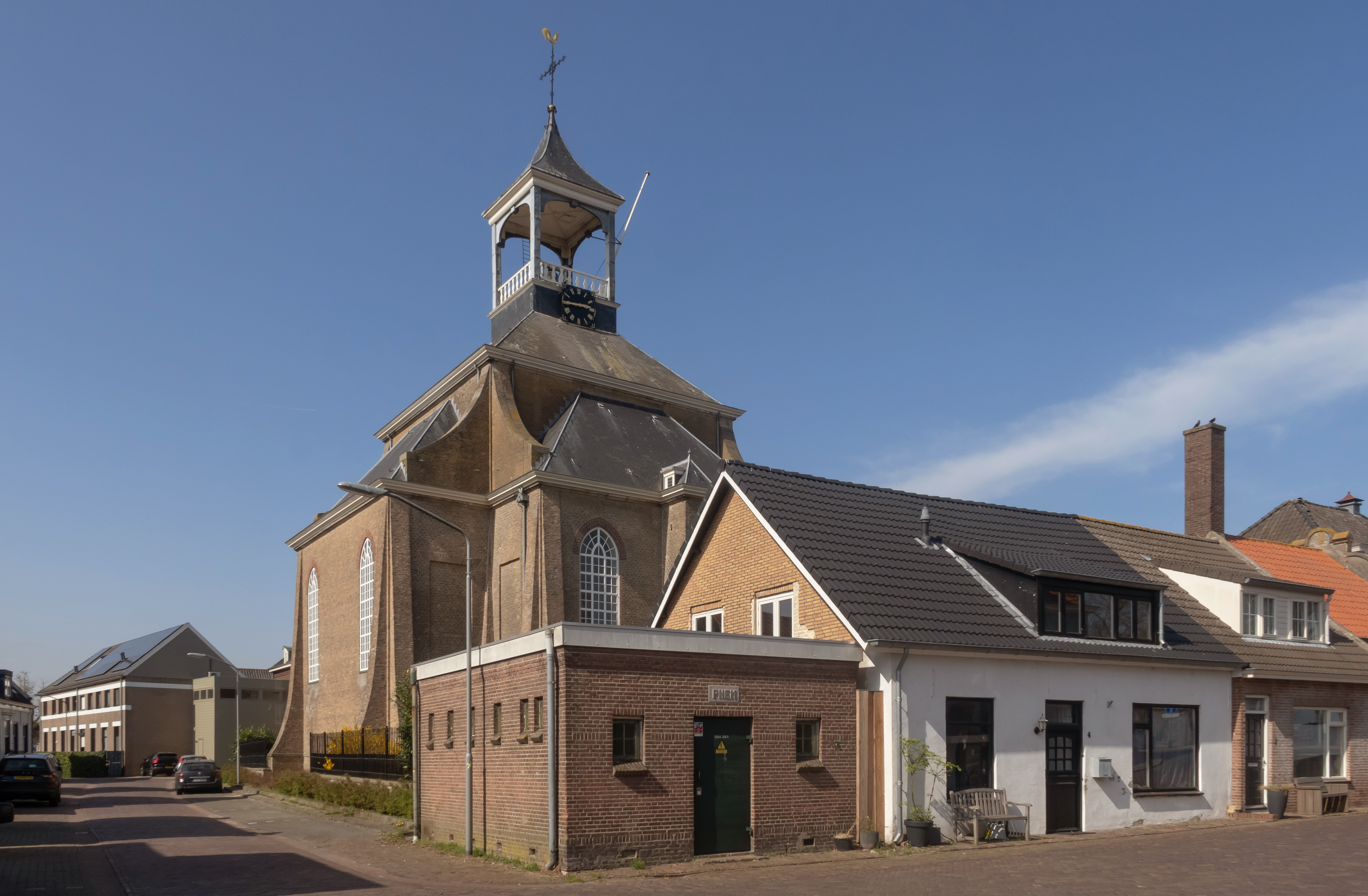
Protestant Church

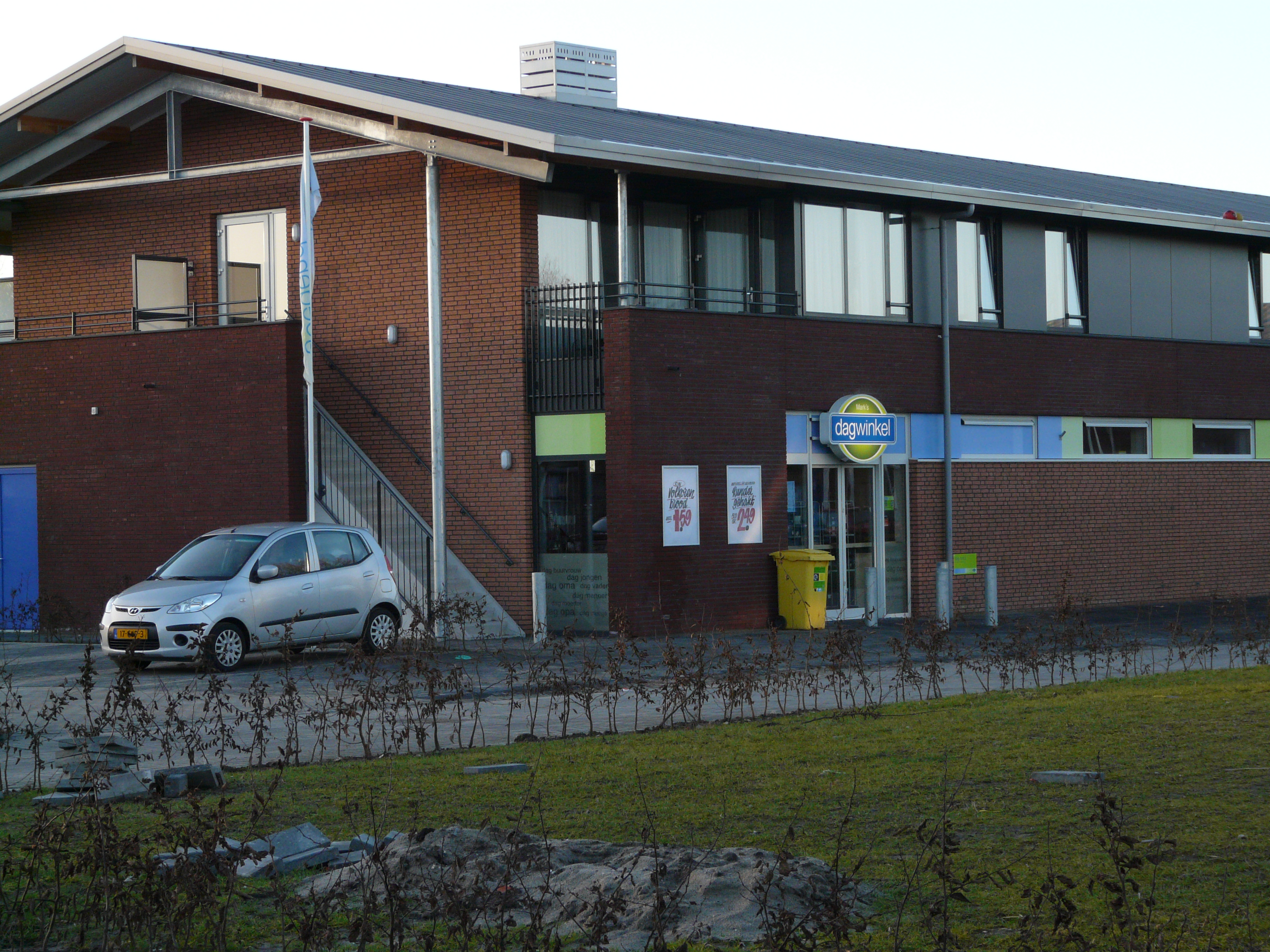
Supermarket

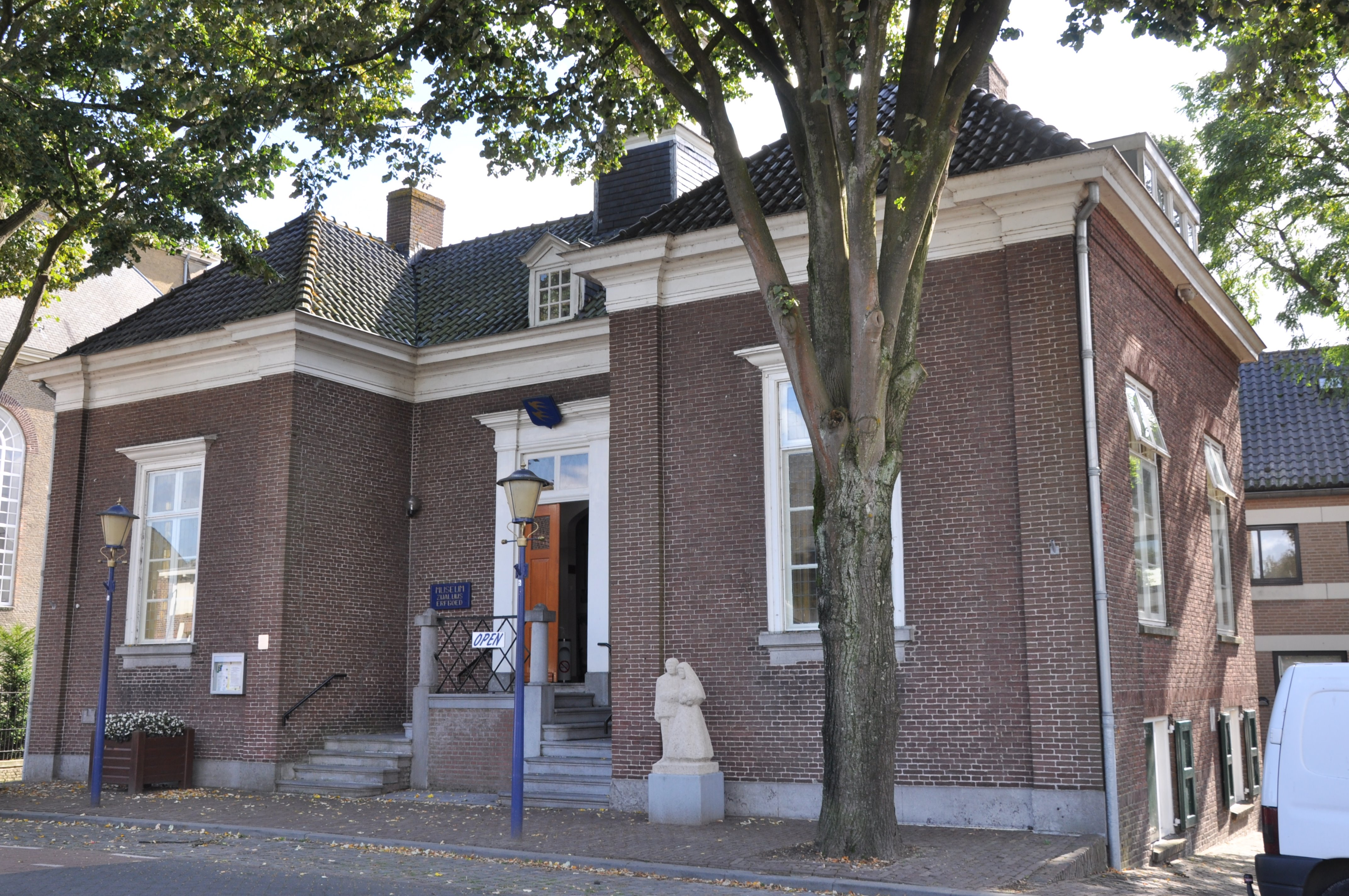
Former town hall

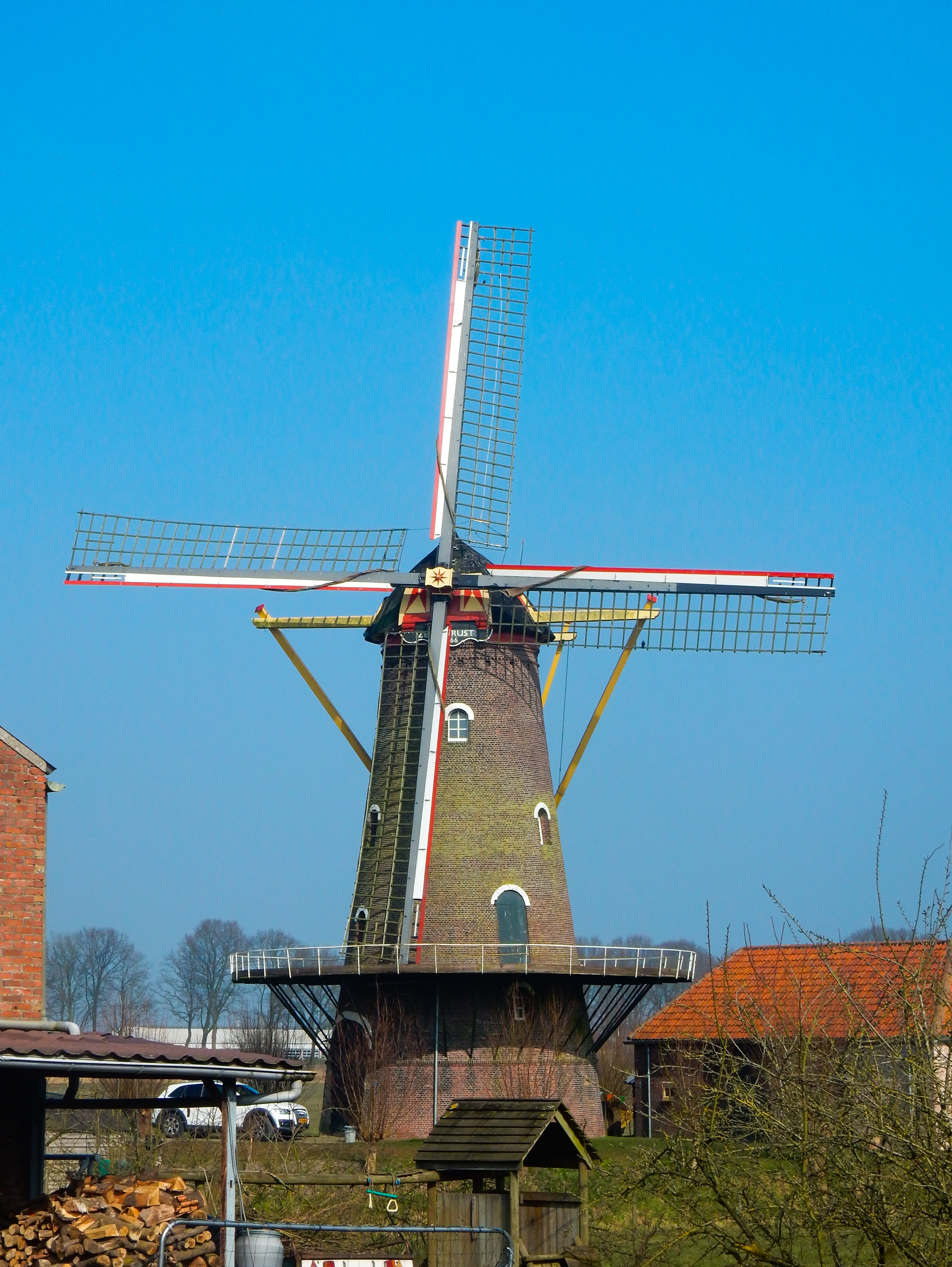
Windmill Zeldenrust
