= Hans Horrevoets =

Dutch sailor (1974–2006)

- Born: April 26, 1974; Made, Netherlands
- Died: May 18, 2006 (aged 32); Land's End, England
- Cause of death: Drowning
- Occupation: Sailor

Hans Horrevoets (26 April 1974 in Made – 18 May 2006) was a Dutch sea sailor. He was part of the Brunel Sunergy team in the 1997/98 Whitbread Round The World Race as the youngest member in the race. In 2001/02, he was to be part of the Belgium Yess project, but the project failed. He won the Swan Europeans twice with the Aqua Equinox, and as skipper with the Holmatro talentboat he won the Cowes Week (twice), the Fastnet Race, the Channel Race, the Round Gotland Race and was the best boat at the 2005 Commodores' Cup.

Horrevoets was the owner of the company Yacht Invest in Terheijden, North Brabant, from 1998. His pregnant wife Petra and his eleven-month-old daughter Bobbi survived him when he drowned in May 2006 aged 32.

== Disappearance and aftermath ==
Horrevoets disappeared while he was among the crew of the ABN AMRO TWO. During the 7th stage of the 2005–2006 Volvo Ocean Race from New York to Portsmouth, he was washed overboard about 1,300 nautical miles (2,410 km) west of Land's End in England and briefly disappeared. His colleagues later recovered him, but attempts to resuscitate him failed.

== Horrevoets Trophy ==
In May 2009, Volvo Ocean Race launched the Hans Horrevoets Rookie Award to recognize the outstanding under-30 sailor in each edition of the Race as nominated by the respective skippers.

Recipients

- 2008-09 - Michael "Michi" Mueller - Puma Ocean Racing.
- 2011-12 - David "Dave" Swete - Team Sanya.
- 2014-15 - Sophie Ciszek - Team SCA.
- 2017-18 - Bleddyn Mon - Turn the Tide on Plastic
