= Johannes Vogel =

Johannes Vogel may refer to:

- Johannes Vogel (botanist) (born 1963), German botanist
- Johannes Vogel (politician) (born 1982), German politician
- Johannes Gijsbert Vogel (1828–1915), Dutch landscape painter
