= Lage Zwaluwe =

- Village
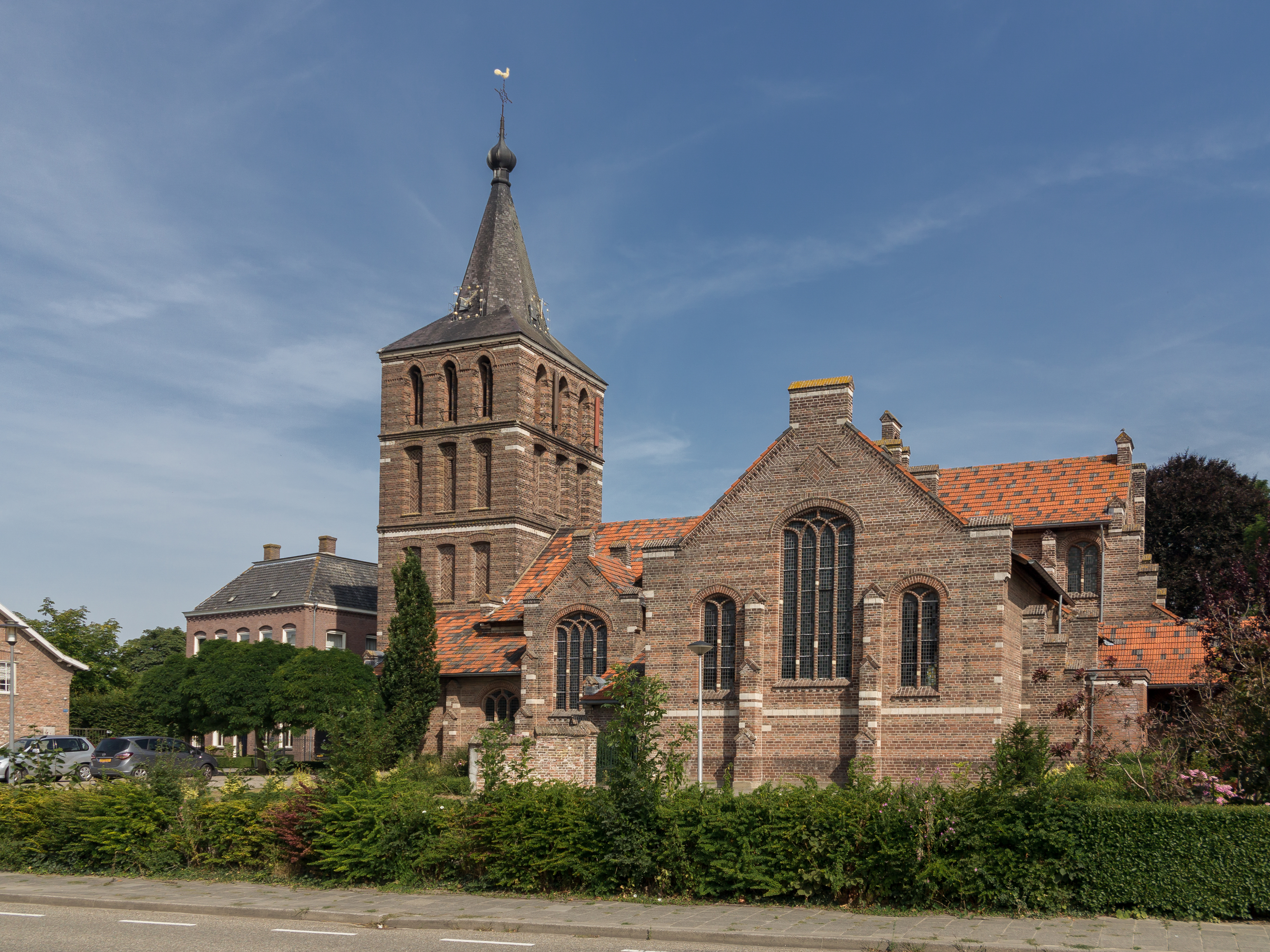
- St John the Baptist Church

- Location in the province of North Brabant in the Netherlands Lage Zwaluwe (Netherlands)
- Coordinates: 51°42′29″N 4°42′12″E
- Country: Netherlands
- Province: North Brabant
- Municipality: Drimmelen

Area
  - Total: 23.58 km^{2} (9.10 sq mi)
- Elevation: 1.2 m (3.9 ft)

Population (2021)
  - Total: 4,110
  - Density: 174/km^{2} (451/sq mi)
- Time zone: UTC+1 (CET)
  - Summer (DST): UTC+2 (CEST)
- Postal code: 4926
- Dialing code: 0168

Lage Zwaluwe is a village in the municipality Drimmelen, North Brabant, the Netherlands. The Lage Zwaluwe railway station and the Moerdijk bridges lie to the west of the village.

== History ==
The village was first mentioned in as 1291 Zwaluwe, and means whirling, rushing river. Laag (lower) has been added by distinguish from Hooge Zwaluwe. Lage Zwaluwe developed as a linear settlement along the dike of the Grote Hollandse Waard.

The Dutch Reformed church dates from 1816 and was extended in 1867. The Catholic St John the Baptist church was built in 1951 and contains three 17th-century Flemish paintings.

Lage Zwaluwe was home to 1,241 people in 1840. In 1866, the Lage Zwaluwe railway station opened. The original station building was destroyed in 1945. In 1950, a small building was constructed. It was demolished for the construction of HSL-Zuid, the high speed railway line. In 2003, a glass air bridge was built.

Lage Zwaluwe used to be part of the municipality of Hooge en Lage Zwaluwe. In 1996, it was merged into Drimmelen.

== Gallery ==
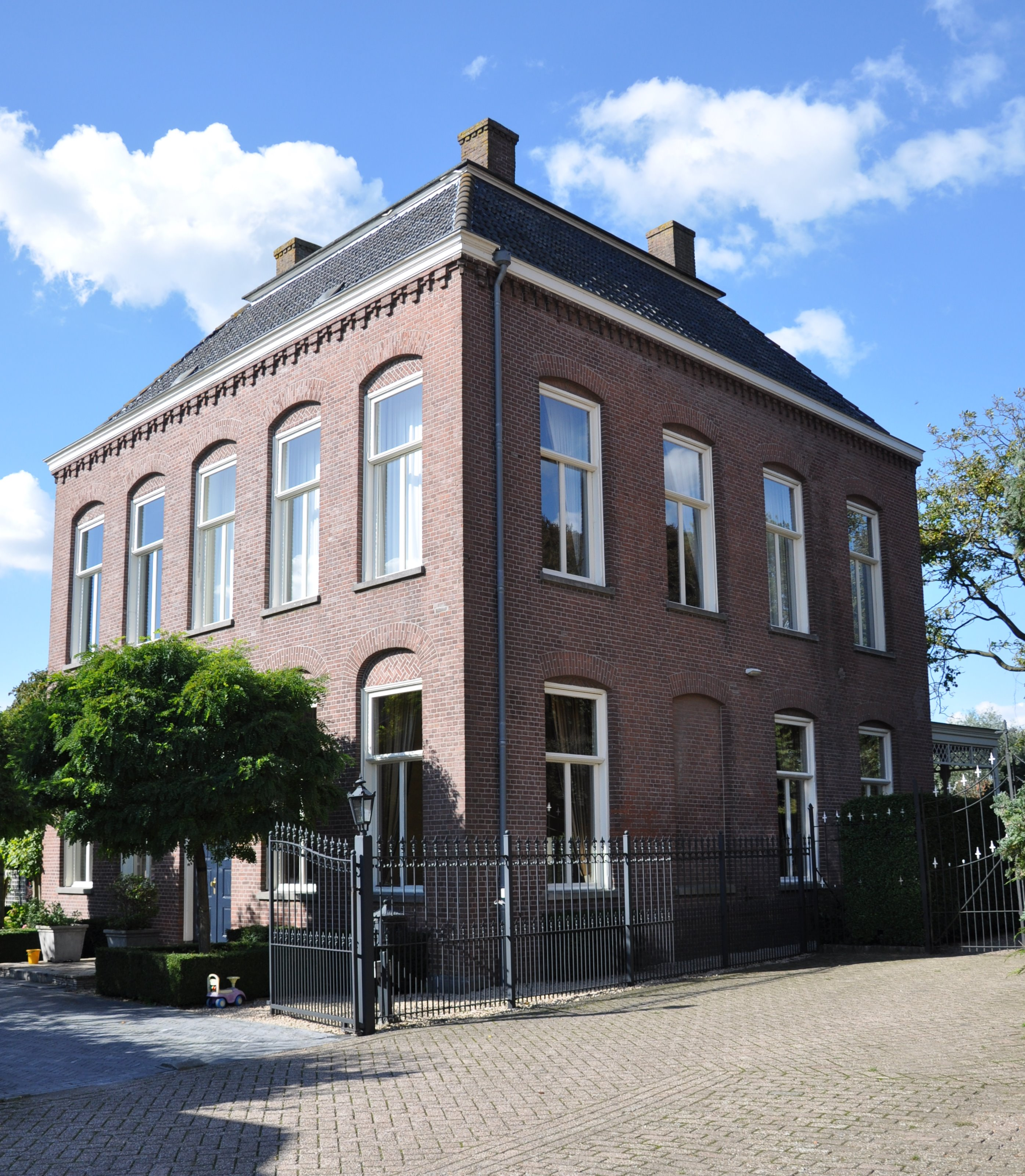
Clergy house

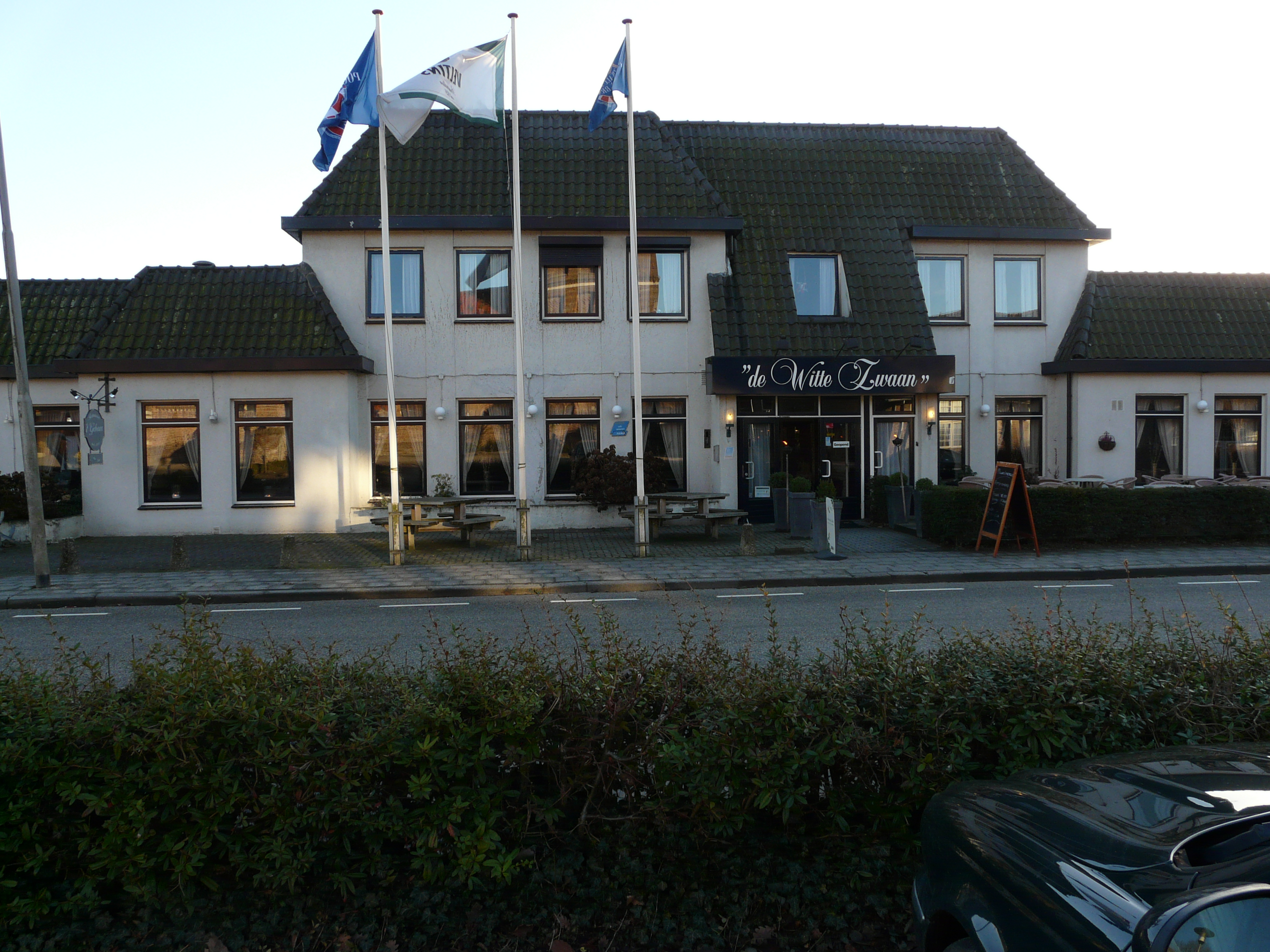
Hotel

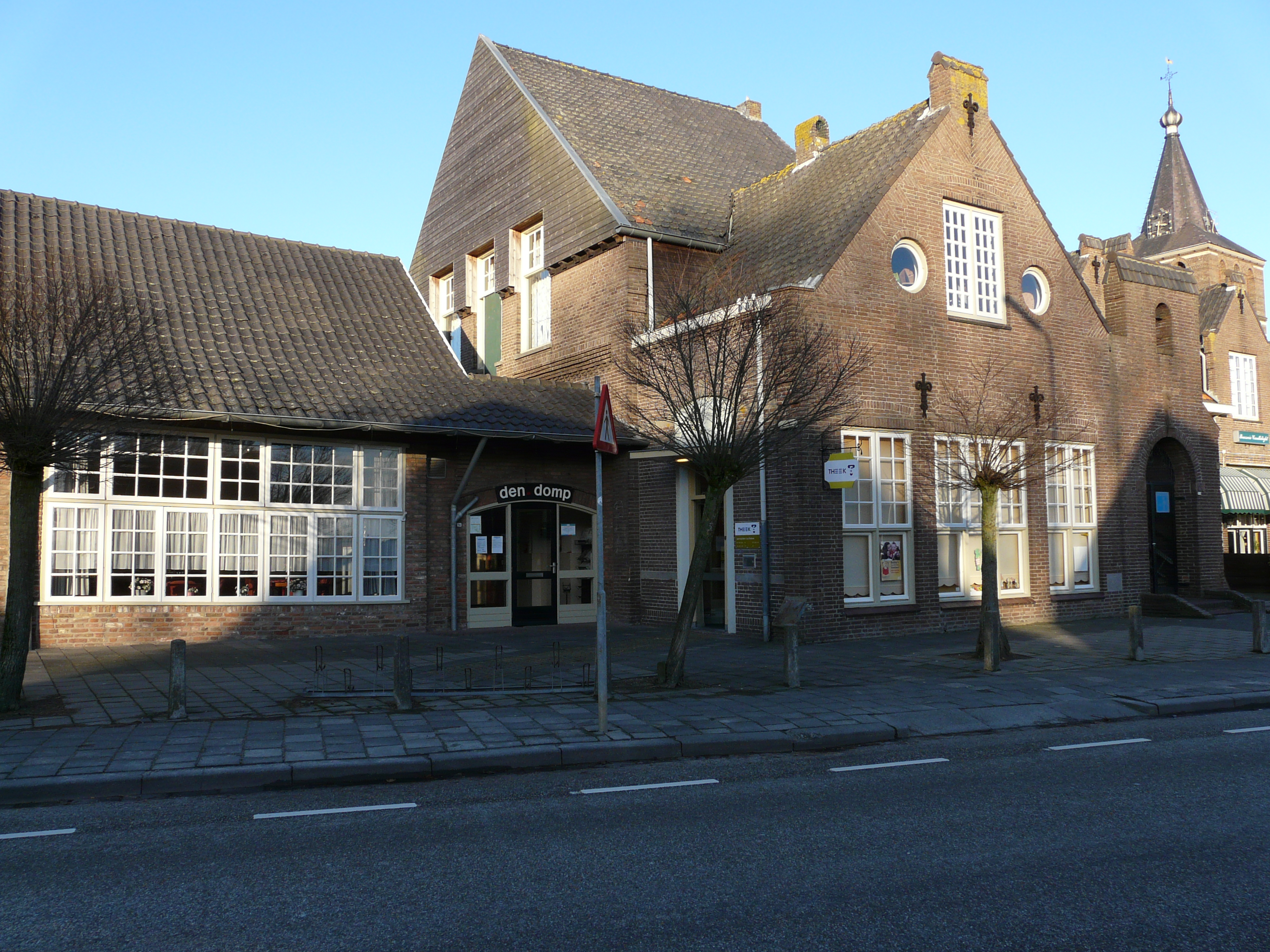
School

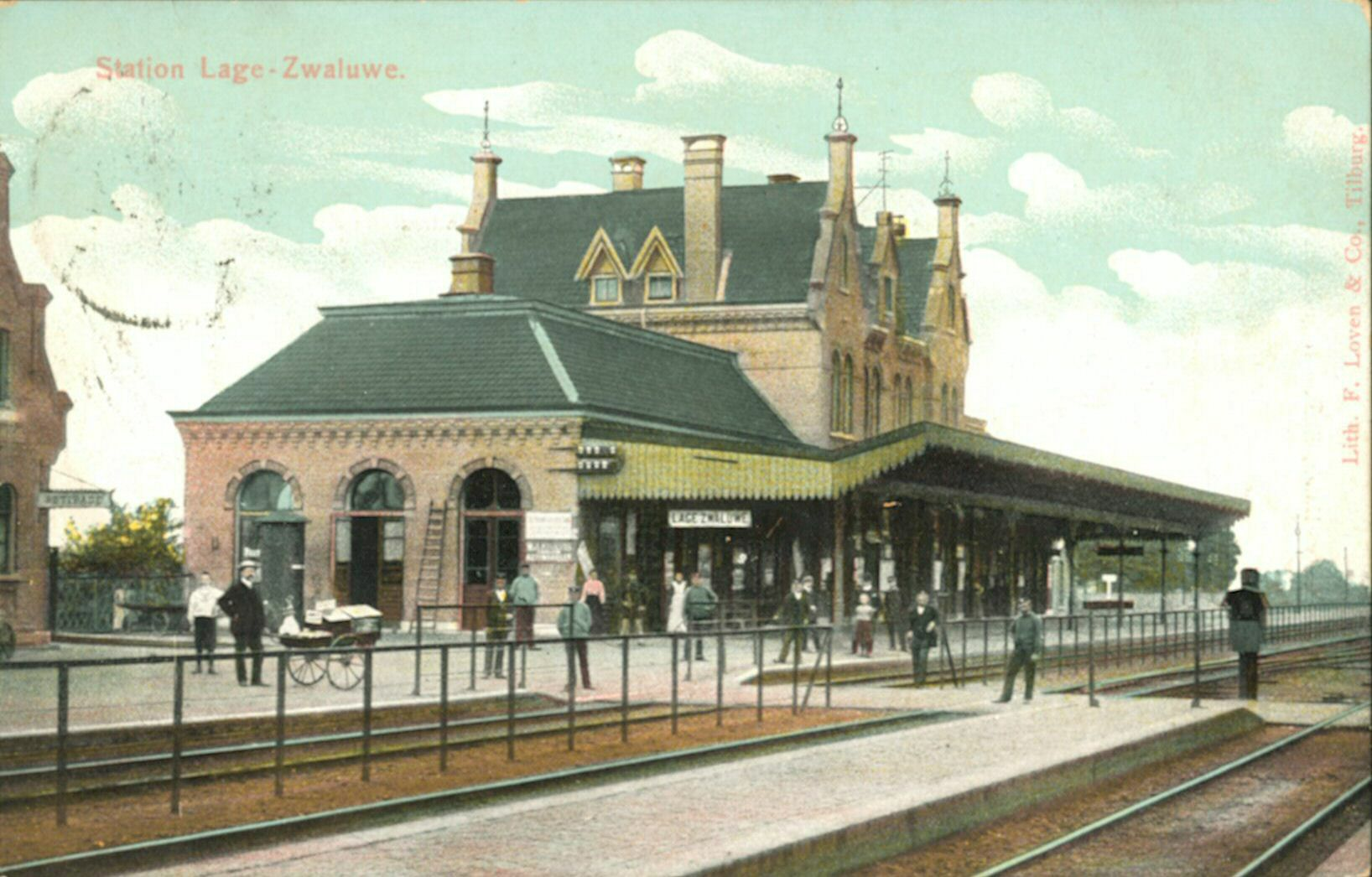
The old railway station
