= Hooge en Lage Zwaluwe =

Coordinates: 51.698949°N 4.724464°E

Hooge en Lage Zwaluwe was a municipality in the Dutch province of North Brabant. It included the villages of Lage Zwaluwe, and Hooge Zwaluwe.

Hooge en Lage Zwaluwe existed until 1997, when it merged with Made.
