= Made, Netherlands =

Made
- Village
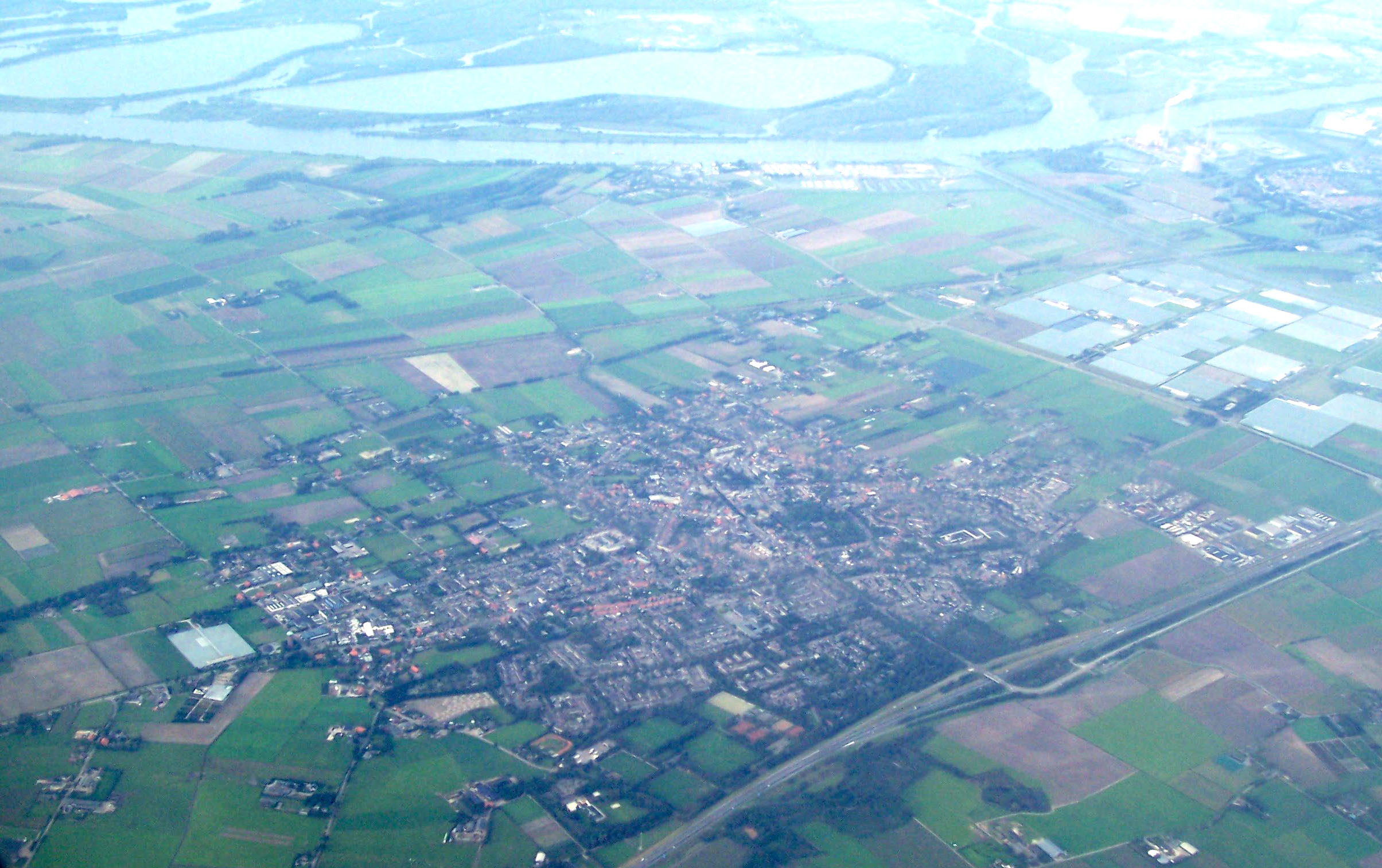
- Aerial view

- Location in the province of North Brabant in the Netherlands Made (Netherlands)
- Coordinates: 51°40′35″N 4°47′33″E
- Country: Netherlands
- Province: North Brabant
- Municipality: Drimmelen

Area
  - Total: 11.46 km^{2} (4.42 sq mi)
- Elevation: 2.0 m (6.6 ft)

Population (2021)
  - Total: 12,470
  - Density: 1,088/km^{2} (2,818/sq mi)
- Time zone: UTC+1 (CET)
  - Summer (DST): UTC+2 (CEST)
- Postal code: 4921
- Dialing code: 0162

Made is a town in the Dutch province of North Brabant. It is located in the municipality of Drimmelen, about 10 km northeast of Breda.

== History ==
The village was first mentioned in 1321 as die Made, and means hay land. Until the 14th century, Made was part of the meadows of Geertruidenberg and was considered part of the city until 1795.

The Dutch Reformed church dates from 1512. In 1944, it was damaged by war and restored in 1952. The Catholic St. Bernardus Church was built in 1870. Made was home to 1,104 people in 1840.

Between 1997 and 1998, "Made" was the name of a municipality, created in the merger of the former municipalities of Hooge en Lage Zwaluwe, Made en Drimmelen, and Terheijden. In 1998, the name of the municipality was changed to "Drimmelen".

Made lies along the highway A59, which puts it in close range of both the A16 and the A27.

Made has public sports associations for soccer, scouting, tennis and hockey, as well as for several indoor sports like badminton, table tennis and gymnastics. There is an outdoor public swimming pool the "Randoet", which opens only between May and October.

== Gallery ==
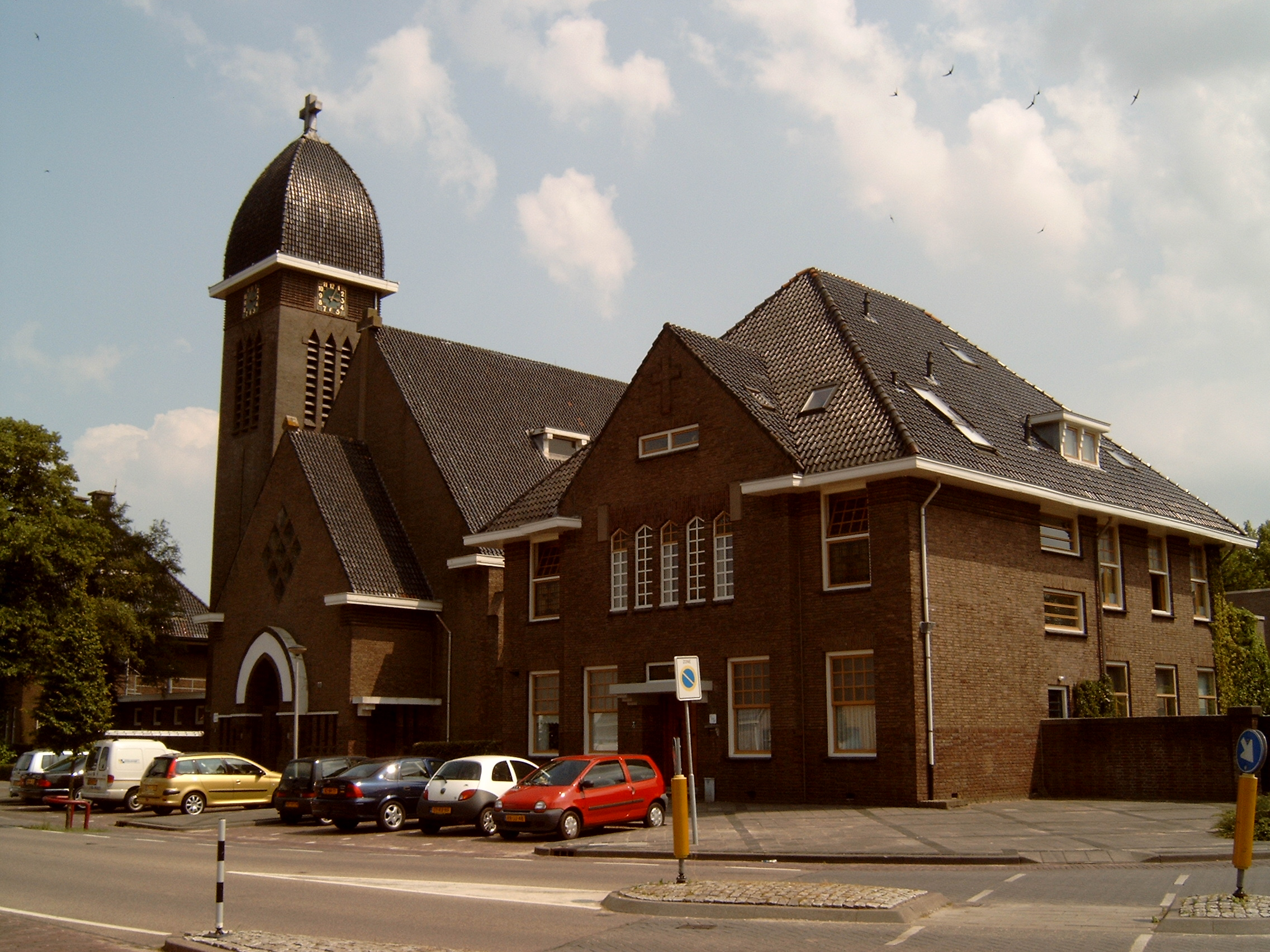
Made, Catholic St. Blasius church

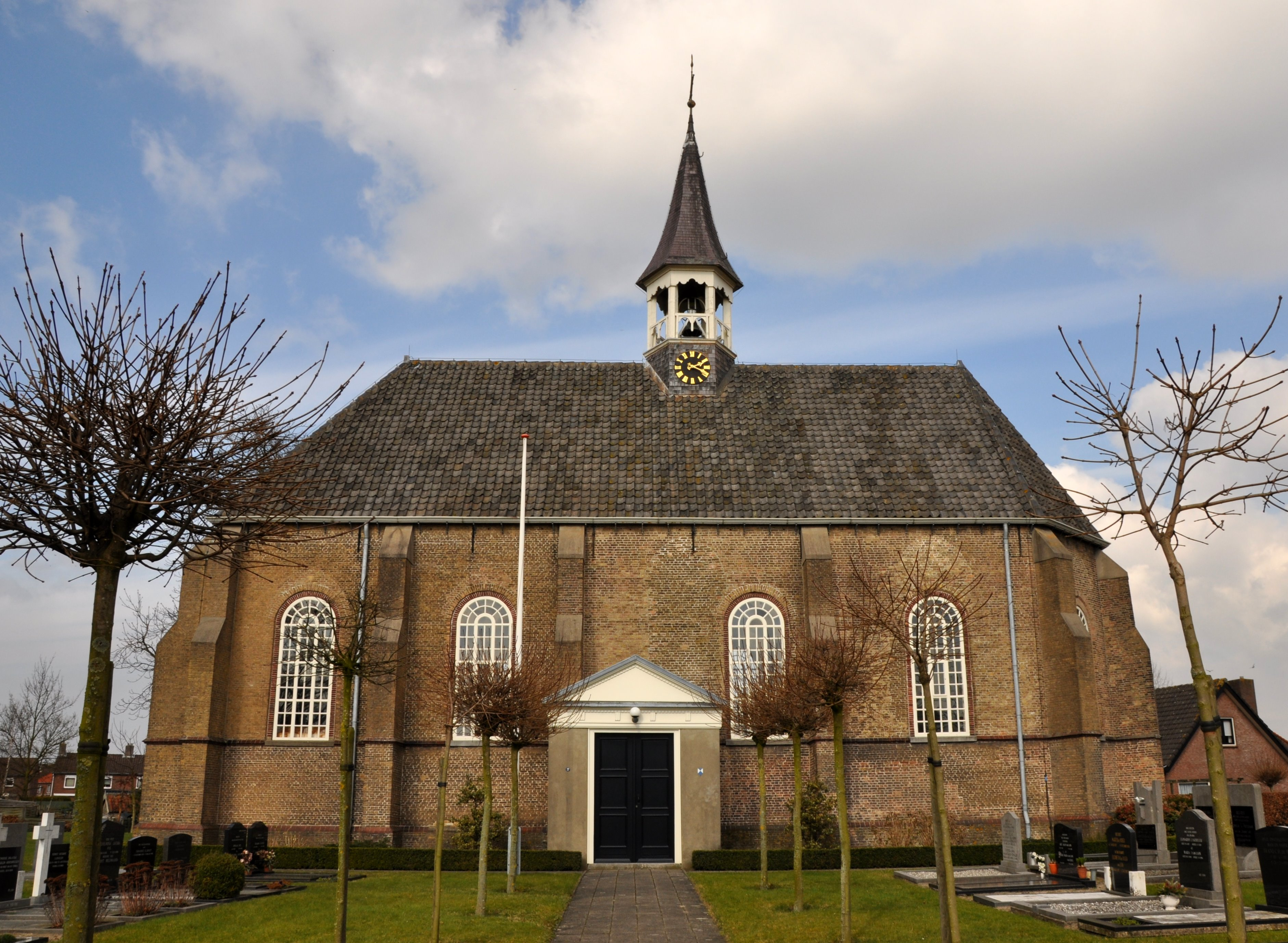
Made, Protestant church

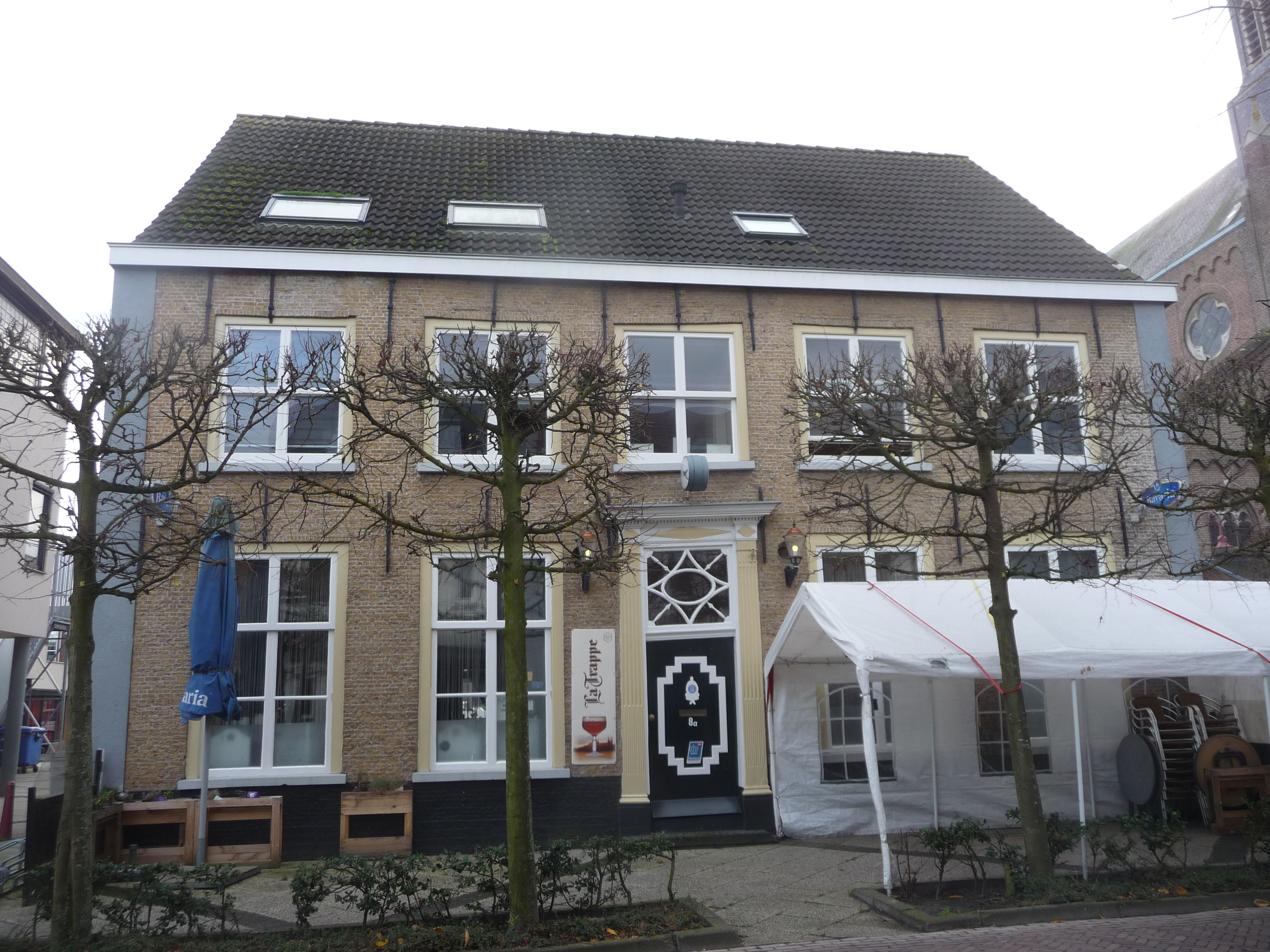
Pub in Made

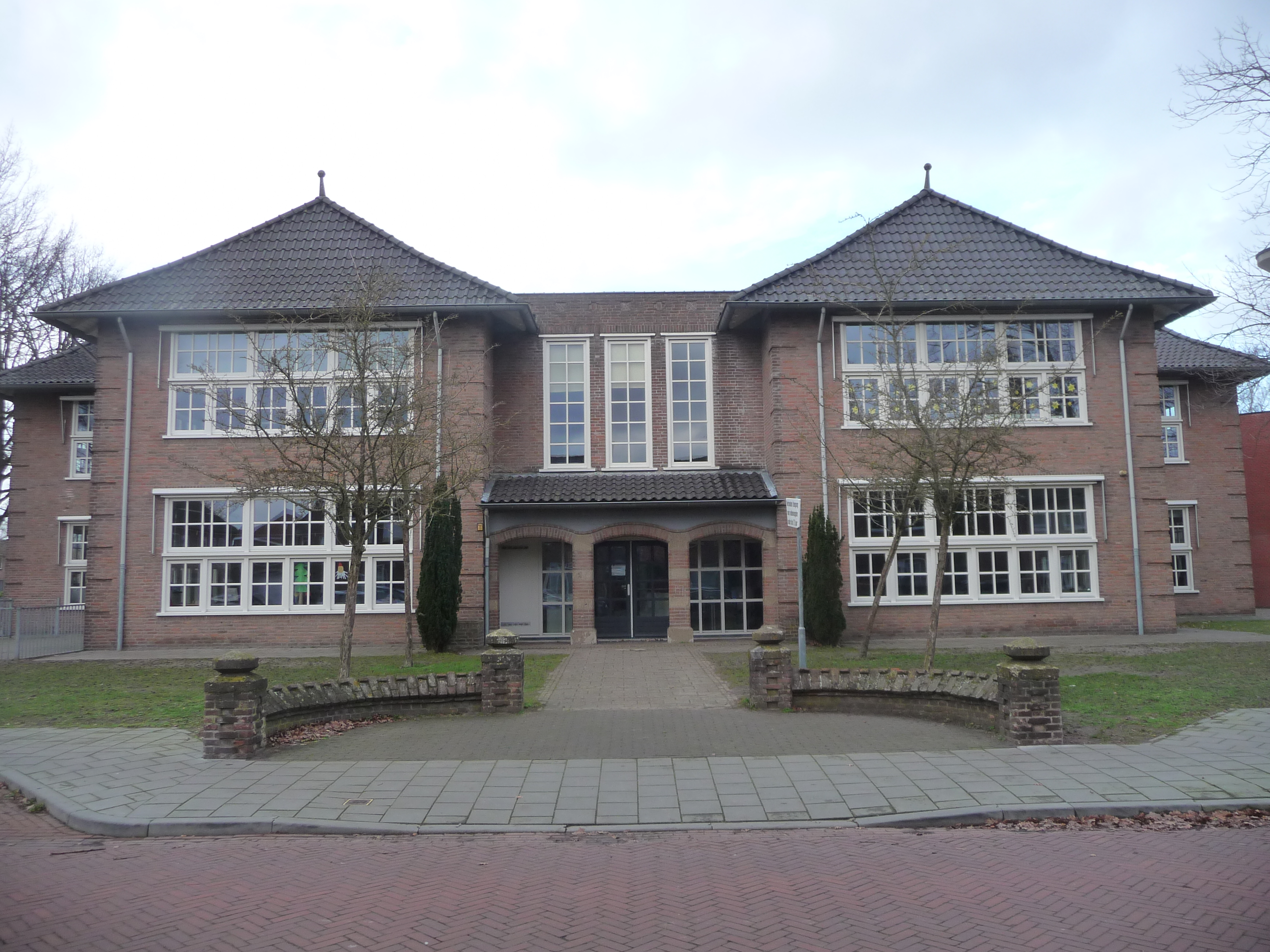
School in Made
