= Drimmelen =

- Municipality
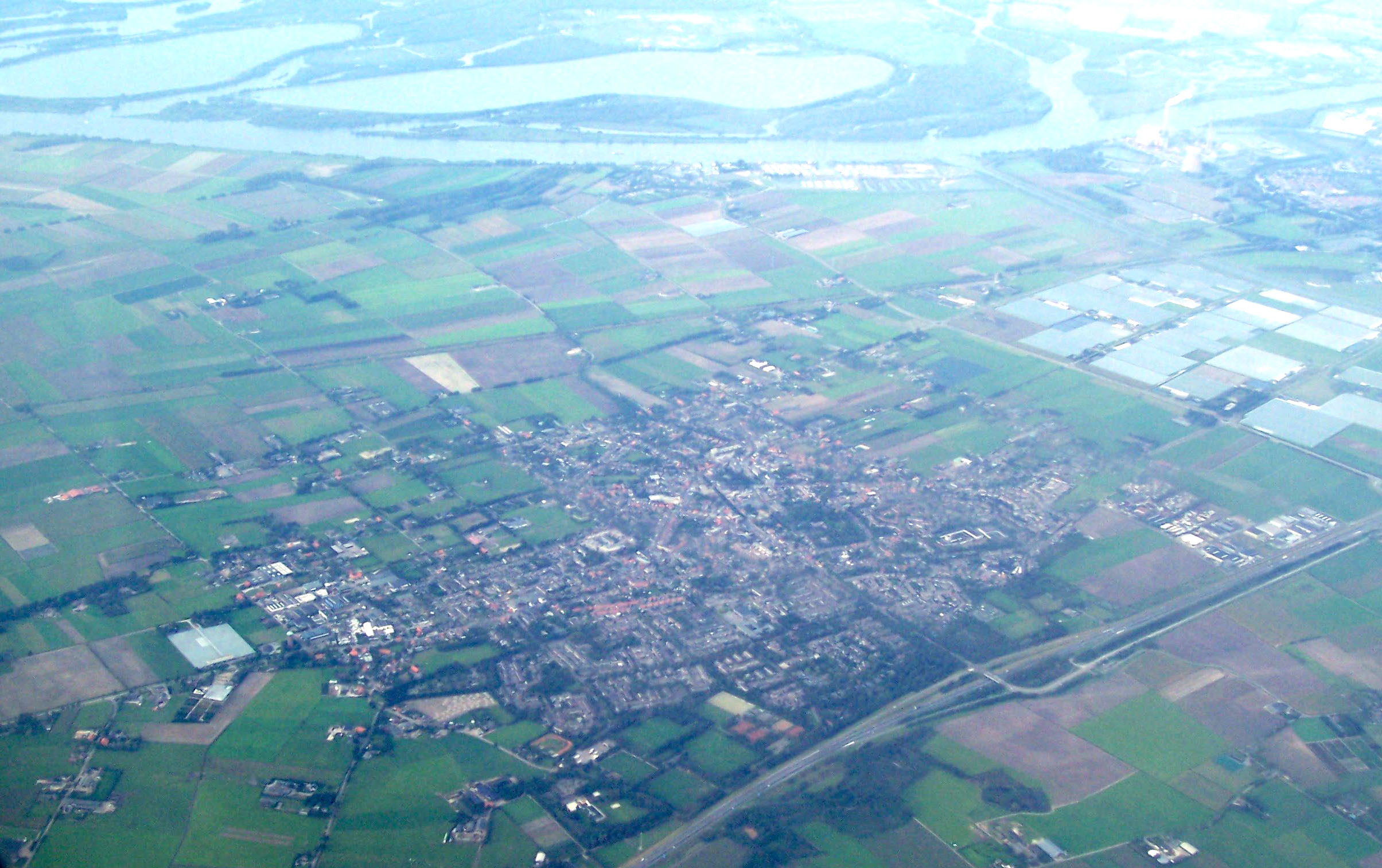
- Aerial photo of Made

- Flag Coat of arms

- Location in North Brabant
- Coordinates: 51°41′N 4°48′E
- Country: Netherlands
- Province: North Brabant

Government
  - Body: Municipal council
  - Mayor: Boy Scholtze (VVD)

Area
  - Total: 119.43 km^{2} (46.11 sq mi)
  - Land: 95.18 km^{2} (36.75 sq mi)
  - Water: 24.25 km^{2} (9.36 sq mi)
- Elevation: 3 m (9.8 ft)

Population (January 2021)
  - Total: 27,325
  - Density: 287/km^{2} (740/sq mi)
- Time zone: UTC+1 (CET)
  - Summer (DST): UTC+2 (CEST)
- Postcode: 4844–4845, 4920–4927
- Area code: 0162
- Website: www.drimmelen.nl

Drimmelen (Dutch pronunciation: [ˈdrɪmələ(n)]) is a municipality and a town in southern Netherlands, in the province North Brabant.

A large portion of the Biesbosch National Park is part of this municipality.

== Population centres ==
Towns:

- Made (population: 11,710)
- Terheijden (6,410)
- Lage Zwaluwe (4,060)
- Wagenberg (2,250)
- Hooge Zwaluwe (1,670)
- Drimmelen (570)

Hamlets (population data included in that of nearby towns):

- Blauwe Sluis
- Oud-Drimmelen
- Helkant

=== Topography ===
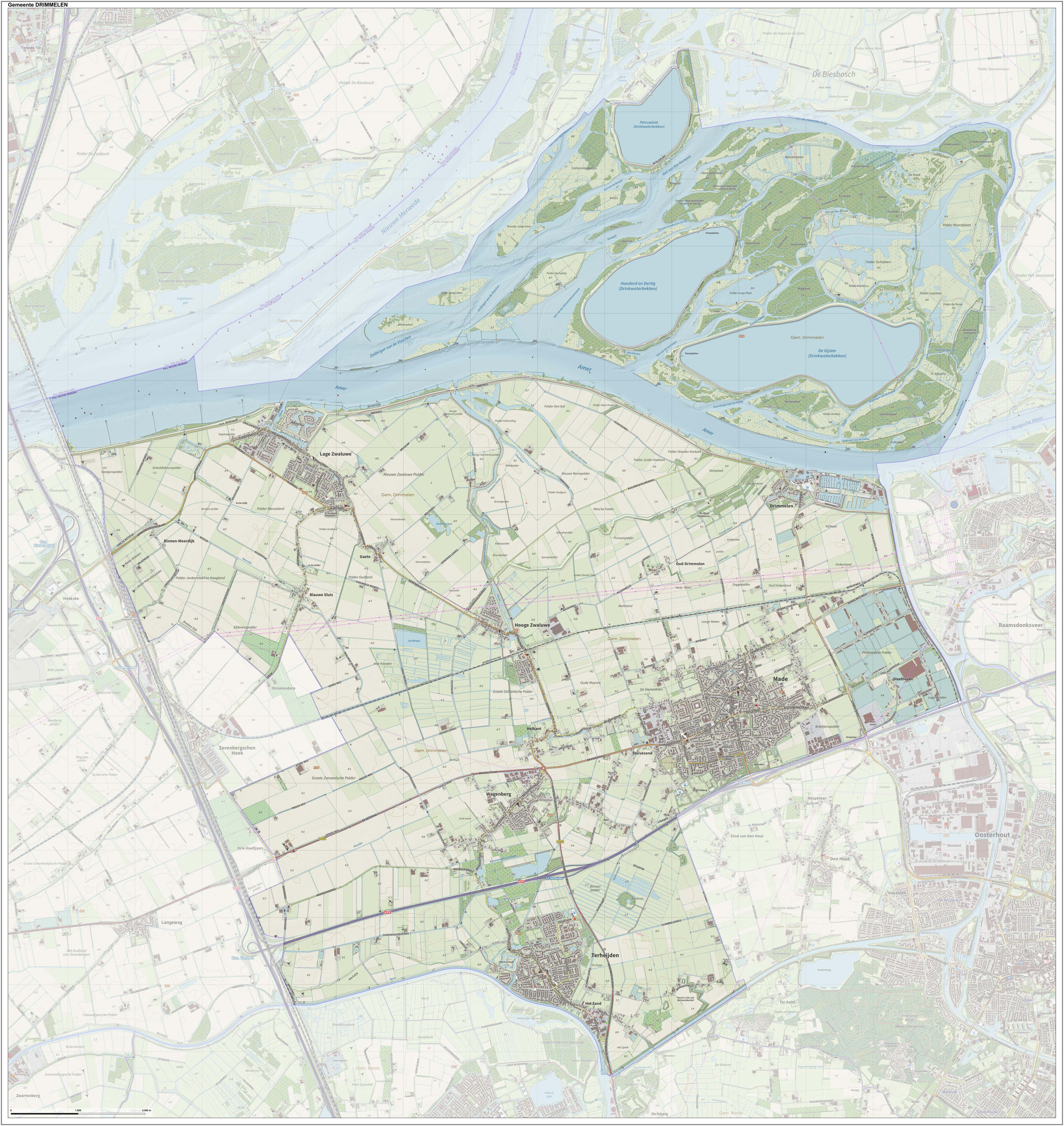

Map of the municipality of Drimmelen, June 2015.

== Transportation ==
The Lage Zwaluwe railway station is situated on the Breda–Rotterdam railway and the railway to Roosendaal.

== Notable people ==
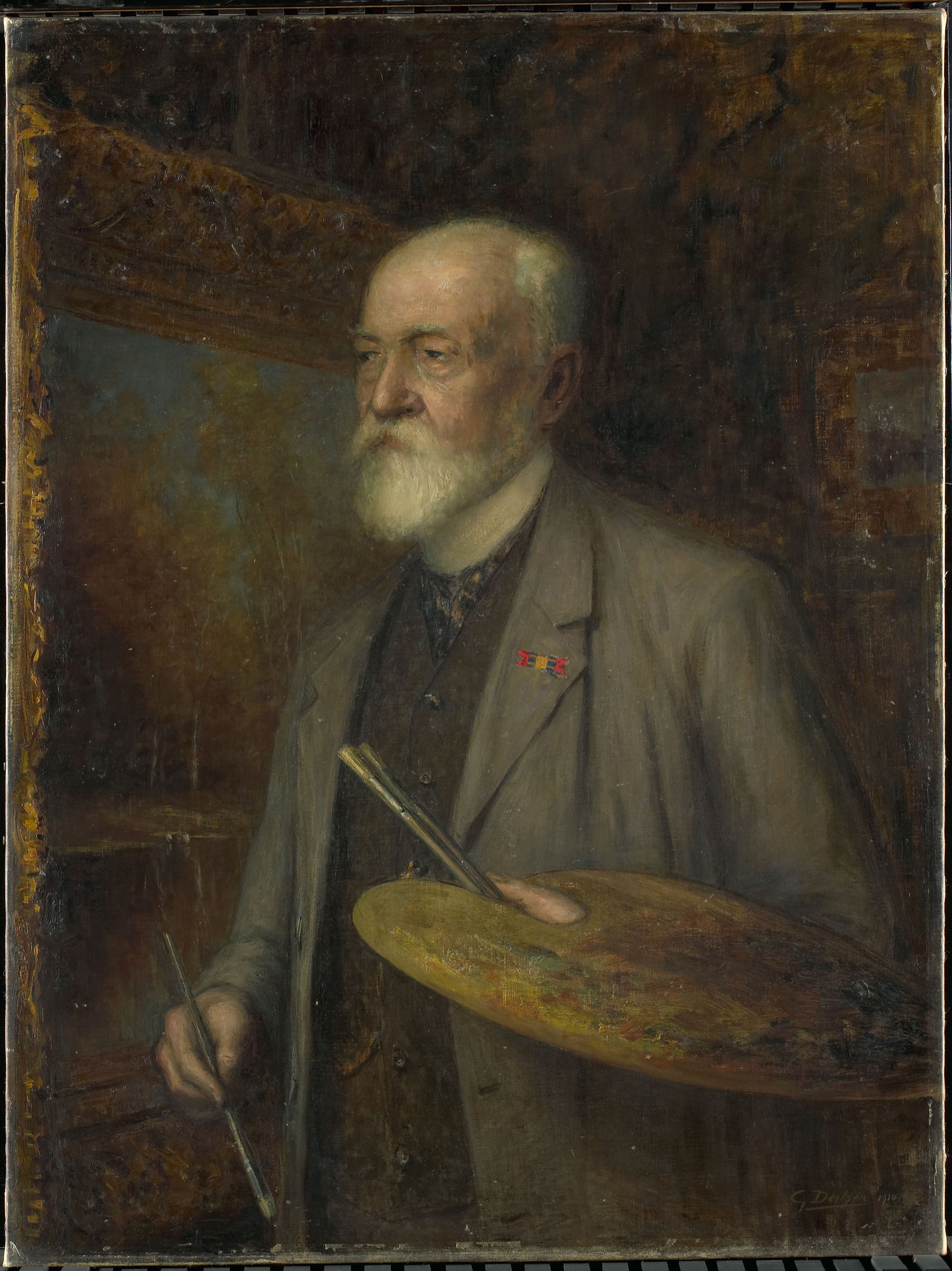
J G Vogel, 1910

- Godfried Schalcken (1643 in Made – 1706) a Dutch genre and portrait painter
- Pieter Rudolph Kleijn (1785 in Hooge Zwaluwe – 1816) a 19th-century landscape painter
- Petrus van Schendel (1806 in Terheijden – 1870) a Dutch-Belgian Romantic style genre painter
- Johannes Gijsbert Vogel (1828 in Hooge Zwaluwe – 1915) a Dutch landscape painter
- Antal van den Bosch (born 1969 in Made) a Dutch-language researcher and former academic

=== Sport ===
- Kees Pellenaars (1913 in Terheijden – 1988) a road cyclist and coach
- Antoon van Schendel (1918 in Lage Zwaluwe – 1990) a professional road bicycle racer.
- Wim Hofkens (born 1958 in Made) a former football player with 474 club caps
- Gianni Romme (born 1973 in Lage Zwaluwe) a marathon runner and a former long track speed skater, won two gold medals at the 1998 Winter Olympics
- Hans Horrevoets (born 1974 in Made – 2006) a sea sailor
- Tim Lips (born 1985 in Made) a Dutch eventer, competed at the 2008 and the 2012 Summer Olympics
- Pieter Braun (born 1993 in Terheijden) is a decathlon athlete, competed at the 2016 Summer Olympics

== Gallery ==
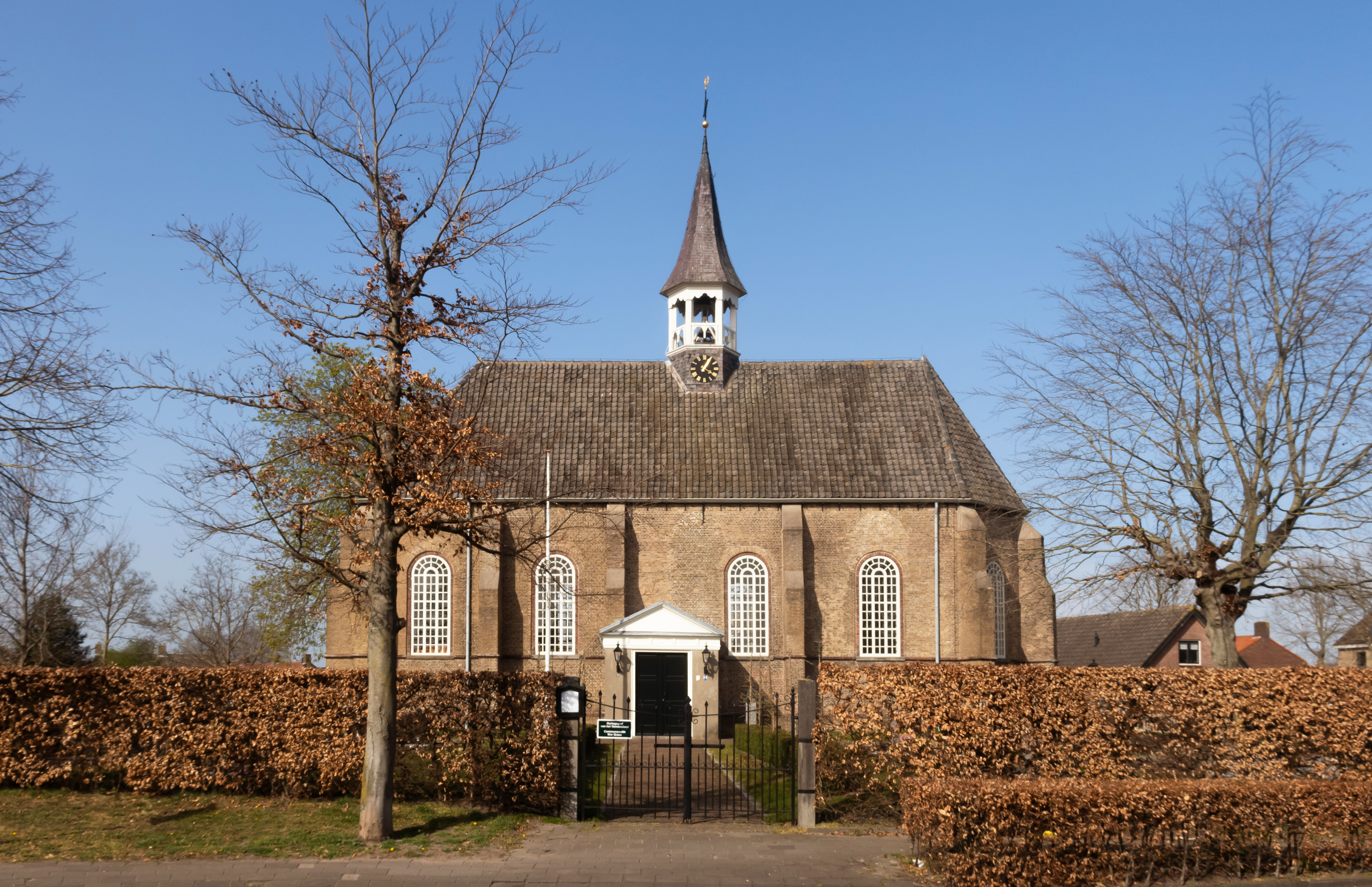
Made, reformed church

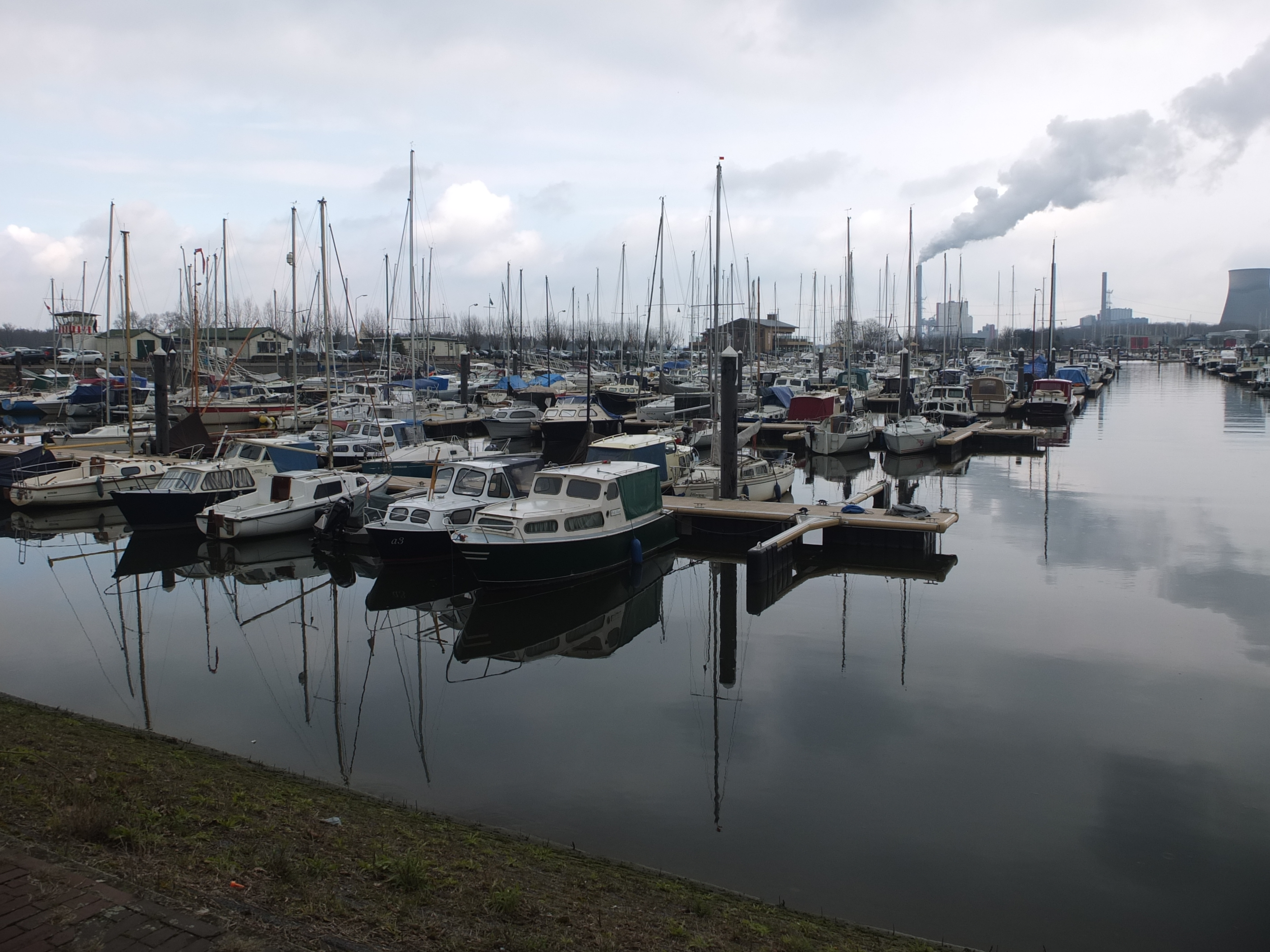
Jachthaven, Drimmelen

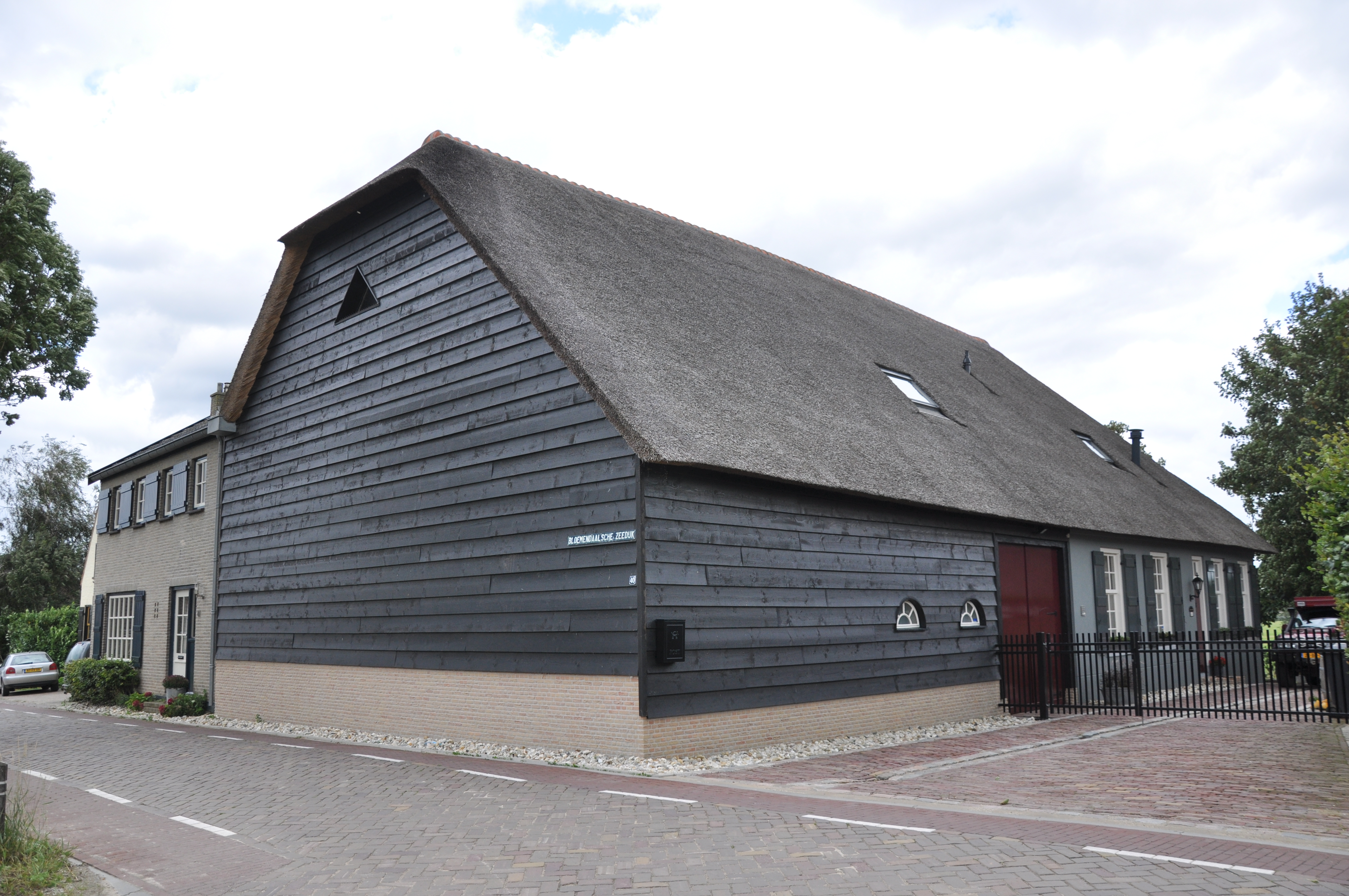
House with business area, Bloemendaalse Zeedijk 40, Blauwe Sluis

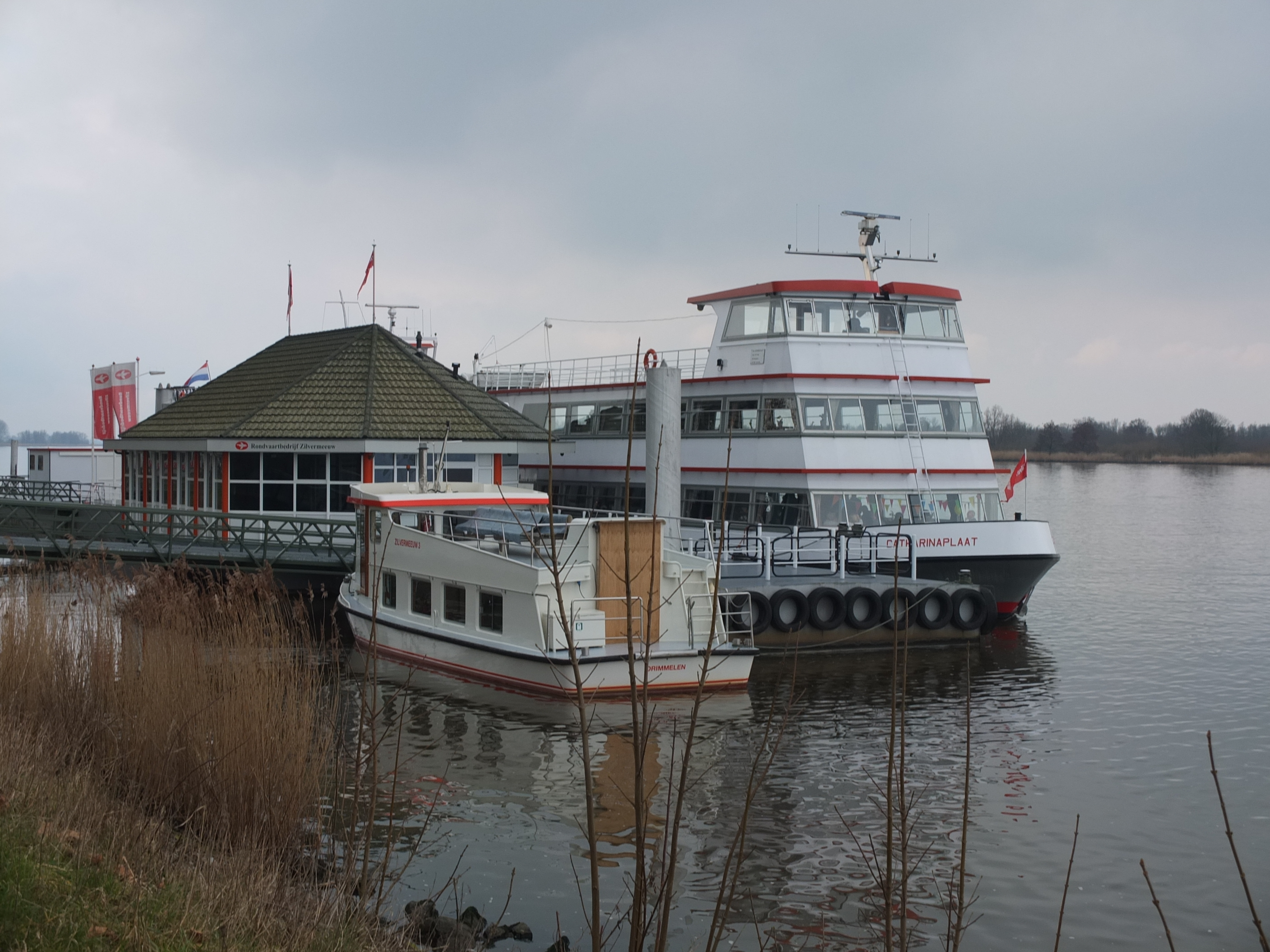
Zilvermeeuw, Drimmelen
