= Johannes Gijsbert Vogel =

Dutch painter

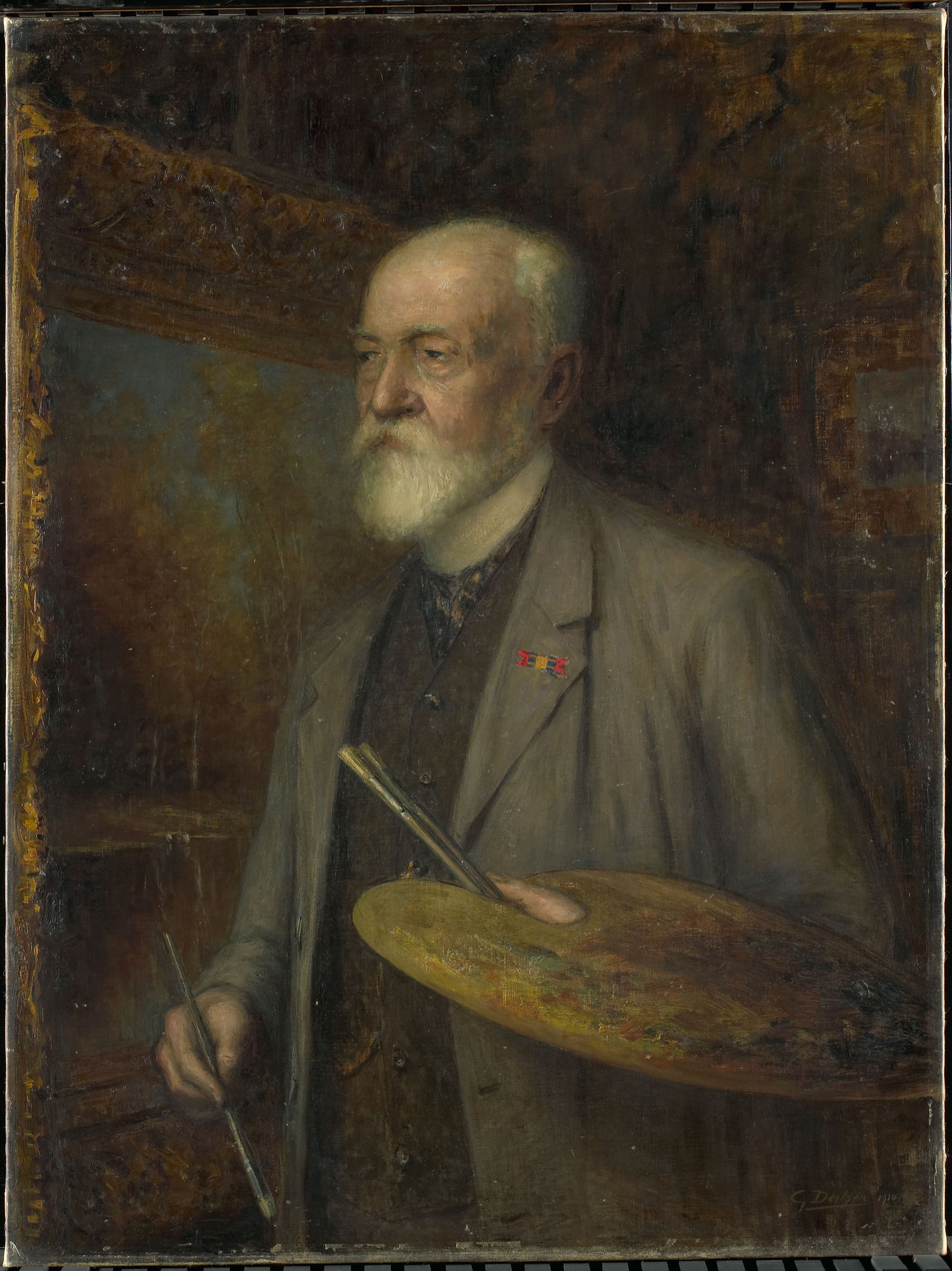
- Johannes Gijsbert Vogel, by Gijsbertus Derksen
- Born: 25 June 1828; Hooge Zwaluwe
- Died: 15 May 1915 (aged 86); Velp, Gelderland

Johannes Gijsbert Vogel (25 June 1828 – 15 May 1915) was a Dutch landscape painter.

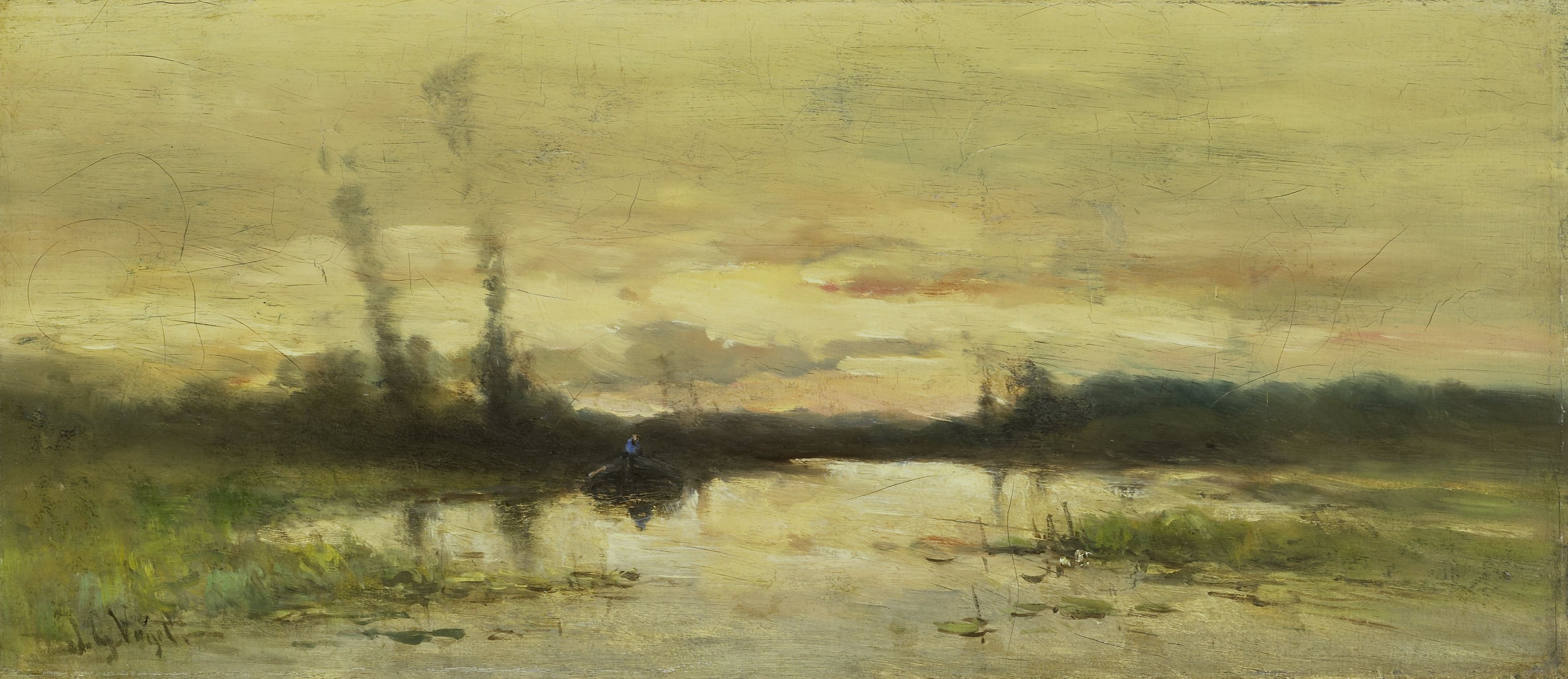
Landscape with a canal near Hilversum

Vogel was born in Hooge Zwaluwe, (Drimmelen), as the son of the local mayor and moved to the Hague, where he became a pupil of Andreas Schelfhout. He became a member of Pulchri Studio and married Maria Henrietta Catherina van Wielik on 26 April 1854. After she died on 4 January 1892 he remarried the painter Margaretha Roosenboom, who was the granddaughter of his former teacher Schelfhout. After she died in 1896 he remarried a third time on 25 March 1902 to Margo Adelaide Eldine Fannij Gaijmans.

Vogel was the brother of architect Hugo Pieter Vogel.

Vogel died in Velp.
