= Terheijden =

- Village
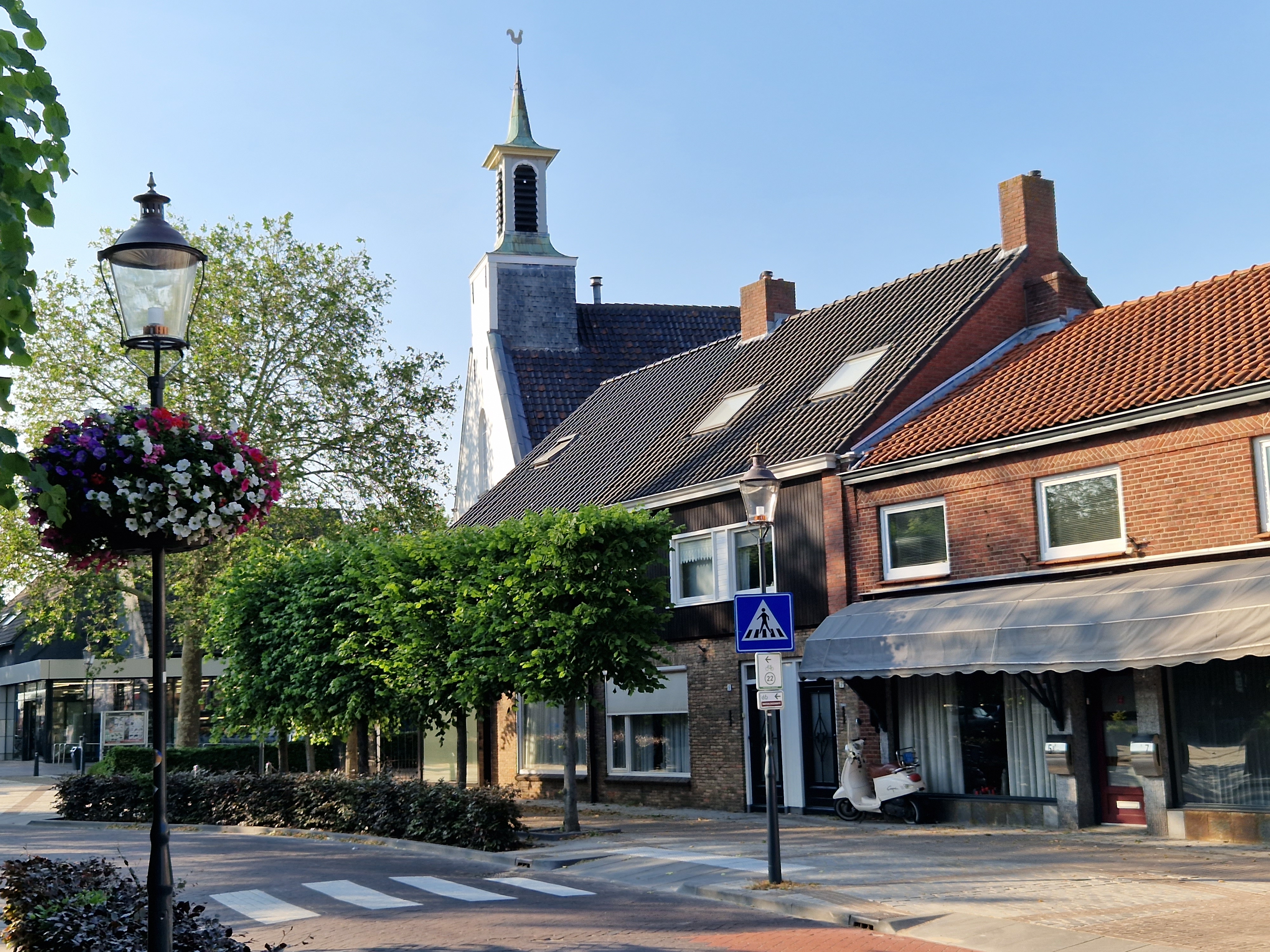
- View of the Protestant Church from the main street

- Flag Coat of arms

- Location in the province of North Brabant in the Netherlands Terheijden (Netherlands)
- Coordinates: 51°38′36″N 4°45′11″E
- Country: Netherlands
- Province: North Brabant
- Municipality: Drimmelen

Area
  - Total: 14.69 km^{2} (5.67 sq mi)
  - Land: 14.34 km^{2} (5.54 sq mi)
  - Water: 0.35 km^{2} (0.14 sq mi)
- Elevation: 2.1 m (6.9 ft)

Population (2021)
  - Total: 6,230
  - Density: 434/km^{2} (1,130/sq mi)
- Time zone: UTC+1 (CET)
  - Summer (DST): UTC+2 (CEST)
- Postal code: 4844
- Dialing code: 076

Terheijden is a village in the Dutch province of North Brabant. It is located in the municipality of Drimmelen, about 6 km north of Breda.

== History ==
The village was first mentioned in 1332 as van der Heyden, and means "(cultivated) heath land". Terheijden started to develop as the road to Breda deteriorated due to flooding. Around 1400, the hamlets of Hartel and Schimmae were given permission to found a church on the heath.

The tower of the St. Antonius Abt church dates from the 15th century. The choir and transept were built around 1500. The church was renovated by Pierre Cuypers in 1876–1878. The church was damaged by fire in 1922, and war in 1944. In 1949, the damage was repaired. The Dutch Reformed church is a little white church dating from 1809.

The Kleine Schans is a sconce built in 1830 as a result of the Belgian Revolution. An earlier sconce was built at the site in 1639 by Spanish troops during the Eighty Years' War, but was demolished in 1680.

Terheijden was home to 886 people in 1840. Terheijden was a separate municipality until 1997, when it became part of Drimmelen.

== Transport ==
- Terheijden is connected to the provincial road N285 and the motorway A59 which runs form 's-Hertogenbosch to Zierikzee as N59.
- From the Marina, a small ferry transfers cyclists and pedestrians across the Mark to the meadows of Haagse Beemden, Breda.

== Gallery ==
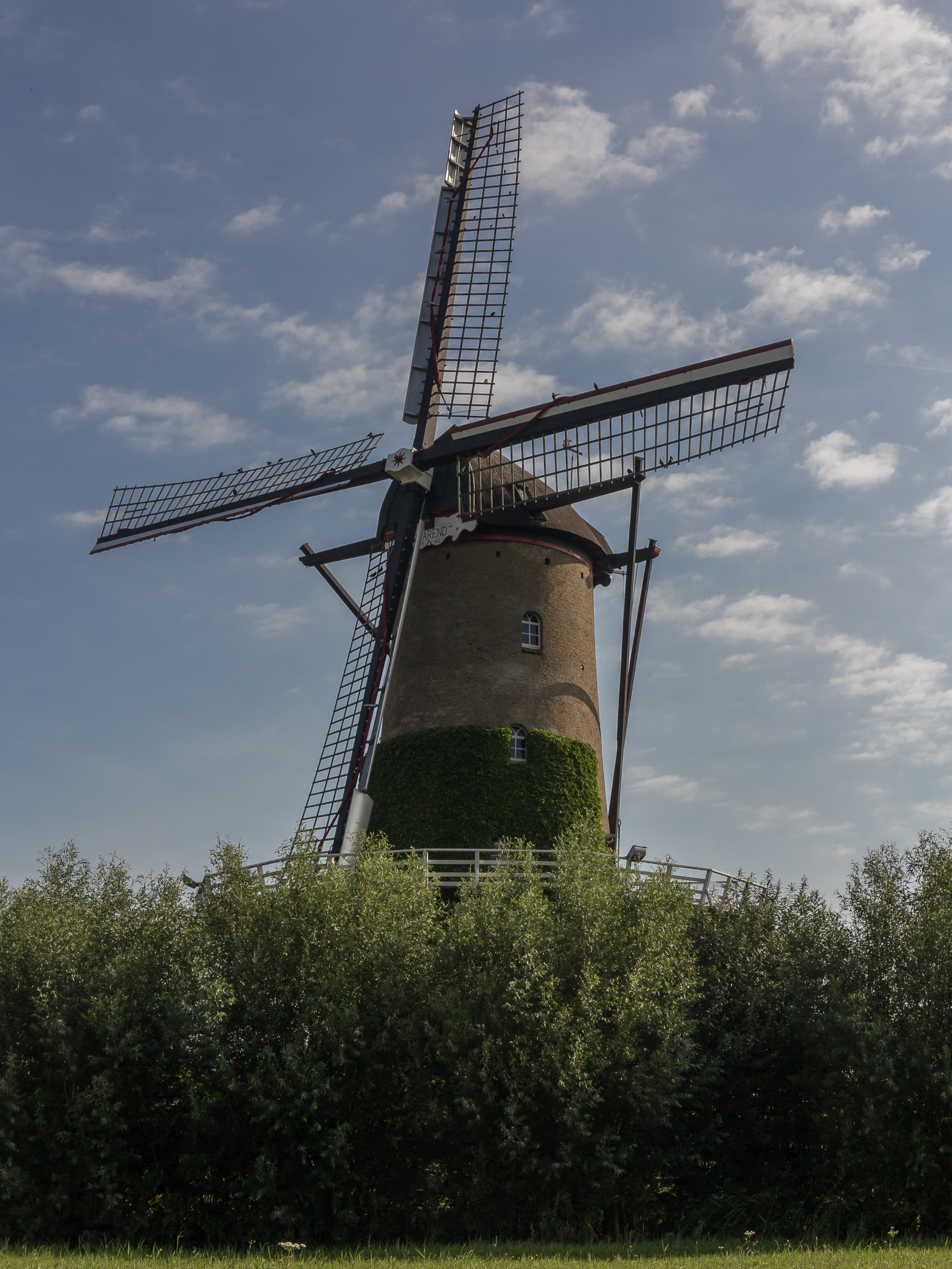
Terheijden, windmill: molen de Arend

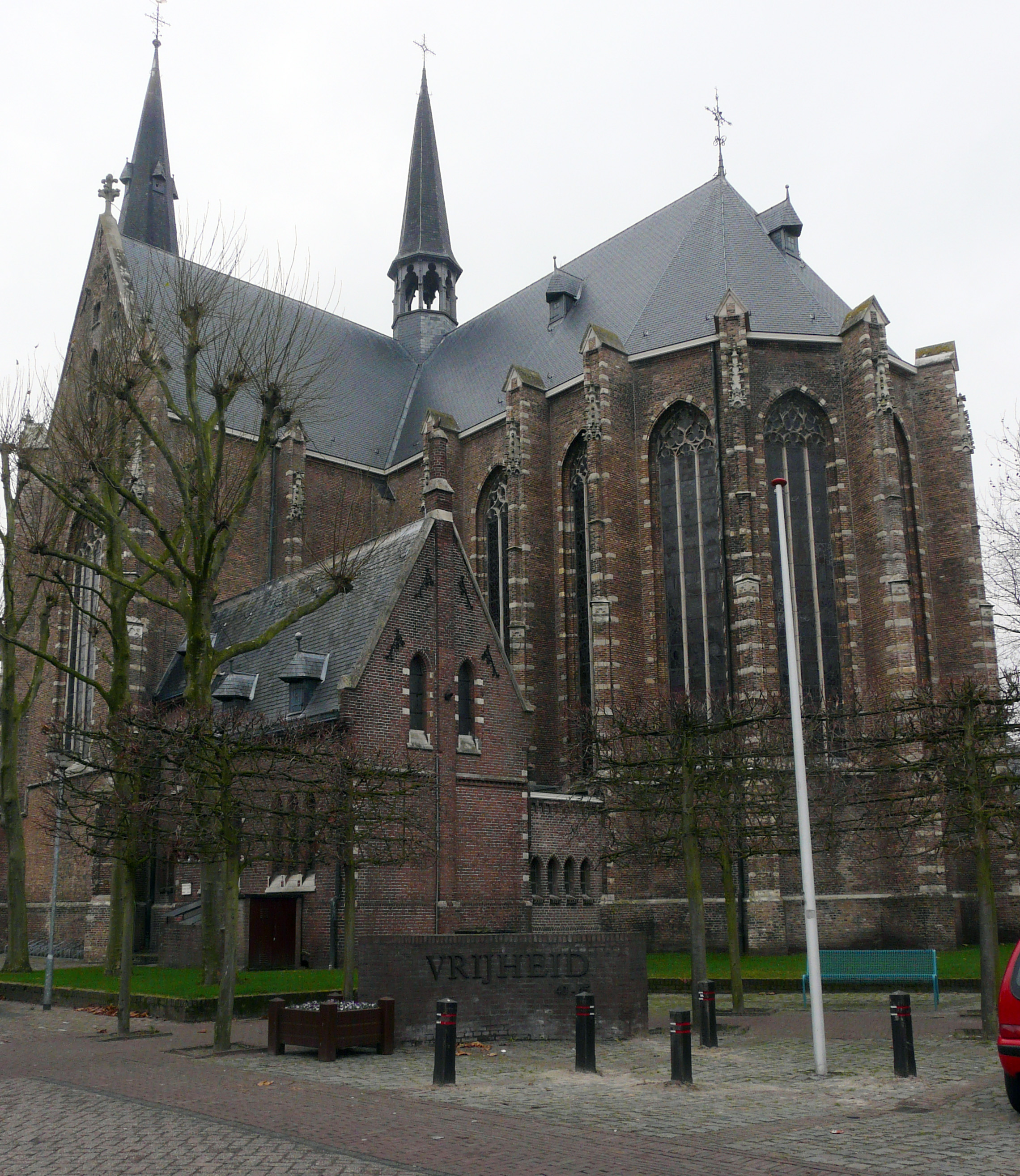
St. Antonius Abt Church

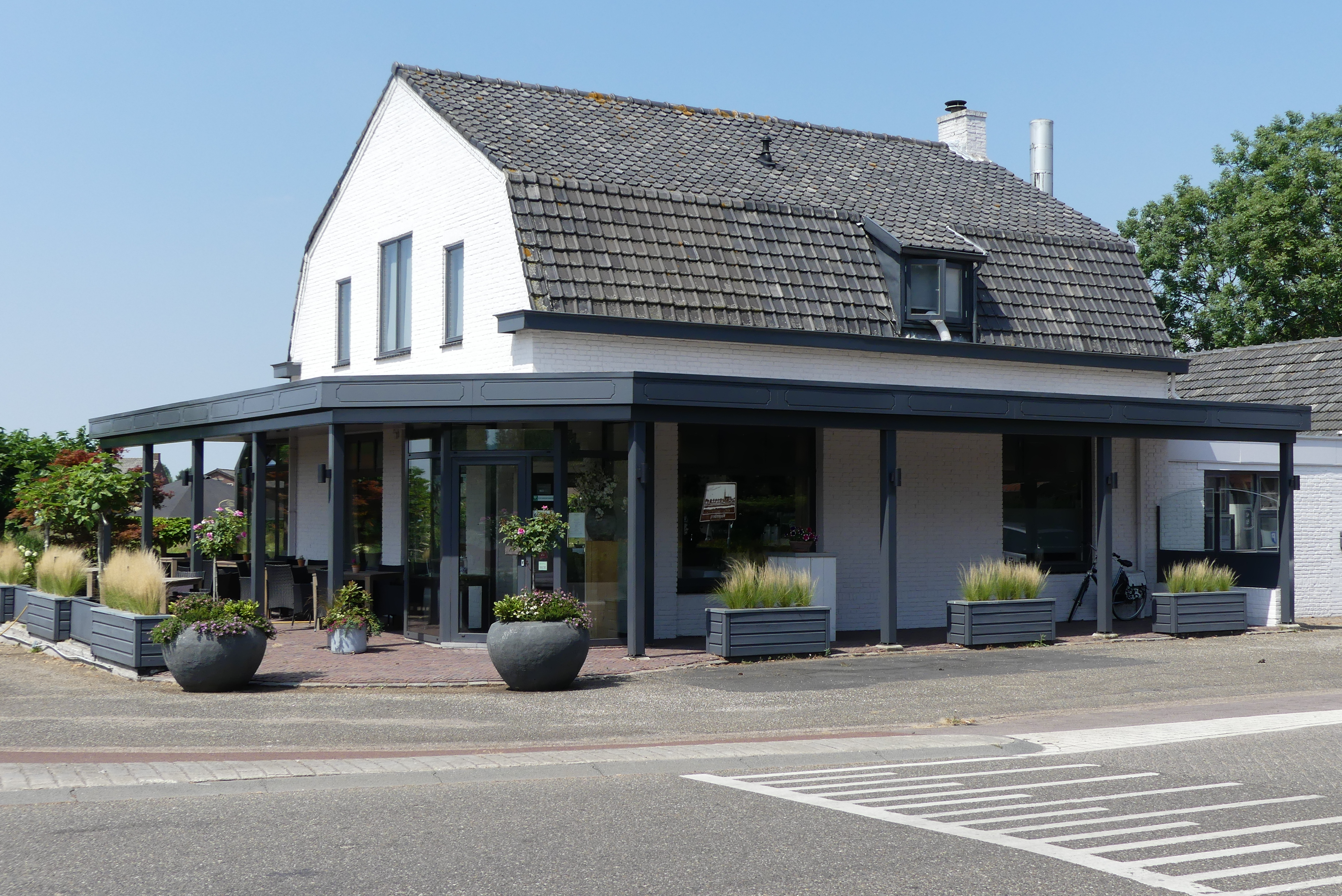
Restaurant in Terheijden

Bridge between Terheijden and Breda
