= Caroline van der Hucht-Kerkhoven =

Dutch writer and activist (1840–1915)

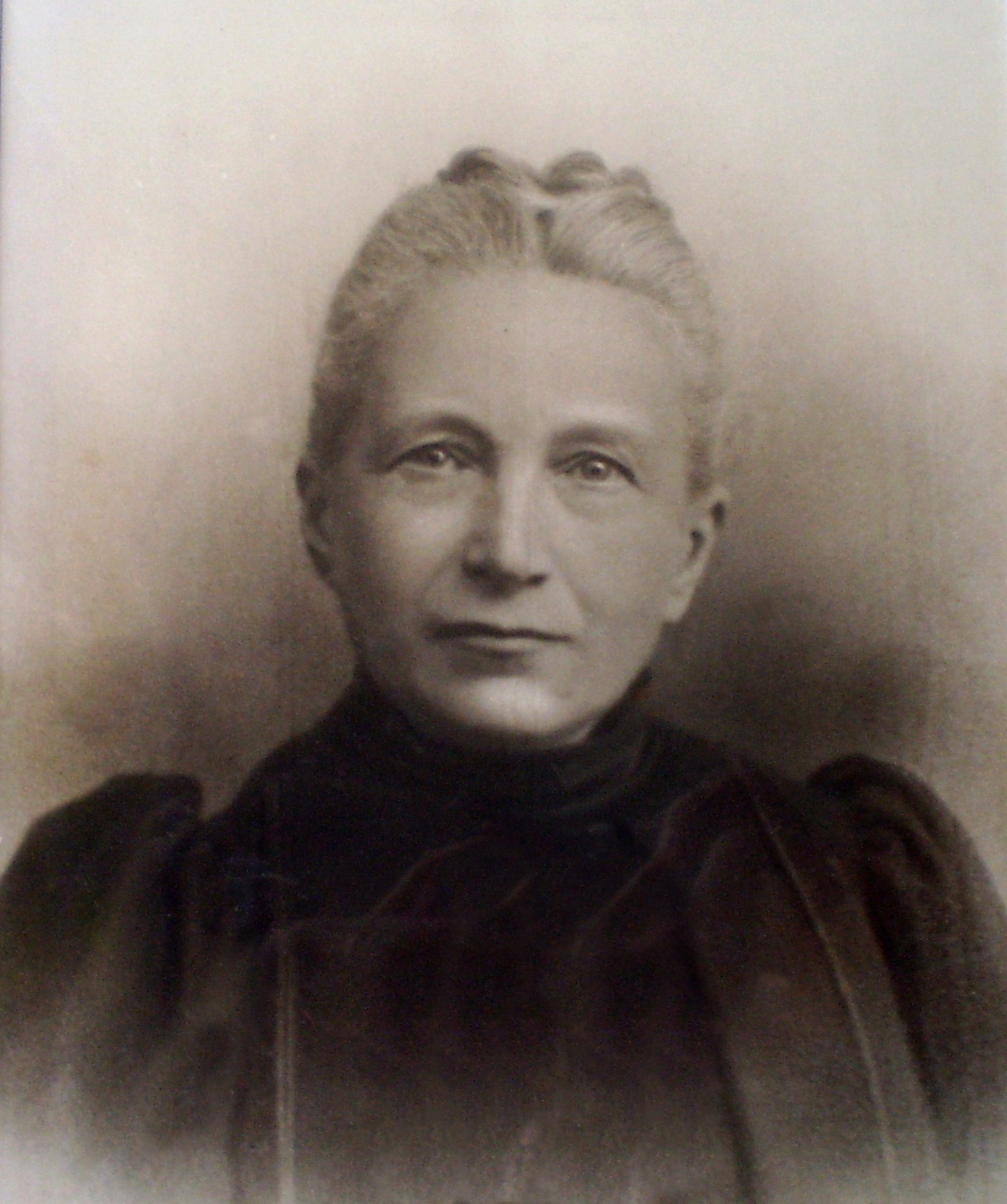
- Born: Caroline Constance Albertine Kerkhoven; 20 January 1840; Amsterdam, Netherlands
- Died: 25 December 1915 (aged 75); Amsterdam, Netherlands
- Other name: Marie Daal (pseudonym)
- Occupations: Writer; editor; philanthropist; activist
- Known for: Activism for animal welfare, vegetarianism, child welfare, and humanitarian reform
- Spouse: Johan Carel van der Hucht (m. 1862; died 1888)

Caroline Constance Albertine van der Hucht-Kerkhoven (née Kerkhoven; 20 January 1840 – 25 December 1915), also known by the pseudonym Marie Daal, was a Dutch writer, editor, philanthropist, and activist. She was involved in animal welfare, vegetarianism, child welfare, and humanitarian reform. She edited the animal welfare magazine Androcles, co-founded the Dutch Anti-Vivisection Society (Nederlandsche Bond ter Bestrijding van Vivisectie) and the Dutch Children's League (Nederlandsche Kinderbond), and established the J. C. van der Hucht Fund, named after her husband.

Van der Hucht-Kerkhoven wrote under the pseudonym Marie Daal. Her novels included Anna (1883) and De familie van Westvoorne ("The Family of Westvoorne"; 1890), both of which addressed animal welfare and anti-vivisection themes.

== Biography ==
=== Early and personal life ===
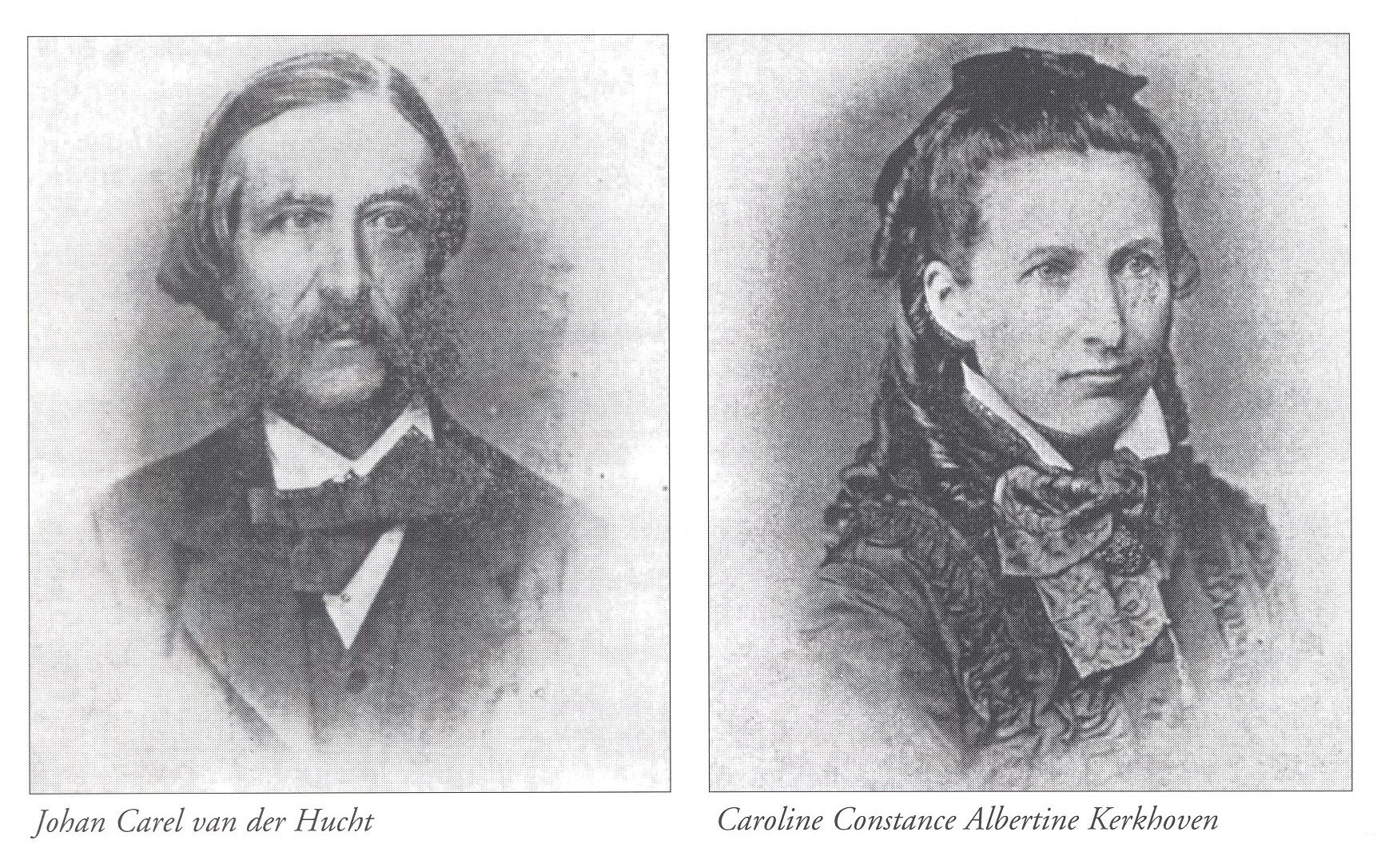
Johan Carel van der Hucht and Caroline van der Hucht-Kerkhoven

Van der Hucht-Kerkhoven was born Caroline Constance Albertine Kerkhoven in Amsterdam on 20 January 1840, the youngest of seven children. Her father, Theodorus Johannes Kerkhoven (1789–1857), was a broker and author, and her mother, Clara Henriëtte van der Hucht (1800–1888), came from a well-established family. Her upbringing was influenced by both Lutheran and Reformed traditions.

On 19 June 1862, she married her cousin Johan Carel van der Hucht (1832–1888), a businessman and banker who later became a director of the Royal Dutch Steamboat Company (KNSM). The couple had no children and lived in Amsterdam, first near the Amstel and later on the Prinsengracht. Because of her husband's poor health, they travelled frequently to health resorts in Germany and to southern France.

=== Activism ===
Van der Hucht-Kerkhoven was involved in humanitarian and animal welfare movements. In 1869, she became editor-in-chief of Androcles, a monthly animal welfare magazine. She supported related causes financially and was a member of the Dutch Society for the Protection of Animals from 1877.

In 1883, under the pseudonym Marie Daal, she published the novel Anna. The novel deals with animal abuse, and the character Meta has been interpreted as a reflection of Van der Hucht-Kerkhoven. The pseudonym Marie Daal may have referred to Mariëndaal, a country estate in Arnhem where her mother was born.

Hanneke Ronnes and Harry Reddick describe Van der Hucht-Kerkhoven as a feminist writer whose fiction presented female protagonists who encounter vivisection and animal cruelty, especially cruelty to cats, and take on public roles in reform work.

In 1890, two years after her husband's death, she co-founded the Dutch Anti-Vivisection Society (Nederlandsche Bond ter Bestrijding van Vivisectie, NBBV). The NBBV published her two-volume novel De familie van Westvoorne ("The Family of Westvoorne") in 1891.

Together with Marie Jungius, she co-founded the Dutch Children's League (Nederlandsche Kinderbond) in 1891, modelled on the British Bands of Mercy. The League taught children compassion for living beings through reading material and club activities. In 1894, she became the first vice-chair of the Dutch Vegetarian Society (Nederlandsche Vegetariërsbond).

=== Humanitarian work ===
Van der Hucht-Kerkhoven was associated with humanitarianism and maintained contacts among pacifists, spiritualists, vegetarians, and Christian anarchists. Felix Ortt, a Christian anarchist and vegetarian, became her personal secretary in 1899.

In 1907, she established the J. C. van der Hucht Fund, named after her husband, with an initial donation of ƒ1,000. The fund was intended to support humanitarian work and included animals within its objects of concern. It helped finance the Engendaal School in Soest, founded in 1913 on neutral humanitarian principles at Ortt's initiative. The school later described its principles as also influenced by Albert Schweitzer.

=== Death ===
Van der Hucht-Kerkhoven lived to see the opening of the Engendaal School in 1913. She died in Amsterdam on 25 December 1915, aged 75.

== Legacy ==
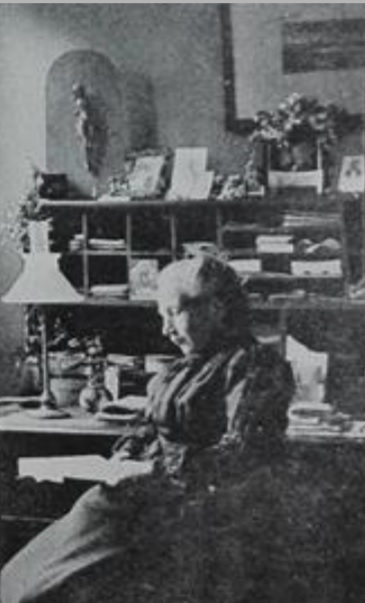
Van der Hucht-Kerkhoven, c. 1905

Van der Hucht-Kerkhoven left a life annuity to Felix Ortt, which allowed him to continue his humanitarian work. She also left money to the Engendaal School, later renamed the Van der Hucht school. Schools under the same educational philosophy were later established in Overhees in 1980 and Smitsveen in 1991.

In 2014, the J. C. van der Hucht Fund merged with the Martina de Beukelaar Foundation to form the Van der Hucht de Beukelaar Foundation, which supports projects concerning the welfare of humans and animals.

== Selected works ==
=== Publications ===
- Anna (novel under the pseudonym Marie Daal; 1883)
- De familie van Westvoorne ("The Family of Westvoorne"; two-volume novel under the pseudonym Marie Daal; 1891)
- Licht en schaduw. Verhalen voor kinderen van verschillenden leeftijd ("Light and Shadow: Stories for Children of Various Ages"; with Jacoba F. D. Mossel; 1906)

=== Collections ===
- Wat mensen zeggen ("What People Say"; children's literature; 1899)
- Uit menschen- en dierenwereld. Verhalen voor groot en klein ("From the World of Humans and Animals: Stories for Young and Old"; 1905)

=== Translations ===
- Eduard Baltzer, Vegetarisch kookboek ("Vegetarian Cookbook"; translated with Daniël de Clercq; 1892)
- Anna Kingsford, Het land aan gene zijde van de zon. Een sprookje voor onzen tijd ("Beyond the Sunset: A Fairy Tale for the Times"; translated allegorical tale; 1895)

== See also ==
- Feminism in the Netherlands
- History of vegetarianism
- Vegetarianism in the Netherlands
- Marie Jungius – Dutch educator, writer, and activist (1864–1908)
- E. M. Valk-Heijnsdijk – Dutch cookbook writer and restaurateur (1867–1945)
