= Marie Jungius =

Dutch educator, writer, and activist (1864–1908)

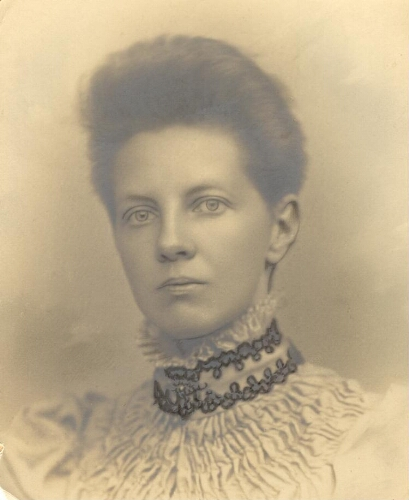
- Jungius in 1897
- Born: Hendrika Maria Aleida Jungius; 1 April 1864; Heiloo, Netherlands
- Died: 22 December 1908 (aged 44); Arnhem, Netherlands
- Resting place: Moscowa Cemetery
- Occupations: Educator; writer; activist
- Known for: Founding director of the Nationaal Bureau voor Vrouwenarbeid; Organising the Nationale Tentoonstelling van Vrouwenarbeid (1898); Activism for women's suffrage, labor rights, children's rights, temperance, animal rights, anti-vivisectionism, and vegetarianism

Signature
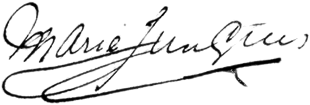

Hendrika Maria Aleida "Marie" Jungius (1 April 1864 – 22 December 1908) was a Dutch educator, writer, and activist. She was involved in women's suffrage, labor rights, children's rights, temperance, vegetarianism, animal rights, and anti-vivisectionism.

After training as a teacher in Haarlem, Jungius taught in Den Helder, Leeuwarden, and The Hague. In 1895, she became private secretary to the children's advocate Caroline Kerkhoven, founder of the Nederlandsche Kinderbond. She joined the board of the Nationale Tentoonstelling van Vrouwenarbeid ("National Exhibition of Women's Labour") in 1896 and helped organise the exhibition, which opened in 1898. In 1901, she became the first director of the Nationaal Bureau voor Vrouwenarbeid ("National Bureau for Women's Labour").

Jungius was also active in the Dutch Vegetarian Association and the Nederlandsche Bond tot bestrijding der Vivisectie ("Dutch Association for Combating Vivisection"). Her writings addressed women's employment, vivisection, child welfare, and humanitarian reform.

== Biography ==
=== Early life and education ===
Hendrika Maria Aleida Jungius was born in Heiloo, Netherlands, on 1 April 1864. Her parents were Elias Cornelis Jungius, a Protestant minister, and Augustina Sophia Carolina Henrijette Hooijkaas. She grew up in Deventer. Her mother died when Jungius was 14.

According to the Biografisch Woordenboek van het Socialisme en de Arbeidersbeweging in Nederland, Jungius was an active child who was interested in gymnastics and outdoor activities. She later recalled noticing differences in the education offered to boys and girls and arguing that young women should also be able to serve as soldiers. She developed an interest in storytelling within her family, preferred mathematics and physics at school, and made a herbarium. Her interest in fairy tales and fantasy later appeared in Verzen ("Verses") and Sprookjes van leven ("Fairy Tales of Life"), both published in 1899.

=== Teaching ===
At 18, Jungius began teacher training in Haarlem. She later taught in Den Helder, Leeuwarden, and The Hague. She lived with her close friend and fellow teacher Suze Groshans.

=== Social reform ===
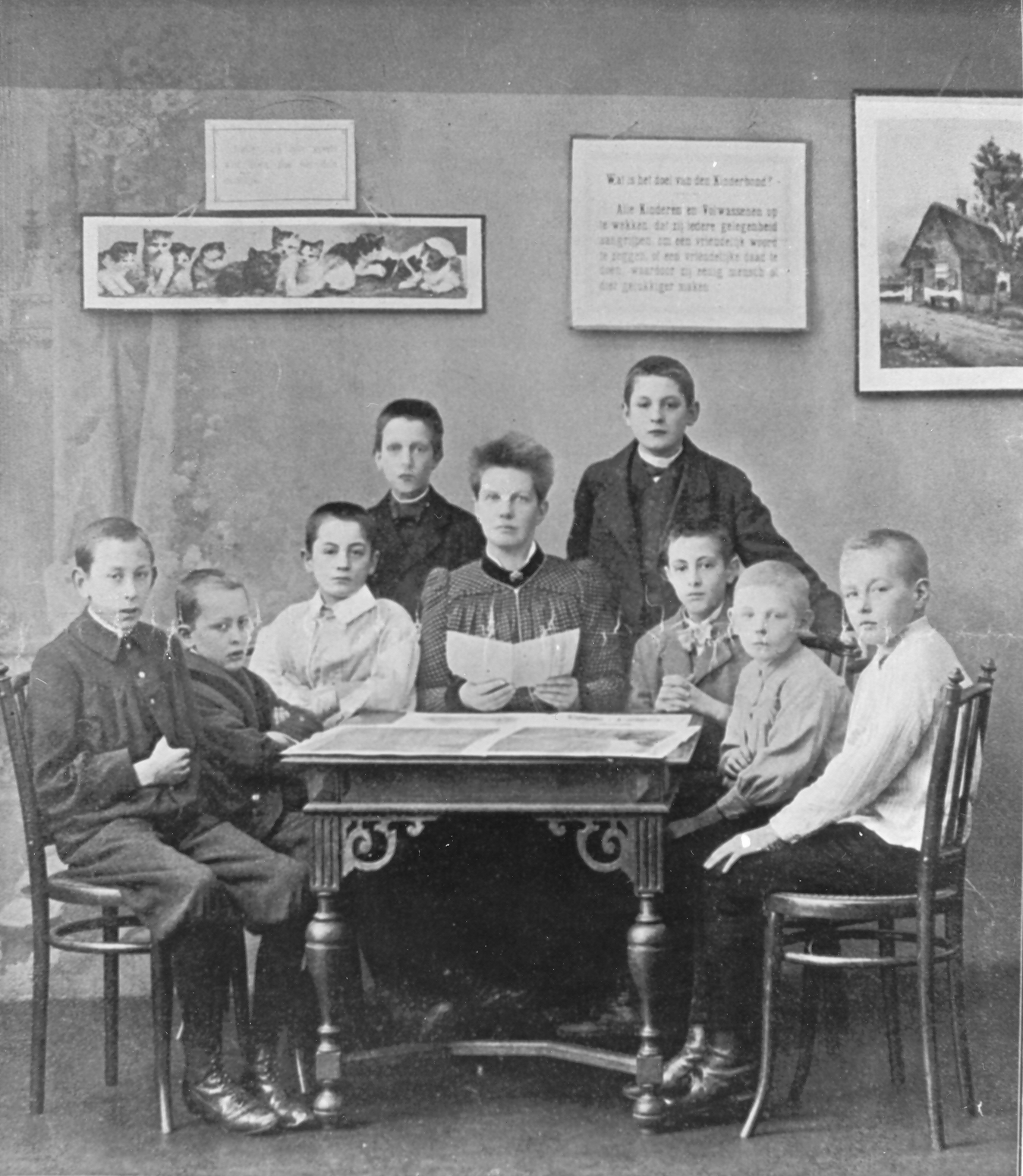
Jungius and one of her clubs of the Nederlandsche Kinderbond ("Dutch Children's Association"), 1890

In 1895, Jungius became private secretary to Caroline Kerkhoven, founder of the Nederlandsche Kinderbond ("Dutch Children's Association"). She helped organise the Congress for Child Protection, held in April 1904 as an initiative of the National Women's Council of the Netherlands.

Jungius was active in suffrage, temperance, and Toynbee work. In 1897, she became president of the Hague branch of the Vereeniging voor Vrouwenkiesrecht ("Association for Women's Suffrage"), serving until 1900. In 1907, she was associated with the moderate feminists who left the association to establish the Nederlandsche Bond voor Vrouwenkiesrecht ("Dutch Association for Women's Suffrage"). Although she had socialist sympathies, she did not join a political party. According to Anna Polak, she disliked political manoeuvring and did not join the SDAP.

=== Women's labour activism ===
In 1896, Jungius joined the board of the Association for the Nationale Tentoonstelling van Vrouwenarbeid ("National Exhibition of Women's Labour"). The exhibition was planned to coincide with Queen Wilhelmina's coming of age in 1898. Jungius worked on the exhibition layout, helped arrange several congresses, and lectured on women's labour.

The exhibition raised 20,000 guilders, which were used to establish the Nationaal Bureau voor Vrouwenarbeid ("National Bureau for Women's Labour") in 1901. Jungius, who had proposed the bureau, became its first director. It conducted research, issued reports, and gave advice on women's employment. During her directorship, the bureau carried out 37 studies on women's working conditions and employment opportunities.

=== Vegetarianism and animal rights activism ===
Jungius was a member of the Dutch Vegetarian Association, founded in 1894. She regarded vegetarianism as part of a wider ethical concern for both humans and animals. She proposed a vegetarian restaurant run by women. E. M. Valk-Heijnsdijk, who had worked at the Pomona vegetarian restaurant in Leipzig, was appointed to manage it.

Jungius was also active in the Nederlandsche Bond tot bestrijding der Vivisectie ("Dutch Association for Combating Vivisection"). She argued for the abolition of vivisection and drew on ethical arguments and medical literature in her criticism of animal experimentation. Chiel van de Kerkhof writes that Jungius connected violence against animals with other forms of social violence, including slavery and torture, and linked anti-vivisection to humanitarian concerns about women and children.

=== Writing ===
Jungius wrote on women's labour, vivisection, child welfare, and humanitarianism. Her publications included Beroepsklapper ("Occupation Index", 1889), a statistical overview of women's employment in the Netherlands; Een woord over de voorgestelde Nationale Tentoonstelling van Vrouwenarbeid ("A Word About the Proposed National Exhibition of Women's Work", 1897); Bestrijding der Vivisectie. Inleiding ("Combating Vivisection. Introduction", 1898); Vivisectie in Nederland ("Vivisection in the Netherlands", 1899); and Wat doet Nederland voor zijn kraamvrouwen? ("What Does the Netherlands Do for Its Postpartum Women?", 1906).

=== Reputation ===
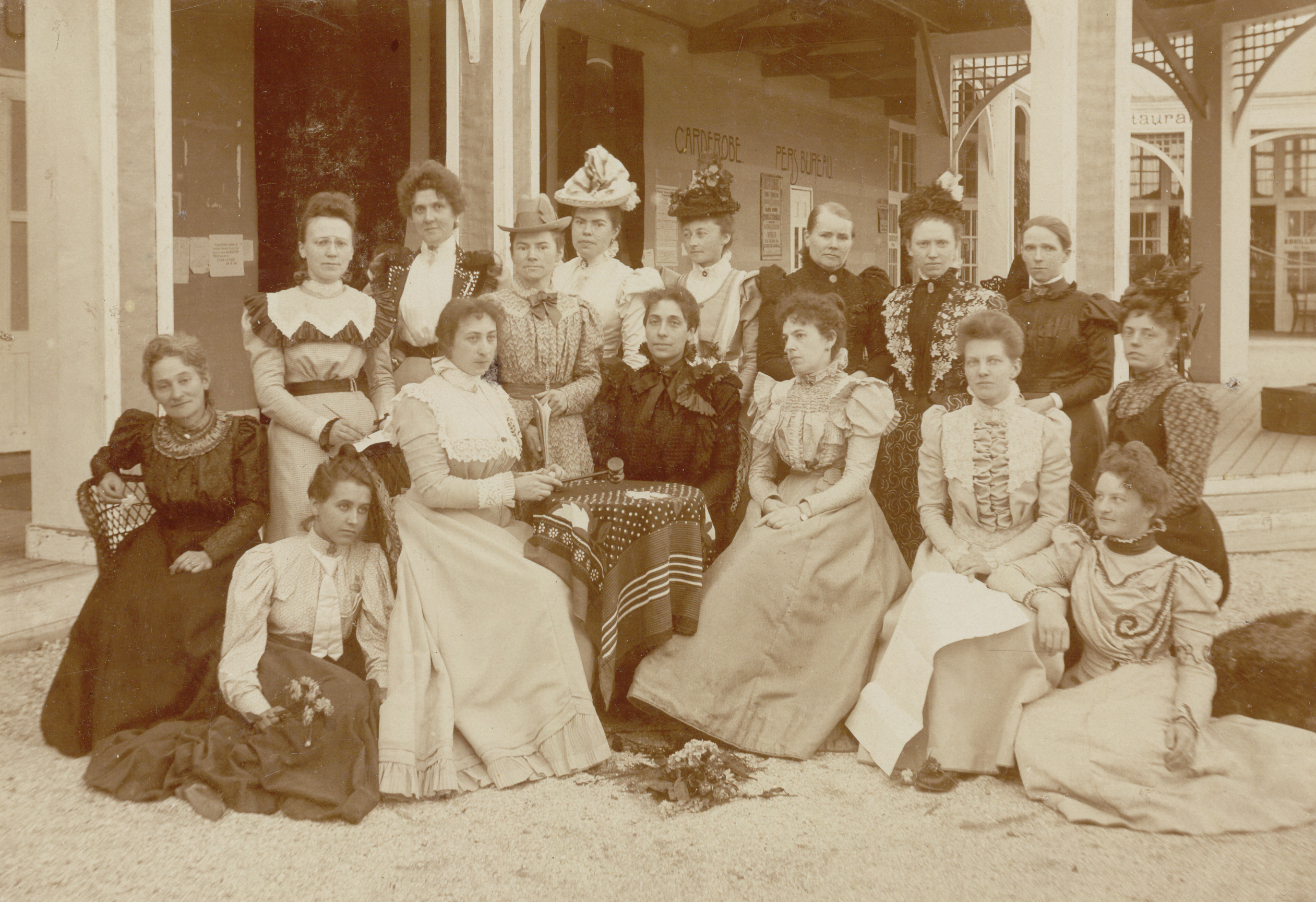
Regulation Committee for the Nationale Tentoonstelling van Vrouwenarbeid ("National Exhibition of Women's Labour") 1898; Jungius is in the front row, second from the right

Jungius was described as slender, with short blond hair and blue eyes. Willemijn Posthumus-van der Goot described her as an effective speaker with a deep voice and a strong concern for women and children. She had recurrent health problems during her life.

=== Death and legacy ===
As her health worsened, Jungius resigned from the National Bureau for Women's Labour in January 1908 and sought treatment for tuberculosis in the Alps. Shortly before her death, she was named honorary president of the bureau. She died in Arnhem on 22 December 1908, and Anna Polak succeeded her as director.

Her funeral took place at Moscowa Cemetery, where Dora Haver, Wilhelmina Drucker, and Anna Polak spoke.

In 1909, Suze Groshans founded the Marie Jungius Fonds ("Marie Jungius Fund") in her memory. The fund supported women recovering from illness or overwork. It was mostly inactive after 1930, but was revived in 1951, when Willemijn Posthumus-van der Goot used it to start the women's advisory service Van vrouw tot vrouw ("From Woman to Woman"). The service operated until 1965.

A street in The Hague, Marie Jungiusweg, was named after her in 1957.

== Publications ==
Jungius published the following works:

- Beroepsklapper ("Occupation Index", 1889)
- Een woord over de voorgestelde Nationale Tentoonstelling van Vrouwenarbeid ("A Word About the Proposed National Exhibition of Women's Work", 1897)
- Bestrijding der vivisectie. Inleiding ("Combating Vivisection. Introduction", 1898) – published in: Nationale Tentoonstelling van Vrouwenarbeid. Besprekingen over Maatschappelijk Werk, pp. 123–151
- Kinderbond en humanitarisme. Inleiding ("Children's League and Humanitarianism. Introduction", 1898) – in the same volume, pp. 227–244
- Verzen ("Verses", 1899)
- Sprookjes van leven ("Fairy Tales of Life", 1899)
- Een woord over het Nationaal Bureau voor Vrouwenarbeid ("A Word About the National Bureau for Women's Employment", 1901)
- De vivisectie is een kwaad en moet daarom uit de samenleving verdwijnen ("Vivisection Is an Evil and Should Therefore Be Removed from Society", 1898)
- De Nederlandsche Kinderbond en de eenheid van alle humanitaire streven ("The Dutch Children's League and the Unity of All Humanitarian Striving", 1899)
- Vivisectie in Nederland ("Vivisection in the Netherlands", 1899)
- Over de onbegrensdheid van ons meegevoel ("On the Limitlessness of Our Compassion", 1900)
- Vrouwenarbeid in de steenfabricage ("Women's Labour in the Brick Industry", 1903)
- De gehuwde vrouw en de veldarbeid ("The Married Woman and Agricultural Labour", 1903)
- Tien jaren arbeidswetgeving ("Ten Years of Labour Legislation", 1903)
- Nachtarbeid der haringspeetsters ("Night Work of Herring Gutters", 1903)
- Waarom halverwege? Een bijdrage tot de kwestie der loodvergiftiging in de aardewerkfabricage ("Why Only Halfway? A Contribution to the Issue of Lead Poisoning in the Pottery Industry", 1904)
- Wenschelijkheid en werkelijkheid. Een bijdrage tot de kennis van het leven der arbeidster-moeder ("Desirability and Reality: A Contribution to the Understanding of the Life of the Working Mother", 1905)
- Wat doet Nederland voor zijn kraamvrouwen? ("What Does the Netherlands Do for Its Postpartum Women?", 1906)
- Eenige opmerkingen aangaande den toestand der magazijn- en winkelbedienden in Nederland ("Some Remarks on the Condition of Store and Shop Assistants in the Netherlands", 1907)
- Verzen en Sprookjes (foreword by Ida Heijermans, 1928) – posthumously published collection

== See also ==
- Atria Institute on Gender Equality and Women's History
- Feminism in the Netherlands
- First-wave feminism
- History of vegetarianism
- Vegetarianism in the Netherlands
- Hendrina Commelin – Dutch feminist and social worker (1843–1917)
- Wil van Gogh – Sister of Vincent van Gogh (1862–1941)
- Caroline van der Hucht-Kerkhoven – Dutch writer and activist (1840–1915)
- E. M. Valk-Heijnsdijk – Dutch cookbook writer and restaurateur (1867–1945)
