= Commelin =

Commelin may refer to:

- Commelin (elm hybrid), a Dutch elm cultivar

== People with the surname ==
- Caspar Commelin (1668–1731), Dutch botanist
- Hendrina Commelin (1843–1917), Dutch social worker and feminist
- Jan Commelin (1629–1692), Dutch botanist
- Isaac Commelin (1598–1676), Dutch historian

== See also ==
- Commelina, commonly called dayflowers
