= Hendrina Commelin =

Dutch feminist and social worker (1843–1917)

Hendrina Hermina Scholten-Commelin (1 March 1843 – 24 November 1917) was a social worker and feminist. The only daughter of Johannes Commelin and Catharina Cornelia Ouwersloot, she married Casper Willem Reinhard Scholten (1839-1914) in Amsterdam on 15 March 1866. The couple had two children: Caspar Wilhelm "Willie" Reinhard (1867-1893) and N. N. Scholten (-). After Willie's death, she and her husband founded the Amsterdam Phytopathological Laboratory in their son's memory. Hendrina is a descendant of botanist Casparus Commelin, founder of the Hortus Botanicus Amsterdam.

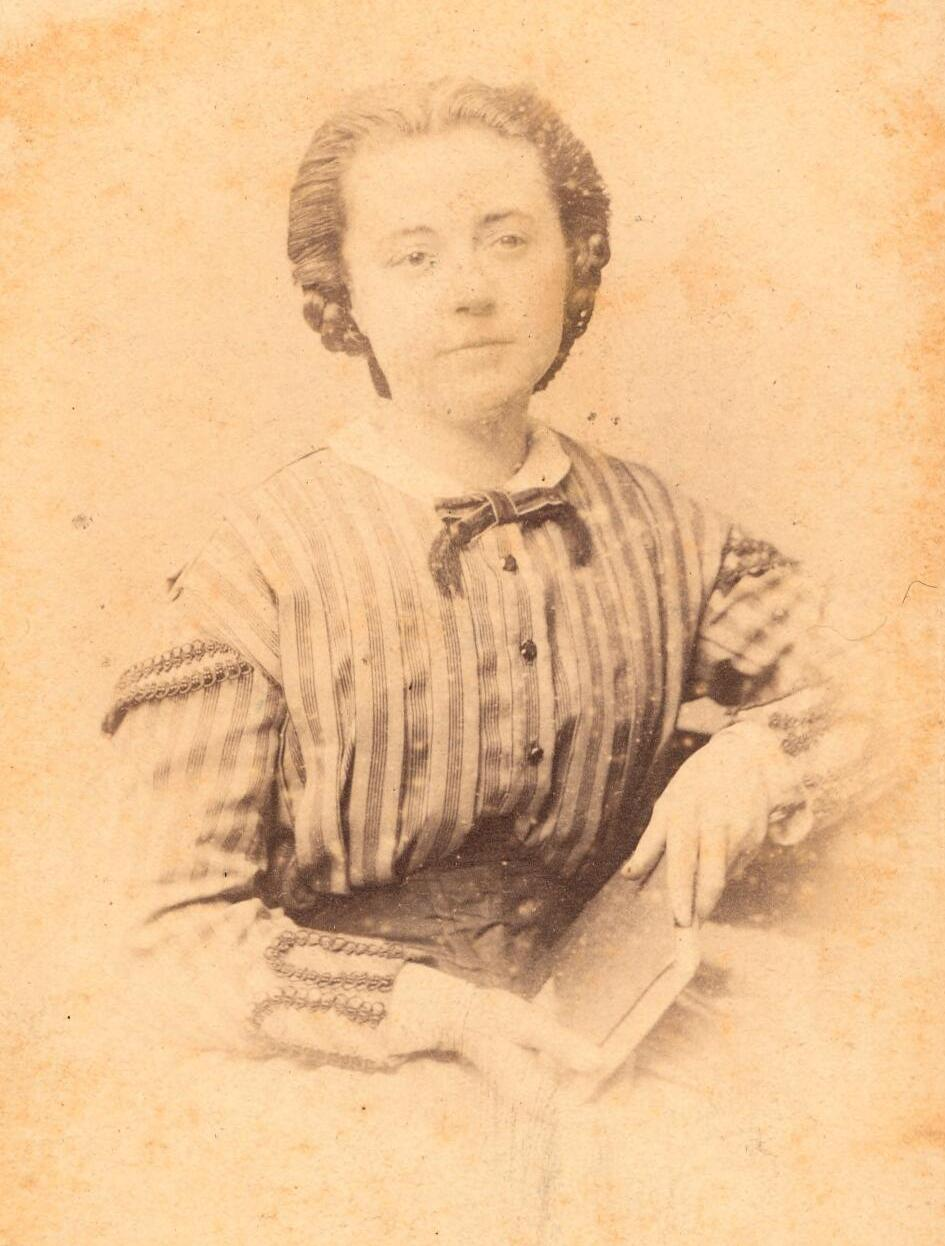

== Household School ==
Along with Jeltje de Bosch Kemper, Hendrina founded the "Amsterdamsche Huishoudschool" in 1890. It was initially intended as a housewife training school for young women, but also served as training for those who would later seek a professional household position. Existing household schools in Belgium and England already visited. The school started in a building on the Prinsengracht. After a few years, Jule Jeltje came to live near the Vondelpark as a backdoor neighbor of Hendrina Scholten. Johannes Scholten bought the land between the two houses and then donated it to the school board of the domestic school. On the plot of land a large school building was built in 1894 by architect C.B. Posthumus Meyjes (1858-1927). This school grew quickly and was visited in 1900 by Queen Wilhelmina with her mother, Regent Emma.

In 1974 the building was converted into a youth hostel.

== Activities ==
Hendrina belonged in 1888 with Helene Mercier, Aletta Jacobs and Jeltje de Bosch Kemper to the committee for workers' labor rights. Together with her husband, she founded the Amsterdam Phytopathological Laboratory, the association Huisverzorging, the Women's Reading Museum, and the people's baths.

=== Women's rights ===
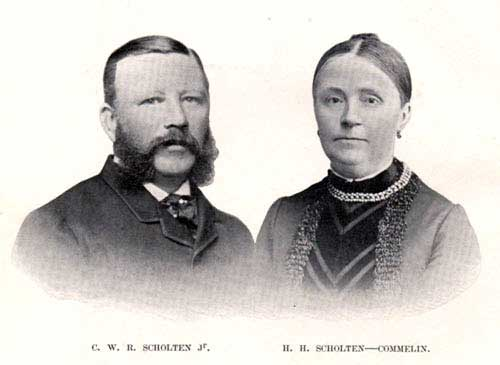

In 1894 she was the founder of the Society for the Improvement of the Social and Legal Status of Women in the Netherlands, an interest group that promoted women's rights.

=== World exhibition ===
As a secretary, Hendrina was a member of the board of the Nationale Tentoonstelling van Vrouwenarbeid ("National Exhibition of Women's Labour") in 1898. The board of the association consisted of three members of the Women's Union Groningen (Cato Pekelharing-Doijer, Dientje Dull and Cateau Worp-Roland Holst), Cécile Goekoop-de Jong and Marie Jungius.
