= Mina Kruseman =

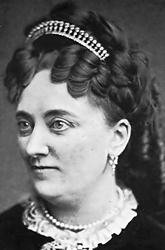
- Wilhelmina Jacoba Pauline Rudolphine Kruseman
- Born: 25 September 1839; Velp, Gelderland
- Died: 1922 (aged 82–83); Paris, France
- Occupations: Writer, singer

Wilhelmina Jacoba Pauline Rudolphine "Mina" Kruseman (25 September 1839 – 1922) was a 19th-century Dutch feminist, actrice and author who used to call herself Oristorio di Frama.

== Youth ==
Mina Kruseman was born in Velp, Gelderland as the oldest of 4 daughters of Hendrik Georg Kruseman (1802-1880) en Jennij Dorotheé Hermine Cornelie Cantzlaar (1810–1859).

H. G. Kruseman, who went on to serve in the Royal Netherlands East Indies Army (KNIL) in the Dutch East Indies, took the family with him. Her growing up with three sisters in Samarang Dutch East Indies had some influence in her later writings. Mina appears to have experienced these years with a sense of freedom; in her autobiography Mijn leven ("My Life") published in 1877, there are several indications of her having had a happy life there. In 1854, the family returned to the Netherlands, where Mina developed a deep aversion against the cold, small-city narrow-minded homeland and the restrictions that were imposed by decency, convention and religion. In her view, women were by far the group most negatively affected by these social norms.

Other than her home country, she also spent a considerable part of her life in Belgium, France and United States.

== Early career ==
Kruseman's open letter to Alexandre Dumas fils

Mina Kruseman wanted to do something special with her life, but initially struggled to find a purpose. In Brussels, where she lived, she was accepted at the Conservatory for voice and piano, but she quit after one year. After the death of two of her sisters, and a discontinued engagement, she decided to be an artist, globe-trotting along stages. She continued her education as a singer in Paris. As she achieved little success in Europe, she decided to go to America in 1871. The start was difficult, but under the alias of Stella Oristorio di Frama, she achieved critical acclaim with several performances in the south of the United States. Karcilla Réna was another pseudonym used by Kruseman. Because of uncertain prospects, she returned to Brussels in the summer of 1872.

In Paris in late July 1872, she wrote her first publication: an open letter in response to a woman-unfriendly pamphlet by Alexandre Dumas fils: Lettre a M. Alexandre Dumas fils au sujet de son livre l'Homme-femme (June 1872), in which Dumas wondered whether women should be killed for adultery or not. (Note: Dumas' pamphlet responded to a high-profile court case in which a man was sent to five years in prison after murdering his unfaithful wife. This caused a lot of commotion in French society, because at the time French law was very lenient to men in such cases. There was even a provision that exonerated a husband who, after catching his wife in the act of adultery with another man, killed his wife in a crime passionel.) Incidentally, Dumas may have coined the term "féministes" ("feminists") in this book by writing: "The feminists, forgive me that neologism, say: All the harm comes from not wanting to recognise that the woman is equal to the man, that she must be given the same education and the same rights as the man." (Note: "Les féministes, passez-moi ce néologisme, disent : Tout le mal vient de ce qu’on ne veut pas reconnaître que la femme est l’égale de l’homme, qu’il faut lui donner la même éducation et les mêmes droits qu’à l’homme.") Through her immediate critical response to Dumas, Kruseman would be the first to embrace the thus-named feminist cause. In 1883, Frederike van Uildriks would similarly credit Kruseman's 1872 lectures with 'the honour of having signalled the start of the women's movement.' She had already written her first novel in America, but it would take some time before it saw publication.

== Kruseman–Perk lectures in Holland ==
She started her career as a performing-artist in Holland. During her first appearance in The Hague November 1872, she read the audience a chapter from her forthcoming feminist novel, Een huwelijk in Indië ("A Marriage in the Dutch East Indies"). From March to May 1873, her fame in the rest of the Netherlands grew as she toured together with Betsy Perk, another Dutch feminist pioneer, with a series of lectures. The two women demanded that girls be given educational opportunities, and unmarried women to be granted the right to work and earn money by themselves. The Kruseman–Perk performances were widely discussed in the press, albeit mostly negatively, but it turned the couple into public personalities overnight. Due to health issues, Perk withdrew from the public eye after the tour, while Kruseman used her new notability in pursuit of her acting career. Other Dutch male authors had made likewise performances, reading from their own writings, into a serious source of income. Kruseman wanted her own economic independence, no chance of a free performance of Mina Kruseman. The text they used: Zusters. Een schetsje uit onze dagen ("Sisters. A sketch from our days.") was written by Kruseman especially for this occasion. It tells the story of 5 almost adult sisters, the education of girls and women's lives afterwards: waiting for a spouse, and when a marriage was not provided, a life as a spinster. Kruseman's tantalizing appearance and her widely acclaimed performance art was quite a happening in the early years of feminist Holland. In addition, Kruseman expressed severe criticism on the level of art-criticism in The Netherlands: real talents were driven out of the country: with Eduard Douwes Dekker, Multatuli as a prominent example.

== Kruseman and Multatuli ==
Dekker was very pleased with this praise. He wrote to his publisher and friend G.L.Funke: I would like to thank her and bring her my compliments Another letter of Dekker – very encouraging – reached Kruseman with the help of Funke. Kruseman had started reading Multatuli's Max Havelaar, during her stay in America. She found in it "strength, feeling and truth". She was inspired by this when she wrote her first novel. In it, she describes the repressive upbringing of girls, to makes them ready for marriage, and all the duties thereafter. Kruseman had a lot more in common with Dekker, his thoughts about morals, religion, his humor, and his fight for the weak in society. The criticism made to her, that she was too much under Dekker's influence, she did not mind that at all, just found it a biggest compliment ever. The day, she got Dekker's letter, she immediately replied to him: No letter, from anybody else, could have made me more happy, than yours A few months later, she visited Dekker in Wiesbaden Germany, together with her feminist friend Betsy Perk.

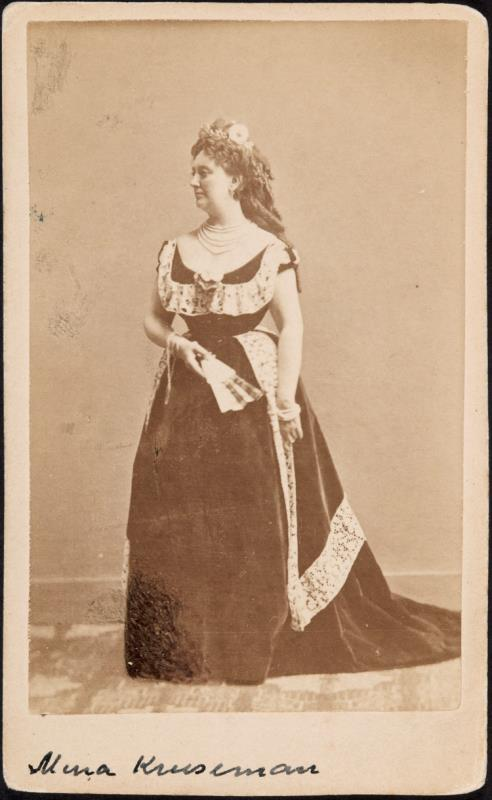
Mina Kruseman (1875)

This was the start of a close friendship between Eduard Douwes Dekker and Mina Kruseman. Kruseman desired to be an actrice, so she started a lobby to bring Dekker's play Vorstenschool (School of Princes) into the theatre. This play was published years before in 1872, as the start of IDEEN-IV. Although the play raised much attention, no theatre company in Holland dared to start with it. In 1875 Kruseman managed to sign a contract with a starting theatre company in Rotterdam "De nieuwe Rotterdamsche Schouwburg". Kruseman played for some time the leading role as queen Louise. The tour was a big success. Multatuli was recognised and celebrated as a big author, he was asked on stage and applauded by the audience. Even raised ticket prices did not keep people away. However, it would also become the source of hatred between Kruseman and Dekker in their later lives. After some time Kruseman discovered that another actrice, Nans Sandrock-ten Hagen, of the group was preparing to take over her Louise-role. Although at first this was denied, soon Kruseman was put aside. Her claim of 3000 gulden, was denied to her on 4 May 1875 by the Rotterdam court. The new "Louise" had only little success and the tour came to an end.

== Autobiography publication ==
Kruseman was furious about how Multatuli had sidelined her, as she sought to prove that it was only thanks to her efforts that the play could even be performed in the first place. To convince public opinion of her point of view, she published lengthy quotations from her personal correspondence with Multatuli; these not only revealed that he did admire her acting talent initially, but also hinted at having had amorous feelings for Kruseman, which she rebuffed as she was only interested in 'friendship'.

The publication of personal letters, especially of living people, was considered highly inappropriate in the 1870s; indeed, any personal documents were usually only published posthumously. But the changing nature of society, in which opinion pieces were printed and spread much faster with new inventions such as the rotary printing press, forced public personalities to take personal control over their image to restore their damaged reputation. In addition, publishing personal information, usually in the form of an autobiography, also emerged as a new way of making money that was becoming more acceptable ever since Rousseau's 1780s Confessions. Both Kruseman and Perk thus published their autobiographies in the 1870s, long before they died, to restore their reputations, and earn a living in the process. Although some critics argued it was inappropriate to publicly defend oneself against defamation (which some considered a 'confession of guilt'), and many friends and relatives of Kruseman and Perk urged them to henceforth write anonymously to prevent further scandals, the women had virtually no other options to earn a living exactly because their names had been blemished, and so they wrote their autobiographies to simultaneously rehabilitate themselves and stay financially afloat. Kruseman in particular emphasised her copyright as the author of her writings, and to receive royalty payment for any subsequent reprints, which some publishers tried to pocket for themselves.

Mina Kruseman published her three-volume autobiography Mijn leven ("My Life") in 1877, to close her time in Holland. Multatuli... He had always insisted, that he never had admired her, never had he any faith attached to her acting talent. Now it appeared all too obvious to the contrary. She had left a bomb for all her sworn enemies, but did not wait at all for the critics. On 1 September 1877 she said good bye to Holland and went to the Dutch East Indies for the rest of her life until her death in 1922 she never touched Dutch soil.

In one of the last pages of her book she wrote: I can look back on my past without repentance, I am happy with my present, my future I will meet without illusions, but also without fear. What more do you want?

== A feminist in the tropics ==
Newspapers in the Dutch colonies were informed about the arrival of Kruseman. On 12 October 1877 the Algemeen Dagblad van Nederlands Indie mentions the plans of Kruseman to come and stay for 10 years. On 18 October she arrived with the Princes Amalia of the Nederlandsche Stoombootmaatschappij in Batavia. At that moment also copies of her book Mijn leven were available. Soon the first reviews were published. Many blame her indiscretion, superficial, overconfidence, but usually it is considered rather positive.

== Final years ==
In 1881, she met writer, photographer, and musician Frits J. Hoffman, a former pupil of Kruseman who was 22 years old while Mina Kruseman was in her forties. The large size of Kruseman's house allowed them to keep their relationship secret from the local community. The couple left the Dutch East Indies in 1883, and during their voyage to Europe, their daughter was born. On November 5, 1883, the Soerabaya Courant announced both the birth and the "marriage" of Mina and Frits, though no record of their marriage appears in Singapore's marriage registers from this period. According to Kruseman, they spent three and a half years living in Naples, where a second daughter was born. Both children died young. The couple eventually settled in Boulogne-sur-Seine, a Parisian suburb that merged with Billancourt to become present-day Boulogne-Billancourt. They supported themselves through Hoffman's work as a photographer and violin teacher. After he lost his photography work, they relied on his music lessons and Mina Kruseman's annuity. Following Hoffman's death in 1918, Kruseman's health deteriorated significantly. She became infirm and rarely left her house after 1920. She died in 1922 at the age of 82.

For her role as feminist she was honored by a large number of municipalities in the Netherlands, that have named a street after her including: Arnhem, Coevorden, Delft, Enschede, Hoorn, Leiden, Spijkenisse, Tiel, Venray, Venlo, Tilburg, Waalwijk, Zaanstad, a lane in Deventer, a channel in Veenendaal, a road in Tilburg or a square in Dordrecht.

== Published works ==
- Lettre a M. Alexandre Dumas fils au sujet de son livre l'Homme-femme ("Letter to Mr Alexandre Dumas fils on the subject of his book l'Homme-femme"): Paris, 1872
- Een huwelijk in Indië ("A marriage in the Dutch East Indies"): The Hague, 1873
- De moderne Judith ("The modern Judith"): Dordrecht, 1873
- Meester Kritiek ("Master of Criticism"): Middelburg, 1874
- Mijn leven ("My Life"): Dordrecht, 1873
- Willen en handelen ("Desires and Actions"): Fellah Damstone, Dordrecht, 1879

== Bibliography ==
- Huisman, Marijke (October 2006). "Het persoonlijke is commercieel. De autobiografieën van Betsy Perk en Mina Kruseman" (PDF). Historica. 29 (3): 9–11.
- Mooij, Annet (2013). Branie: het leven van Mina Kruseman. Amsterdam: Uitgeverij Balans. p. 284. ISBN 9789460036149.
