= Clasine Neuman =

Dutch painter (1851–1908)

Clasina Carolina Frederica Neuman (10 February 1851, in Amsterdam – 2 November 1908, in The Hague) was a Dutch painter, best remembered for her still lifes, portraits, and genre paintings. Her works are in the collections of the Kunstmuseum Den Haag, the Frans Hals Museum, the Haagse Kunstkring, and were exhibited in her own lifetime at the Exhibition of Living Masters and the Nationale Tentoonstelling van Vrouwenarbeid 1898. A member of the Arti et Amicitiae, she thrice failed to get in to the Pulchri Studio.
