= Bertha Waszklewicz-van Schilfgaarde =

Dutch peace activist and journalist

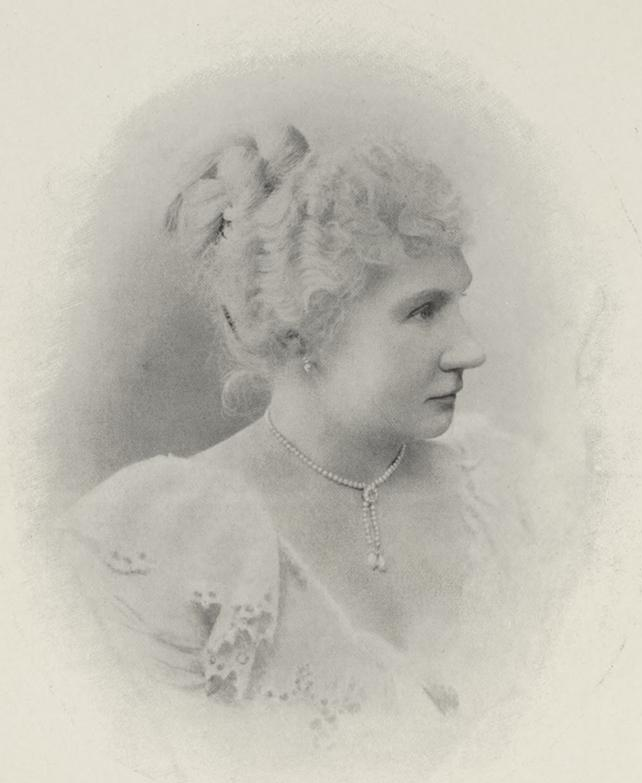
- Born: Johanna Maria Cornelia Bertha van Schilfgaarde; 7 November 1850; Zoeterwoude
- Died: 13 December 1937 (aged 87); The Hague
- Occupations: Peace activist, journalist, editor

Johanna Maria Cornelia Bertha Waszklewicz-van Schilfgaarde (7 November 1850 in Zoeterwoude – 14 December 1937 in The Hague) was a Dutch peace activist and journalist.

== Biography ==
Bertha van Schilfgaarde was born into a wealthy noble family. She was the daughter of Jan Johannes van Schilfgaarde (1819–1864) and Catharina Cornelia van den Es (1819–1864). She grew up at the Huize Delfzicht in Zoeterwoude. Schilfgaarde studied both French and English in secondary school, and took up an interest in language at an early age. At the age of twenty-two, she married Jan Isaak Joseph Levijssohn, a physician. four years later, in 1977, this marriage was dissolved. In 1885, she remarried to Count Adam Ernest Wasklewicz, a retired colonel.

After reading the works of Louis Couperus, she became interested in the pacifist movement. Couperus' book, Wereldvrede (World Piece,) sparked her interest in international law and the peace movement. In 1898, she became president of the Dutch section of the Women's League for International Disarmament. In the same year, she became president of the Dutch Women's Union for International Disarmament.

In 1900, she expressed deep concern regarding the Second Boer War. In 1901, she published a plea calling for the creation of a neutral zone in South Africa where women and children could be brought to safety for the remainder of the wars duration. Later that year, she went to London to protest British action against the Boers. The protest was unsuccessful in its goal, but opponents of the war praised her actions.

On January 17, 1901, her husband died. Shortly after, she left the Women's Union when it merged with the Algemeene Nederlandsche Vredesbond. When the Boer War ended, she left for Rome, became Roman Catholic and founded the International Catholic Institute research. Under the pen name B. Teresia Pia Waszklewicz-van Schilfgaarde, she wrote articles on questions of faith. She would spend her later years translating the work of Francis Grierson into Dutch. Near the end of her life, she returned to the Netherlands settled in The Hague. She died on December 14, 1937, at the age of 87.

== Publications ==
- Open brief aan Felix Ortt : een woord tot de Tolstoïanen en christelijk-anarchisten, Amsterdam, Versluys, 1899
- Frédéric Passy, Haarlem, Tjeenk Willink & zoon, 1900
- « Paul Kruger's tocht. Getrouwe beschrijving van oom Paul's bezoek aan Frankrijk, de Rijnprovincie en Nederland », La Haye, 15 April 1900
- « Plea for the Grant of a Neutral Territory for the Boer Women and Children », 1901
- Carmen Pro Invictis, Waszklewicz-Van Schilfgaarde, Bertha (éd.), La Haye, N. Veenstra, 1901 — recueil de poèmes Protestant contre la poursuite anglaise de la guerre des Boers, principalement en français, don't *ceux de Sully Prudhomme
- Romeinsche Kronijk, Amsterdam, C. L. Van Langenhuysen, 1905 (lire en ligne (archive))
- Het dogma der heilige eucharistie in de Romeinsche catacomben, en andere documenten der eerste eeuwen, Amsterdam, Borg, 1906
- Maria in de eerste tijden der Kerk, Nimègue, Malmberg, 1911
- Sancta Melania de Jongere : Romeinsche senatrix, avec Mariano Rampolla del Tindaro, Leiden, Van Leeuwen, 1911
- Nova et vetera : apologetische brieven aan een modern Protestant, Baarn, Hollandia, 1912
