= Codien Zwaardemaker-Visscher =

Dutch writer, translator and feminist (1835–1912)

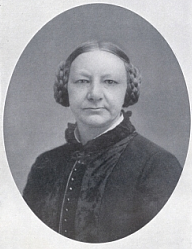
- Born: Jacobina Berendina Visscher; 5 May 1835; Utrecht, Netherlands
- Died: 4 August 1912 (aged 77); Utrecht, Netherlands
- Occupations: Writer, translator and feminist
- Spouse: Cornelis Zwaardemaker (m. 1856)
- Children: 3
- Writing career
- Notable works: Ada Bermuda (1881); Tante Agathe's voogdijschap, Onwettig toch recht (1897)

Jacobina Berendina Zwaardemaker-Visscher (5 May 1835 – 4 August 1912), more commonly known by her pseudonym Codien Zwaardemaker-Visscher, was a Dutch writer, translator, editor and feminist.

== Early life and family ==
Zwaardemaker-Visscher was born on 5 May 1835 in Utrecht, Netherlands. Her parents were Mennonite pastor Jan Visscher and Lumina Visscher (née Loos).

Zwaardemaker-Visscher was educated at the day school the Van Breemen sisters then at home. Her two brothers received further education, becoming a notary and a preacher, and she found her comparative lack of education frustrating. She wrote in 1898 that she "sighed often among endless embroidery and frequent cup washing: och, if only I were one boy, then I could also study as my brother and become a pastor!."

Zwaardemaker-Visscher married the bookseller, publisher and editor of the Nieuwsblad voor den Boekhandel trade publication Cornelis Zwaardemaker on 8 August 1856 in Utrecht, Netherlands. They had three sons together, one of whom died in infancy.

== Career ==
Zwaardemaker-Visscher's first publication was the brochure Over opvoeding en emancipatie van der vrouw (1869), which covered girls' education. She initially wrote under the pseudonym "Codien," a form of her husbands given name. From 1871, she no longer published under a pseudonym, consciously choosing to use her own name as it was important to her that a woman could publish as an independent individual.

Zwaardemaker-Visscher contributed to women's magazines, including Dutch magazine Onze Roeping and the British magazine Woman. With her husband, Zwaardemaker-Visscher edited trilingual children's magazine Trio. Journal amusant en trois langues: français, anglais, allemand, pour la jeunesse from 1868 to 1871.

Zwaardemaker-Visscher's novels Ada Bermuda (1881) and De ruïne van den Oldenborgh (1885) both advocated for women's right to education and to hold public office. Her novel Tante Agathe’s voogdijschap, Onwettig toch recht (1897) explored the idea that women should have the right to exercise legal guardianship over children. She also opposed the requirement of docility and obedience in legal marriage in her writings.

As a translator, Zwaardemaker-Visscher translated novels and short stories from German and English into Dutch. Her translations included works by George Eliot, Louisa May Alcott and Mrs. Compton Reade.

== Death and legacy ==
Zwaardemaker-Visscher died on 4 August 1912 in Utrecht, Netherlands, aged 77.

Zwaardemaker-Visscher was a member of the Leesmuseum voor Vrouwen in Amsterdam. Two autographed pictures of her are held in the collection of the Letterkundig Museum in The Hague.

Zwaardemaker-Visscher's niece Rinskje Visscher was the first female municipal archivist in the Netherlands.

== Publications ==
- Ada Bermuda (1881)
- De ruïne van den Oldenborgh (1885)
- Grootmoeder. Eene familiegeschiedenis (1892)
- Sterk in leed. Een familieroman (1894)
- Tante Agathe’s voogdijschap, Onwettig toch recht (1897)
