= Anna Reijnvaan =

Dutch nurse

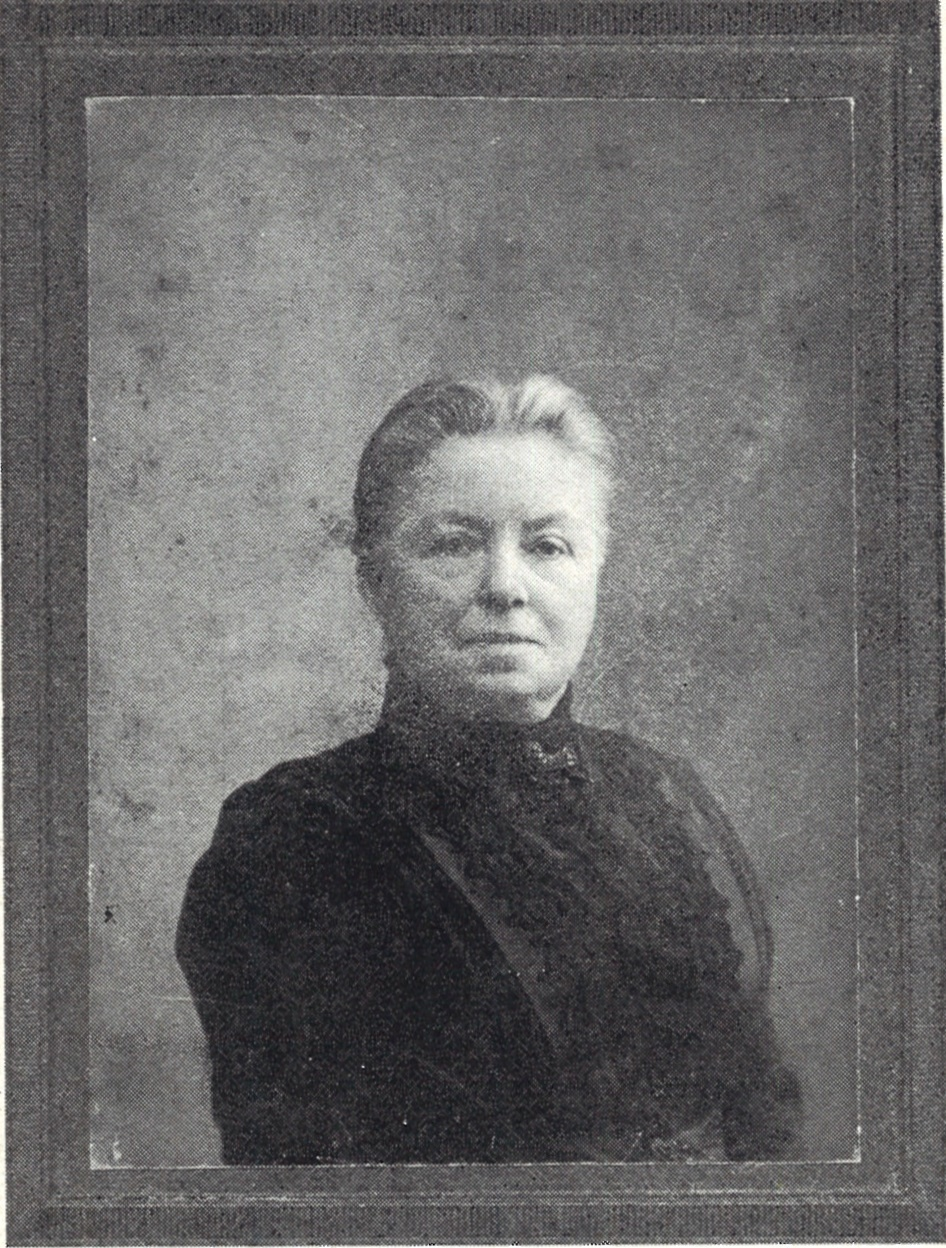
Anna Reynvaan

Anna Reynvaan (5 April 1844 – 19 March 1920), was a Dutch nurse and a pioneer within the nursing profession in the Netherlands.

Reynvaan was the first professionally trained nurse in the Netherlands.

She was born Johanna Paulina Reynvaan. Her father was a tobacco merchant and her mother died when she was ten years old; during the Franco-Prussian War she expressed an interest in nursing, but was not able to do so at that time as she did not have her father's permission.

Reynvaan was educated at the first Nursing School opened in 1878 at the initiative of Jeltje de Bosch Kemper, who wished to introduce the profession of the educated medical nurse in the Netherlands. Reynvaan graduated as a nurse in 1880 and was, as such, the first professionally trained nurse of her nation. She was employed at the hospital Amsterdam Binnengasthuis, where the caregivers had until then lacked formal education.

Alongside the progressive physician Jacob van Deventer, she became known for her work to introduce modern hygiene and method in the hospital care, a work that was to become successful. She also engaged as a pioneer educator in the new nursing education in her country. She was made deputy director of the Buitengasthuis hospital in 1883.

She also engaged as a pioneer educator in the new nursing education in her country, teaching the practical component of the new nursing course taught at Buitengasthuis; during this time, Van Deventer’s wife Antontia Stelling became the first person to gain a diploma in psychiatric nursing.

She and Kemper later founded the Journal for Nursing for the Sick; Reynvaan also wrote an autobiographical novel, Zuster Clara: Schetsen uit het leven eener verpleegster in een stedelijk gasthuis ("Sister Clara: Sketches from the life of a nurse in an urban hospital").

In 1891, Reynvaan and Kemper arranged the first conference on nursing, named "The Gathering"; however no women were allowed to deliver speeches at the conference.

== Legacy ==
The Amsterdam University Medical Center runs an annual nursing conference named the Anna Reynvaan Event.

The Anna Reynvaan Prize is awarded to nurses who show outstanding work to improve patient care through science.

The city of Hengelo has a street named after Reynvaan; there is a psychiatric hospital at Anna Reynvaanweg 54.
