= Jeltje de Bosch Kemper =

19th-century Dutch feminist (1836 – 1916)

Jonkvrouw Jeltje de Bosch Kemper
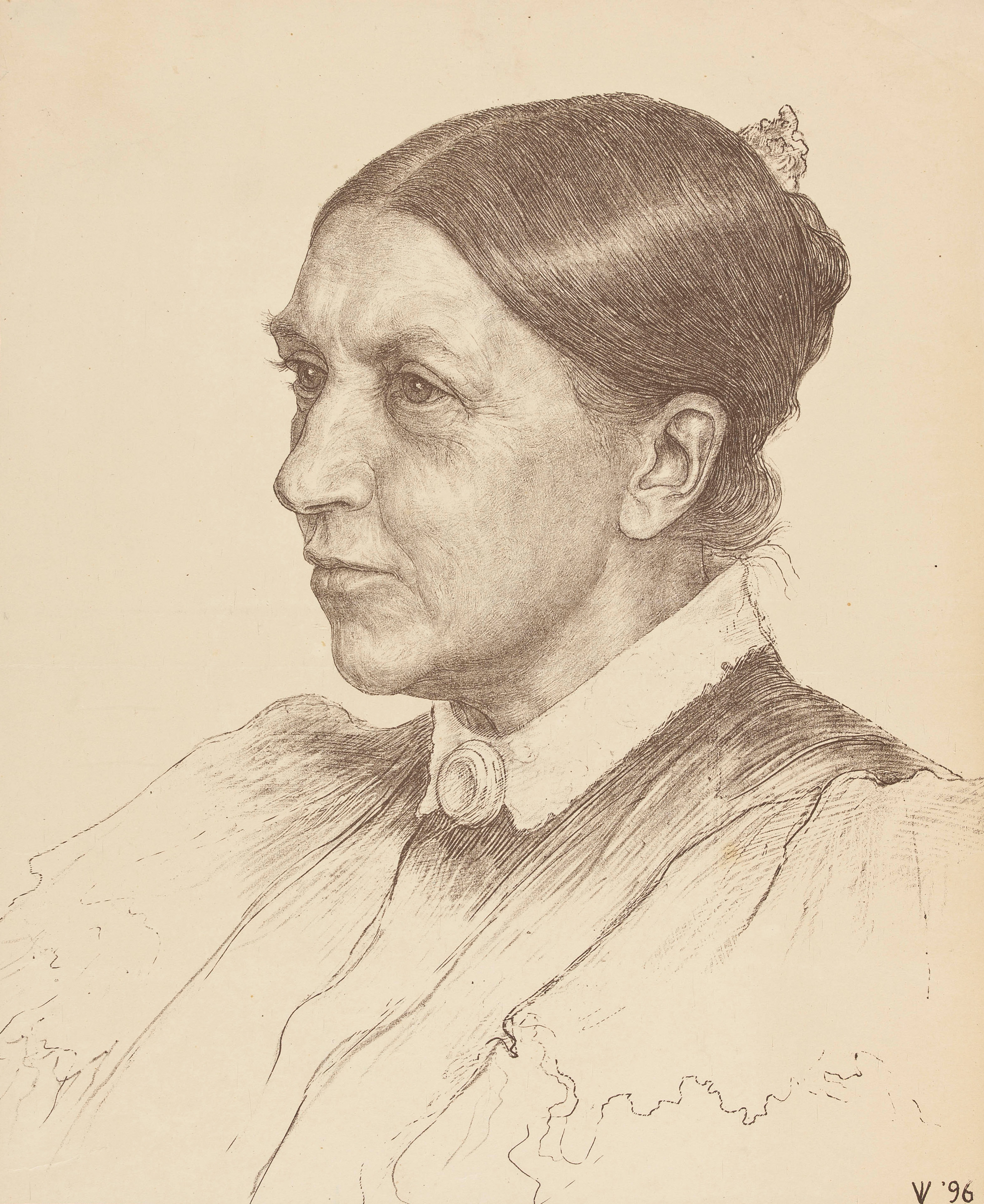
- Jeltje de Bosch Kemper, by Jan Veth
- Born: 28 April 1836; Amsterdam, Netherlands
- Died: 16 February 1916 (aged 79); Amsterdam, Netherlands

Jkvr. Jeltje de Bosch Kemper (1836 – 1916) was a Dutch feminist.

== Life ==
Bosch Kemper was born in Amsterdam on 28 April 1836. She was a member of the Kemper noble family, daughter of Jeronimo de Bosch Kemper (1808-1876) and Maria Aletta Hulshoff (1810-1844) and educated in a girls' school. She became interested in women's issues by The Subjection of Women by John Stuart Mill.

In 1871, she became a member of Betsy Perk's Algemeene Nederlandsche Vrouwenvereeniging Arbeid Adelt, an association with the goal to improve women's right to be educated and work to support themselves; in 1872, she founded her own association with the same purpose, Algemeene Nederlandsche Vrouwenvereeniging Tesselschade, which she chaired 1886-1911. In 1878 she founded Vereeniging voor Ziekenverpleging, the first courses to educate professional nurses in the Netherlands. In 1894, she became chairperson of the Maatschappelijken en den Rechtstoestand der Vrouw in Nederland, and association to improve the legal rights of women, and in 1896-1906 she manage her own women's rights magazine, Belung und Recht; she was also a member of the women suffrage association. Her younger sister Christine de Bosch Kemper was a (less public) women's right activist as well.

She and Anna Reijnvaan founded the Journal for Nursing for the Sick. In 1891, they worked together again to arrange the first conference on nursing, named ‘The Gathering’; however, despite Kemper being the conference president, no women were allowed to deliver speeches at the event.

Bosch Kemper died in Amsterdam on 16 February 1916.
