= E. M. Valk-Heijnsdijk =

Dutch cookbook writer and restaurateur (1867–1945)

- Born: Elisabeth Martha Heijnsdijk; 24 June 1867; Axel, Netherlands
- Died: 7 March 1945 (aged 77); Voorburg, Netherlands
- Other name: Elisabeth van der Molen-Heijnsdijk
- Occupations: Cookbook writer; restaurateur
- Known for: Early promotion of vegetarianism in the Netherlands
- Notable work: De Vegetarische Keuken (1896)
- Spouses: Pieter van der Molen (m. 1887; died 1896) Michiel Valk (m. 1901)

Elisabeth Martha Valk-Heijnsdijk (née Heijnsdijk; also known as Elisabeth van der Molen-Heijnsdijk; 24 June 1867 – 7 March 1945) was a Dutch cookbook writer and restaurateur. She was associated with the early promotion of vegetarianism in the Netherlands. Valk-Heijnsdijk managed Pomona in The Hague, one of the country's first vegetarian restaurants, and wrote vegetarian cookbooks including De Vegetarische Keuken (1896).

== Biography ==
=== Early and personal life ===
Valk-Heijnsdijk was born Elisabeth Martha Heijnsdijk on 24 June 1867 in Axel, Netherlands, to Jan Heijnsdijk and Janna Heijnsdijk (née Baak). She married Pieter van der Molen (1861–1896) in Axel on 25 August 1887, and used the surname Van der Molen-Heijnsdijk.

=== Vegetarianism ===
Valk-Heijnsdijk adopted a vegetarian diet mainly for health reasons. After she and her husband became ill, including with tuberculosis, they moved to Scheveningen. Following her husband's death, she gradually became vegetarian, later crediting the diet with improving her health.

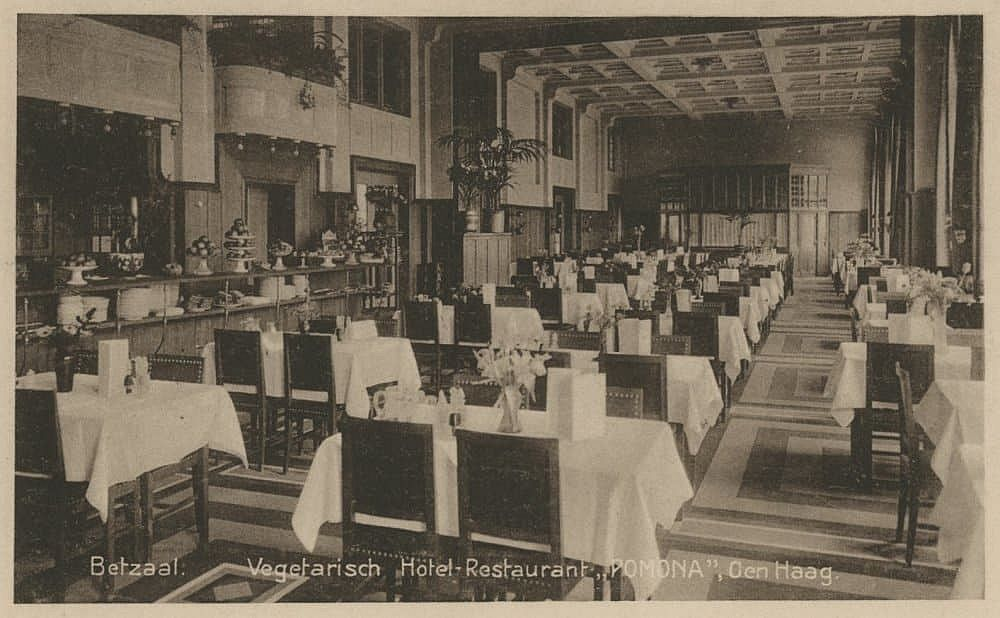
Interior of Pomona, The Hague (c. 1910)

The Dutch Vegetarian Association was founded in 1894. Marie Jungius, a member of the association, proposed a vegetarian restaurant run by women.

Valk-Heijnsdijk, who had worked at the Pomona vegetarian restaurant in Leipzig, was chosen to manage the project. After marrying Michiel Valk in 1901, she used the surname Valk-Heijnsdijk. The couple opened a vegetarian restaurant in The Hague, also named Pomona. The first Pomona restaurant opened in 1899. A later location opened in 1912 and was converted into the Parkhotel Den Haag in 1949.

Valk-Heijnsdijk wrote several cookbooks for the Dutch Vegetarian Association. They included De Vegetarische Keuken (first published in 1896), Stuivers kookboek (1898), and Drie-stuivers kookboek (1919). Charlotte Kleyn describes these as the first vegetarian cookbooks published in the Netherlands. De Vegetarische Keuken remains in print.

=== Death and legacy ===
Valk-Heijnsdijk died on 7 March 1945 in Voorburg.

In July 2024, a bridge in The Hague was named the Valk-Heijnsdijk Bridge. The naming followed a proposal by residents and the Party for the Animals. The bridge is in a neighbourhood where streets are named after female writers and feminists. The municipality said the naming was part of its work to increase the representation of women in public spaces.

== Publications ==
- De Vegetarische Keuken (1896)
- Stuivers kookboek (1898)
- Drie-stuivers kookboek (1919)
