= Frederike van Uildriks =

Dutch educator and botanist (1854–1919)

Frederica Johanna "Frederike" van Uildriks (31 May 1854, in Groningen – 12 July 1919, in Gorssel) was a Dutch educator and botanist, best known for her book Plantenschat (1898) written with Vitus Bruinsma describing 160 plants native to the Netherlands.
