= Tesselschade-Arbeid Adelt =

Dutch women's rights organization

The Tesselschade-Arbeid Adelt (TAA) is a Dutch women's rights organization. Founded in 1871 under the name Algemeene Vrouwenvereeniging Arbeid Adelt, it was the first nationwide women's organisation in the Netherlands, and the eldest still operating. It split into the Arbeid Adelt (AA) and Tesselschade in 1872, but reunified into the Tesselschade-Arbeid Adelt in 1947.

== History ==
=== Origin ===
In 1870 women had started to craft and sell products for the Red Cross. Betsy Perk saw this as an opportunity to encourage more women to sell their work.

=== Arbeid Adelt ===
Betsy Perk founded Algemeene Vrouwenvereeniging Arbeid Adelt, commonly known as Arbeid Adelt (AA; English: Labour Is Ennobling), in 1871. It was inspired by the debate over women's access to education and different professions, which had been initiated in the Netherlands by Mienette Storm-van der Chijs in the 1860s. The purpose of the organisation was to work for more access to education and professions for women, and to actively support women to support themselves professionally.

In October 1871 she founded the Algemeen Nederlandsche Vrouwenvereeniging Arbeid Adelt (General Dutch Women's Association Arbeid Adelt) along with its own magazine, Onze Roeping (Our Calling). The association mostly focused their efforts on unmarried women from the higher classes. In December 1871, an exhibition was organised in Delft where women's crafts could be bought. The names of the makers were presented along the items, which was a new phenomenon and was meant to highlight the fact that these women were also craftspeople willing to make profit. The exhibition became successful and was even visited by the Dutch Queen Sophie of Württemberg, who became a patron of the association.

=== Tesselschade ===
In April 1872, the organisation split, and Anna Wolterbeek, Jeltje de Bosch Kemper and Louise Wijnaendt formed their own group, named Tesselschade after Maria Tesselschade Visscher.

In April 1872 a fight between board members caused a split within the association. Part of the members decided to found the Vereniging Tesselschade, named after Maria Tesselschade Roemers Visscher. This organisation wished to focus more on the support of less-well-off women, who were allowed to sell their works anonymously. This was contrary to what Betsy Perk stood for, as she wanted wealthier women to make a name for themselves by selling products under their own names.

The Tesselschade organized the famous Nationale Tentoonstelling van Vrouwenarbeid 1898.

=== Tesselschade-Arbeid Adelt ===
Both associations decided to join forces again in 1947, after a successful exhibition on needlework. Due to discussions about organisational issues the groups did not actually fuse until 1953. From then on, the association became known as Tesselschade-Arbeid Adelt (TAA), and still exists today. TAA, among other activities, has several shops throughout the Netherlands where women can sell their articles. The association also has two funds, one for female students (the Betsy Perk-Opleidingsfonds) and one for (retired) craftswomen who cannot support themselves anymore (the Zegers Veeckenfonds).
