= Christine de Bosch Kemper =

Dutch writer (1840–1924)

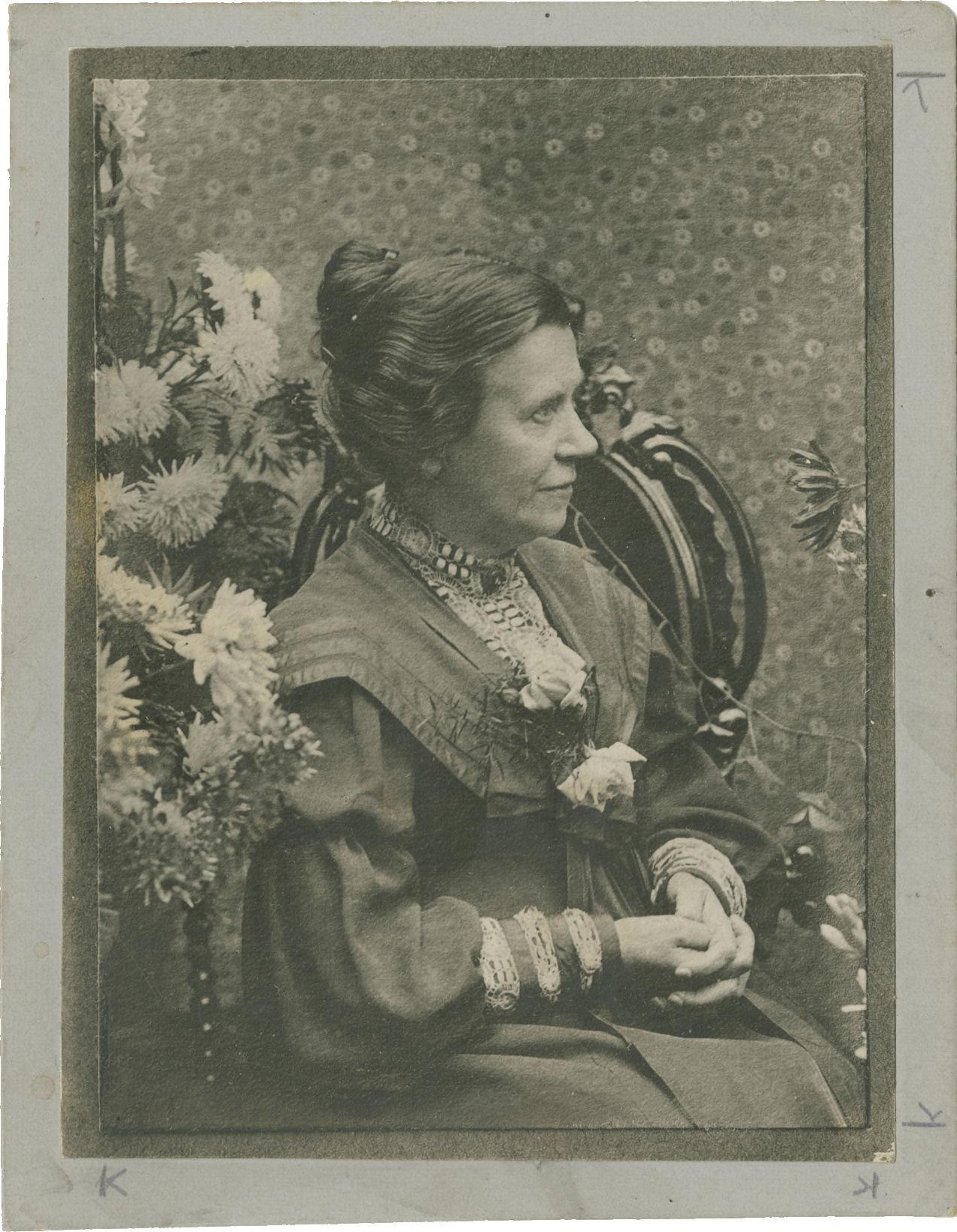
Christine de Bosch Kemper around 1895

Jonkvrouw/Freule Christine de Bosch Kemper (16 August 1840, Amsterdam - 12 May 1924, Amersfoort) was a Dutch writer.

She was a member of the Kemper noble family, daughter of Jeronimo de Bosch Kemper and Maria Aletta Hulshoff (not the author Maria Hulshoff) and younger sister of the suffragist Jeltje de Bosch Kemper. Jacob Gijsbert de Hoop Scheffer, then Mennonite pastor at Amsterdam, baptised her in 1861.

She began to concentrate on the education of young women in 1867, and to further that purpose moved in 1880 from Amsterdam to Amersfoort, where she opened her house as a school to educate all classes of young women for free. She also set up her own support fund from her mother's inheritance.

She and her sister Jeltje both championed women's rights, though Freule kept these ideas within her own circle. She bequeathed her stately home to become an old people's home and her other property to be administered by Mennonite directors for the improvement of women's material condition, as the "Christine-Stichting Foundation".

A memorial bench in Amersfoort was constructed in 1925 in memory of her social activities.
