= Onze Roeping =

Dutch women's magazine

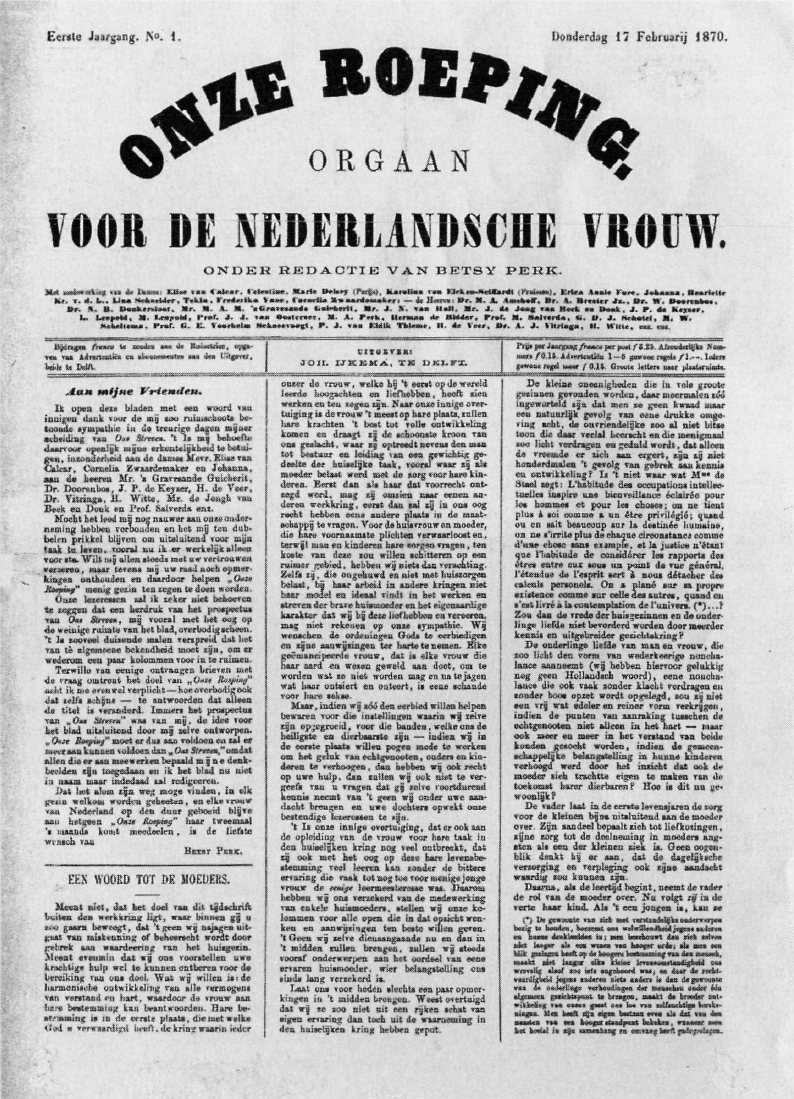
- The front page of the first issue, 17 February 1870
- Owner: Algemeene Nederlandsche Vrouwenvereeniging Arbeid Adelt
- Publisher: Joh. Ykema en van Gijn
- Editor: Betsy Perk
- Founded: February 1870
- Ceased publication: 1873
- Political alignment: Women’s rights
- Language: Dutch
- City: Delft
- Country: Netherlands

Onze Roeping. Orgaan voor de Nederlandsche vrouw (Our Calling. Organ for the Dutch woman) was a women's magazine published in the Netherlands between 1870 and 1873.

== History ==
The magazine was founded by Betsy Perk a pioneer of the Dutch women's movement. To spread her ideas, Perk had set up in 1869 a periodical named Ons Streven (Our Endeavour), one of the first magazines in the Netherlands to promote women's equality, which would be published until 1878. However, when the publisher put two male co-editors to work with her, she withdrew from the editorial team, because she suspected her colleagues of wanting to take the upper hand and feared that pieces against women's rights would also be included. Instead, she founded a new magazine the following year, Onze Roeping. The focus of this journal was that women should be able to work, with Park arguing that this would both be beneficial for women and for the general economy. She had originally intended to call it Ons Doel (Our Target) but the name was changed before the first issue.

The first issue of Onze Roeping was published on 17 February 1870, and was distributed throughout the Netherlands. The publisher was Joh. Ykema en van Gijn in Delft, who was also publishing Charles Darwin in Dutch at about the same time. The magazine was entirely devoted to women's emancipation and had organizing, activating and emancipatory objectives, to which the title referred. Perk was a founding member of the Algemeene Nederlandsche Vrouwenvereeniging Arbeid Adelt (General Dutch Women's Association 'Labour Ennobles') in 1871, which had aims rather similar to those of Park when setting up Onze Roeping, and started to sell handicrafts produced by women. In the same year, Ons Roeping became an organ of the association.

Onze Roeping appeared twice a month for most of its life. The magazine alternated between general essays, news on women's emancipation, sections on science topics, fictional prose, reviews, correspondence, and news from the association. It also contained advertisements. At the beginning of 1873 it turned into a monthly magazine and was published in a small book format instead of a newspaper format. The subtitle "Organ for the Dutch woman" changed to "Organ for Everyone. Dutch Women's association 'Arbeid Adelt'". The magazine then became more devoted to the work of the association. However, in the same year it was discontinued, both for financial reasons and because of policy disputes. In April 1872 the association had split into two, with one group of members forming a new association called the Tesselschade-Arbeid Adelt. The founders of this new association wished to focus more on giving support to poorer women, who were allowed to sell their works anonymously. This was contrary to what Betsy Perk stood for, as she wanted wealthier women, from her class, to make a name for themselves by selling products under their own names. Most of the Tesselschade group cancelled their subscription to Onze Roeping.
