= Jacques Perk =

Dutch poet (1859–1881)

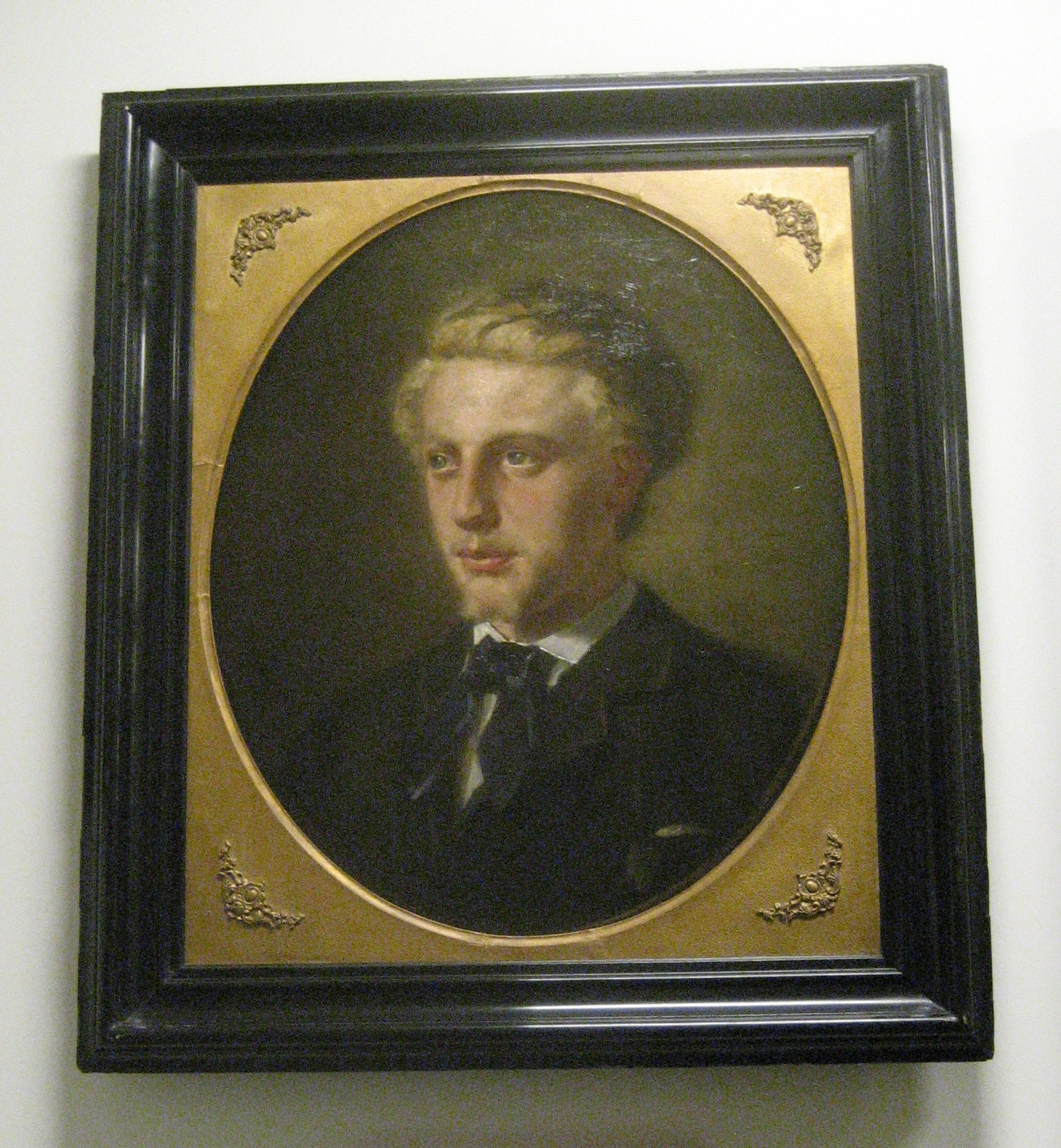
Jacques Perk (by Herman van de Voort in de Betouw, 1879)

Jacques Fabrice Herman Perk (10 June 1859 – 1 November 1881) was an important Dutch poet of the late 19th century. His crown of sonnets Mathilde, published by Willem Kloos, was the first important announcement of a renewal in Dutch poetry brought about by artists that came to be known as the Tachtigers. Perk's lyrical poems about nature, especially his sonnets, were influenced by Percy Bysshe Shelley, and were of great importance to Dutch poetry.

== Biography ==
=== Youth and education ===
Jacques Perk was born into a prominent family; he was the son of Marie Adrien Perk, a minister in the Walloon church (part of the Dutch Reformed Church), and a nephew of Betsy Perk, an important suffragette. Perk's father preached in French, and was a progressive with great literary interests and acquaintances. Perk grew up in an environment that resembled European aristocracy more than Dutch bourgeoisie.

This literary environment was conducive to young Jacques, who began writing poetry around age 10. In 1872 the family moved from Breda to Amsterdam, where Perk attended the Hogere Burgerschool. Influenced by his Dutch teacher Willem Doorenbos, he developed a strong interest in the Renaissance ideal of well-rounded education. Disappointed with the intellectual climate of the HBS, he left it in 1877, and by next year his father had found him a position with the Algemeen Handelsblad, an important liberal newspaper, where he translated and edited from French. He also wrote many short poems, most of them dedicated to the love of his youth, Marie Champury, the daughter of his French teacher at the HBS. Her father had no faith in any relationship his daughter might form with a drop-out who was all too interested in literature, and Marie herself, while honored, was not swayed by the young poet's romanticism, which he expressed in poetry and in a five-act play called Herman en Martha.

After a definitive rejection by Marie, Perk unsuccessfully attempted to sign on with a polar expedition on the Willem Barents. He began reading and carefully studying the sonnets of Petrarch, Shakespeare, Goethe and Alphonse de Lamartine. For the first time one of his poems was published, in a monthly magazine, Jan ten Brink's Nederland. He began falling away from the faith of his father, started dressing more extravagantly, and spent nights discussing life with his friends, including later writer and socialist Frank van der Goes. He had been fired by the Handelsblad already, having expressed himself in too literary a manner.

=== Mathilde, Kloos, and poetry ===
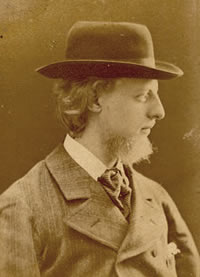
Jacques Perk

In 1879 he met a young French-speaking woman, Mathilde Thomas, while on family vacation in the Belgian Ardennes (he may have met Oscar Wilde there, though there is no conclusive evidence). In the pittoresque setting of rocks, castle ruins, brooks, and mountains, the two families spent five days in play and friendship. When they said their goodbyes, in La Roche-en-Ardenne, Mathilde gave Perk and his sisters a goodbye poem inspired by Alphonse de Lamartine, and Perk's admiration was turned into love, mixed with worship. This, in turn, gave him the inspiration to recreated Mathilde in verse, and the result was a crown of sonnets, consisting of over a hundred poems, which he intended to publish as Mathilde, een sonnettenkrans. He sent selections to literary magazines, including Carel Vosmaer's Spectator and Ten Brink's Nederland, but none were published; his modern lyricism with its strongly individual sentiment was not what the traditional literary critics were looking for.

In 1880 he started at law school in Amsterdam, but at that time got to know the young poet Willem Kloos, with whom he developed an intimate friendship. Four of his Mathilde sonnets were published in Vosmaer's literary magazine Spectator, and a few weeks later five more were published in Nederland. Perk considered law school a necessary evil, just a way to make a living, but was more interested in classes in philosophy and literature. His friendship with Kloos led him to write a sonnet cycle, Verzen aan een vriend ("Verses to a friend"), written with playful ease. Kloos, who had to work much harder on his poems but had the same problems Perk did in getting them published, was deeply impressed, even while he critiqued Perk's poetry and, with his permission, edited his work.

With Kloos he traveled to Brussels in 1880 and then to La Roche, where a year before he had spent five passionate days with Mathilde. Though his sister Dora maintained an active correspondence with her, Jacques felt no need to see the real Mathilde again, the more divine portrayal of her in his poetry having taken her place. When he returned Vosmaer asked him to write for Spectator, including literary criticism; he wrote the masterful poem De schim van P.C. Hooft for the 300th celebration of P.C. Hooft.

=== Final year, Joanna ===
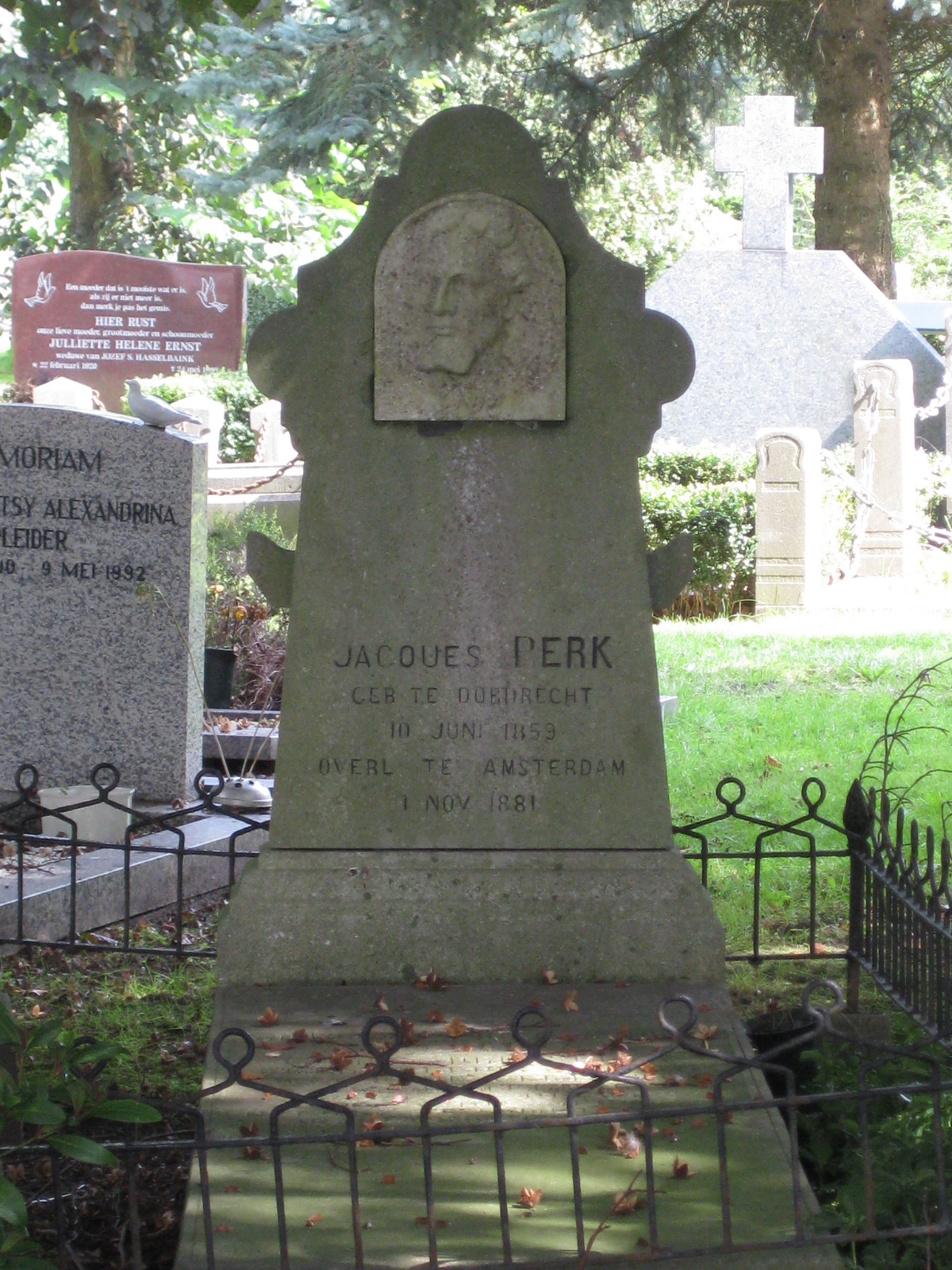
Perk's grave at De Nieuwe Ooster

In 1881, while preparing for his sister's wedding, Perk met the groom's sister, Joanna Blancke, and wrote her passionate letters. He made an attempt to recast his Mathilde cycle with her in the central position, but Joanna had become too important and he became consumed by love and lyricism. He ended his friendship with Kloos. Joanna, however, was engaged to another man, and while she broke off that engagement she proved, in her loneliness, to be inaccessible to him. He tried to bridge the gap between them by writing, hoping to win her that way, and toward the end of 1881 published, in Spectator, a cycle called Eene helle- en hemelvaart ("A journey through hell and heaven") which included a number of sonnets from the Mathilde cycle, reworked for Joanna. His poem "Iris", influenced by Shelley and published shortly before his death, is dedicated to Joanna, and its final lines speak of loneliness, desire, and death. Joanna's response to Perk's publication of his feelings for her is not known. At the end of September Perk fell ill after rowing on the Amstel, and developed a fever and persistent coughing. In the meantime his literary star was on the rise: Joseph Alberdingk Thijm and Vosmaer praised his work, the latter comparing him to Dante Alighieri.

But in mid-October it became clear that Perk only had a few weeks to live, due to an abscess on one of his lungs, which had bothered him before. He said goodbye to his family on Sunday, 30 October, telling them he was headed toward eternity fully consciously. He died on 1 November, around five in the afternoon. He was buried on 5 November on the Oude Oosterbegraafplaats in Amsterdam, en was reburied in 1900 on the Nieuwe Oosterbegraafplaats (vak 1 nr. 19). His grave is a Rijksmonument.

== Posthumous publications ==
Perk's Gedichten were published after his death by Vosmaer and Kloos (who altered the sequence of the poems significantly and made many editorial changes). The introduction, written by Kloos, became a founding manifesto of the Tachtigers.

== Primary bibliography ==
- 1881 De schim van P.C. Hooft. In: De Nederlandsche Spectator, 26 maart 1881. Den Haag, Nijhoff.
- 1881 Eene Helle- en Hemelvaart. in: De Nederlandsche Spectator, 3 september 1881. Den Haag, Nijhoff.
- 1881 Iris. In: De Tijdspiegel van Oktober 1881. Amsterdam, Veen.
- 1882 Gedichten. Met een Voorrede van mr. Carel Vosmaer, en een inleiding van Willem Kloos. Sneek, Pijttersen.
- 1894 Nagelaten verzen van Jacques Perk, uitgegeven door Willem Kloos. in: De Nieuwe Gids, jaargang 9. Amsterdam, Versluys.
- 1941 Jacques Perks Mathilde-krans, naar de handschriften volledig uitgegeven door G. Stuiveling, drie delen (wetenschappelijke uitgave). Den Haag, Boucher.
- 1957 Verzamelde gedichten, naar de handschriften uitgegeven door Garmt Stuiveling. Amsterdam, Arbeiderspers.

== Biography ==
- Perk, Betsy (1902). Jacques Perk, geschetst voor 't Jong Nederland der XXe Eeuw, met onuitgegeven Prozastukken, Gedichten en Portretten van den Dichter. Amsterdam, S.L. van Looy.
- Stuiveling, G. (1939). Een dichter verliefd. Brieven van Jacques Perk aan Joanna Blancke, uitgegeven en ingeleid door G. Stuiveling, Den Haag, Leopold.
- Stuiveling, G. (1957). Het korte leven van Jacques Perk. Amsterdam, Querido.
- Hoorweg, C. (2014). Van Mathilde tot Mei. De dichters van 1880 en de vriendschapssonnetten van Jacques Perk en Willem Kloos Baarn, Prominent. ISBN 978-90-79272-38-9
