= Vitus Bruinsma =

Frisian natural scientist (1850–1916)

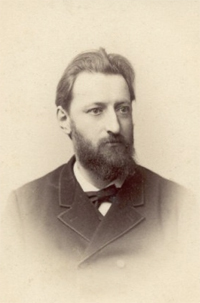
Image of Vitus Jacobus Bruinsma

Vitus Jacobus Bruinsma (10 November 1850, in Leeuwarden – 28 August 1916, in Rotterdam) was a Dutch natural scientist and politician from Frisia, best remembered for founding the Vereniging tegen de Kwakzalverij in 1881 with his brother.
