= Felix Ortt =

Dutch writer and reformer (1866–1959)

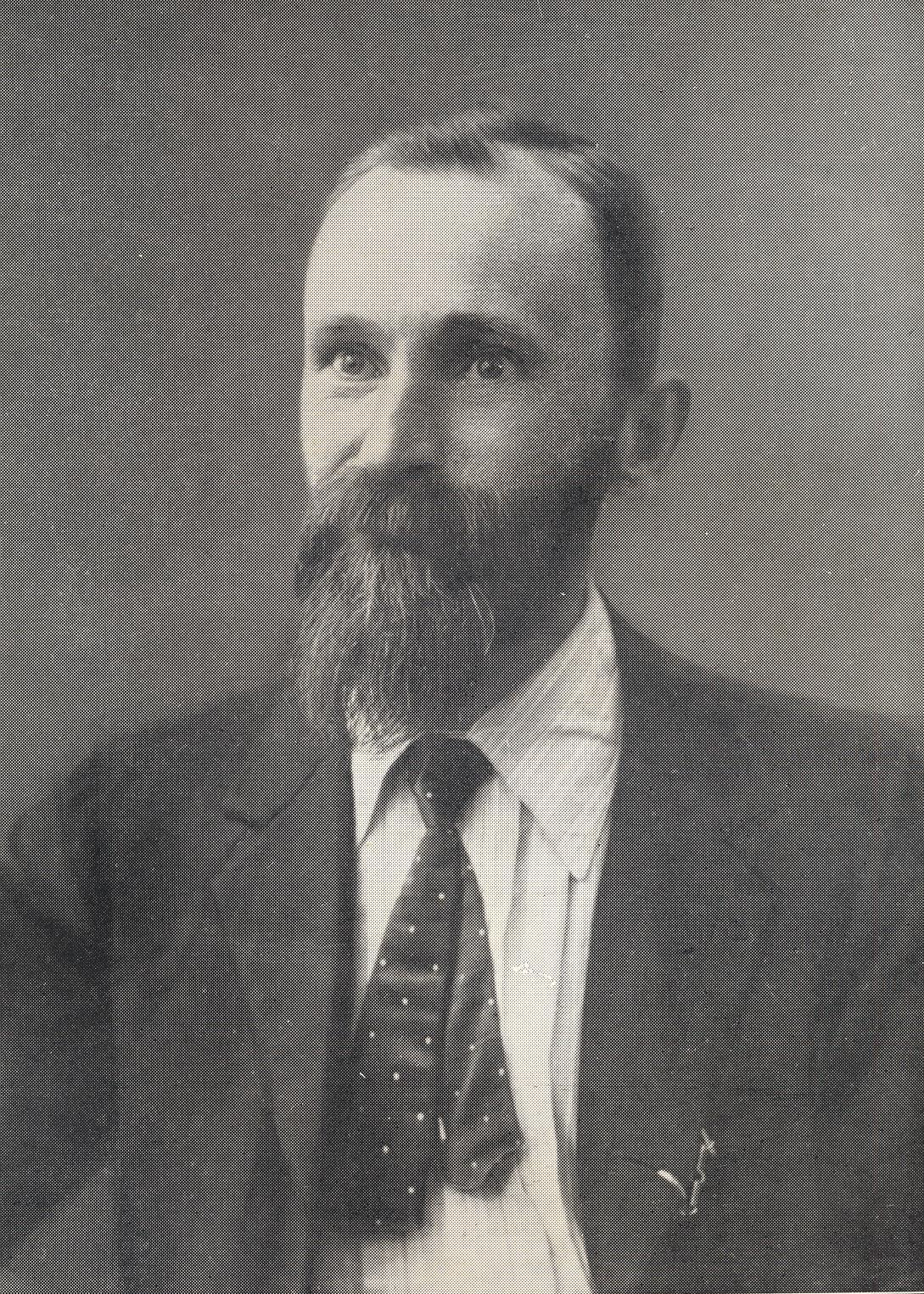
- Ortt in 1906
- Born: Felix Louis Ortt; 9 June 1866; Groningen, Netherlands
- Died: 15 October 1959 (aged 93); Soest, Netherlands
- Occupations: Civil engineer; activist; writer; translator
- Known for: Advocacy for animal welfare, vegetarianism, Christian anarchism, and social reform
- Spouses: Anna Petronella Gelderman (m. 1892; div. 1905) Tine Hinlopen (m. 1905) (free marriage) Maria Theresia Zeijlemaker (m. 1932)
- Children: 6

Felix Louis Ortt (9 June 1866 – 15 October 1959) was a Dutch civil engineer, writer, translator, and social reformer. He was active in the Dutch animal welfare and vegetarianism movements, co-founded the Dutch Vegetarian Association in 1894, and became a leading figure in the development of Christian anarchism in the Netherlands. Born in Groningen, Ortt left government service to pursue a life based on nonviolence, simple living, and ethical living. He co-founded a Christian anarchist commune, edited the journal Vrede, and translated works by J. Howard Moore into Dutch. His writings addressed subjects including wealth inequality, education, spirituality, sexual ethics, vegetarianism, and parapsychology.

== Biography ==
=== Early life and education ===
Ortt was born in Groningen on 9 June 1866 into a strict Protestant family. Following family tradition, he studied civil engineering at Delft University of Technology and worked for the Dutch water management authority, Rijkswaterstaat. A bout of malaria in 1890 led him to explore natural medicine, and he adopted vegetarianism. In 1894, he co-founded the Dutch Vegetarian Association.

=== Christian anarchism and social reform ===
Ortt became more involved in social activism after encountering the works of Leo Tolstoy at a temperance congress in 1896. Influenced by Tolstoy's ideas on nonviolence and Christianity, he became disillusioned with government service and resigned from Rijkswaterstaat in 1899. He later left the Dutch Reformed Church and became involved in Christian anarchism. He edited Vrede ("Peace"), a journal that promoted nonviolence, simplicity, and ethical living.

=== Commune and writing ===
In 1900, Ortt co-founded a Christian anarchist commune near Blaricum, which attempted to create a community based on the teachings of Jesus, with an emphasis on nonviolence, vegetarianism, and simplicity. The commune included a horticultural group, a printing press, and a bakery, but internal disputes over religious interpretation contributed to its dissolution in 1903. Ortt later described the experience in his novel series Felicia and continued to write and edit works on humanitarianism, ethics, and social reform.

Ortt was also active in the Rein Leven-Beweging ("Pure Life Movement"), which promoted spiritual purity, sexual ethics, and moral conduct. His writings on love, marriage, and sexuality drew criticism, especially because of his support for free marriage.

=== Translation work ===
Ortt translated several works by the American zoologist J. Howard Moore into Dutch.

=== Personal life ===
Ortt married three times. In 1892, he married Anna Petronella Gelderman, with whom he had three children before their marriage ended in divorce in 1905. Later that year, he entered into a free union with Tine Hinlopen, with whom he had three children. In 1932, he married Maria Theresia Zeijlemaker, the head of a children's home.

=== Later years and death ===
During World War I, Ortt was a conscientious objector. During World War II, he aided refugees in Soest. Ortt continued to publish works on vegetarianism, spirituality, and parapsychology in later life. He died in Soest on 15 October 1959.

== Legacy ==
A retirement home for vegetarians in Oosterbeek was named after Ortt.

== Publications ==
Ortt was a prolific writer and published many works:

- Christelijk anarchisme ("Christian Anarchism"; Haarlem, 1898)
- Het beginsel der liefde ("The Principle of Love"; The Hague, 1898)
- Naar het groote licht ("Towards the Great Light"; The Hague, 1899)
- Open brief aan de presidente van den Nederlandschen Vrouwenbond ter Internationale Ontwapening ("Open Letter to the President of the Dutch Women's Union for International Disarmament"; Amsterdam, 1899)
- Het spiritisme ("Spiritism"; The Hague, 1899)
- Denkbeelden van een christen-anarchist ("Thoughts of a Christian Anarchist"; The Hague, 1900)
- Medische wetenschap en vivisectie ("Medical Science and Vivisection"; The Hague, 1902)
- Brieven over gezondheid (in het bijzonder tot arbeiders) ("Letters about Health, especially to workers"; Blaricum, 1902)
- Praktisch socialisme ("Practical Socialism"; Amersfoort, 1903)
- Het streven der christen-anarchisten ("The Aspiration of the Christian Anarchists"; Amersfoort, 1903)
- Rein leven en Geheelonthouding ("Pure Life and Total Abstinence"; Soest, 1903)
- Manifest van het Landelijk Comite Zaak-Terwey. Waar het om gaat en wat onze plicht is ("Manifesto of the National Committee on the Terwey Case. What It Is About and What Our Duty Is"; n.p., 1903)
- Aan mijn zusje – brief over het geslachtsleven ("To My Little Sister – A Letter about Sexual Life"; Amersfoort, 1903)
- Het Nieuw-Malthusianisme. Uit ethisch oogpunt beschouwd ("Neo-Malthusianism. Considered from an Ethical Point of View"; Amersfoort, 1904)
- Sexueele ethiek ("Sexual Ethics"; Amersfoort, 1904)
- De Vrije Mensch: studies ("The Free Human: Studies"; Amersfoort, 1904)
- Een zedelijke plicht der ouders ("A Moral Duty of Parents"; The Hague, 1905)
- Apen en menschen ("Apes and Humans"; The Hague, 1907)
- De reinleven-beweging. Ontstaan, doel, beginselen en organisatie der rein levenbeweging. Kort uiteengezet ("The Pure Life Movement. Origin, Purpose, Principles, and Organization of the Pure Life Movement. Briefly Explained"; n.p., 1908)
- Brieven over Godsgeloof. Verkorte volksuitgave der 'Brieven aan een vriendinnetje over religieuze begrippen' ("Letters about Faith in God. Abridged Popular Edition of 'Letters to a Little Friend about Religious Concepts'"; Blaricum, 1909)
- Drankzucht en hoe die tegen te gaan ("Alcoholism and How to Combat It"; n.p., 1911)
- Het dure vleesch ("The Expensive Meat"; n.p., 1913)
- De invloed van den oorlog op de ethiek ("The Influence of the War on Ethics"; Purmerend, 1916)
- Inleiding tot het pneumatisch-energetisch monisme. Een beschouwing over God, de wereld, het leven, mensch en maatschappij, vanuit het standpunt der natuurwetenschap ("Introduction to Pneumatic-Energetic Monism. A Consideration of God, the World, Life, Humanity, and Society from the Perspective of Natural Science"; The Hague, 1917)
- Tweede brief aan mijn zusje. Over verloving en huwelijk ("Second Letter to My Little Sister. About Engagement and Marriage"; Soest, 1921)
- Over kunst en schoonheid ("About Art and Beauty"; Blaricum, 1921)
- De koepokinenting ("The Smallpox Vaccination"; Hilversum, 1927)
- Nieuwe beschouwingen over den droom en de droompsyche ("New Considerations about the Dream and the Dream Psyche"; Amsterdam, 1927)
- Het wezen der homeopatische geneeswijze ("The Nature of Homeopathic Medicine"; Hilversum, 1930)
- Over de dierenziel ("About the Animal Soul"; The Hague, 1933)
- Verleden, heden en toekomst der natuurgeneeswijze ("Past, Present, and Future of Naturopathy"; Soest, 1939)
- Levenshouding ("Attitude to Life"; n.p., 1942)
- De superkosmos. Filosofie van het occultisme en het spiritisme ("The Super Cosmos. Philosophy of Occultism and Spiritism"; The Hague, 1949)
- Het droomleven ("The Dream Life"; The Hague, 1951)
- Over Frederik van Eeden ("About Frederik van Eeden"; Amsterdam, 1958)

== See also ==
- Anarchism in the Netherlands
- Vegetarianism in the Netherlands
