= Nationale Tentoonstelling van Vrouwenarbeid 1898 =

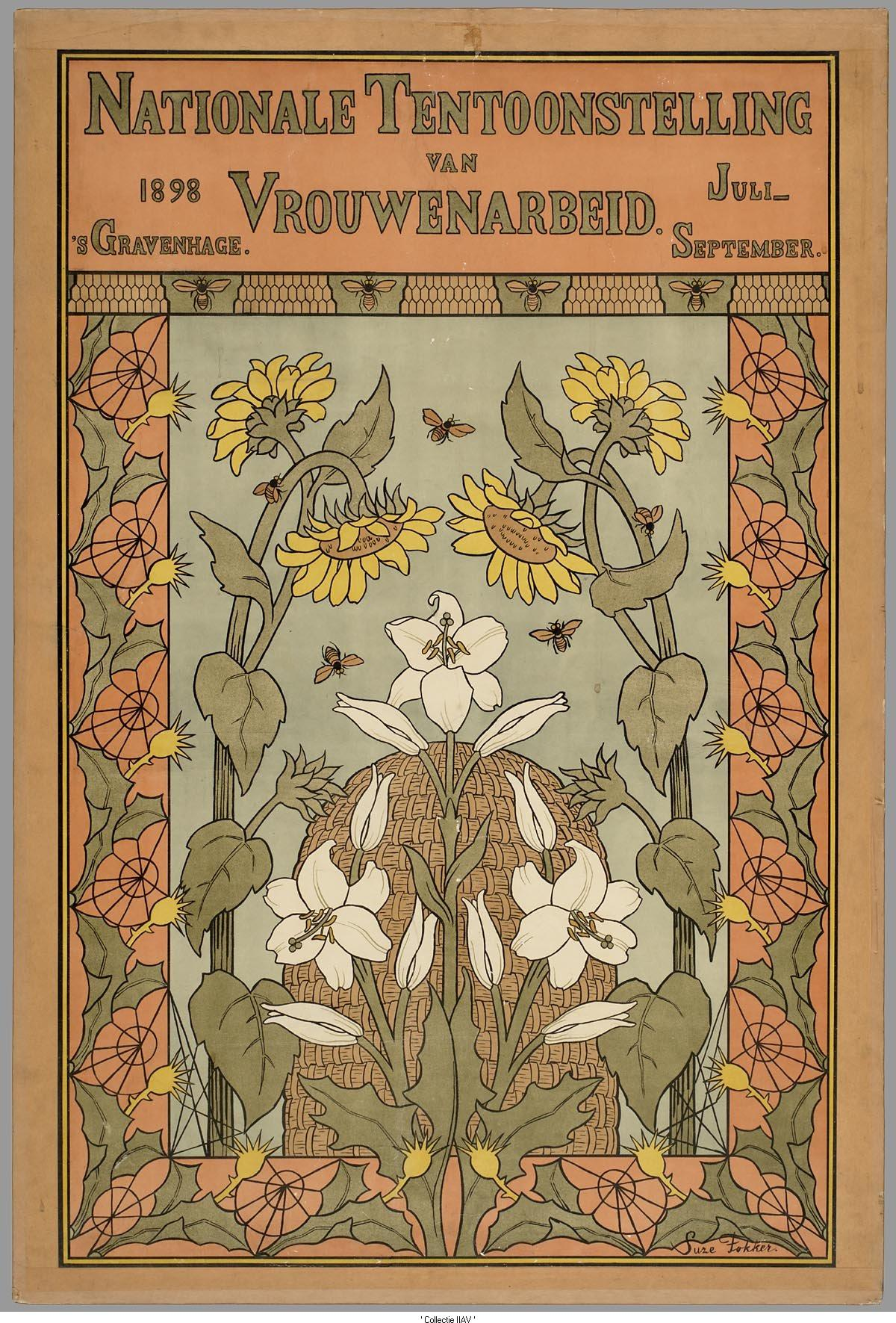
Vrouwenarbeid

Nationale Tentoonstelling van Vrouwenarbeid 1898 (literary: 'National Exhibition of Women's Work') was a national exhibition which took place in The Hague in The Netherlands 9 July – 21 September 1898.

The exhibition was organized on the initiative of the women's organisation Tesselschade. It featured artwork and handicrafts by female artists, products by businesswomen, as well as speeches, lectures, performances, and other activities. The purpose was to draw attention to women's work and the terms under which they worked and to encourage women to be active professionally. The exhibition is considered to be a major event within the Dutch women's movement within the first-wave feminism in the Netherlands.
