= Dutch Vegetarian Society =

- De Nederlandse Vegetariërsbond
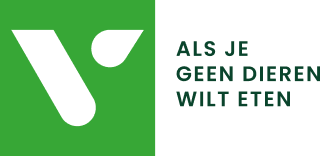
- Abbreviation: NVB
- Founded: 30 September 1894; 132 years ago
- Founders: Aart Verschoor, others
- Type: Public benefit organization
- Registration no.: 40407105
- Purpose: Promotion of vegetarianism and veganism
- Headquarters: Celebesstraat 80, Amsterdam
- Region served: Netherlands
- Services: V-Label certification
- Methods: Events, consumer education, publications, partnerships with manufacturers, certification
- Members: c. 4000 (2024)
- Director: Floris de Graad
- Website: vegetariers.nl

The Dutch Vegetarian Society (Note: Also translated as the Dutch Vegetarian Association.) (Dutch: De Nederlandse Vegetariërsbond, shortened to Vegetariërsbond and abbreviated as NVB) is a public benefit organization in the Netherlands that promotes vegetarianism and veganism. It was founded on 30 September 1894 after a proposal by the Rotterdam doctor Aart Verschoor. The Society has published vegetarian literature, taken part in the international vegetarian movement and administered the V-Label certification in the Netherlands. In the 21st century, its activities have included consumer information, work with food manufacturers and campaigns to reduce meat consumption.

== History ==
The Rotterdam doctor Aart Verschoor adopted vegetarianism after meeting the British doctor Thomas Allinson. Allinson argued that white bread contributed to illness among workers, recommended wholemeal bread and supported vegetarianism. According to Leidsch Dagblad, Verschoor's health improved after he changed his diet, and he remained a vegetarian afterwards.

Verschoor distributed a pamphlet, Een Bond voor Vegetariërs! ("A Society for Vegetarians!"), which proposed a national vegetarian organization. Thirty-four individuals and thirteen associations expressed support. The inaugural meeting was held in The Hague on 30 September 1894, when the Nederlandsche Vegetariërsbond was founded. A committee of five men and three women took responsibility for the new society after difficulties in forming a leadership committee. By October 1895, it had 48 members and 42 associates. Verschoor was president and C. van der Hucht was vice-president.

The Society's early work included translating vegetarian literature into Dutch, including Anna Kingsford's The Perfect Way in Diet, which appeared with a foreword by Frederik van Eeden, and publishing a vegetarian cookbook. It also organised public lectures, placed articles in newspapers and encouraged food establishments to provide vegetarian meals. Plans for a vegetarian restaurant were discussed but delayed because of financial constraints. By 1897, the Society had 64 members and 48 associates. In the same year, it began publishing Vegetarische Bode ("Vegetarian Messenger"), edited by Daniël de Clercq, Felix Ortt and C. van der Hucht. The Society was initially affiliated with the Vegetarian Federal Union, withdrew in 1897 because of concerns over political material in its publications and rejoined in 1898 after receiving assurances that the Union would remain non-political. By 1899, membership had risen to 264.

The NVB was active in the international vegetarian movement from its early years. At the first congress of the International Vegetarian Union in 1908, A. Meyroos represented the Society and served on its first committee. Meyroos also supported educational work on vegetarianism in Dutch schools. In 1913, the Society hosted the IVU World Vegetarian Congress in The Hague. Hugo Nolthenius, who was president of the NVB and treasurer of the IVU during the 1920s, represented the Society in international meetings.

Membership increased until the First World War and later declined during the war and the economic hardship that followed. During the Second World War, membership rose again because food coupon systems allowed vegetarians to exchange meat coupons for scarce vegetable alternatives. Interest increased in the 1970s in connection with the reform movement, and again in the 1980s through opposition to factory farming. Since the early 21st century, climate change has been a common motive for vegetarianism among the Society's members and supporters.

The NVB administers the V-Label certification in the Netherlands and has set a target of reducing Dutch meat consumption by 50% by 2040, compared with 2007 levels. Its work includes consumer information, cooperation with manufacturers and work to increase the availability of vegetarian products in supermarkets. As of 2024, the organization had nearly 4,000 members, a level comparable with its membership before the First World War.
