= Nicolette Bruining =

Dutch theologian (1886–1963)

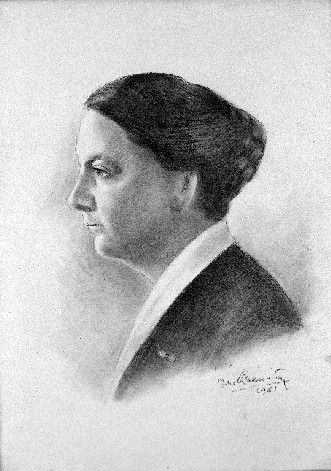
- Born: Nicolette Adriana Bruining; 27 August 1886; Stompetoren, Netherlands
- Died: 12 April 1963 (aged 76); The Hague, Netherlands
- Occupations: theologian, radio founder, educator and humanitarian
- Years active: 1912–1956
- Known for: founding VPRO rescuing Jews from the Holocaust

Nicolette Adriana Bruining (27 August 1886 – 12 April 1963) was a Dutch theologian and founding president of the Liberal Protestant Radio Broadcasting Corporation (Dutch: Vrijzinnig Protestantse Radio Omroep) (VPRO). She was also a teacher and humanitarian, assisting Jews during the Second World War. Her aid was acknowledged by the state of Israel, which posthumously awarded her as Righteous Among the Nations in 1990.

== Biography ==
Nicolette Adriana Bruining was born on 27 August 1886 in Stompetoren, Netherlands to Aida Helena Elisabeth (née Huygens) and Albertus Bruining. She graduated from Barlaeus Gymnasium in Amsterdam and decided to follow in her father's footsteps, pursuing her university studies in theology. She enrolled at the University of Amsterdam, where her father was a professor, graduating with a bachelor's degree in 1912. That same year, she began teaching religion at various schools, including the teacher training school of the Haagsch Genootschap (The Hague Society). In 1916, she presented her dissertation on the Dutch dogmatic Lutheran theologian Franz Hermann Reinhold von Frank (De Theologie van F.H.R. von Frank). She joined the Association of Liberal Protestants and served as chair of The Hague's chapter. She also began preaching in various municipalities for both the liberal branch of the Dutch Reformed Church and the Netherlands Protestant Association.

In 1923, she helped establish the Vrijzinnige Geloofsgemeenschap NPB to broaden the scope of the church. In particular, she proposed that the new medium of radio be used to disseminate the liberal Christian view. In 1925, Bruining and E. D. Spelberg set up a committee to investigate the possibility of broadcasting programming in support of their cause; they discovered that the government body responsible for broadcast licensing would only grant airtime to legally established organizations. As a result, the Central Committee went on in 1926 to establish the Vrijzinnig Protestantse Radio Omroep (Liberal Protestant Radio Broadcasting Corporation, VPRO); Bruining was president, and Spelberg secretary. Bruining publicized their approach both in their broadcasts and in the articles frequently published in the radio magazine Vrije Geluiden (Free Sounds), advocating non-sectarianism and inviting all intellectual movements to participate. During the Nazi occupation of the Netherlands during World War II, VPRO was banned from broadcasting.

Bruining had been teaching Hebrew to upper-level classes at the municipal high school in The Hague, but in 1941, all Jewish students were expelled and she quit teaching in protest. She agreed to continue teaching students in her home. When one of her students, Elisabeth Waisvisz and her family, were threatened with deportation, Bruining acted as an intermediary with the underground to help them find safehouses, provided ration coupons, acted as a go-between for delivering letters between the family members and personally delivered the message to Waisvisz that her parents had been betrayed and sent to Westerbork transit camp. Both Waisvisz daughters survived the war, thanks to Bruining's intervention.

In 1945, VPRO was allowed to go back on the air. Bruining and Spelberg were fully reinstated in 1947. In 1951, when the Dutch Television Foundation was established, Bruining served on its board as a representative of VPRO. Throughout the 1950s, she hosted a program known as Today; owing to her preferences, the program was broadcast live. She retired in 1956 and was made honorary president of VPRO for life. Bruining died on 12 April 1963 in The Hague. Posthumously, she was honored by the government of Israel on 7 March 1990 as one of the Righteous Among the Nations, an award granted to recognize non-Jews for assisting Jews in surviving the Holocaust, for her assistance to the Waisvisz family.

== Bibliography ==
- van Diggelen, Michiel (2011). "Nicolette Adriana Bruining (1886–1963): Een pionier in dienst van de vrijzinnigheid". In Voolstra, Anne; van Veen, Mirjam; Cossee, Frederike; et al. (eds.). Honderd jaar vrouwen op de kansel, 1911–2011. Hilversum, The Netherlands: Uitgeverij Verloren. pp. 93–100. ISBN 978-90-8704-257-8.
