= Marie Muller-Lulofs =

Dutch social reformer and social worker (1854 – 1954)

- Born: Maria Geertruida Lulofs; 1 September 1854; Amsterdam, Netherlands
- Died: 23 January 1954 (aged 99); Utrecht
- Occupation: Social worker
- Known for: Founder or co-founder of many social work and benevolent organizations in the Netherlands
- Spouse: Samuel Muller
- Children: Frits, Nico and Bertha

Marie Muller-Lulofs (1854–1954) was a pioneer social worker in the Netherlands and among the founders of numerous Dutch institutions for poor relief and social work, including the School for Social Work in Amsterdam.

== Early life ==
Maria Geertruida Lulofs, best known as Marie Muller-Lulofs, was born in Amsterdam on 1 September 1854. She was the daughter of Claas Lulofs, a grain and tobacco merchant, and Bregtje Posthuma, who lived on Keizersgracht in central Amsterdam. She was the fourth and youngest child of the couple; her father had six children from his previous marriage who were also part of the family. She attended secondary school for two years at a Pietist girls' boarding school in Zeist. Back in Amsterdam, she wanted to go to the girls' high school, but her father died in 1870 and she had to help her mother with the house. Nevertheless, she often took the opportunity to attend lectures on various subjects at literary and cultural societies. She married Samuel Muller, an archivist and historian, in 1877 in Amsterdam. He was the best friend of one of her brothers. The couple moved to Utrecht and had two sons and one daughter, born in quick succession.

== Social work ==
Lulofs became aware of discrepancies of wealth at a young age. When she was ten, she had seen a poor girl of her age looking longingly at the food laid out on the table at the summer residence of the Lulofs family in the Haarlemmerhout, a public park. After her third child was born, she was able to leave her own children in the care of servants and focus on volunteering to help the poor. At the time, women with husbands were not expected to work unless out of necessity and women who could afford maids had little to do. If upper-middle-class women wanted to develop personally, volunteering was one of the only ways and this normally involved becoming involved with charitable work. Initially, Lulofs joined the Dutch Protestant Association, but she did not feel at home there and came to abhor Christian charities, which she saw as only wanting to win souls. She also did not agree with the views of the Social Democrats as she felt they placed too much emphasis on class struggle, although she did support strikes by railway workers in 1903. She eventually joined a circle of social-liberals associated with the Social Weekblad, a weekly magazine, that included the feminist and publicist Helena Mercier, who she had met while working at an Amsterdam soup kitchen. She joined the group because it did not want to just alleviate poverty but also remove its causes.

When her eldest son had finished primary school in 1889, Muller-Lulofs began to act more publicly. She researched poor relief in several countries and adopted good examples from abroad in the work of the associations she would form. She wrote articles for the Social Weekblad and the Utrechtsch Provinciaal en Stedelijk Dagblad, a daily newspaper, about her views on poor relief, gave lectures and courses to visitors to the poor. She also studied the development of social work in the Netherlands. In 1890, Muller-Lulofs, together with her husband and other Utrecht dignitaries, founded the Vereniging tot Verbetering van Armenzorg (Association for the Improvement of Poor Care) in Utrecht. The aim was to put an end to the arbitrariness of private assistance to the poor by trying to organise some form of coordination. Muller-Lulofs became secretary and later chairwoman of the association's Committee on Home Visits, and in 1900 chairwoman of the entire association. As founder and headmistress of the Volkshuishoudschool (People's Housekeeping School) in 1895, she devoted herself to training girls from the working class, who had left primary school, to "become decent servants and housewives".

In 1899, Muller-Lulofs was the inspiration for the School voor Maatschappelijk Werk (Training Institute for Social Work, renamed School for Social Work in 1904), which she set up in Amsterdam together with Mercier, Arnold Kerdijk, who was editor of the Social Weekblad, Willem Treub and Louise Went. The school is now part of the Amsterdam University of Applied Sciences. She put together the first curriculum and was a member of the school board for many years. Muller-Lulofs wanted to turn it into a boarding school, to remove the girls from the comfort of their family surroundings, but that proposal was not adopted by the other founders. In addition, she wanted to provide scholarships for poorer students, but the other founders disagreed, which meant that the training was only accessible to people who could afford it. She also lost the argument when proposing that the students should make visits to the houses of the poor to see the conditions that they lived in.

Muller-Lulofs also took the initiative to set up a Committee on Assistance to the Sick to provide home nursing, as well as a children's library. In 1904, on her initiative, a children's home to provide after-school care for children of working mothers was established in Utrecht; in 1907 she set up the Maatschappij tot Improvement der Volkshuisvesting (Society for the Improvement of Public Housing) and in 1908 a Centraal Werkloozen Bureau (Central Unemployed Bureau). That same year, she was involved in the founding of the Nederlandse Vereniging voor Armenzorg en Weldadigheid (Dutch Association for Care for the Poor and Benevolence), of which she would be a board member for more than 25 years. In 1912 she set up a bank designed to combat usury, which was later converted into a Savings and Loan Fund. In the same year, she was also involved in the redrafting of the Dutch Poor Law. In 1921 she established a Commission for Assistance in Difficult Circumstances, which aimed to alleviate the distress among the so-called 'quiet poor' in the bourgeois class. It was only in 1940, at the age of 84, that she resigned from all of her activities.

== Publications ==
- (1931) Veertig jaren particuliere armenzorg 1890-1930 (Forty years of private poor relief 1890–1930)
- (1916) Van mensch tot mensch (From person to person) ed. Tjeenk Willink, Haarlem
- (1903) Sociale opleiding (Social education) ed. Van Kampen & Son, Amsterdam
- (1901) Armverzorging en drankbestrijding (Poor relief and temperance temper)

== Awards and honours ==
In 1933 Muller-Lulofs was appointed Officer in the Order of Orange-Nassau on the 25th anniversary of the Dutch Association for Care for the Poor and Benevolence. In 1938 she was made a Dame of Honour of the Order of the House of Orange. On 28 November 1940, on the occasion of the fiftieth anniversary of the Association for the Improvement of Poor Care in Utrecht, she was presented with the silver medal of the city.

== Death and legacy ==
In later years, Lulofs suffered from increasing deafness. She died on 23 January 1954 in Utrecht, at the age of 99. In 2013, the Muller-Lulofshuis (Muller-Lulofs House) was opened at the Amsterdam University of Applied Sciences.

Lulofs sought to professionalise social work, moving it away from the fragmented and dilettante approach that preceded her, when each institution had its own rules, funds and target audience. She emphasised the need for research into and understanding of the causes of poverty and ways of alleviating it, and had a deep interest in the individual. She once noted, about the conditions the poor lived in: "I involuntarily ask myself: what would have become of me if I had been born in his environment".
