= Leesmuseum voor Vrouwen =

Women's library in Amsterdam, Netherlands

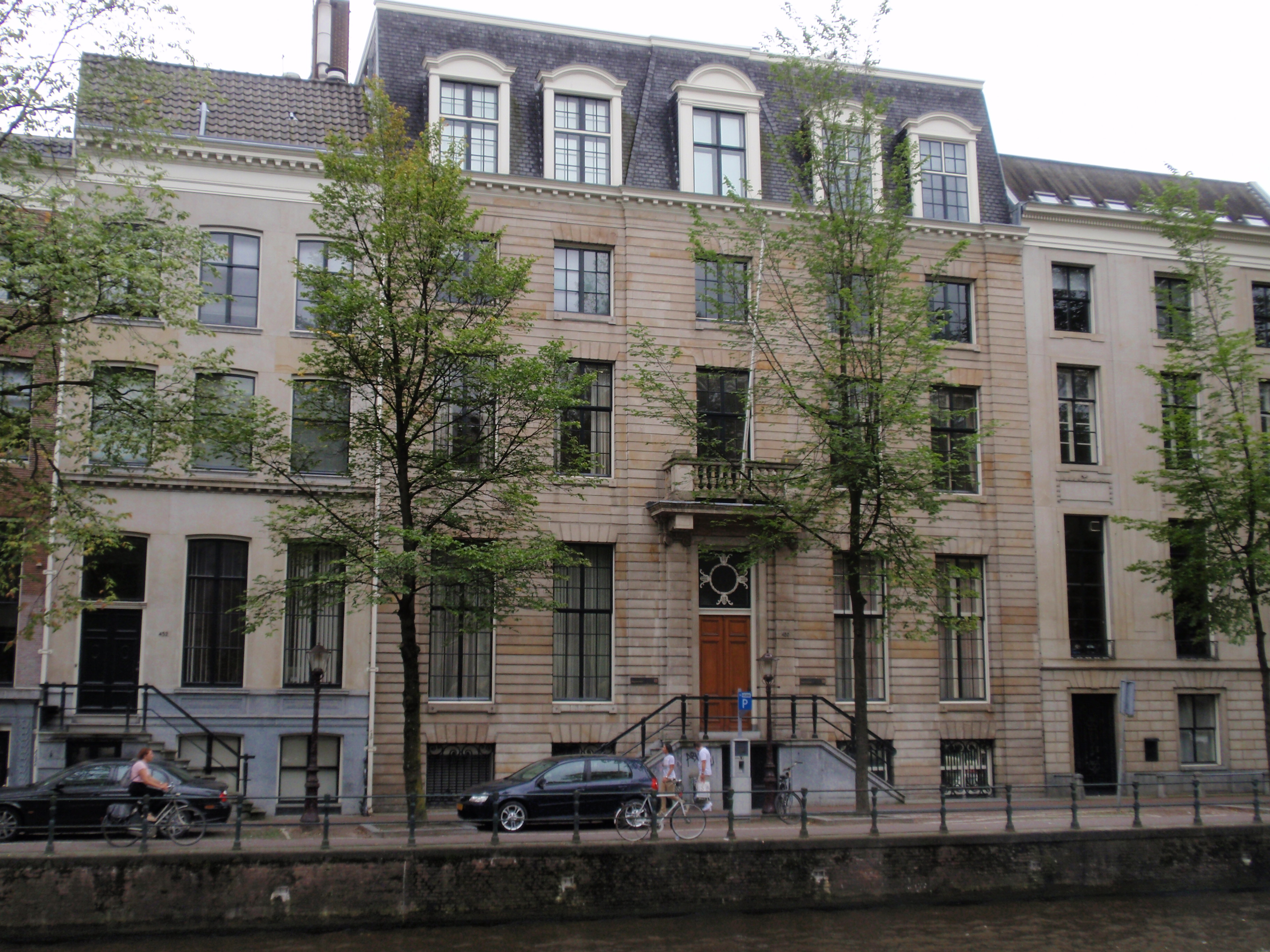
- Herengracht 450, one of the premises occupied by the library
- Location: Amsterdam, Netherlands
- Established: 1877
- Dissolved: 1966

Collection
- Items collected: Books, magazines
- Size: 30,000

The Leesmuseum voor Vrouwen (Reading museum for women) was an early library in Amsterdam, Netherlands where women could go to read. It subsequently also became a lending library. It was founded in 1877 and closed in 1966. The library joined the Dutch Women's Council, after the council was founded in 1898.

== Establishment ==
Several reading museums already existed prior to the founding of the Leesmuseum voor Vrouwen, such as the Amsterdam Reading Museum which dated back to 1800, but these were nearly all limited to men and none was available solely to women. Public libraries did exist in Amsterdam but were not considered suitable for ladies of the upper class. The Leesmuseum voor Vrouwen was set up by the feminist, Elise Haighton, the social worker and feminist, Hendrina Commelin, Wilhelmina Mercier-Meder, sister-in-law of Helena Mercier, the founder of social work in the Netherlands, and five others. Initially, 80 members joined in 1877 and paid an annual membership of 10 guilders, with the library also relying on donations. Fairly quickly, membership grew to about 150 members, and by 1897 there were 321. The number of members continued to grow and in 1913 there were 1080 women registered. By 1899, the library was in the position to hire a paid librarian, an important move as it was seen to give the library some prestige. Later, it would employ a second librarian. The Leesmuseum was first housed on Hartenstraat 20 in Amsterdam. In 1900, it moved to Herengracht 450 and in 1921 to P.C. Hooftstraat 148. After moving to Herengracht it had space for a meeting room. Speakers included the religious educator Emilie Knappert, the feminist translator, Margaretha Meijboom, the writer, Augusta de Wit, and the actress Marie Kalff.

Membership was not open to all, and was largely restricted to the upper middle class. Members had to be over 16 years old (from 1901, 18 years old) and nominated by another member, after which they were admitted following a ballot. Members included Helena Mercier, as well as Henriëtte van der Meij, editor of the feminist publication, Belang en Recht, and Jeltje de Bosch Kemper, another leading feminist. The suffragist, Aletta Jacobs, declined to join because the Leesmuseum had no medical books. She was eventually permitted to become the only women to join the original, male-dominated reading museum, although this caused some problems. The men feared complaints from their wives if they knew that they were spending leisure hours in the company of another woman. In fact, Jacobs received critical letters from some of the wives. Some of the members of the Leesmuseum voor Vrouwen were also criticised, for "neglecting their families".

The Leesmuseum did not initially function as a lending library, it being intended that the women would read the books and magazines on the premises. Every opportunity was given to reading in the library: the library was open almost every day (including Sunday) from 10.00 to 22.00. There were books in English, French and German and, later, Norwegian and Italian, as well as Dutch. In addition to novels and classical literature, the Leesmuseum also offered newspapers, popular science books and magazines. There was regular debate about whether to buy certain books, for example the work of Émile Zola, and about which magazines to subscribe to. Occasionally, a catalogue of the library's contents was prepared and printed for the members to buy and take home.

The First World War and its aftermath left their mark on the Leesmuseum, as did the collapse of the women's movement after obtaining the right to vote in 1919. The number of members fell sharply and the large house on Herengracht became too expensive. The library moved to P.C. Hooftstraat 148. A board member and a wealthy artist, Riet van Blaaderen-Hoogendijk, bought the house and rented it to the library. From the 1930s men were permitted to join, although few did. The library survived Nazi occupation of the Netherlands, although many non-Dutch books had to be hidden. In 1952, a children's corner was introduced. However, membership declined and the Leesmuseum was forced to close in 1966.

After its closure, the books and periodicals were shared between the library of the University of Amsterdam and public library reading rooms. Other documentation, consisting of handwritten board minutes, annual reports, minutes of annual general meetings, some official documents, such as statutes, rental and employment contracts, catalogues and newspaper and magazine clippings, went to the Amsterdam City Archives.
