= Helena Mercier =

Dutch 19th-century social reformer (1839 – 1910)

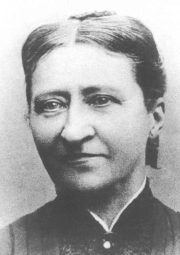
- Born: 17 October 1839; Amsterdam, Netherlands
- Died: 1 February 1910 (aged 70); Amsterdam, Netherlands
- Occupation: Social worker
- Known for: Writings on feminism and social welfare; establishing Amsterdam’s first community kitchen; promoting social housing and adult education; inspiring development of first school of social work in the Netherlands
- Spouse: Unmarried

Helena Mercier (17 October 1839 – 1 February 1910) was a Dutch social-liberal feminist, a social reformer, a writer, and one of the founders of the idea of social work in the Netherlands.

== Early life ==
Helena Mercier was born in Amsterdam, Netherlands on 17 October 1839. She was the daughter of Carel Eduard Mercier, a commission agent, and Francijntje Fonger, members of the liberal Dutch Reformed Church. She was the sixth of eight siblings. She went to school until she was fifteen, after which she devoted herself exclusively to looking after her father who had fallen ill. After his death, she was too old to return to school. Moreover, she was, herself, not well, suffering from a "nervous disorder". In 1861 she began to prepare to take an exam to become a teacher but she was unable to take this until 1869, due to a long illness. In 1870 she met the Amsterdam Hogere Burgerschool teacher Willem Doorenbos, who was an advocate of women's emancipation. Thanks, in part, to him, her interest in literature and the position of women developed.

== Feminism ==
Mercier published her first articles in 1870, under the pseudonym of Stella, in Onze Roeping Orgaan voor de Nederlandsche Vrouw (Onze Roeping. Organ of the Dutch woman). In it she drew the attention of parents to the fact that their daughters were brought up to be 'fluff and waste of time' and that they, especially unmarried women, were condemned to a purposeless life. In her book Verbonden Schakels (Linked Shackles), she published a collection of articles that for the most part had appeared between 1878 and 1888 in the magazines Vragen des Tijds and, later, Sociaal Weekblad. In these articles she argued for better education for women. At first, she thought that this should mainly serve as preparation for marriage and that only unmarried women without money needed paid work. In later articles she considered paid work useful for all women.

Mercier's writings emphasized the importance of cooperation between men and women. Partly for this reason, she kept aloof from specific women's organizations. Mercier thought social work was particularly suitable for women because it was where qualities such as empathy and caring could best come into their own. As there were as yet no educational institutes for social work, she referred women to the colleges of political economy and psychology and ethics at the University of Amsterdam and to the Leesmuseum voor Vrouwen (Reading Museum for Women), which had been co-founded by her sister-in-law W.F. Mercier-Meder in 1877. She saw social work as more suitable for women, while she considered science primarily as the domain of men, to which only a few women would be attracted.

In principle, Mercier was in favour of women's suffrage. However, she wanted to give priority to the creation of education and employment for women. Only when women had sufficient insight into the structure of society should they be given the right to vote. She opposed the Labour Act of 1889, which barred women from certain forms of hazardous work, because she believed that women and men should be treated equally.

== Social work ==
Mercier's social commitment was nurtured by contacts with well-known social liberals. Around 1880 she met Arnold Kerdijk, a journalist and liberal politician, thus beginning a lifelong friendship. In 1884 she wrote that in the "social question" she had found an area to which she wanted to devote the rest of her life. Her social involvement did not lead her to promoting socialism. She rejected the class struggle and saw cooperation and mutual understanding between classes as a precondition for the emergence of a better society. Instead of revolutionary upheaval, she advocated a gradual transformation of society, not through charity but by encouraging workers to practice "self-help".

Mercier also believed that socialists assumed too easily that the "liberation of the proletariat" would inevitably be followed by the emancipation of women. Mercier was convinced that a thorough knowledge of social issues was a prerequisite for practical action. She studied many topics and wrote in Eigen Haard and in the Sociaal Weekblad, which had been founded by Kerdijk in 1887, on such diverse subjects as the nutritional status of the working class; housing issues; labour in factories; workers' clubs in America; production cooperatives in France; the work of Arnold Toynbee; the ideas of state socialism of Edward Bellamy, as published in his popular book, Looking Backward, 2000–1887; the reforming work of Samuel Augustus Barnett and his wife Henrietta Octavia Weston Rowland; the results of a labour survey of 1890; and a survey of workers' budgets. Mercier obtained income from translation and correction work for the Algemeen Nederlandsch Werklieden-Verbond (ANWV), one of the first Dutch trade union federations. In addition, she and her sister Elise, with whom she lived all her life, were financially supported by their brothers, although she was unhappy about that.

Mercier became one of the founders of social work in the Netherlands. As founder or co-founder of several institutions, she created a field of work for women of her class and at the same time contributed to the improvement of social conditions. In 1887 she established the first community kitchen in the Amsterdam Jordaan district, financed by sugar refiner Willem Spakler. The aim was to provide workmen with a nutritious hot meal at an affordable price. The price, nevertheless, had to cover the costs in order to avoid the appearance of charity. In 1890 a second and third kitchen followed and a society of people's kitchens was founded. These kitchens were initially a success but, from 1893, visits decreased due to competition from kitchens offering a greater element of charity and the desire of working-class women to continue to provide the hot meal themselves. The kitchens had to be closed in 1899.

Mercier is mainly remembered as the person who made the public aware of the slums of Amsterdam, which were largely the consequence of the Industrial Revolution and its need for factory workers. She played an important role in the discussions about housing that eventually led to the Housing Act of 1901. After a tour of the Amsterdam Jordaan and other working-class neighbourhoods, led by the doctor and suffragist, Aletta Jacobs, she wrote a series of articles about housing for workers. In these she discussed initiatives to improve the housing situation of the working class in the Netherlands and other countries, with particular enthusiasm for the work of Octavia Hill in London. The importance that Mercier attached to good housing as a way of improving the condition of the working class was apparent from her share in the founding of the company, N.V. Bouwonderneming Jordaan, in 1896. With money from the philanthropist Peter Wilhelm Janssen, 131 slums in the Jordaan were bought, converted into good working-class houses and placed under the supervision of the social worker, Louise Went. Although Mercier did not sit on the board of the company, she remained closely involved in the work after its foundation.

The third area that Mercier became involved with was inspired by the work of Arnold Toynbee. With financial help from Janssen, the school, Ons Huis (Our House), was opened in 1892 in Amsterdam. Mercier was closely involved in the content of the lessons, courses, lectures and clubs that Ons Huis offered and which were intended for children, women and men. Although she did not want to take on the management of Ons Huis because she believed that a man as director would be better able to attract male visitors, she was part of the board and left a strong mark on the working method and content of the programmes. The fourth area she became involved with was the establishment of a School voor Maatschappelijk Werk (School for Social Work). The initiative for this came from Marie Muller-Lulofs, who was inspired by Mercier's article On the threshold of social life, which had been published in 1885. Mercier had argued that women should only engage in social work with a solid knowledge of society. She turned down an application to become the headmistress of the school on health grounds and because of her age. However, she remained closely involved in the progress of the school.

== Awards ==
Mercier was made a knight in the Order of Orange-Nassau in 1896.

== Death and legacy ==
Mercier died in Amsterdam on 1 February 1910. She never married. Four streets in the Netherlands have been named after her. A plaque on the building that housed Ons Huis, in Rozenstraat, Amsterdam, records her role.

Mercier was a pioneer, who inspired many Dutch women. A large number of women followed in her footsteps including Muller-Lulofs, who founded a children's home in Utrecht for after-school care in 1904, with the aim of providing children of working mothers with a safe and healthy home while the mothers were still working. Emilie Knappert (1860–1952) was the founder of the Leidse Volkshuis, a social meeting place for workers in Leiden, and from 1915 to 1926 was one of the directors of the School for Social Work. Finally, Johanna ter Meulen (1867–1933) played an important role in the development of social housing.
