= Emilie Knappert =

Dutch social worker

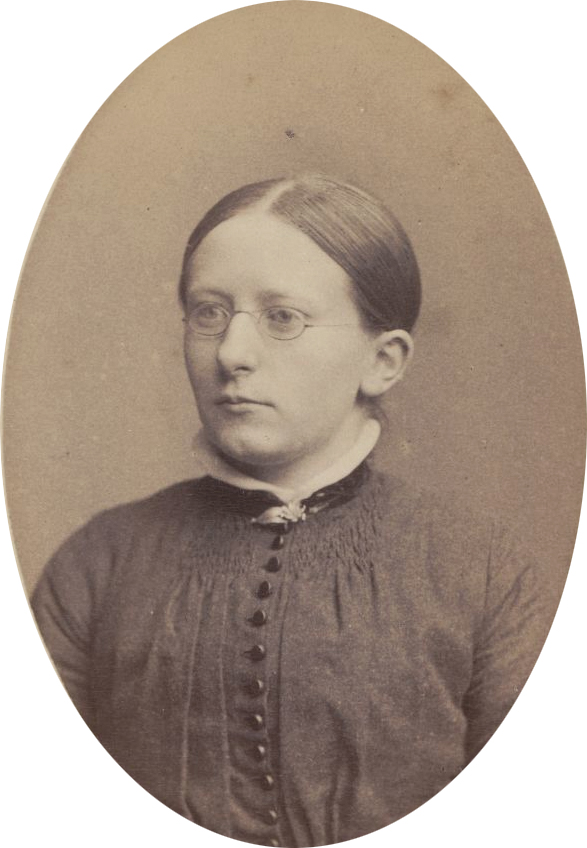
- Born: Emilie Charlotte Knappert; 15 June 1860; Schiedam, Netherlands
- Died: 22 September 1952 (aged 92); Santpoort
- Occupations: Teacher; social worker
- Known for: Establishment of several institutions for workers including the Leiden Volkshuis; director of the Amsterdam School of Social Work

Emilie Knappert (1860–1952) was a Dutch social worker who founded several important social work organizations in the Netherlands, including the Leiden Volkshuis (People's House), and was the director of the Amsterdam School of Social Work from 1915 to 1926.

== Early life ==
Emilie Charlotte Knappert was born in Schiedam in what is now the Rotterdam–The Hague metropolitan area of the Netherlands on 15 June 1860. She was the daughter of Adrianus Knappert, a gin distiller who later became a bank manager, and Arnolda Antonia Knappert. She was the eldest of eight children in a liberal, upper middle-class family. From childhood, Knappert showed great interest in religious issues, following her uncle Jan Knappert, who was a minister.

Studying at home, Knappert received the French secondary education certificate and then obtained a job in a girls boarding school in The Hague. In her spare time, she followed a religious education course provided by the Vrijzinnige Geloofsgemeenschap NPB (Liberal Community of Faith of the Netherlands Protestant Association). She also attended evening courses on the Hebrew language, given by a Professor Van Oort. In 1885 she moved into his house to give catechism lessons to young people from liberal Protestant backgrounds. For thirteen years she would devote much of her time to this. At the Van Oort home, Knappert met liberal and socially aware intellectuals. They pointed her to the work of Thomas Carlyle, John Ruskin and William Morris, critics of industrial society in Victorian era Britain. Helena Mercier's articles in the Sociaal Weekblad (Social Weekly) were also important, alerting her to the work of Arnold Toynbee and to Toynbee Hall, a workers' centre in London that was set up by Samuel Augustus Barnett and his wife Henrietta Octavia Weston Rowland.

== Social work ==
In 1890, Knappert established the Institution for Factory Girls. She organized a group of 12 middle-class female volunteers who, every week, each received ten girls at home, where they read aloud or talked about serious subjects while making crafts. In 1894, the efforts of Knappert and Oort led to the establishment of a neighbourhood building in a working class district of Leiden, called Geloof, Hoop, Liefde (Faith, Hope and Love). In addition to the club for children, young people and even adults, this building hosted drawing and literacy courses, as well as a choir. A library and savings bank were established and a labour cooperative was successfully promoted. In 1898, Knappert introduced professional British-style district nursing in the same working-class neighbourhood, while running a crusade against alcoholism. In 1896, she was one of the speakers at the First National Congress for Abstinence from Alcoholic Beverages. She was also closely involved with preparations for the National Exhibition of Women's Labour, which was held in The Hague in the summer of 1898. She chaired meetings on social work and on vocational training for women. During this period, she campaigned for the appointment of factory inspectors, a legal employment contract and shortening of the working day for women.

Thanks to support from Hendrik Lodewijk Drucker, a liberal politician and half-brother of the feminist Wilhelmina Drucker and from Peter Wilhelm Janssen, it proved possible to establish a Volkshuis (People's House) in Leiden in 1899. Knappert became its director. Such places were found in Belgium, the Netherlands and elsewhere and were a social meeting place for workers in many cities. They provided a location for relaxation and education, but were also important for the development of the labour movement and its social struggle. She developed an impressive number of activities, including the volunteer-led weekly clubs for reading, discussing and craft making. A wide range of classes and courses were given and lectures were regularly held on social and cultural topics. An annual Spring Festival was organized, aimed at strengthening the sense of community. This involved singing and music performances and exhibitions of traditional industrial products, paintings, flowers and plants. The Spring Festival idea was replicated in several other People's Houses. For a while, the Leiden Volkshuis had a public reading room for workers and a library for young and old. The poor and infirm were offered the opportunity of free legal aid, and there was even a loan of art reproductions. Following a fire at a cotton factory, the main employer in the area, Knappert set up a job-creation programme.

In 1909 Knappert started organizing weekends at the seaside for children. This led to the establishment of an institution she called Buitenbedrijf, whose aim was to allow working-class youth to spend a week's holiday outdoors. Most manufacturers supported this initiative, although at that time no holiday or vacation pay was given. In February 1918, the first stone was laid for a holiday residence for factory girls in Noordwijkerhout, just to the north of Leiden and other holiday homes were established in Hilversum and, for boys, in Nunspeet. In 1899, she had been invited to be director of the School voor Maatschappelijk Werk (School for Social Work) in Amsterdam but had declined because of her ongoing activities in Leiden. In 1915 she was approached again, and accepted the job, staying as director for 11 years. Between 1916 and 1936 she edited, together with Annie Salomons, a monthly magazine for girls and young women, called Leven en Werken (Living and Working). She also contributed to the Dutch Garden City movement, which was based on the ideas of Ebenezer Howard, and to the Dutch Association of People's Houses. She was also a much sought-after speaker, her favourite topics being Dante, John Ruskin, William Wordsworth and Chartres Cathedral.

== Death ==
The last years of her life were spent in Bentveld near Haarlem. She lived frugally. Over the years, her pearl necklace shortened, as she donated a pearl from time to time for activities she sympathized with. Knappert maintained close ties with the Woodbrookers Association of Workers Community, inspired by the Quaker-run Woodbrooke College in the UK. In 1937, when the financial situation of the Buitenbedrijf deteriorated, she transferred its properties to the Woodbrookers. She died in Santpoort on 22 September 1952.

In Leiden, a street and a secondary school are named after her.
