= Cécile de Jong van Beek en Donk =

Dutch feminist writer

Jonkvrouw Cécile de Jong van Beek en Donk
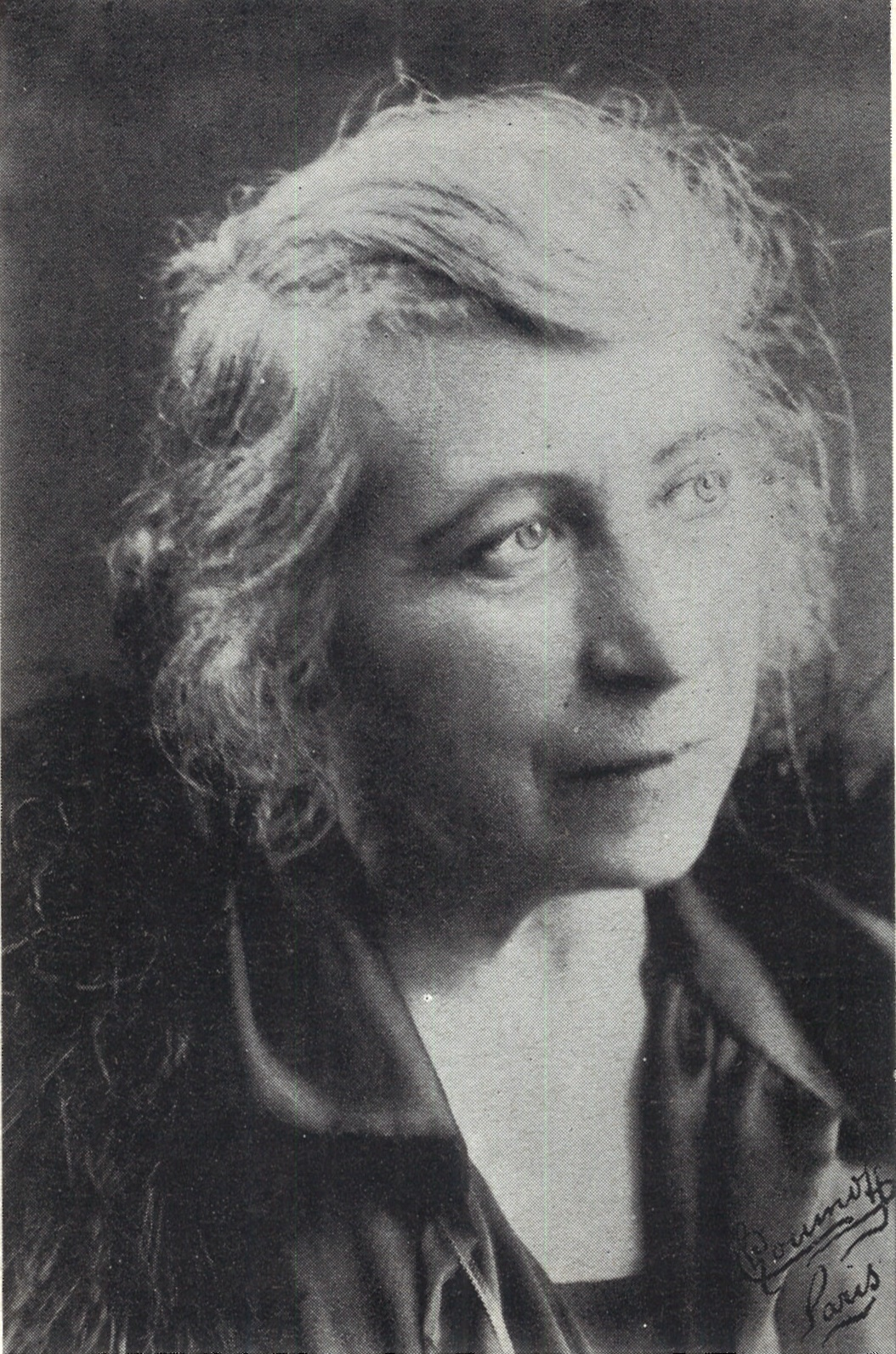
- Born: Lady Cecile Wilhelmina Elisabeth Jeanne Petronella de Jong van Beek en Donk; 19 May 1866; Alkmaar, The Netherlands
- Died: 15 June 1944 (aged 78); Méréville, France
- Occupations: Writer, feminist
- Notable work: Hilda van Suylenburg (1897)

Jkvr. Cécile Wilhelmina Elisabeth Jeanne Petronella de Jong van Beek en Donk (19 May 1866 – 5 June 1944) was a Dutch feminist writer.

== Personal life ==
De Jong was born on 19 May 1866 as the daughter of the lawyer Sir Johan Jan François de Jong van Beek en Donk and Anna Cécile Wilhelmine Jeanne Jacqueline Nahuys, as the second of three children. She married Adriaan Eliza Goekoop on 25 August 1890. The couple did not have children and the marriage was dissolved on 20 November 1899. In 1900, she moved to France. She remarried in Paris on 28 May 1904, to Michel Frenkel and gave birth to a son, Pierre Michel, in 1905. Her earlier divorce had caused a break with her family, and her death in Méréville, France, on 15 June 1944 went mostly unnoticed in her native country, the Netherlands.

== Career ==
De Jong was a fervent feminist. Even though many historians dismissed her because she was from a higher class, she was one of the, if not the, most famous feminist authors in the Netherlands around the 1900s.

Her career as an author started in 1897. Her first published work was "Aan de vrouwen van Nederlandsch Oost-Indië" ("To the women in the Dutch East Indies"). This piece was written in honor of an exhibition about female workers. This piece was not given a lot of attention, unlike her next book "Hilda van Suylenburg" (1897) which is when her writing career really took off. This novel was a great success within the Netherlands and around it, but caused a lot of controversy. The novel encompasses a story about the first female lawyer (fictional) in the Netherlands, and also touches upon how women can build their own meaningful lives without having to depend on others. On top of that, it promotes marriages only when there is equality and love involved.

Her second novel is "Lilia" (1907) about an unmarried woman who becomes pregnant. It was not received as well as her other novel, even though there were positive reviews. She published some more texts, but none reached the fame that her very first novel did.

== Critical reception ==
Much has been written about De Jong's most famous works, Hilda van Suylenberg and Lilia. Opinions are divided on Hilda. The novel is a trend novel (nl), in which all feminist ideas from the fin de siècle are discussed. It was seen as a trend novel, because it highlights feminist ideas very strongly. Moreover, the message was seen as very, or too, obvious. Because of this pamphlet in novel form, the book did end up with the desired public, namely women from the bourgeoisie. However, the novel was criticised, because it was only focussing on higher class women, and does not give a voice to lower class women.

The novel also received positive reactions. Hilda was a role model for higher class women, because she was able to combine her career as a lawyer with a good marriage and motherhood, and the novel showed how girls can create a meaningful life. This contrasts heavily with Eline in the then also popular novel Eline Vere (1888) by Couperus. Margaretha Meijboom put her positive response like this: "Now it gave words and forms – powerful and striking! – to what unknowingly lived and caused struggle in so many women's hearts." And she called it "the spark in the gunpowder".

Hilda van Suylenberg was even compared to Uncle Tom's Cabin (1852), because it also ruffled a few feathers. However, it was also said that the book contains too many extreme characters, which would reduce the believability. In addition, according to Henriëtte Roland Holst bourgeois feminism would distract from true socialism.

Recent researchers call the novel the most read and discussed Dutch novel of the fin de siècle.

According to literary critic Henri Smissaert, De Jong's second novel Lilia depicted too much immoral behavior, and did not offer a counter perspective to this behavior. This prevented the readers from seeing Lilia like she really was. Moreover, Lilia is not ashamed of her immoral behavior and her illegitimate child. On the other hand, Smissaert says, she is a person of flesh and blood, in contrast to Hilda and Corona in Hilda van Suylenberg. Lilia's free love was seen as the demise of morality. Author Anna de Savornin Lohman argues that it is bad to exercise free love, because the change in morality would not lead to the liberation of women. In addition, Lilia is seen as egoistic, because she only thinks about herself and not about her child, who will now have to live with the backlog that Lilia has given him as an outcast. The story is also unbelievable, according to Lohman, because the novel ends where the struggle begins in real life.

== Works ==
- Aan de vrouwen van Nederlandsch Oost-Indië (1897); [To the women of the Dutch East Indies]
- Hilda van Suylenberg (1897)
- Lilia (1907)
- De geschiedenis eener bom (1912), translation with an introduction from the Polish Dzieje jednego pocisku by Andrzej Strug (1910)
- La Marchande de cierges (1929); Dutch publication: Bij de waskaarsen (1930)
