= Annie Salomons =

Dutch writer, poet and translator (1885–1980)

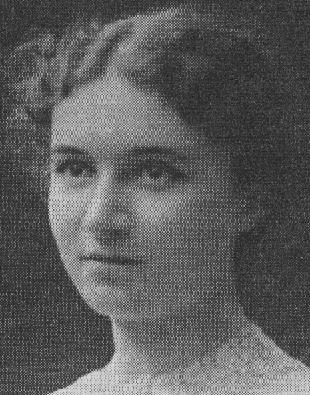
- Salomons in 1905
- Born: Anna Maria Francisca Salomons; 26 June 1885; Rotterdam, Netherlands
- Died: 16 January 1980 (aged 94); The Hague, Netherlands
- Occupation: Writer
- Notable work: Memories of the old days of writers I personally knew
- Spouse: Henri (Han) van Wageningen

Annie Salomons (1885–1980) was a Dutch writer, poet and translator.

== Early life and poetry ==
Anna Maria Francisca van Wageningen-Salomons was born in Rotterdam in the Netherlands on 26 June 1885, second daughter of Constant Theodor Salomons, director of a gasworks, and Trinette Marie Catherine Kortman-Salomons. The family lived in a large house next to the gasworks, which was remote from other middle-class houses and other children. She has written that she had a lonely childhood after her sister went to school. At the age of 16 she was in love with the poet Carel Gerretson and they remained friends until his death in 1958. After leaving secondary school, she taught at the Gymnasium Erasmianum in Rotterdam, before following her sister to Leiden University, where she studied Dutch literature, and then to Utrecht University. She ended her studies in 1910, without having taken an exam, and then returned to live with her parents, who had by then moved to The Hague. She stayed with them until her marriage in 1924 to the lawyer Henri (Han) van Wageningen. Her husband was a few years younger than she and came from a Dutch Reformed Church family. He converted to Roman Catholicism in order to marry her. They spent their honeymoon in Ireland.

Salomons contributed to many magazines from an early age. Encouraged by Johan de Meester Sr. she initially wrote poetry, which was first published in Jong Holland, when she was 16. Johan de Meester was art editor at the Nieuwe Rotterdamsche Courant, and placed some of her poems in his newspaper. He also introduced her to the publisher Van Dishoeck, who would later publish her first works in book form, starting with Verzen (1905). At the age of eighteen she had become a member of the Vereniging van Letterkundigen (Association of Literary Experts), proof to her that she was taken seriously by professionals. Verzen, tweede bundel (Verses. Second Collection), published in 1910 shows maturity and mastery of form. Her early poems were admired, among other things, for their boldness in expressing what was going on inside her.

== Early writing ==
As a writer of novels Salomons made her debut with Een meisje-studentje (A Girl Student) in 1907. She mainly became known for her novels, which dealt with the awareness of women. She came to the conclusion that women were equal to men but saw men as leaders in the marriage. She also thought that the men were better able to think abstractly and intellectually. She believed that studying meant something different for a girl than it did for a boy, in that a girl's study was less career-oriented. The book was not appreciated by women who had successfully penetrated academia nor by female contemporaries who had studied with serious intentions. A further novel was De Oude Doen (The Old Debt), published in 1922 under the pseudonym of Ada Gerlo, with the theme of a problematic marital relationship. She had more success with Herinneringen van een onafhankelijke vrouw (Memories of an Independent Woman), published in 1915 under the same pseudonym.

In 1916, Salomons started working with the social worker, Emilie Knappert, on a monthly magazine for girls and young women, called Leven en Werken (Living and Working). As a journalist, Salomons had a regular column in De Nieuwe Groene, which was presented under the title 'What a woman thinks about...', and then in De Groene Amsterdammer. The latter articles were to cause some problems when she moved to Sumatra as, inevitably, copies of De Groene Amsterdammer found their way there and her neighbours were all suspicious that she was writing about them.

== Sumatra ==
From 1924 to 1927 she lived with her husband in Medan on Sumatra, in the Dutch East Indies, although she made two trips back to the Netherlands because of the deaths of her parents. Han van Wageningen could make a good career there as a judge, but Salomons did not tolerate the heat well. After three years they returned to the Netherlands to settle in Utrecht and then The Hague, where Van Wageningen had been appointed as judge. She would write about her experiences in Ballingen. Indische Roman (Exiles. Indies novel), Verhalen uit het verre Oosten (Stories from the Far East) and in Het huis in de hitte: drie jaar Deli (The house in the heat: three years of Deli) in 1933, which included a description of a trip to an opium den. "Deli" refers to the Deli Serdang Regency, which surrounds Medan.

== Later writing ==
Salomons' husband died in 1941 and this, and World War II, led to a long hiatus in her writing activities. Her home was damaged as a result of the Bombing of the Bezuidenhout in 1945 and she was forced to leave it, moving to live with a friend in Amersfoort. She published nothing between 1937 and 1950.

Salomons met many of the leading Dutch writers of the time. Among the men were Lodewijk van Deyssel, Frederik van Eeden, Louis Couperus, J. H. Leopold, Pieter Cornelis Boutens, J.C. Bloem and Adriaan Roland Holst. Among the women writers, she knew Top Naeff, Ina Boudier-Bakker, Carry van Bruggen and Margo Scharten-Antink. Without her having sought or wished for it, there was a revival of her writing around 1947. She owed this to a temporary stay in the country house De Pauwhof in Wassenaar, which was a large house where writers, painters, musicians, could stay to concentrate on their work. In conversations in the house, she often talked about her memories of writers and poets she had known. She was persuaded to put her memories on paper and was introduced to the publisher, Bert Bakker, who published her memoirs as Herinneringen uit de oude tijd aan schrijvers die ik persoonlijk heb gekend (Memories of the Ancient Times of Writers I've Known Personally) in 1960.

== Publications ==
Salomons' publications were:

- 1905 - Verzen (poëzie) (Verses)
- 1907 - Een meisje-studentje (A Girl Student)
- 1910 - Verzen, tweede bundel (Verses, second collection)
- 1912 - De vrouw in de Nederlandse letterkunde (The woman in Dutch literature)
- 1913 - Langs het geluk (Along happiness)
- 1915 - Herinneringen van een onafhankelijke vrouw (Memories of an Independent Woman - under pseudonym of Ada Gerlo)
- 1916 - De stille lach (The silent laugh (with Nico van Suchtelen)
- 1917 - Nieuwe verzen (New Verses)
- 1919 - Daadlooze droomen (Dreamless Dreams - under pseudonym of Ada Gerlo)
- 1922 - De oude schuld (The old debt - under pseudonym of Ada Gerlo)
- 1926 - Over mooie boeken (About beautiful books)
- 1926 - Liederen van droom en derven (Songs of Dreams and Losses - poetry)
- 1927 - Ballingen. Indische roman (Exiles. Indies novel)
- 1930 - Verhalen uit het verre Oosten (Stories from the Far East)
- 1931 - Van vrijen tot schreien (From making love to crying)
- 1933 - Een meisje en een jongetje (A girl and a boy)
- 1933 - Het huis in de hitte: drie jaar Deli (The house in the heat: three years of Deli)
- 1950 - De ongerepte droom (The Untouched Dream - poetry anthology)
- 1957 - Heilige stenen en andere verhalen (Sacred Stones and Other Stories - anthology)
- 1957 - Toen en nu. Herinneringen uit een lang leven (Then and Now. Memories of a long life)
- 1960 - Herinneringen uit de oude tijd aan schrijvers die ik persoonlijk heb gekend (Memories of the old days of writers I personally knew) Parts 1 and 2
- 1962 - Nog meer herinneringen uit de oude tijd (Even more memories from the old days)

== Awards ==
In 1975 Salomons was awarded the Jacobson Prize for literature. This is given every five years to older authors for their entire Œuvre. She was also made an Officer of the Order of Orange-Nassau. She was also an honorary member of the Dutch Section of PEN International.

== Death ==
Salomons died in The Hague on 16 January 1980. She had no children.
