= Margaretha Meijboom =

Dutch social worker, feminist and translator (1856-1927)

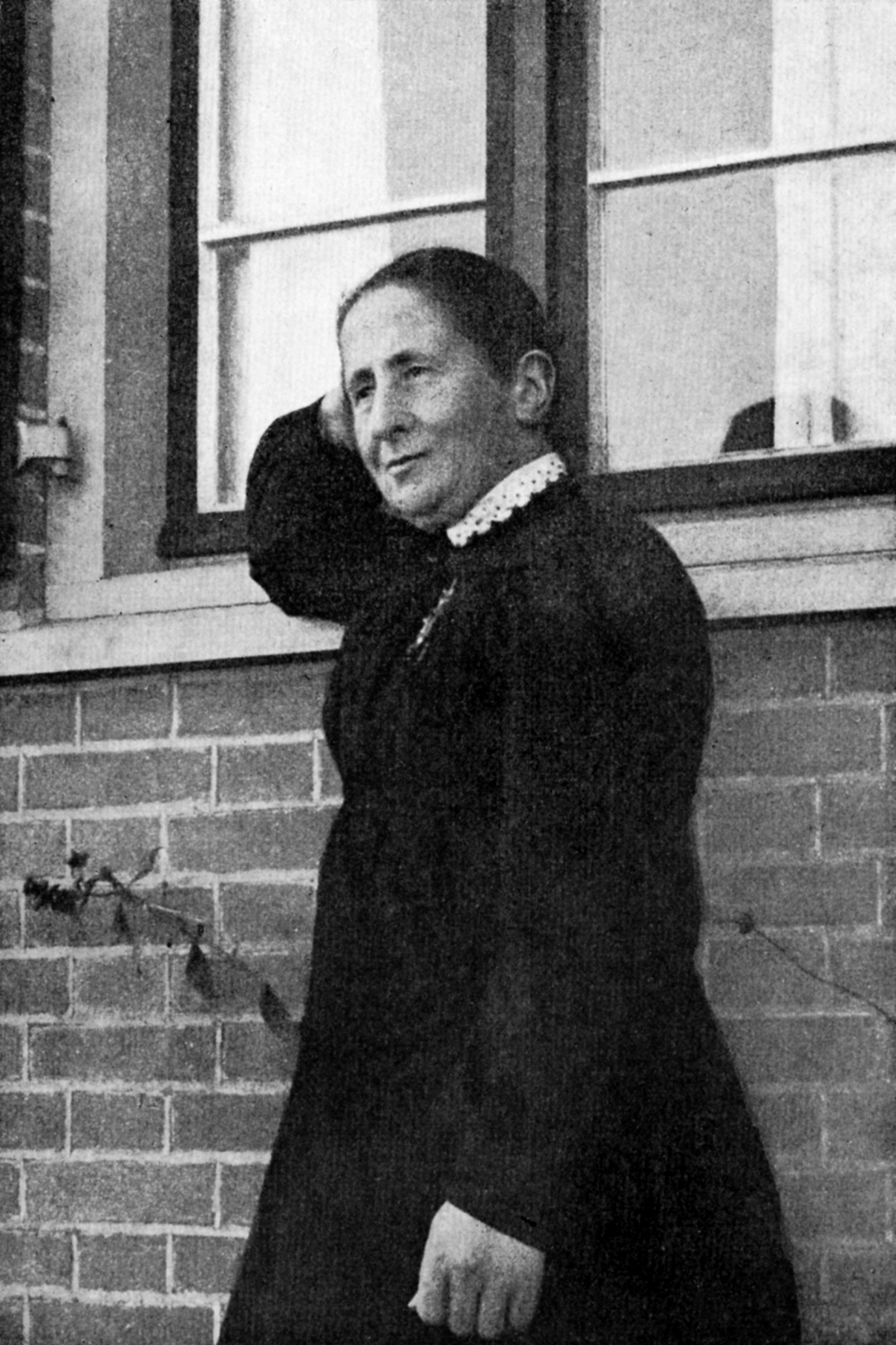
Margaretha Meijboom

Margaretha Anna Sophia Meijboom or Meyboom (29 July 1856 - 26 September 1927) was a social worker, feminist and translator of Scandinavian literature into Dutch. She introduced many Scandinavian writers to the Netherlands, such as Henrik Ibsen, Bjørnstjerne Bjørnson and Selma Lagerlöf. She resisted the idea that a woman's role in society was in the home, and founded several cooperative organisations to further women's economic independence.

She considered herself less a socialist, communist or feminist than a pacifist.

== Early life and time in Groningen ==
Margaretha Meijboom was born in Amsterdam, the second daughter in a family of five boys and three girls. Her mother was Anjes H. F. Tydeman; her father, Louis Suson Pedro Meijboom, was a liberal minister of the Dutch Reformed Church. She inherited a deep social interest from him. Thanks to her Danish ancestry, she came to know Scandinavian literature, and when she was 17 she taught herself Danish. She later became a Sunday school teacher. Her father died in 1874, and in 1881 the rest of the family moved to The Hague. There she continued to be active as a social worker and teacher.

In 1890 Meijboom travelled to Copenhagen. There she attended lectures by the linguist Otto Jespersen, and became a certified translator in Danish and Norwegian. She also came into contact with recent public developments, such as the formation of a public library and, in the Vesterbro district, the idea of a cooperative commune. After her return to the Netherlands she organised lectures on this topic and published about it.

Until 1898 she lived in Groningen with her stepbrother, the university professor Hajo Uden Meyboom, and his family. In 1894 she became a board member of the Damesleesmuseum, a public library for women in The Hague. Together with Claudine Bienfait, another translator of Scandinavian languages, she made sure that the library included beside publications on social issues as well as literature. In the early 1890s Meijboom published several remarkable articles on women and housekeeping in the Sociaal Weekblad and in a book titled Vrouwenwerk (Women's Work). Meijboom was a strong voice in the debate on the 1897 feminist novel Hilda van Suylenburg by Cecile van Beek en Donk.

In 1897 Meijboom met the Swedish writer Selma Lagerlöf. In addition to works by Lagerlöf (such as the children's book The Wonderful Adventures of Nils), she translated the work of such Scandinavian writers as Henrik Ibsen, Knut Hamsun and Bjørnstjerne Bjørnson into Dutch. She also translated into Dutch from English The Inner Life and other works by the founder of the Sufi Movement, Inayat Khan.

== The Hague ==
In 1898 Meijboom moved to The Hague, where she became involved in the founding of the organisation that was to hold the 1898 Dutch Exhibition of Women's Work, a national exhibition of women's labour inspired by an 1895 exhibition in Copenhagen. During this event the idea emerged to found a cooperative, the Coöperatieve Vereeniging 'De Wekker'. In 1901, a textile factory in The Hague was converted into a cooperative corporation, where all female workers earned a fixed salary, a share in the profit and a pension. Meijboom became president of the Governing Board. De Wekker produced and sold arts and crafts objects, small pieces of furniture and mainly reform clothing, loosely fitting dresses that replaced the corset. At its pinnacle 60 women were working for the cooperative.

From 1902 to 1904 Meijboom was editor of the weekly Lente, and in 1904 she founded the magazine Scandia. After publication of both magazines had ceased, she started the monthly Scandinavië-Nederland.

For sixteen years, Meijboom was secretary of the Dutch Cooperative Women's Association (Nederlandse Coöperatieve Vrouwenbond), founded in 1900, and wrote about women and youth in its magazine De Coöperator. She was initiator of the Broederschapsfederatie (1918), a collaborative project for theosophists, spiritualists, Esperantists, teetotalers, vegetarians and adherents of the Rein Leven (Pure Life) movement. She was also a board member of the International Cooperative Women's Guild, founded in Ghent in 1924.

== Westerbro ==
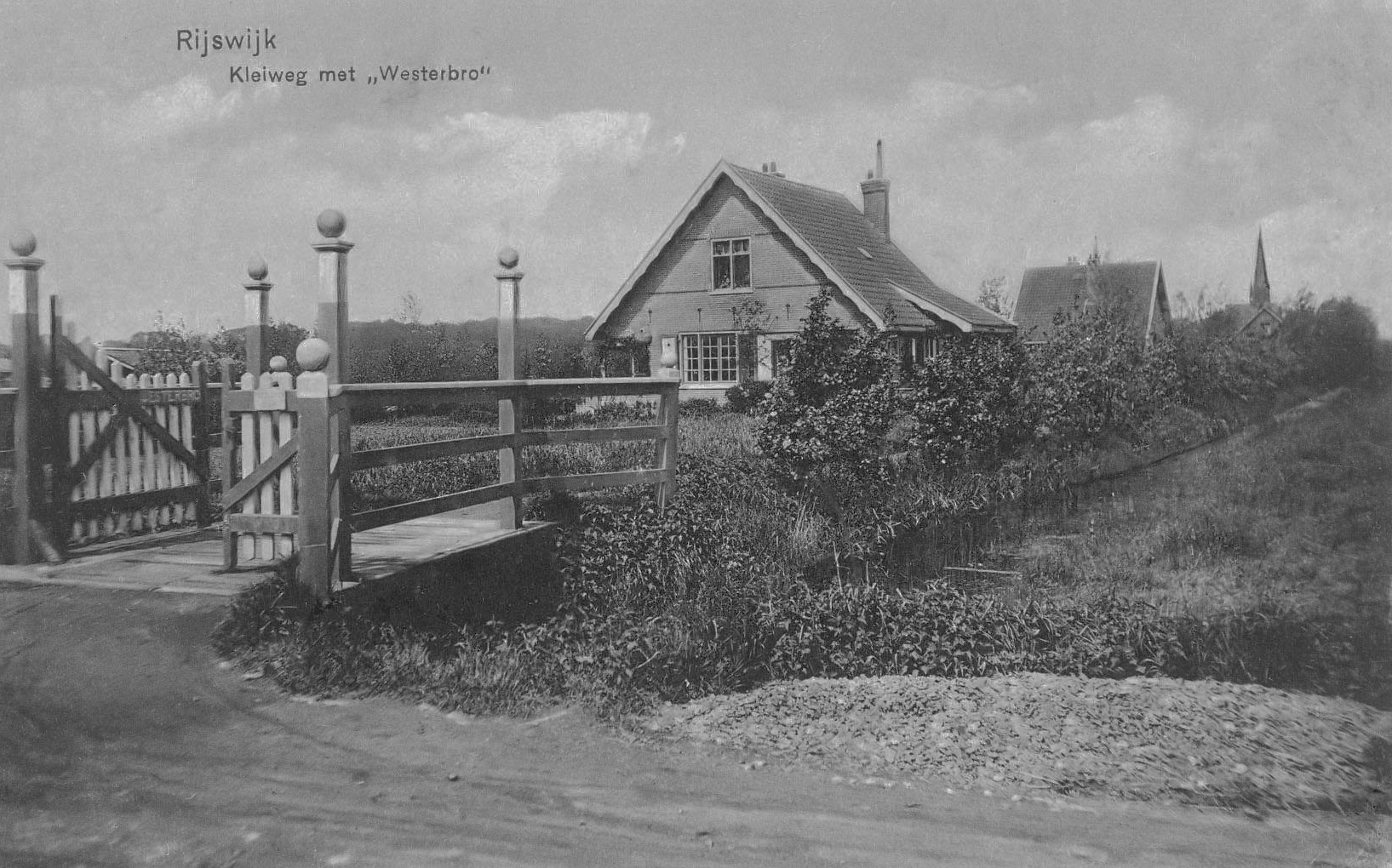
Commune Westerbro in Rijswijk

In reaction to the 1903 general strike, Meijboom came to the conclusion that a radical transformation of society was needed. She therefore co-founded, with Clara and Antonia Bokkes, the Cooperative Association 'Westerbro' in Rijswijk.

In September 1924 Meijboom and Bokkes moved to Voorburg, because of Bokkes' bad health, and founded the commune 'Nieuw Westerbro' (New Westerbro). Meijboom died there three years later. She was buried in the cemetery in Rijswijk. The Broederschapsfederatie and the Coöperatieve Vrouwenbond placed an oaken monument on her grave with the inscription: "Her mind was the key that unlocked old hearts to new world ideas."

The International Institute of Social History holds the archive of Margaretha Meyboom.

== Publications ==
- Oude wijn in nieuwe vaten (1885)
- In het klooster (1890)
- Vrouwenwerk: schetsen (1896)
- Handleiding bij het zelfonderricht van 't Deensch (Noorsch) (1896)
- De vrouwenbeweging in Nederland en Hilda van Suylenburg (1898)
- Open brief aan Anna de Savornin Lohman naar aanleiding van haar brochure 'De liefde in de vrouwenkwestie' (1899)
- De geschiedenis van 'De Wekker' (1901)
- Leercursus Deensch met spreekoefeningen in geluidschrift (1907)
- Een tuinschool (1909)
- Jonas Lie. Mannen en vrouwen van beteekenis in onze dagen; dl. 39, afl. 6 (1909)
- Henrik Ibsen en het huwelijk (1909)
- De ideale koopman voorheen en thans (1910)
- Volksbibliotheken in Noorwegen. Vlugschriften der vereeniging voor openbare leeszalen in nederland; 2 (1910)
- Skandinavische literatuur in Nederland (1911)
- Björnstjerne Björnson. Mannen en vrouwen van beteekenis in onze dagen; dl. 41, afl. 7 (1911)
- Selma Lagerlöf. Reeks Scandinavische bibliotheek; 5 (1919)
- Björnstjerne Björnson. Boven Menschelijke Kracht (vertaling 1920)
- Van en over liefde (1924)
