= Stompetoren =

- Village
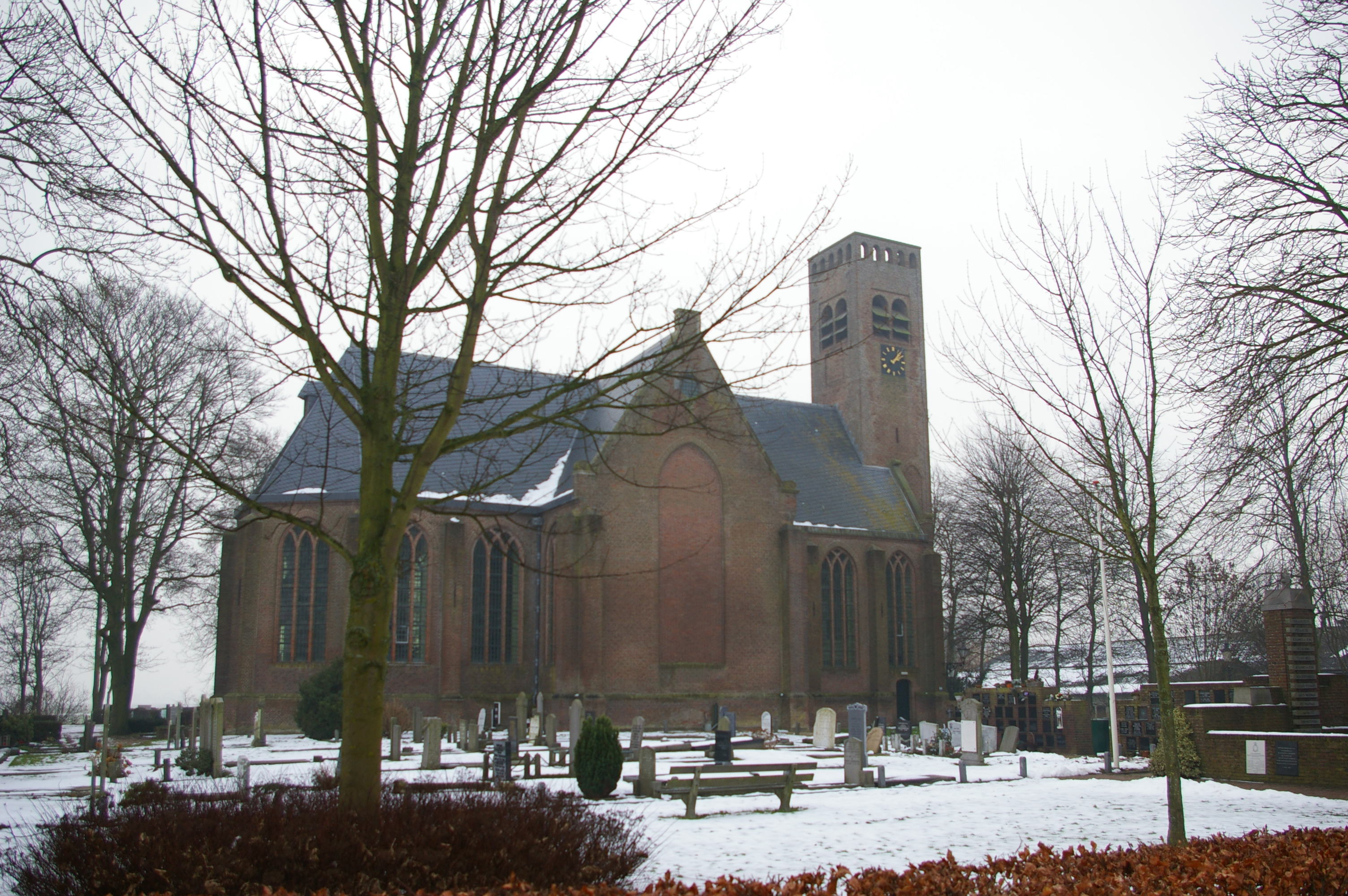
- Church with stubby tower

- Location in the Netherlands Location in the province of North Holland in the Netherlands
- Coordinates: 52°37′N 4°49′E
- Country: Netherlands
- Province: North Holland
- Municipality: Alkmaar

Area
  - Total: 11.15 km^{2} (4.31 sq mi)
- Elevation: −3.2 m (−10 ft)

Population (2021)
  - Total: 2,025
  - Density: 181.6/km^{2} (470.4/sq mi)
- Time zone: UTC+1 (CET)
  - Summer (DST): UTC+2 (CEST)
- Postal code: 1841
- Dialing code: 072

Stompetoren is a village in the Dutch province of North Holland. It is a part of the municipality of Alkmaar, and lies about 6 km southeast of the city of Alkmaar.

== History ==
The village was first mentioned in 1680 as Kerck. The current name means "stubby tower" after the shape of the Dutch Reformed church tower. Stompetoren developed after the Schermer was poldered in 1635 on the intersection of the Noordervaart with the Oterlekerweg.

The Dutch Reformed church is a single aisled church with a baluster on top of the tower, but without a spire. The church was built between 1662 and 1663. Wittenburg is an estate in Renaissance Revival style and surrounded by a moat. It was constructed in 1889 and replaces a farm. Between 1986 and 1987, it was converted to serve as town hall.

Stompetoren was home to 123 people in 1840.

== Gallery ==
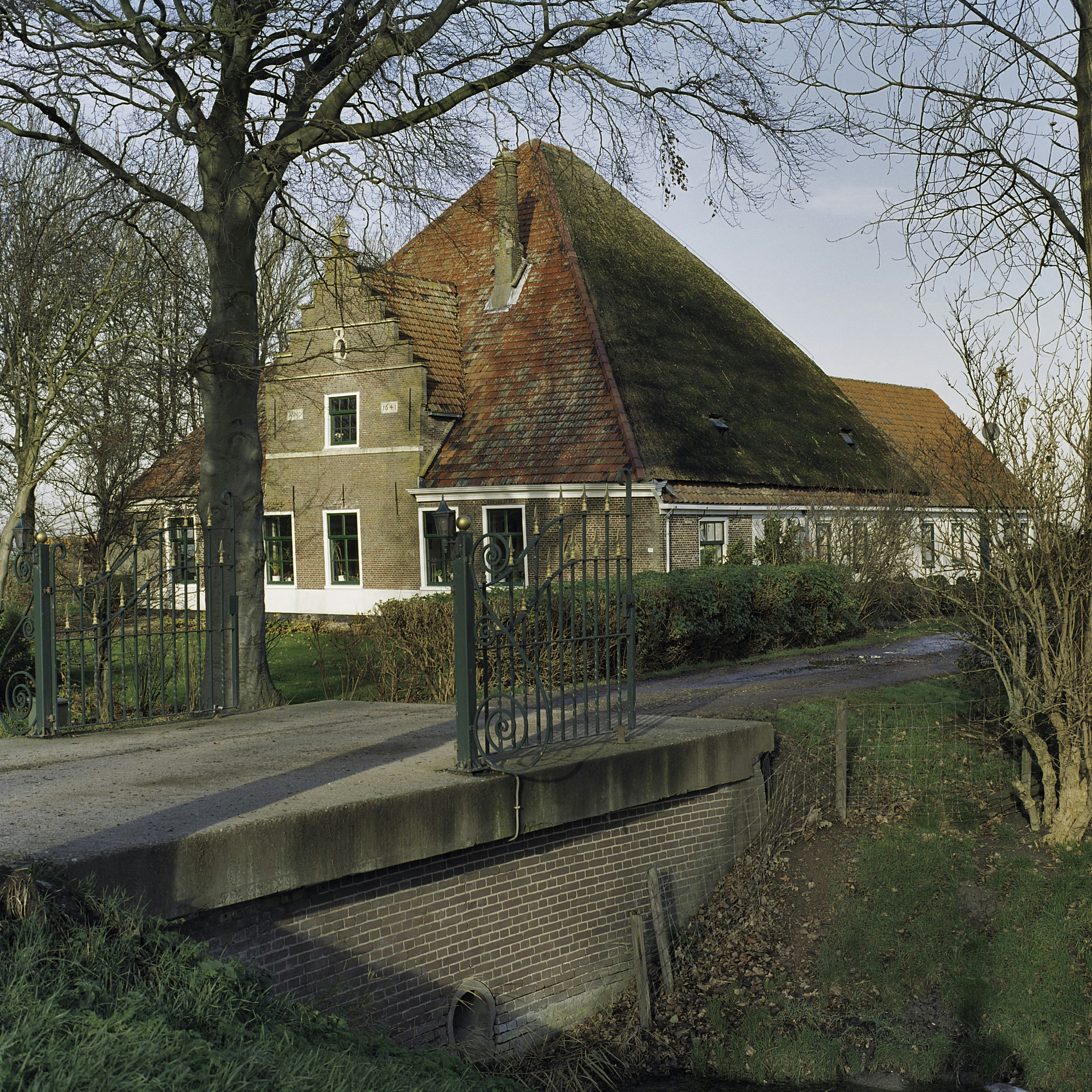
Farm in Stompetoren

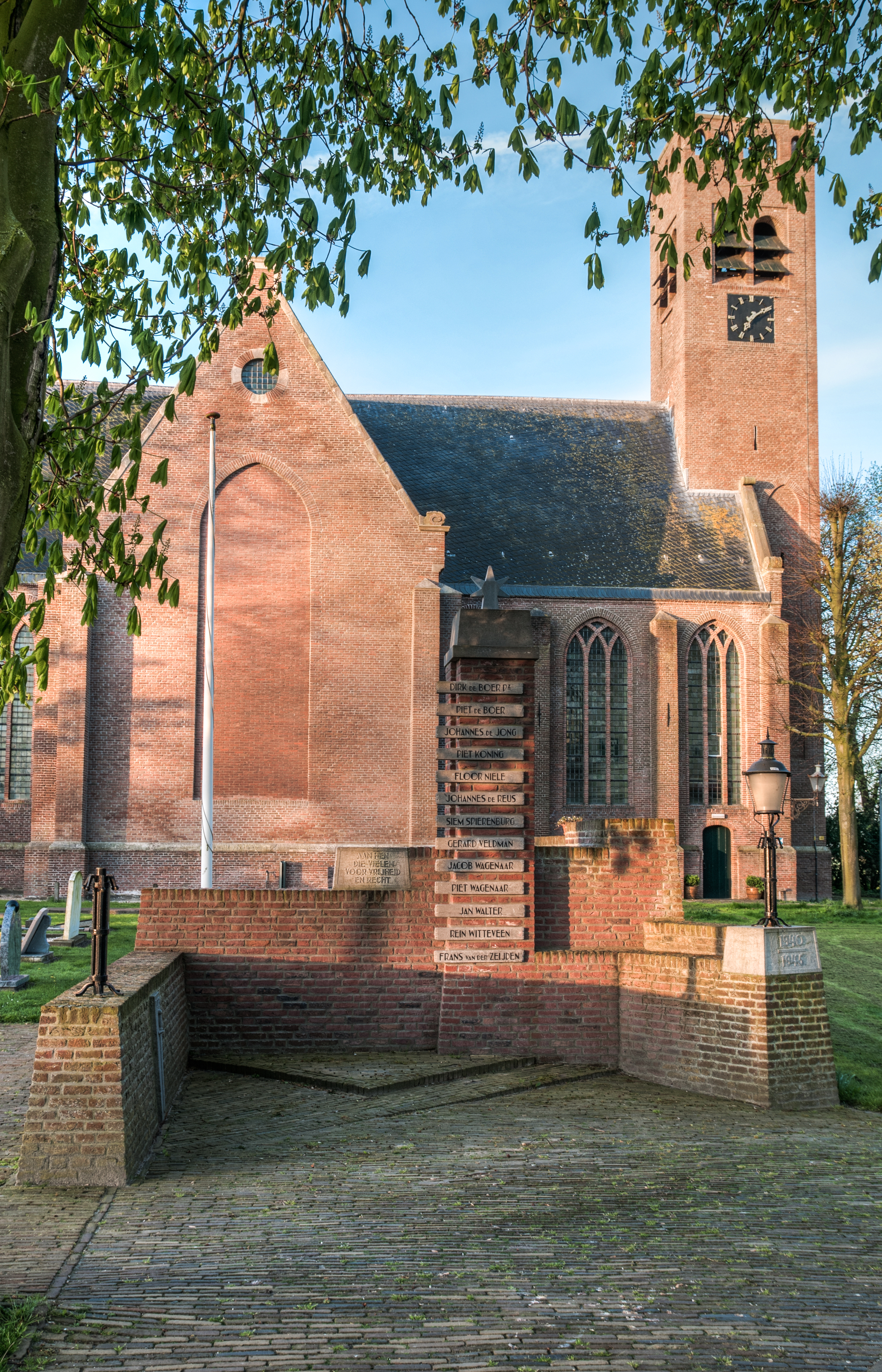
War monument in front the church

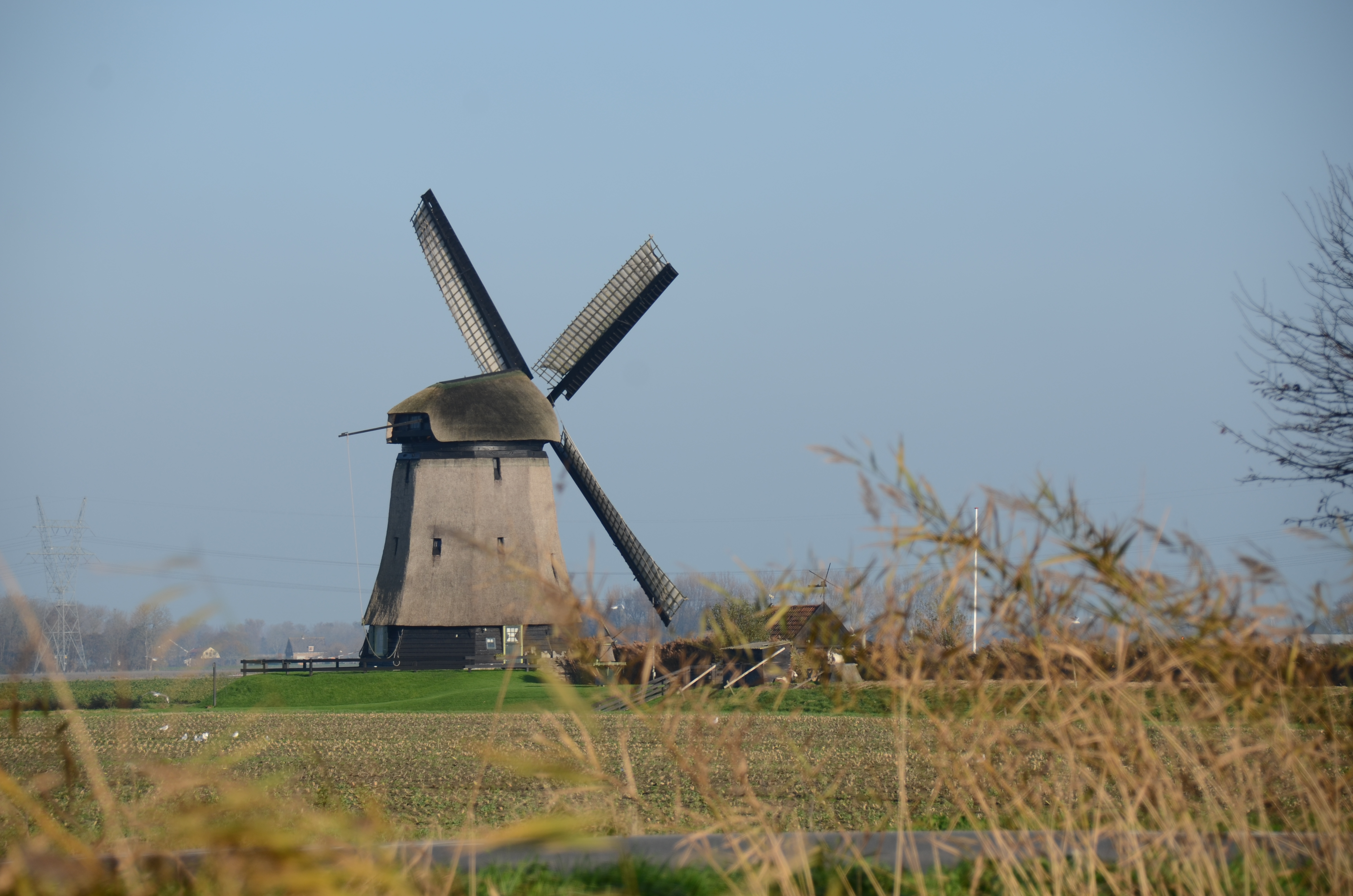
Polder mill
