= Louise Went =

Louisa Constantia Julia Eduarda Went (1 September 1865 - 29 October 1951) was a Dutch pioneer in the field of public housing and social work. She was one of the first home supervisors in the Netherlands, co-founder of the Vereeniging van Woonopzichteressen, co-founder of the first school in the world for social work and from 1936 director of the 19th-century semi-philanthropic NV Bouwonderneming 'Jordaan'.
