= Vrijzinnige Geloofsgemeenschap NPB =

Christian denomination

- Symbol of the Vrijzinnige Geloofsgemeenschap NPB, a flame.
- Abbreviation: NPB
- Type: Liberal religion
- Origin: 1870
- Separated from: Nederlands Hervormde Kerk
- Number of followers: 4385

The Vrijzinnige Geloofsgemeenschap NPB (English: Liberal Community of Faith NBP) is a liberal Christian denomination in the Netherlands, a member of the Dutch Raad van Kerken (English: Council of Churches) and the International Association for Religious Freedom. NPB stands for Nederlandse Protestanten Bond (English: Netherlands Protestant Association).

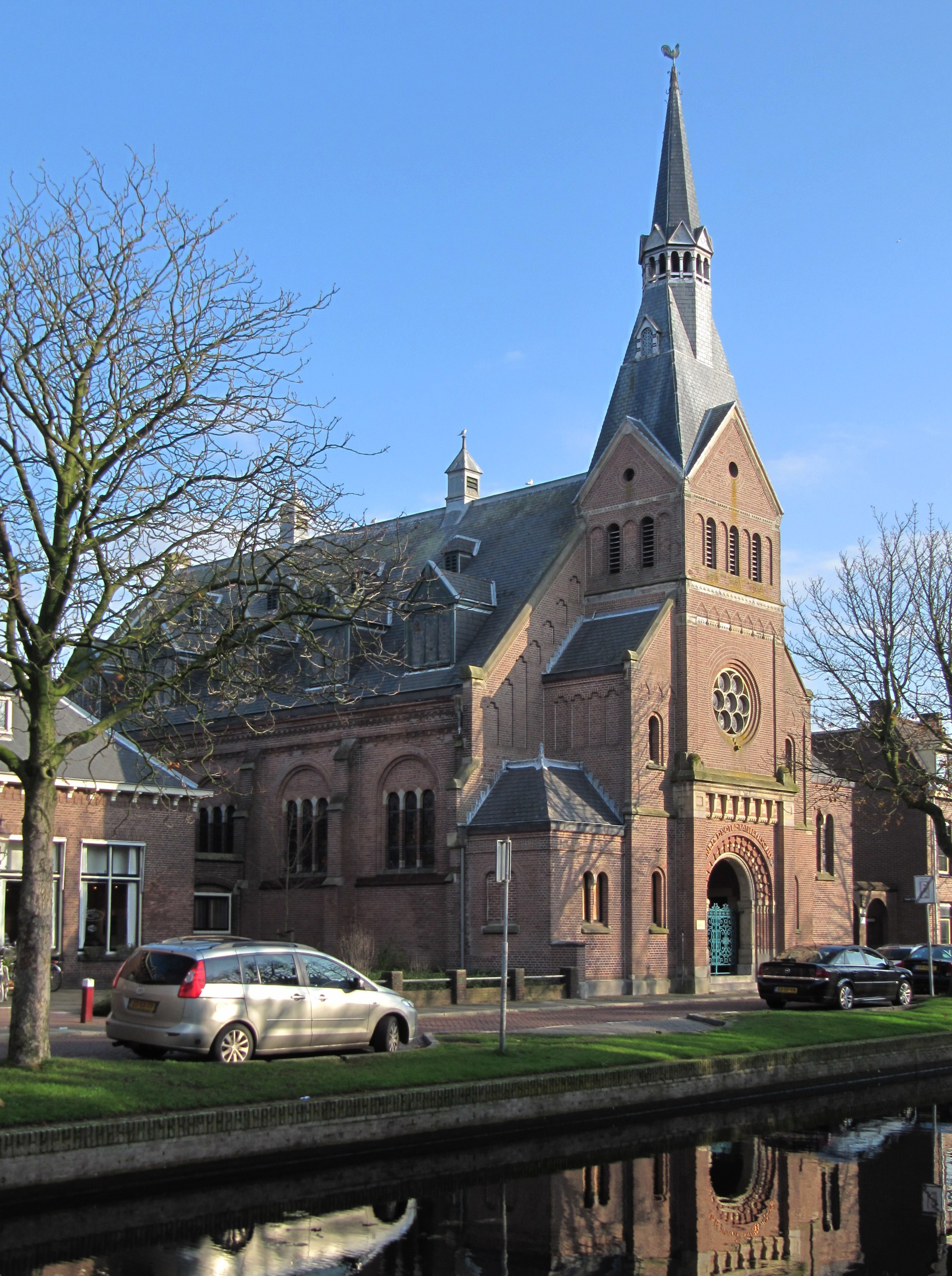
The NBP church in Weesp, the Netherlands

== Structure ==
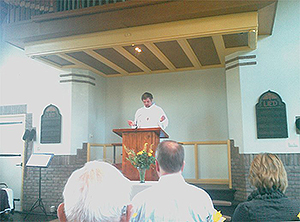
Easter service in the NPB church in Driebergen, the Netherlands.

The NPB has the structure of an association and consists of sixty independent local communities (2004) that call themselves by the neutral word afdeling (English: section).

== History ==
The Dutch Protestant Association NBP was established in 1870 by Cornelis Willem Opzoomer, Cornelis Tiele and others. It came as a reaction of liberal Protestants to the Confessionele vereniging (English: The Confessional Association) created in 1864 and Orthodox Protestantism.

From the NBP came the Centrale Commissie voor het Vrijzinnig Protestantisme (English: Central Committee for Liberal Protestantism) that established the VPRO (1926) and was involved in the Leidse Bijbelvertaling (English: The Leiden Translation of the Bible) that was used by Dutch liberal Protestants for decades to follow (1914).

== Profile and ideas ==
There can be significant differences between local communities constituting the association. Some are based upon religious humanism, some upon Christian Universalism and some upon liberal Christianity. All liberal-minded people may become members of the association regardless of membership in other Christian denominations, whether they are baptized or not or adhere to a certain creed. In liberal Protestantism the Bible is not seen as the Word of God in a literal sense, but rather as a document - a collection of meaningful stories - witnessing to the love of God. It is also striven to connect faith with the insights of modern science and with rationality.
