= The Young Mother (Dou) =

Painting by Gerrit Dou

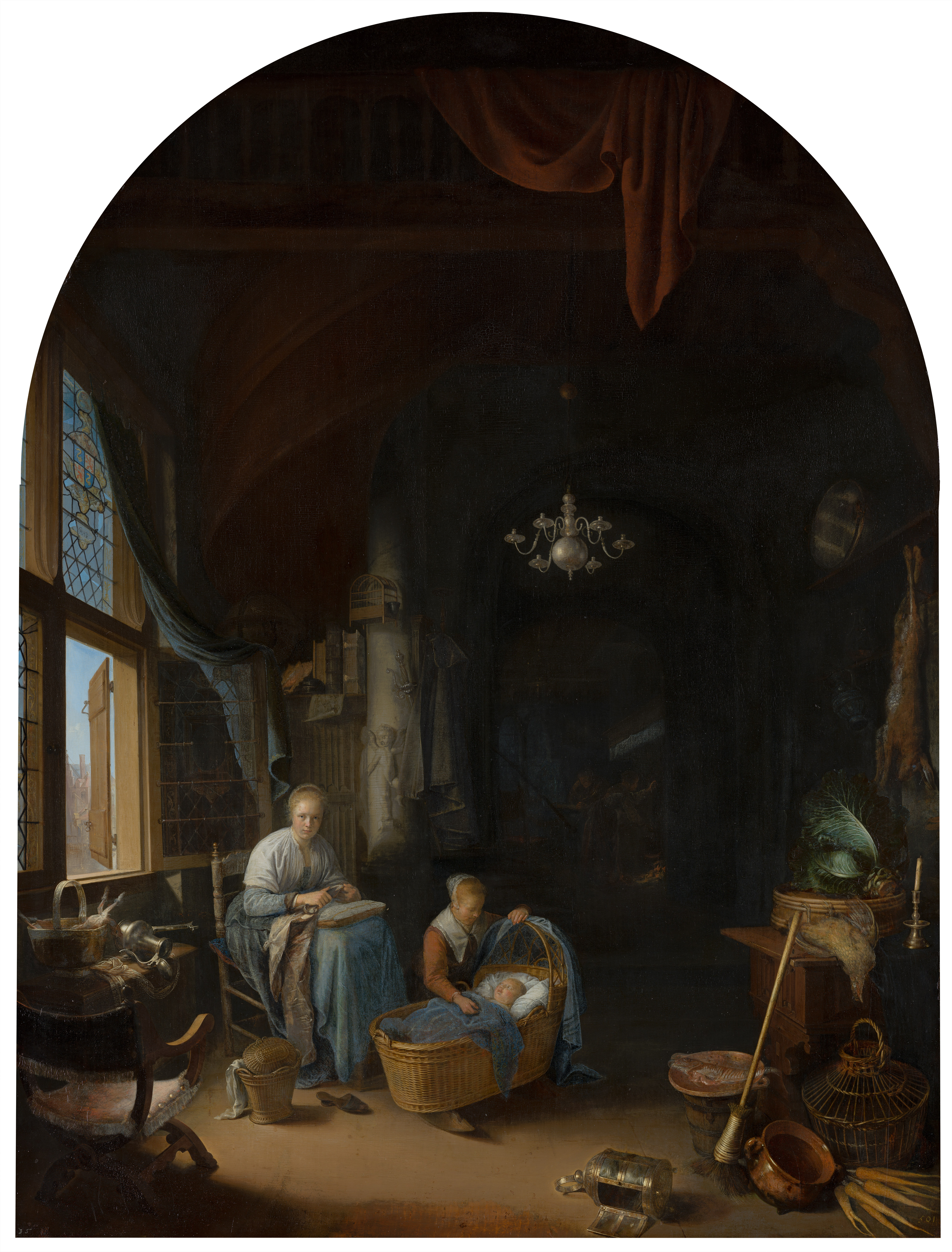
- Artist: Gerrit Dou
- Year: 1658
- Medium: Oil on panel
- Dimensions: 73.5 cm × 55.5 cm (28.9 in × 21.9 in)
- Location: Mauritshuis, The Hague

The Young Mother is an oil painting by Dutch artist Gerrit Dou, from 1658. The signature of the artist appears subtly in the stained glass window, GDOV.1658. This genre piece has been part of the collection of the Mauritshuis, in The Hague, since 1822.

== History ==
In order to appease the English king Charles II, who had just come to power, the States General of the Netherlands and the States of Holland and West Friesland offered him a large number of gifts, including about 25 paintings. The Young Mother was part of this Dutch Gift. The subject of the painting could be seen as a reference to Mary Henrietta Stuart, sister of the King and widow of Stadtholder William II of Orange. She had to watch over the interests of her son under difficult political circumstances. Charles II was extremely pleased with Dou's work and tried to bring the painter to England. Dou, however, didn't accept his invitation.

== Description ==
Although Dou was Rembrandt's pupil, he did not adopt his painting style. Dou developed a refined and polished technique that enabled him to deliver exceptionally detailed paintings. Realistic and meticulous genre paintings are therefore the trademark of the Leiden Fijnschilder, of which Dou was the leader.

In The Young Mother, a young woman is seated at the window doing needlework. She glances up from her work towards the viewer. Next to her is her baby in a crib made of wicker, cared by a maid. In the interior, which is illuminated by the sunlight that falls through the window, a striking number of objects can be seen. By the window there is a small still life with a basket, carrying the carcass of a rabbit, next to a fallen tin can. In the lower right corner, the artist shows even more objects. In apparent disarray are depicted a fallen lantern, a broom, a bunch of carrots, a fish on a plate and a dead bird. In the background, two people can still be seen vaguely by a smoldering fire.

The genre pieces from the 17th century are often full of symbolism, although this is not always immediately apparent to the contemporary viewer. For example, the handiwork of the young mother symbolizes virtue, as does the footstool that is completely covered by the woman's skirt. A Cupid can be seen on the pillar behind the woman, a reference to the (conjugal) love of which the baby is the result. The husband's cloak and sword are hung on the same pillar. The slipper on the ground and the birdcage on the pillar are also erotic symbols.

In various places in the interior, Dou painted hanging curtains that, together with the landscape that can be seen through the window, give depth to the painting.

== Provenance ==
After the painting had hung in one of the English royal palaces for decades, Statdtholder William III of Orange brought the work back to the Netherlands. Here it was placed in Het Loo Palace, as a counterpart to Rembrandt's The Song of Praise by Simeon. After some wandering, the painting ended up in the Prince William V Gallery in The Hague in 1774. In Napoleon's time, the painting went to the Louvre. After it was returned in 1815, it was first exhibited in the Prince William V Gallery and then in the Mauritshuis, since 1822.
