= Gerrit Dou =

Dutch painter (1613–1675)

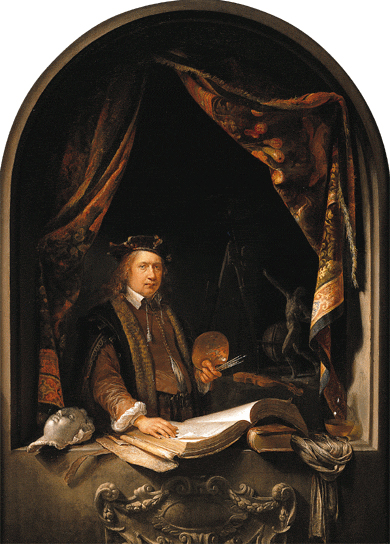
- Self-portrait (c. 1665), Museum of Fine Arts, Boston
- Born: April 7, 1613; Leiden, Dutch Republic
- Died: February 9, 1675 (aged 61); Leiden, Dutch Republic
- Education: Rembrandt (master)
- Movement: Leiden fijnschilder

Gerrit Dou (pronounced [ˈɣɛrɪt dʌu]; 7 April 1613 – 9 February 1675), also known as Gerard Douw or Dow, was a Dutch Golden Age painter, whose small, highly polished paintings are typical of the Leiden fijnschilders. He specialised in genre scenes and is noted for his trompe-l'œil "niche" paintings and candlelit night-scenes with strong chiaroscuro. He was a student of Rembrandt.

== Life ==
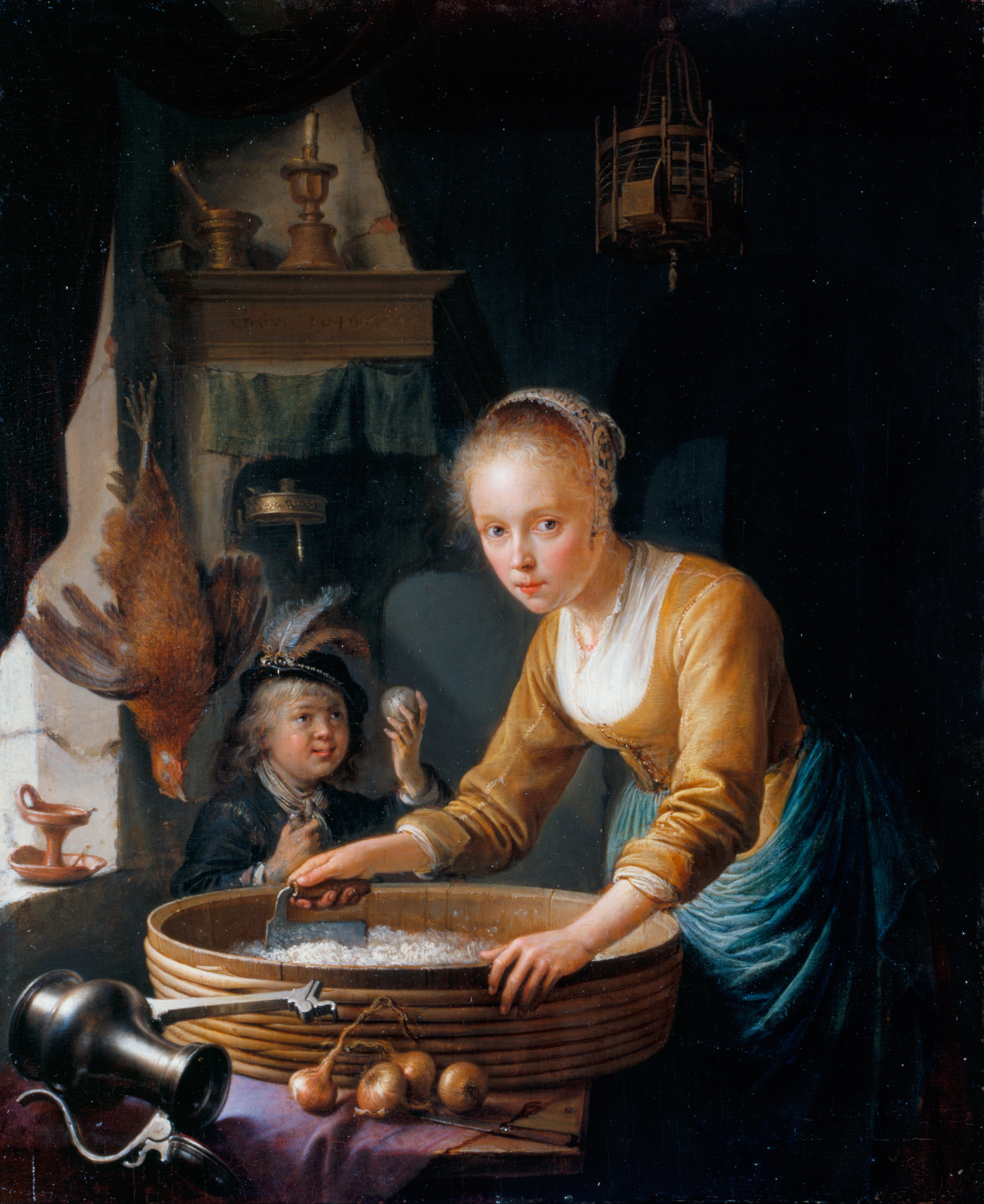
Girl Chopping Onions, 1646

Dou was born in Leiden, where his father was a manufacturer of stained-glass. He studied drawing under Bartholomeus Dolendo, and then trained in the stained-glass workshop of Pieter Couwenhorn. In February 1628, at the age of fourteen, his father sent him to study painting in the studio of Rembrandt (then aged about 21) who lived nearby. From Rembrandt, with whom he remained for about three years, he acquired his skill in colouring and in the more subtle effects of chiaroscuro, and his master's style is reflected in several of his earlier pictures, notably a self-portrait at the age of 22, around 1635–1638, in the Bridgewater Collection, and in the Blind Tobit going to meet his Son, at Wardour Castle [locations may be outdated].

At a comparatively early point in his career, however, he developed a distinctive manner of his own which diverged considerably from Rembrandt's, cultivating a minute and elaborate style of treatment. He is said to have spent five days in painting a hand, and his work was so fine that he found it necessary to manufacture his own brushes.

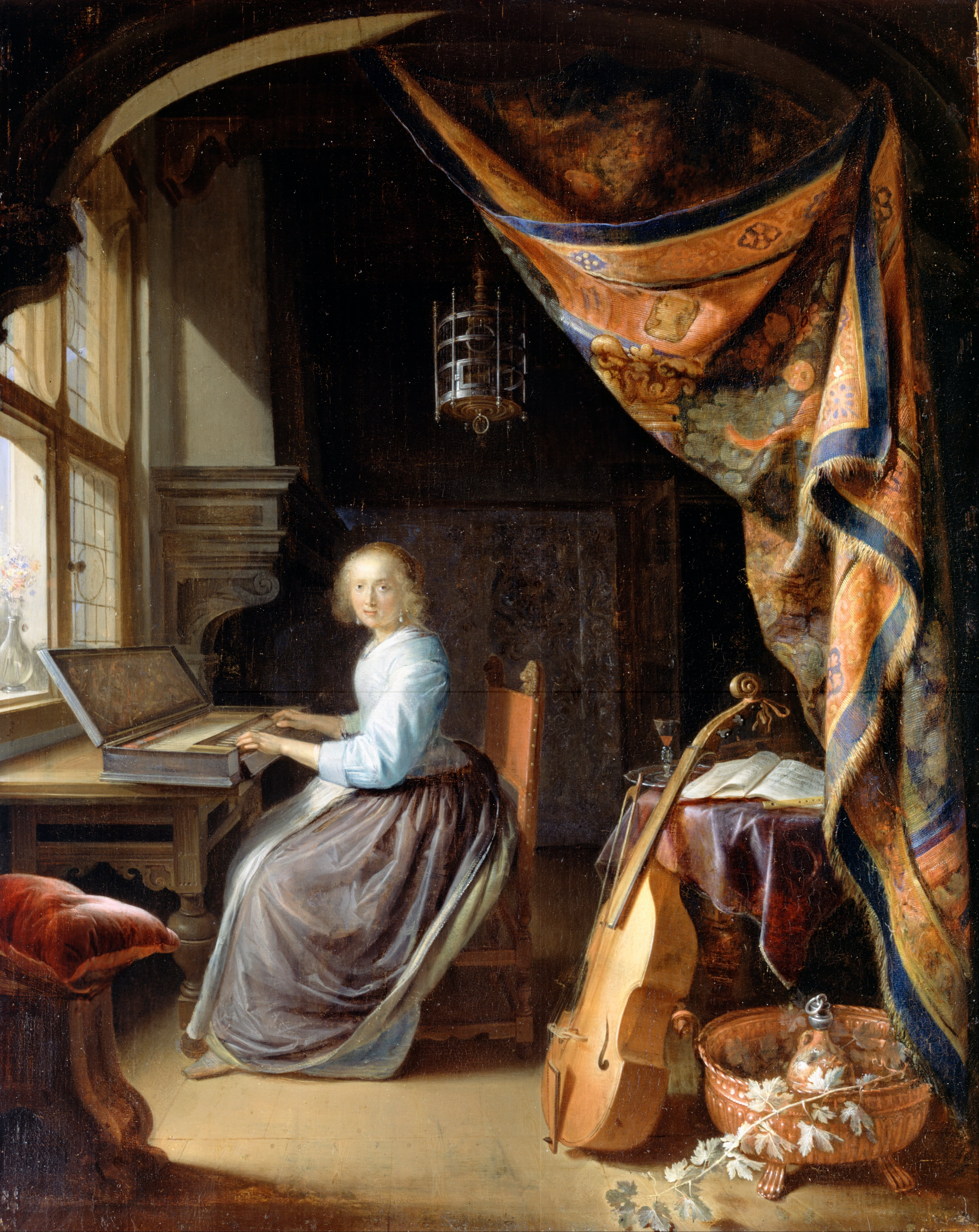
A Woman Playing a Clavichord, c. 1665

Notwithstanding the minuteness of his touch, the general effect was harmonious and free from stiffness, and his colour was always fresh and transparent. He often represented subjects in lantern or candle light, the effects of which he reproduced with an unparalleled fidelity and skill. He often painted with the aid of a concave lens combined with a convex mirror (the former sharpening perception, the latter providing a rightway-up image to paint from), and to obtain exactness looked at his subject through a frame crossed with squares of silk thread. His practice as a portrait painter, which was at first considerable, gradually declined, sitters being unwilling to give him the time that he deemed necessary. His pictures were always small in size. More than 200 are attributed to him, and examples are to be found in most of the major public collections of Europe. His chef-d'oeuvre is generally considered to be The Dropsical Woman (1663), and The Dutch Housewife (1650), both in the Louvre. The Evening School, in the Amsterdam Rijksmuseum, is the best example of the candlelight scenes in which he excelled. In the National Gallery, London, favorable specimens are to be seen in the Poulterer's Shop (1672), and a self-portrait (see above). Dou's pictures brought high prices, and one patron, Pieter Spiering, who acted as Swedish Ambassador in The Hague from the mid-1630s, paid him 500 guilders annually simply for the right of first refusal of his latest works. Queen Christina of Sweden owned eleven paintings by Dou, and Cosimo III de' Medici visited his house, where he may have bought at least one of the works now in the Uffizi. The Dutch royal court itself, however, preferred work of a more classical tendency.

Dou died in Leiden. His most noted pupils were Frans van Mieris the Elder and Gabriël Metsu. He also taught Bartholomeus Maton, Carel de Moor, Matthijs Naiveu, Abraham de Pape, Godfried Schalcken, Pieter Cornelisz van Slingelandt, Domenicus van Tol, Gijsbert Andriesz Verbrugge, and Pieter Hermansz Verelst.

Gerrit Dou's self-portraits

Self-portrait, c. 1631, Brooklyn Museum

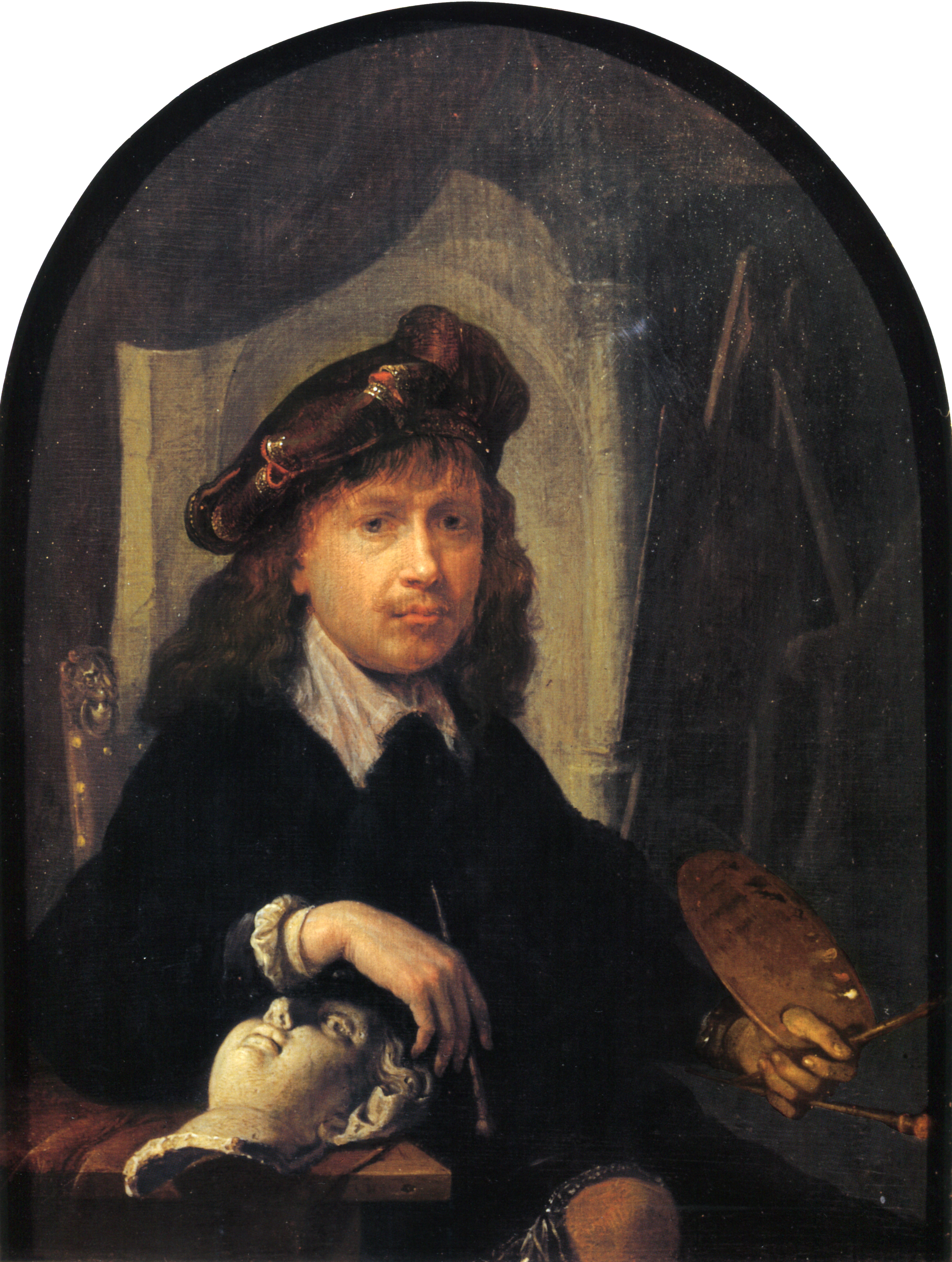
Self-portrait, 1635–1638, Cheltenham Art Gallery and Museum

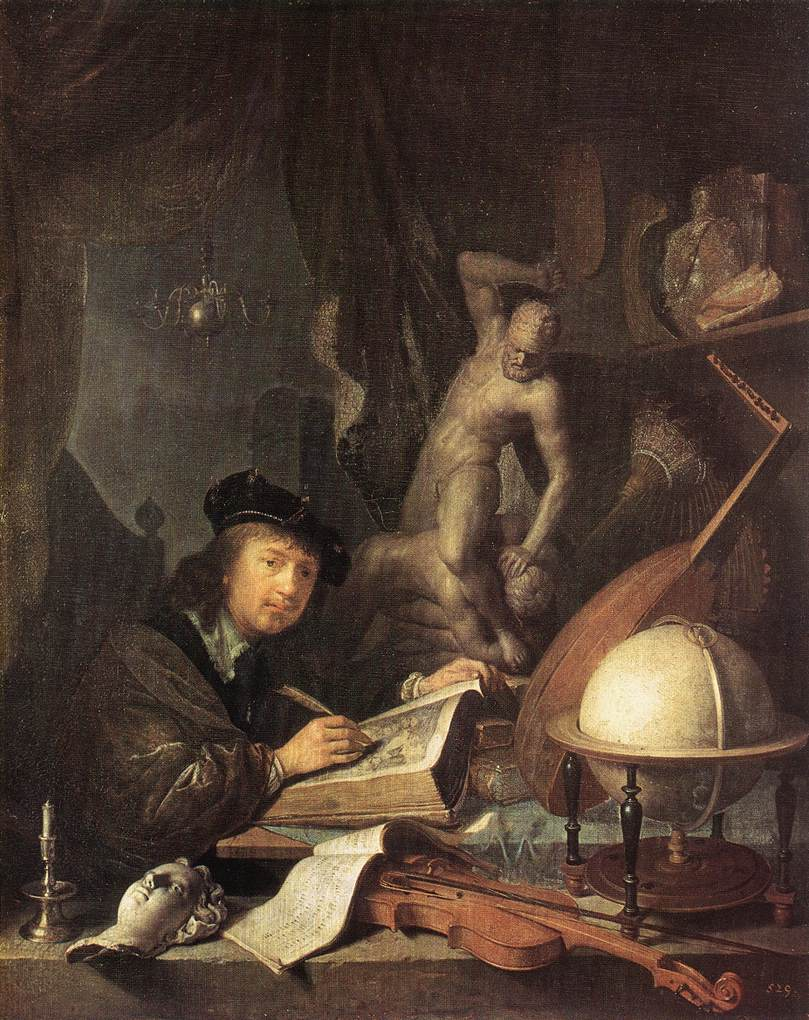
The Painter in his Studio, 1647 Gemäldegalerie Alte Meister

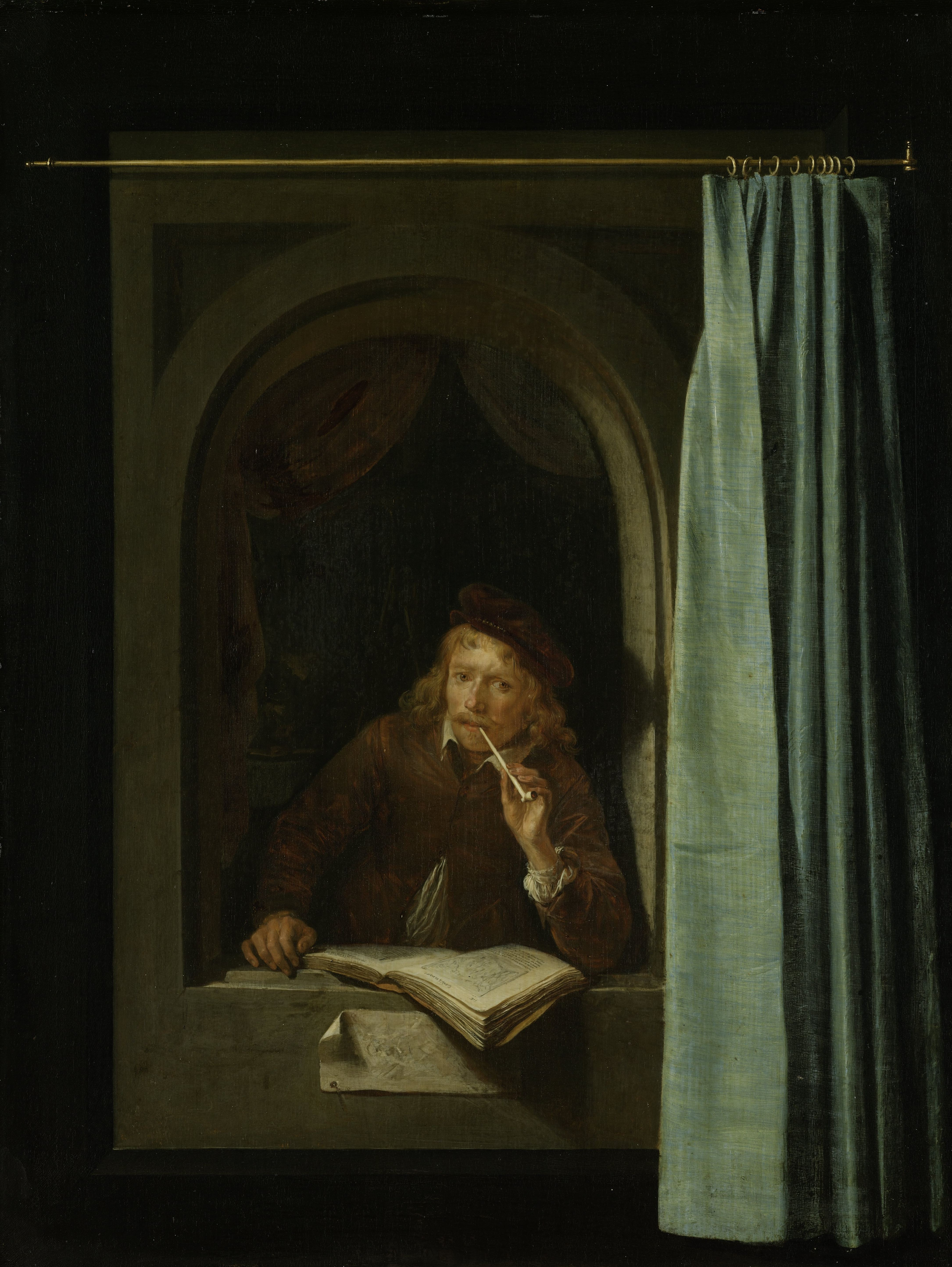
Self-portrait, c. 1650, Rijksmuseum Amsterdam

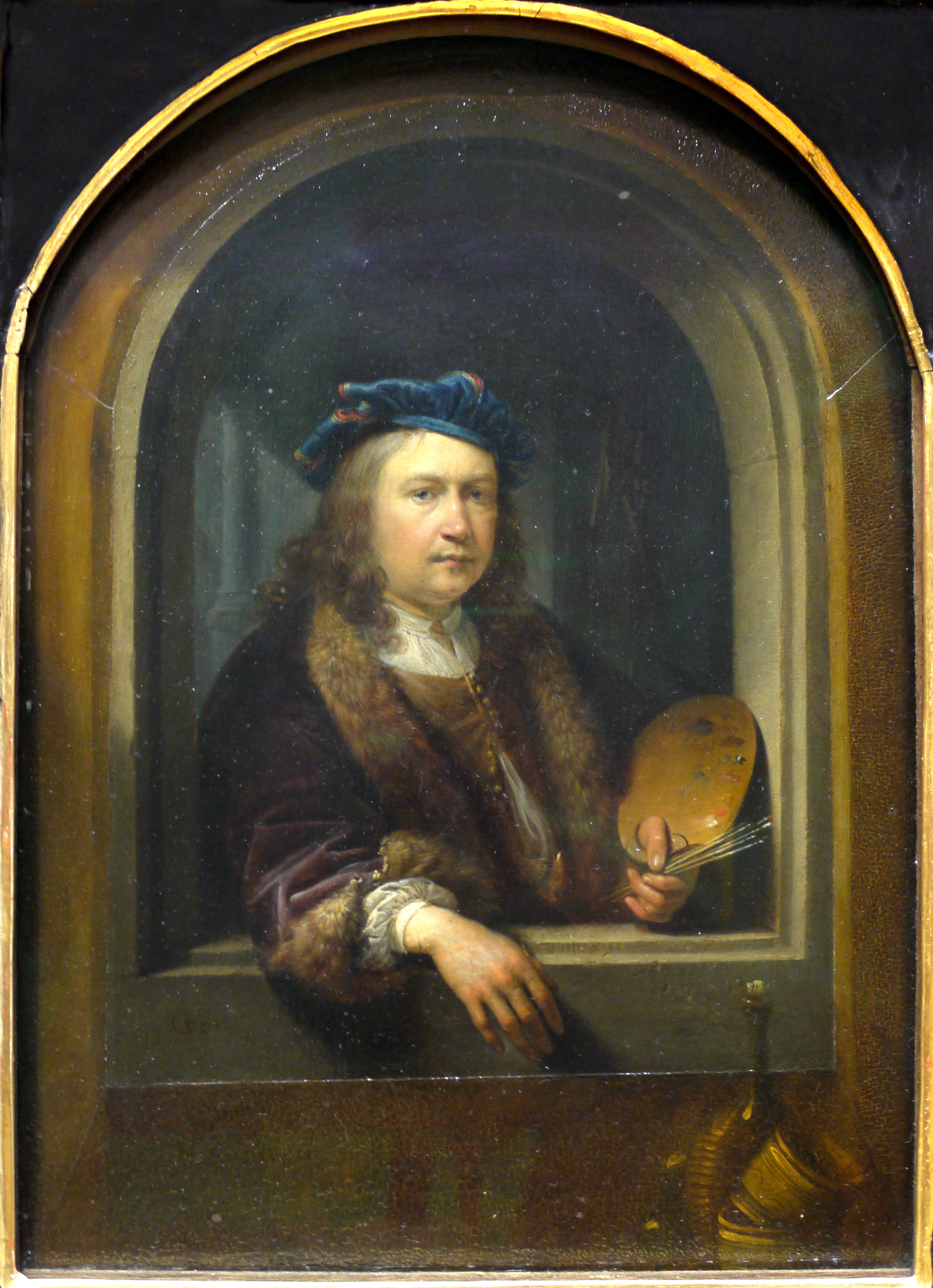
Self-Portrait c. 1665 Louvre

== Interpretation ==
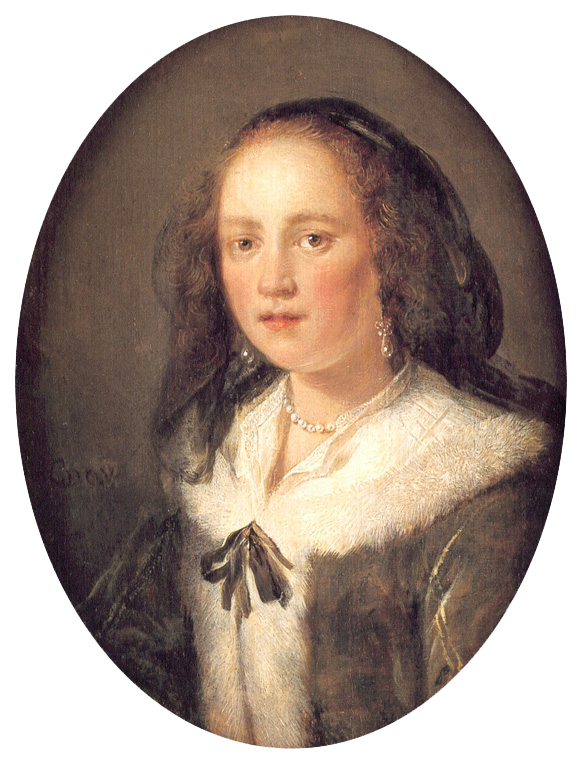
Young Woman in a Black Veil, c. 1660

A considerable amount was written about Dou in his own lifetime; for instance, Philips Angels praises Dou in his Lof der Schilderkunst for his imitation of nature and his visual illusions. Angels also stresses how Dou's paintings expressed the paragone debate current around that time. The debate was an ongoing competition between painting, sculpture and poetry as to which was the best representation of nature. It was especially popular in Leiden where the painters were seeking to obtain the rights of a guild from the town council in order to have laws for their economic protection.

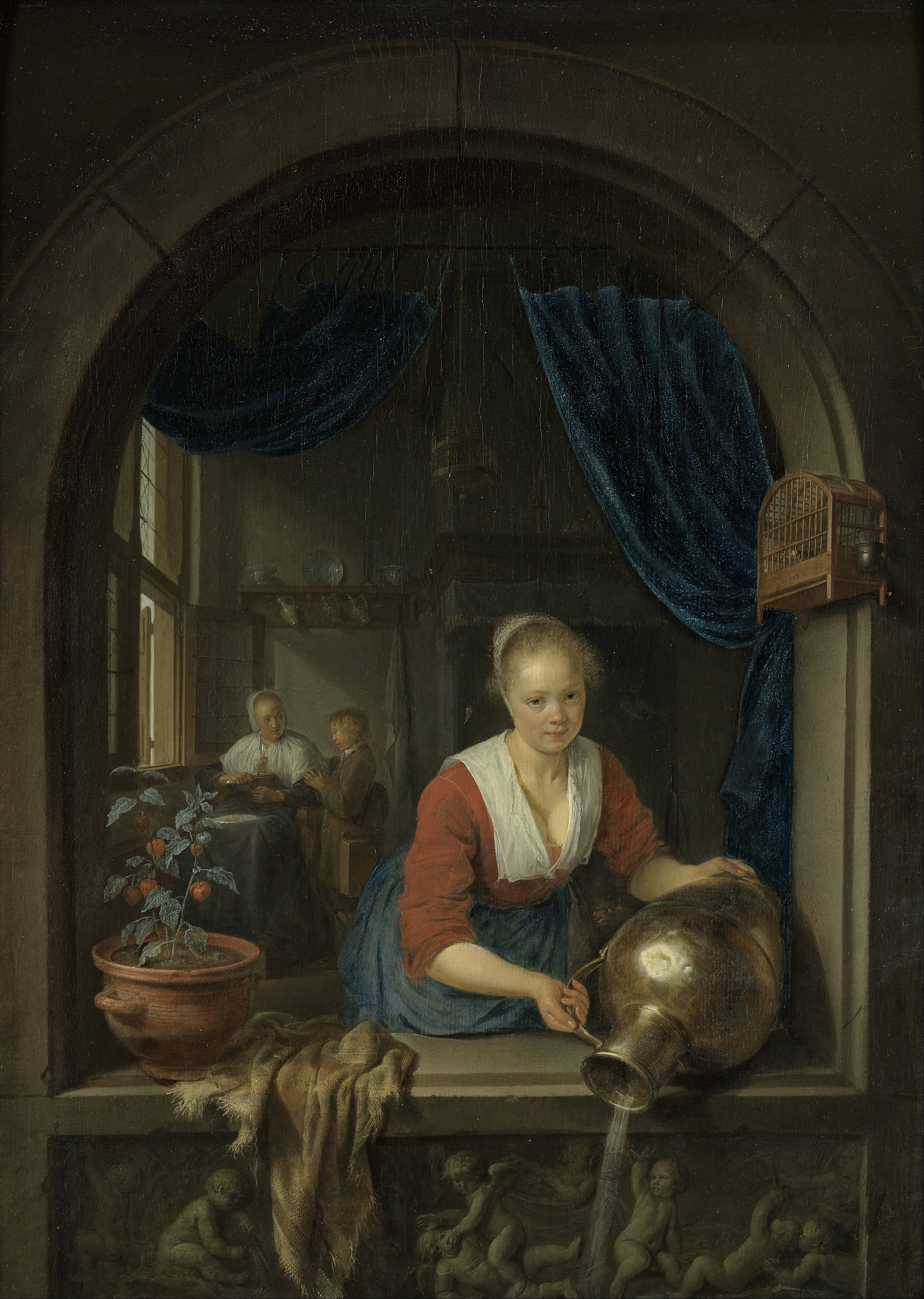
Maid at the Window, c. 1660

The paragone debate is not only addressed in writings from that time but is also reflected in the subject matter of several of Dou's paintings. An example of this is the Old Painter at work, in which an old painter is shown working on a canvas behind a table displaying objects that show his capabilities of imitation. The aged painter refers to an argument in the paragone debate that a painter can achieve his best work at an old age, while a sculptor cannot because of the physical demands of sculpting. On the table, a sculptured head and a printed book are rendered in a lifelike fashion to show that painting can imitate both sculpture and printed paper, thereby reinforcing the notion that painting trumps sculpture. According to Sluijter, the "amazing true-to-life peacock and a beautiful Triton shell, next to a copper pot with the most refined reflections of light" show that art beats nature. Sluijter argues that the peacock stands for the ability of painting to "preserve the transient works of nature thereby even surpassing it". [Sluijter, 2000]

Difficulties arise when an artist wants to associate a certain meaning with a specific object. One of the most troublesome and thus one of the most instructive objects in Dou's oeuvre is a relief by François Duquesnoy called Putti Teasing a Goat. This relief features in many of Dou's pictures with a window-sill motif, and has been assigned various meanings. J. A. Emmens, for example, states that in The Trumpeter the relief represents "the deceitfulness of human desires, because the goat, personifying lust, can time and again be deceived by appearance, by the deceptive imitation, which is the mask". [Emmens, Opstellen, cit. (note 4), vol. 2, p 183 in Hecht, 2002]

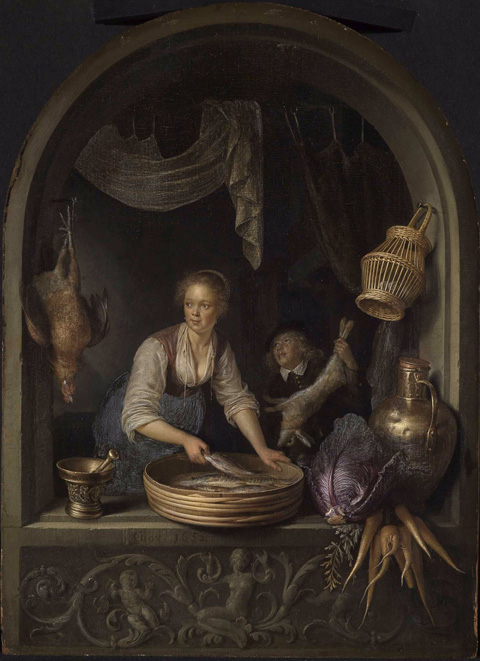
The Kitchen Maid with a Boy in a Window, 1652

The Kitchen Maid with a Boy in a Window features a maidservant, fish and a little boy holding a hare, cramped together with a bunch of vegetables, a dead bird and copperware. Sluijter acknowledges that a contemporary viewer would have certainly approved of this scene as representing an approximation of life since the rendering of all the material is very realistic. On the overall series of maidservant-scenes, Sluijter remarks that the image of a maidservant was generally associated with a sexual undertone. According to de Jongh, this motif has erotic references. In his article on Erotica in 17th-century genre pieces, de Jongh argues that dead hunted birds and animals most likely all refer to the notion of eroticism and availability of the woman depicted because birding and hunting were synonyms for sexual encounters. All images of maidservants accompanied by dead birds or animals refer to hunting and vogelen (birding), which in Dutch means to copulate. The maidservants are thereby explicitly erotic. Certainly, a cock as a bird refers to a cock as the male sex organ and this can be seen hanging from the wall in Kitchen Maid with a Boy in a Window. [de Jongh, 1968–1969] De Jongh´s erotic interpretations can be disputed regarding the paintings by Gerard Dou because he depicts his dead chicks and furry hares not only with seductive maidservants but also as props in motifs with old servants, or in domestic household scenes, such as The Young Mother (1658).

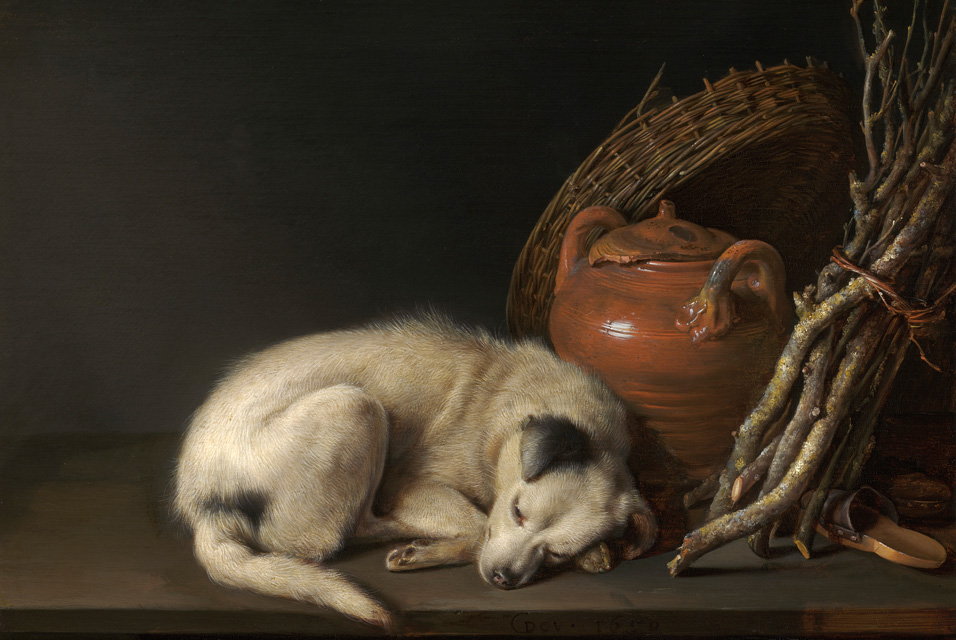
Sleeping Dog, 1650. Oil on panel (van Otterloo Collection, Museum of Fine Arts, Boston)

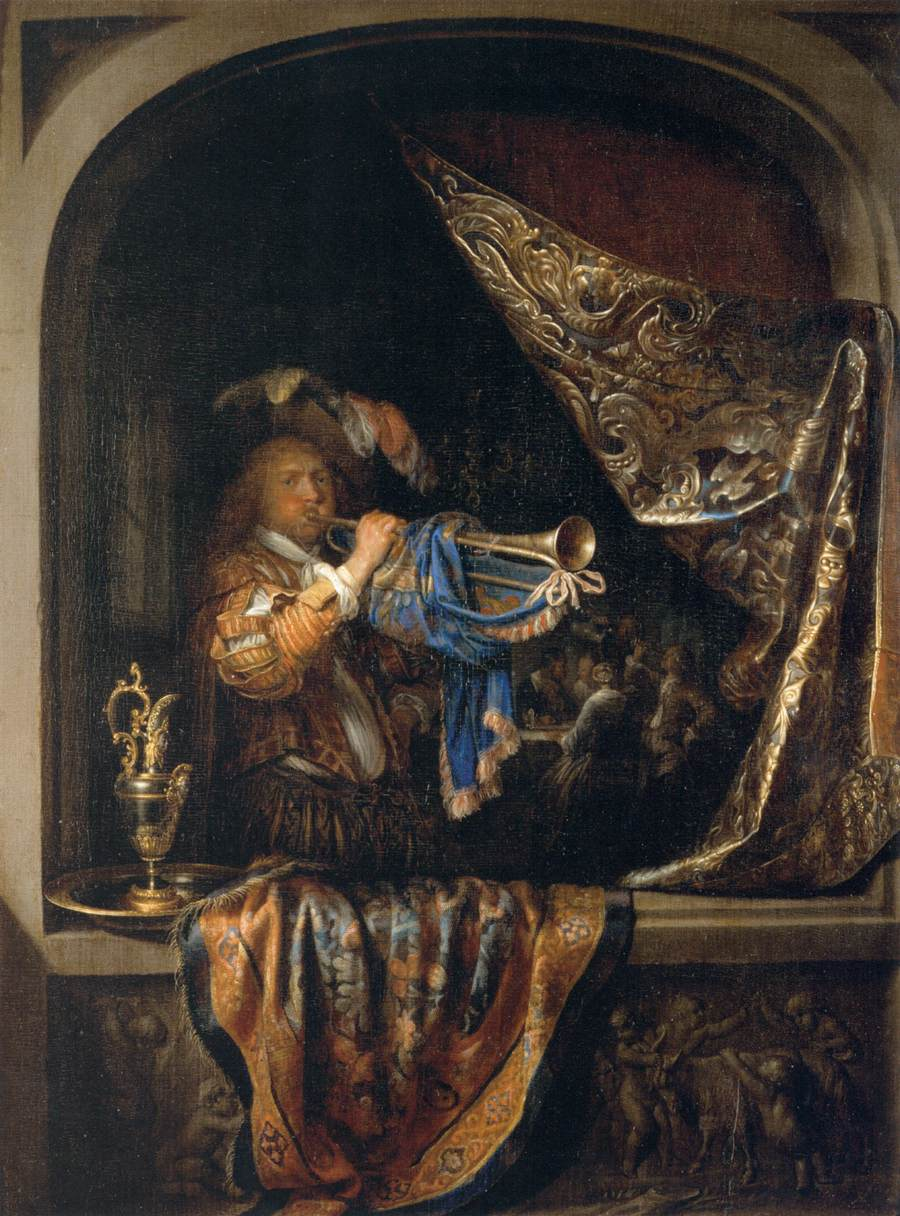
Trumpet-Player in front of a Banquet, 1660–1665 (Louvre Palace)

Additionally, to objects possibly having a deeper meaning via emblem books, complete scenes in Dou's oeuvre have been related to scenes depicted in emblem books or prints. The Girl Pouring Water is a variation of the theme Educatio prima bona sit from Boissards Vesuntini emblemata. This emblem depicts the moral that "children absorb knowledge like a pot absorbs water". The gaining of knowledge is represented by a little boy standing in the background while the water is poured in the foreground. [Hollander, 2002]

One painting that is strongly associated with an emblem is the Night School. This particular painting is rather anecdotal in character. Baer disagrees with Hecht who refers to this painting as being merely a demonstration of Dou's abilities to work with artificial light. Baer identifies the candle lights with the light of understanding, and she relates the unlit lantern on the left wall with ignorance, which is combated by teaching, represented by the lit lantern in the middle of the floor. Additionally, Baer suggests that the girl at the left is a representation of Cognitione because she strikes the same pose as in Cesare Ripa's Iconologia. Like Ripa's emblem, the girl in Dou's painting holds a candle while pointing towards a line of text. The essence of Ripa's emblem is that "like our eyes, which need light to see, so our reason needs our senses, especially that of sight, to achieve true understanding". [Baer, 2001]

== Posthumous reputation ==
Dou's work commanded high prices long after his death, until the 1860s. Soon after, he fell into near complete obscurity. For example, when the Metropolitan Museum of Art in New York held in an exhibit to introduce Dutch art, it featured 37 by Rembrandt, 20 by Hals, but none by Dou. His obscurity continued until the 1970s when his reputation was reestablished and has continued since.

== Works ==
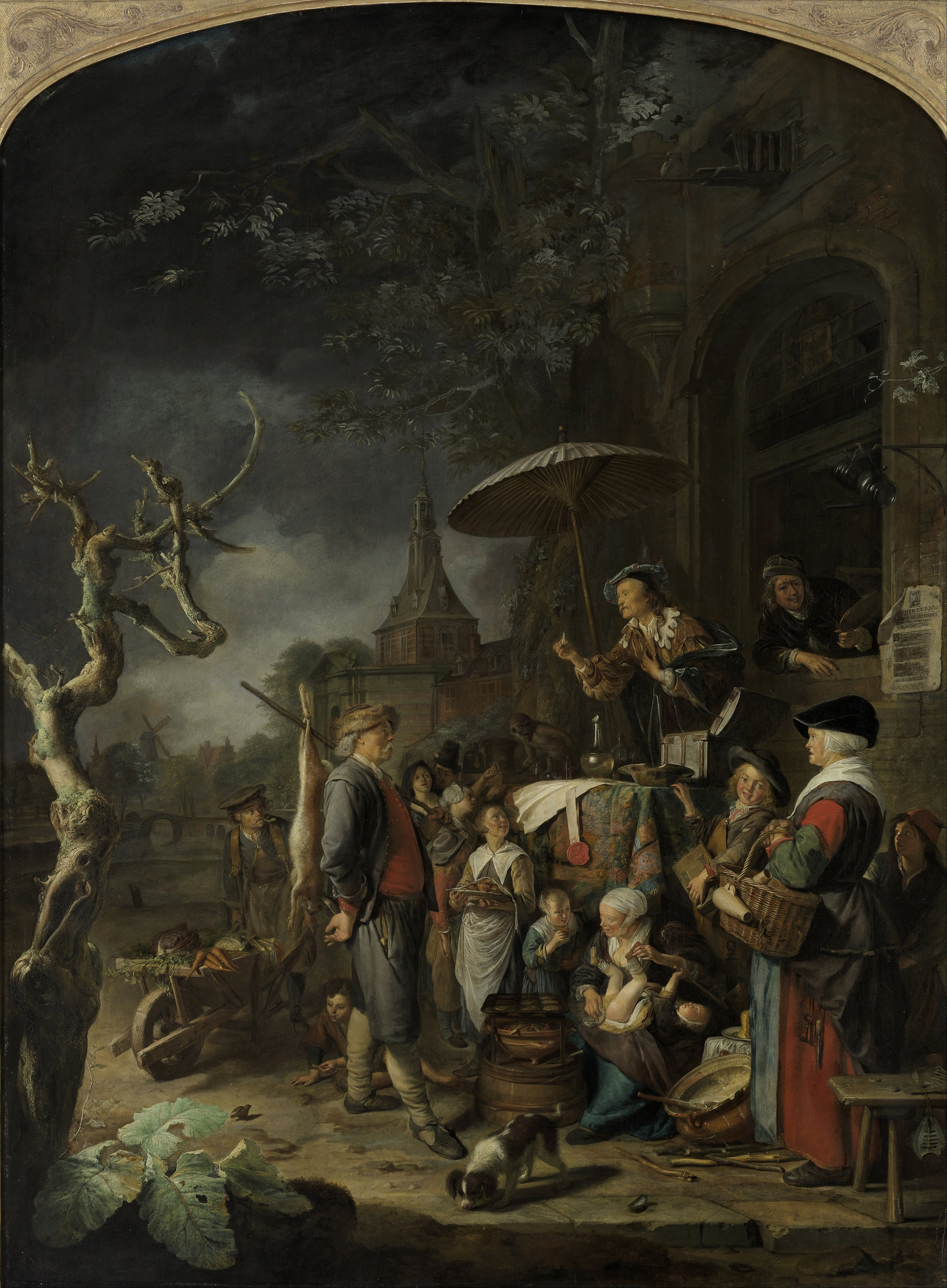
The Quack Doctor, 1652, Oil on panel, 112 x 83 cm, Museum Boijmans Van Beuningen, Rotterdam

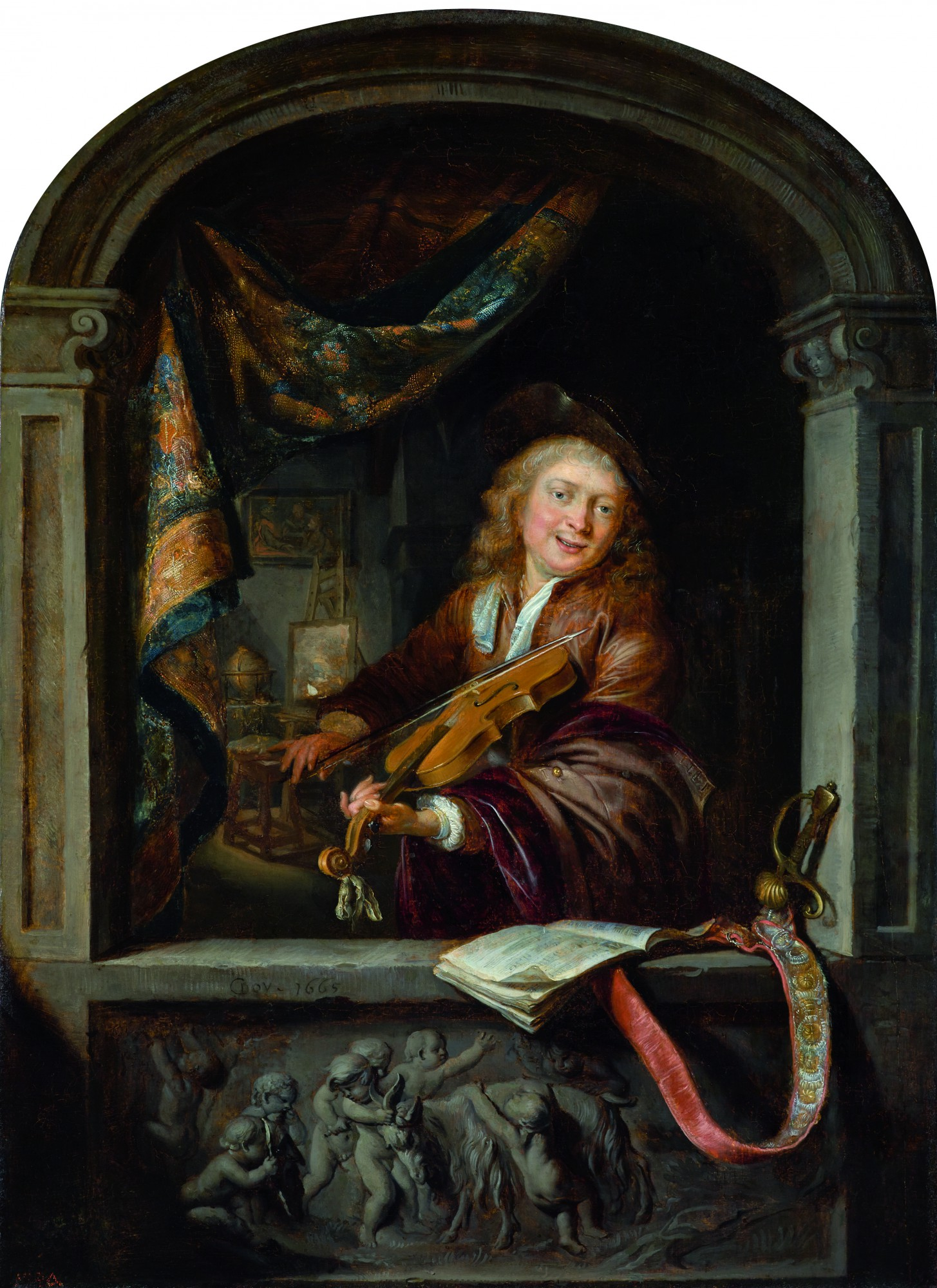
Violinist, 1665, Palace on the Water in Warsaw.

- The Night School (Rijksmuseum, Amsterdam)
- 1628: Astronomer (Hermitage Museum, Saint Petersburg)
- 1631.1632 Old Woman Reading (formerly known as Rembrandt's Mother) (Rijksmuseum, Amsterdam)
- 1630s: Portrait of a Girl (Manchester Art Gallery, UK)
- 1631: Prince Rupert (J. Paul Getty Museum, Los Angeles)
- 1635–1636: Still Life with a Boy Blowing Soap-Bubbles (National Museum of Western Art, Tokyo)
- 1635–1640: Portrait of a Man (National Gallery, London)
- 1637: An Interior with a Young Violinist (National Galleries of Scotland)
- 1640s: Portrait of a Young Woman (National Gallery, London)
- 1640–1645: Portrait of a Man (Hermitage Museum, Saint Petersburg)
- 1642–1647: St. Jerome in the Desert (Memorial Art Gallery of the University of Rochester, New York)
- 1645: The Schoolmaster (Fitzwilliam Museum, Cambridge)
- 1646: Girl Chopping Onions (Royal Collection, London)
- 1647: Still Life With Book and Purse (J. Paul Getty Museum, Los Angeles)
- 1650: The Dutch Housewife (Louvre, Paris)
- 1650s: The Young Mother (Gemäldegalerie, Berlin)
- 1650s: Self Portrait (Rijksmuseum, Amsterdam)
- 1650s: Self-portrait at the Window (Residenzgalerie, Salzburg)
- 1658-1665: Young Woman with a Lighted Candle at a Window (Thyssen-Bornemisza Museum, Madrid)
- 1652: The Quack Doctor (Museum Boymans-van Beuningen, Rotterdam)
- 1653:The Physician (Christchurch Art Gallery Te Puna o Waiwhetu, Christchurch, New Zealand)
- 1653: The Violin Player (Liechtenstein Palace, Vienna)
- 1655: Old Woman Cutting Bread (Museum of Fine Arts, Boston)
- 1655: Astronomer by Candlelight (J. Paul Getty Museum, Los Angeles)
- 1658: The Young Mother (Mauritshuis, The Hague)
- 1660s: The Nursery (Lost with the sinking of the Vrouw Maria in 1771)
- 1660–1665: Dentist by Candlelight (Kimbell Art Museum, Fort Worth)
- 1660–1665: Old Woman Unreeling Threads (Hermitage Museum, Saint Petersburg)
- 1660–1665: Soldier Bather (Hermitage Museum, Saint Petersburg)
- 1660-1665: Woman Bather (Hermitage Museum, Saint Petersburg)
- 1660-1665: Self-portrait (Louvre, Paris)
- 1661: A Hermit (Wallace Collection, London)
- 1663: The Dropsical Woman (Louvre, Paris)
- 1663: Woman at a Window with a Copper Bowl of Apples and a Cock Pheasant (Fitzwilliam Museum, Cambridge)
- 1665: A Lady playing a Clavichord (Dulwich Picture Gallery, London)
- 1670: A Hermit Praying (Minneapolis Institute of Arts, Minnesota)
- 1670: The Hermit (National Gallery of Art, Washington, D.C.)
- 1670s: A Poulterer's Shop (National Gallery, London)
- 1670–75: The Herring Seller (Hermitage Museum, Saint Petersburg)
- Self Portrait (National Gallery, London)
- Portrait of a Young Man (Fitzwilliam Museum, Cambridge)
- Evening Light (Rijksmuseum, Amsterdam)
- Young Man (The Hague)
- The Cook (Louvre, Paris)
- The Spinner (Gala-Salvador Dalí Foundation)
- The Spinning Reel (Fine Arts Museums of San Francisco)
- The Reader (Fine Arts Museums of San Francisco)
- Portrait of an Unknown Gentleman (Museum of Fine Arts at the University of Montana, Missoula)
- Dog at Rest (Museum of Fine Arts, Boston)
Gerrit Dou's works

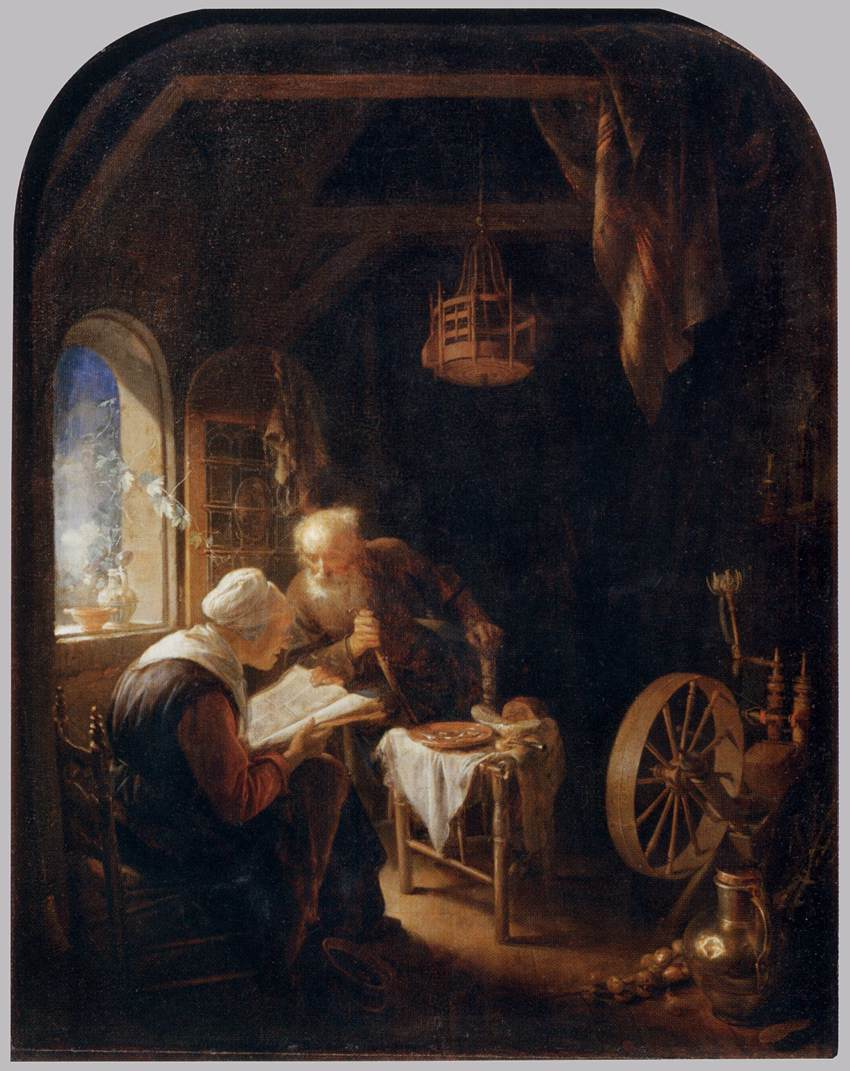
Reading the Bible, c. 1645, Louvre

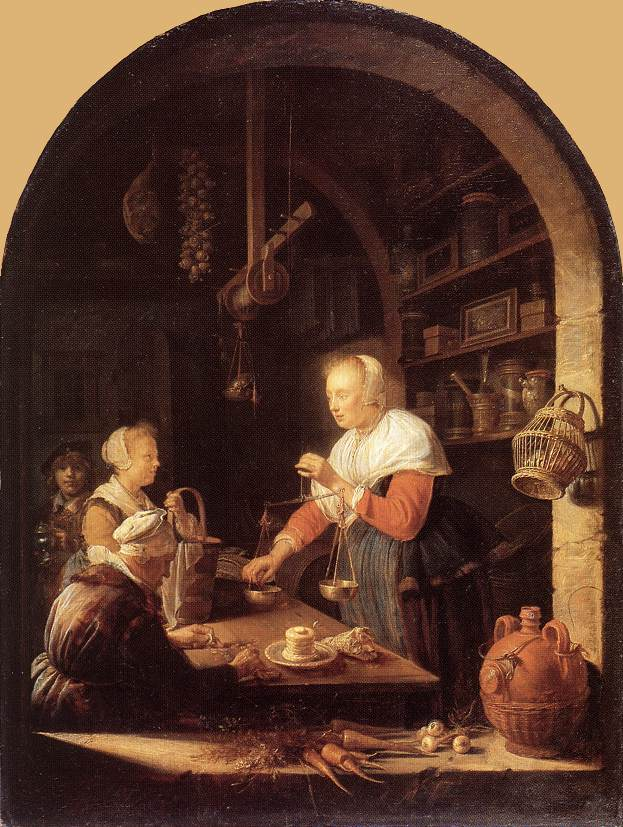
The Grocer's Shop, 1647, Louvre

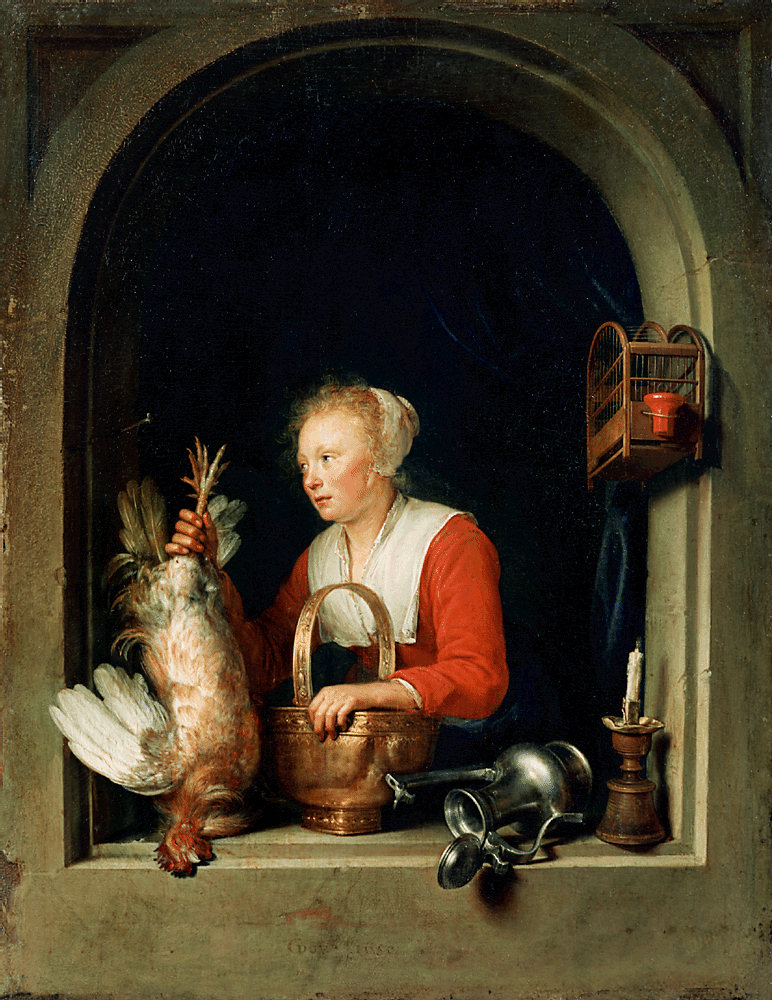
Dutch Housewife, 1650, Louvre

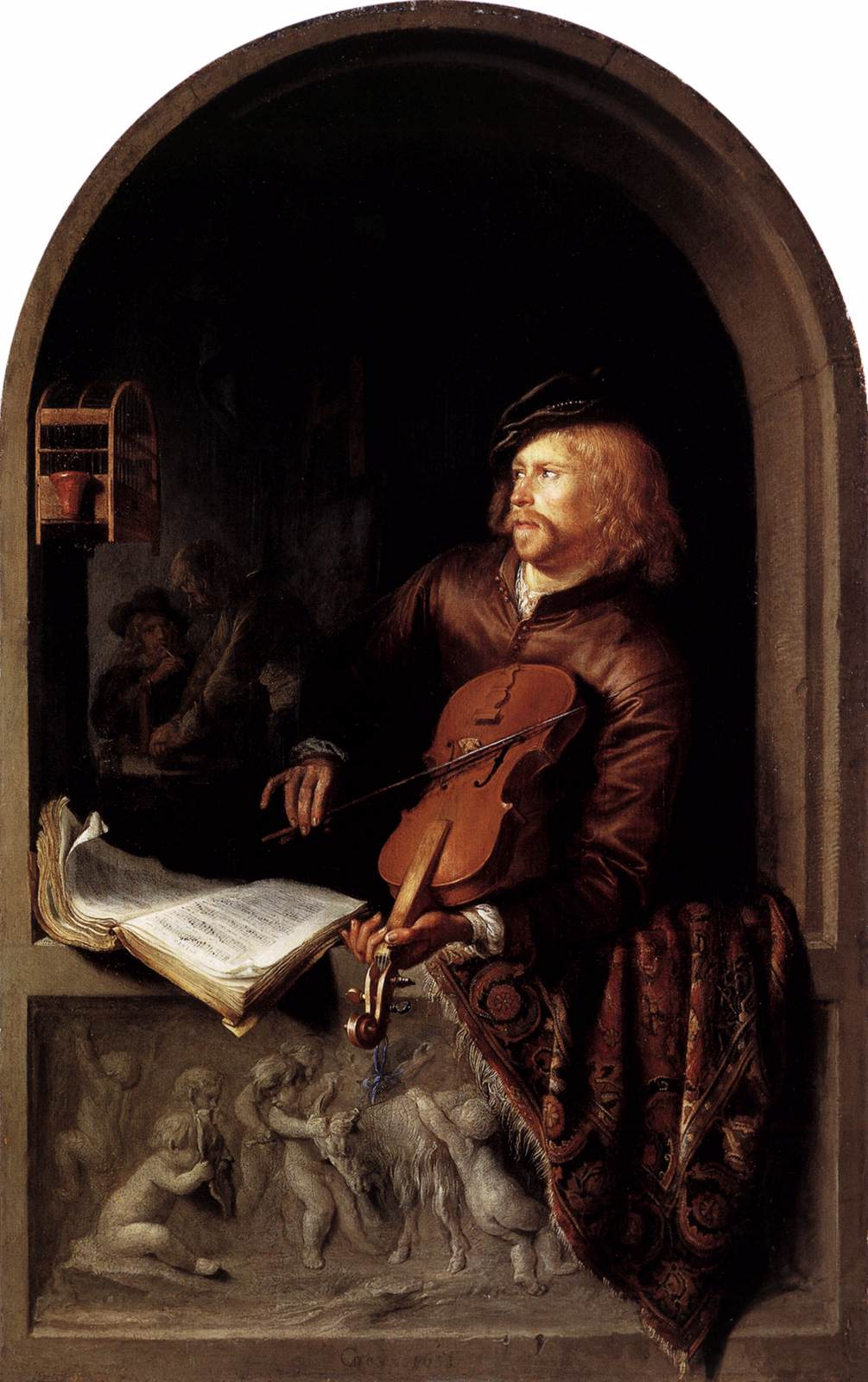
Violon Player, 1653, Liechtenstein Museum

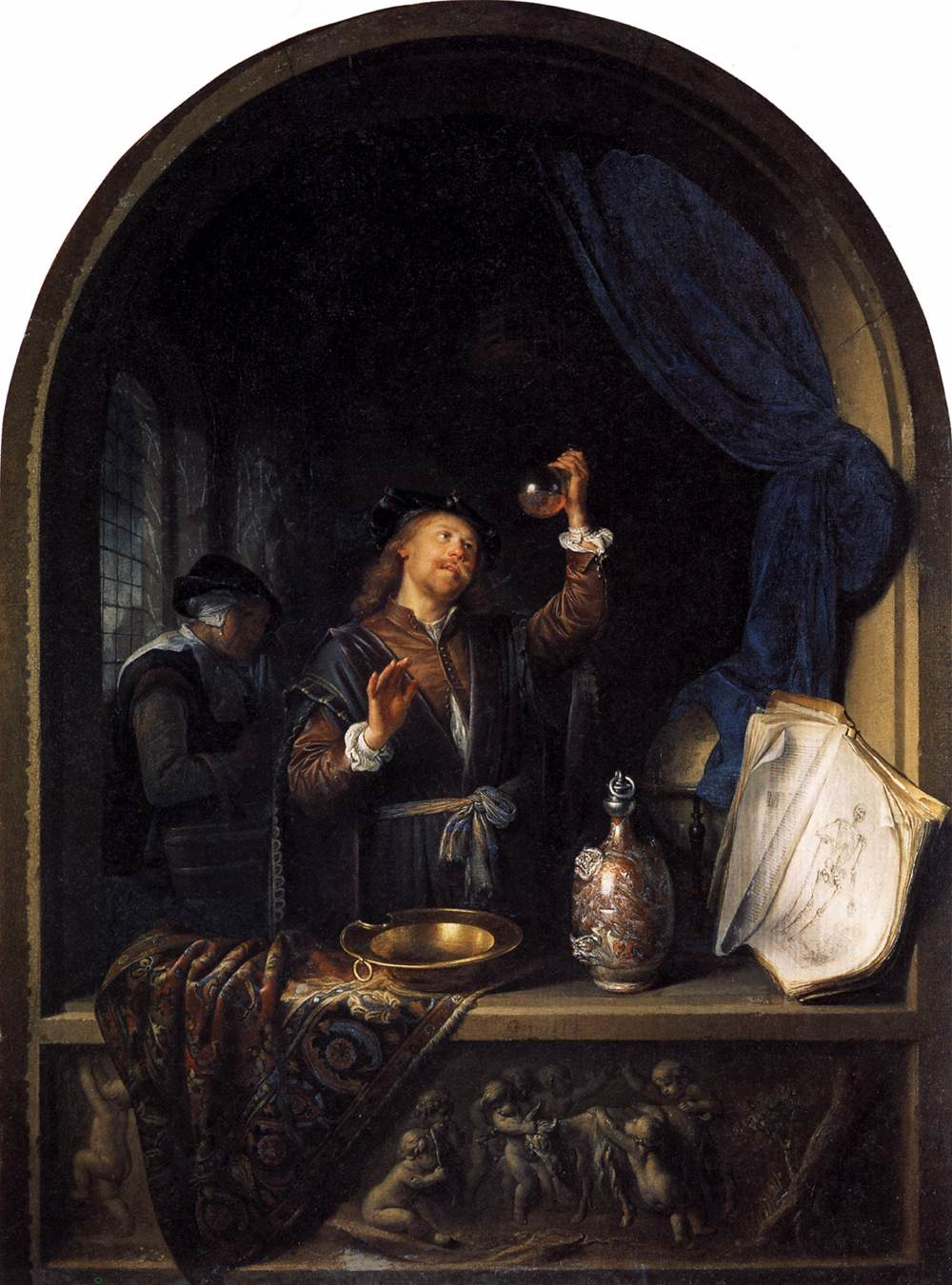
The Physician, 1653, Kunsthistorisches Museum, Vienna

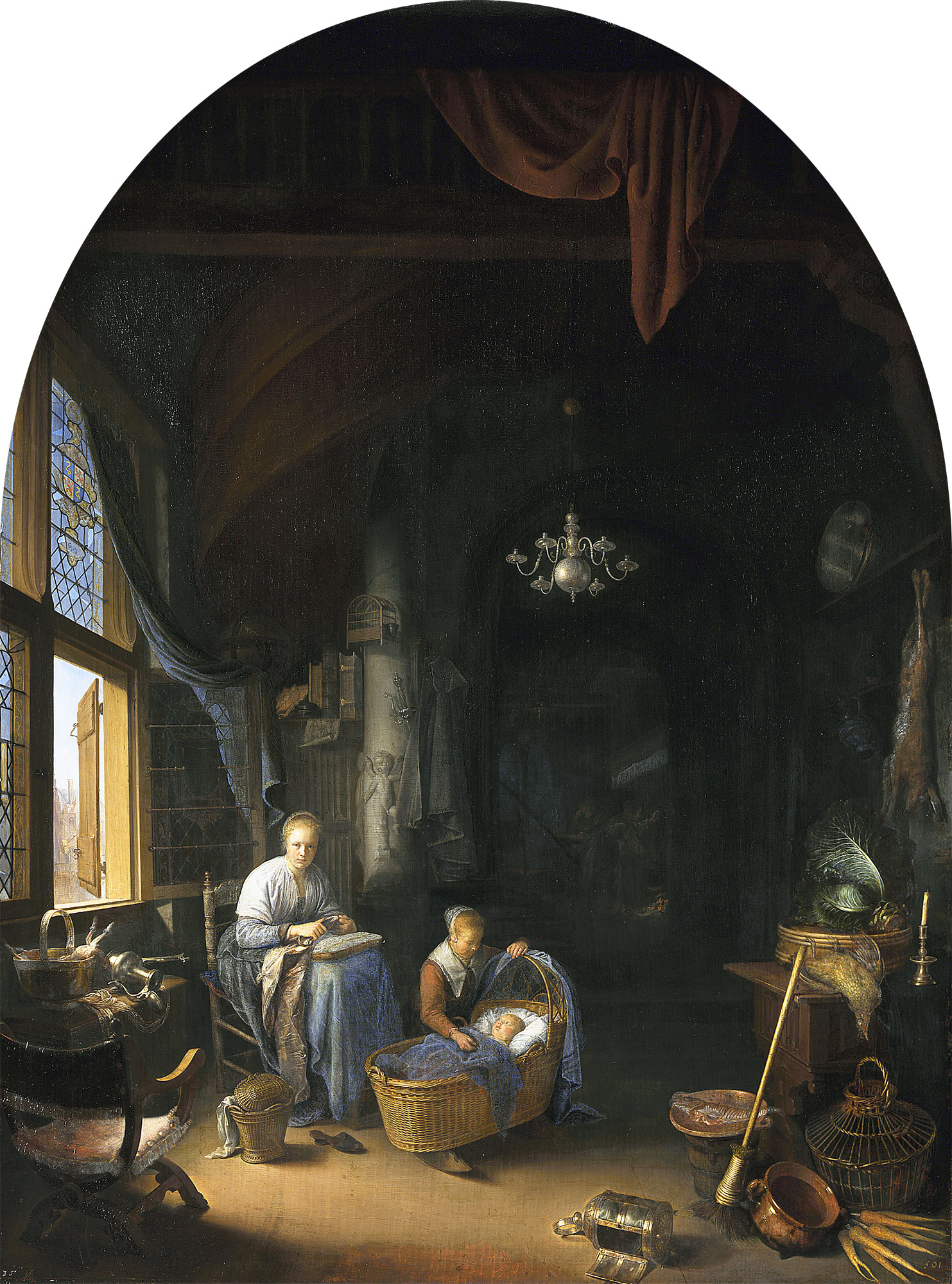
The Young Mother, 1658, Mauritshuis

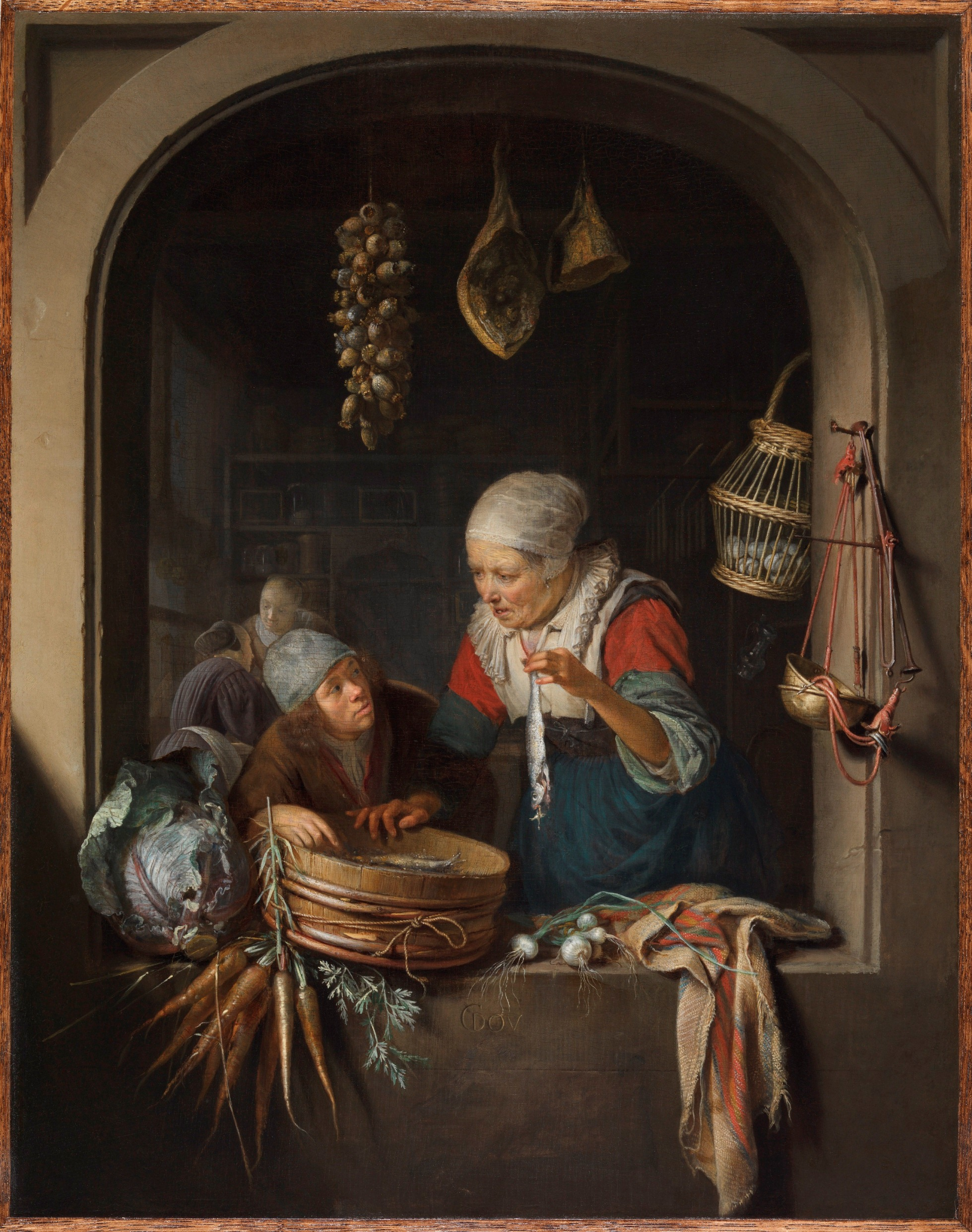
Haringverkoopster met jongen, 1664, Leiden Collection

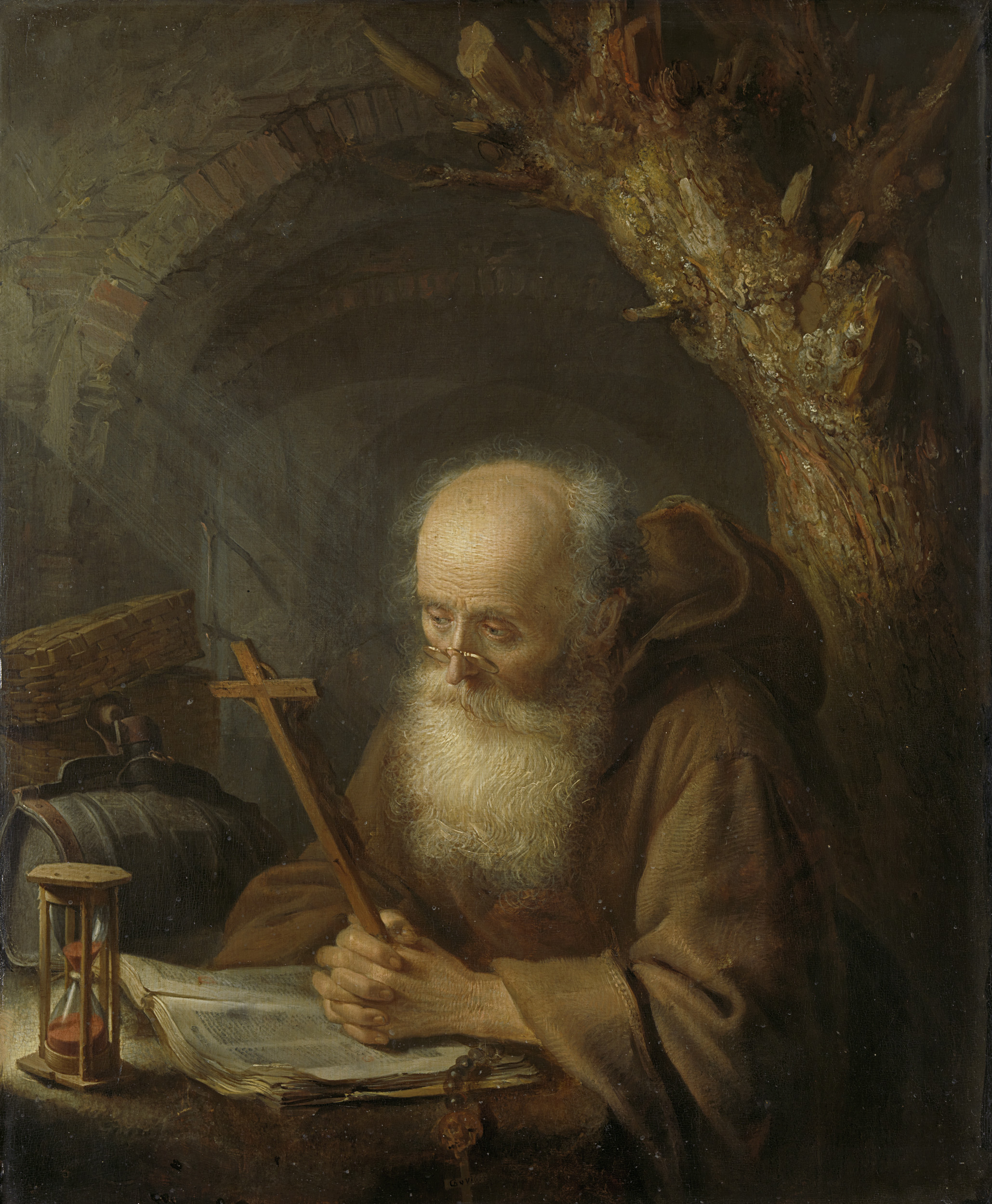
A Hermit, 1664, Rijksmuseum

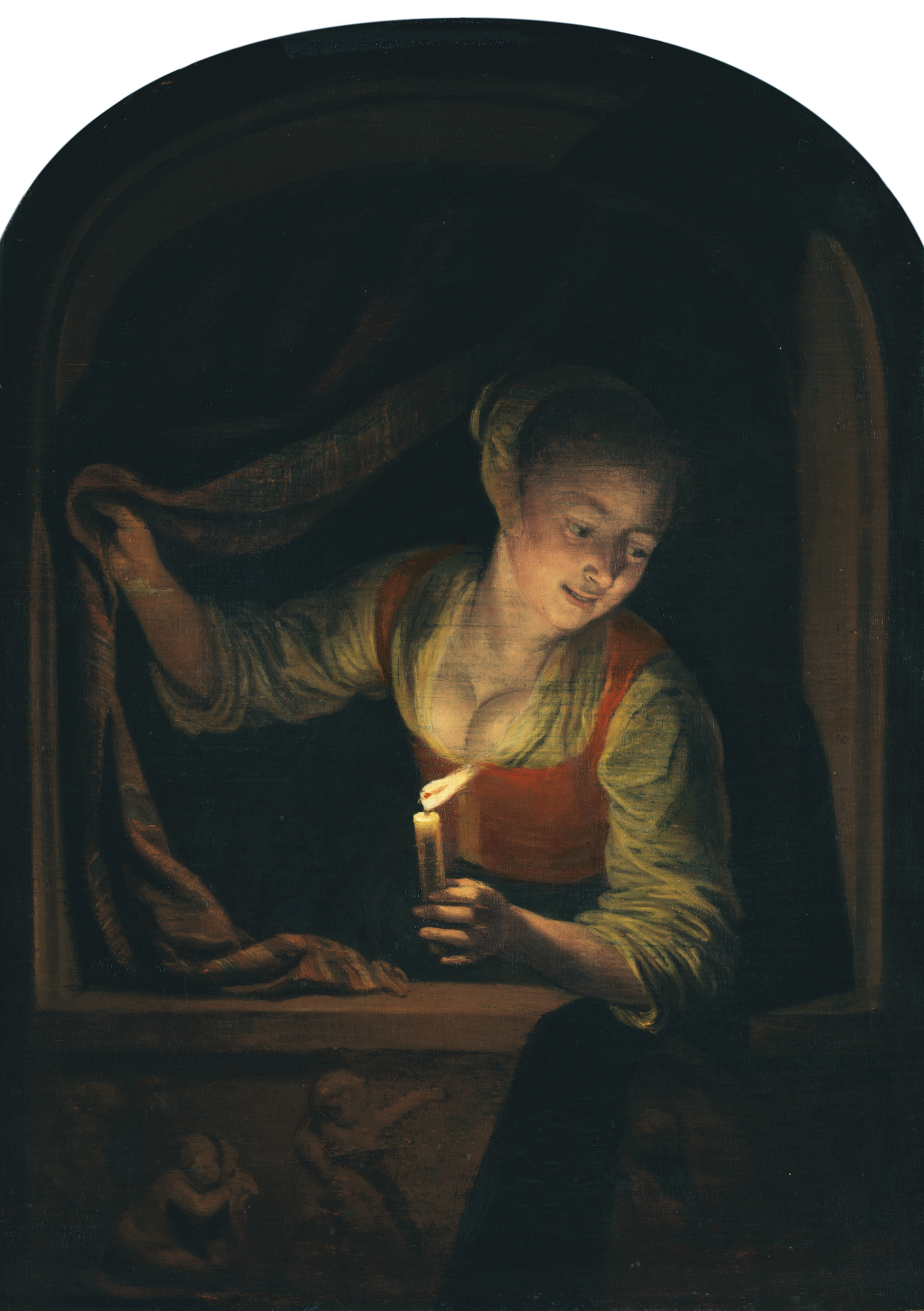
Girl with a Candle at a Window, between 1658 and 1665, Thyssen-Bornemisza Museum, Madrid

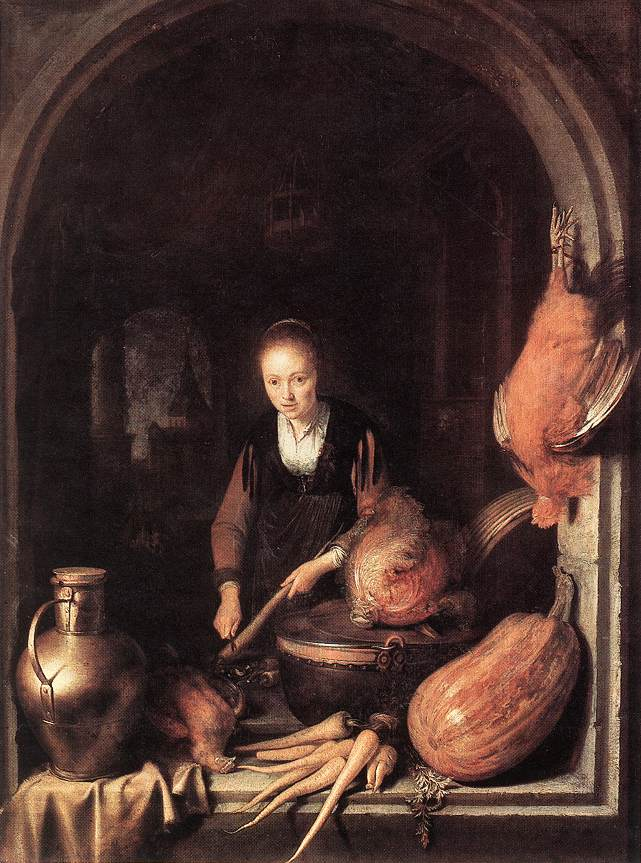
Woman Peeling Carrot

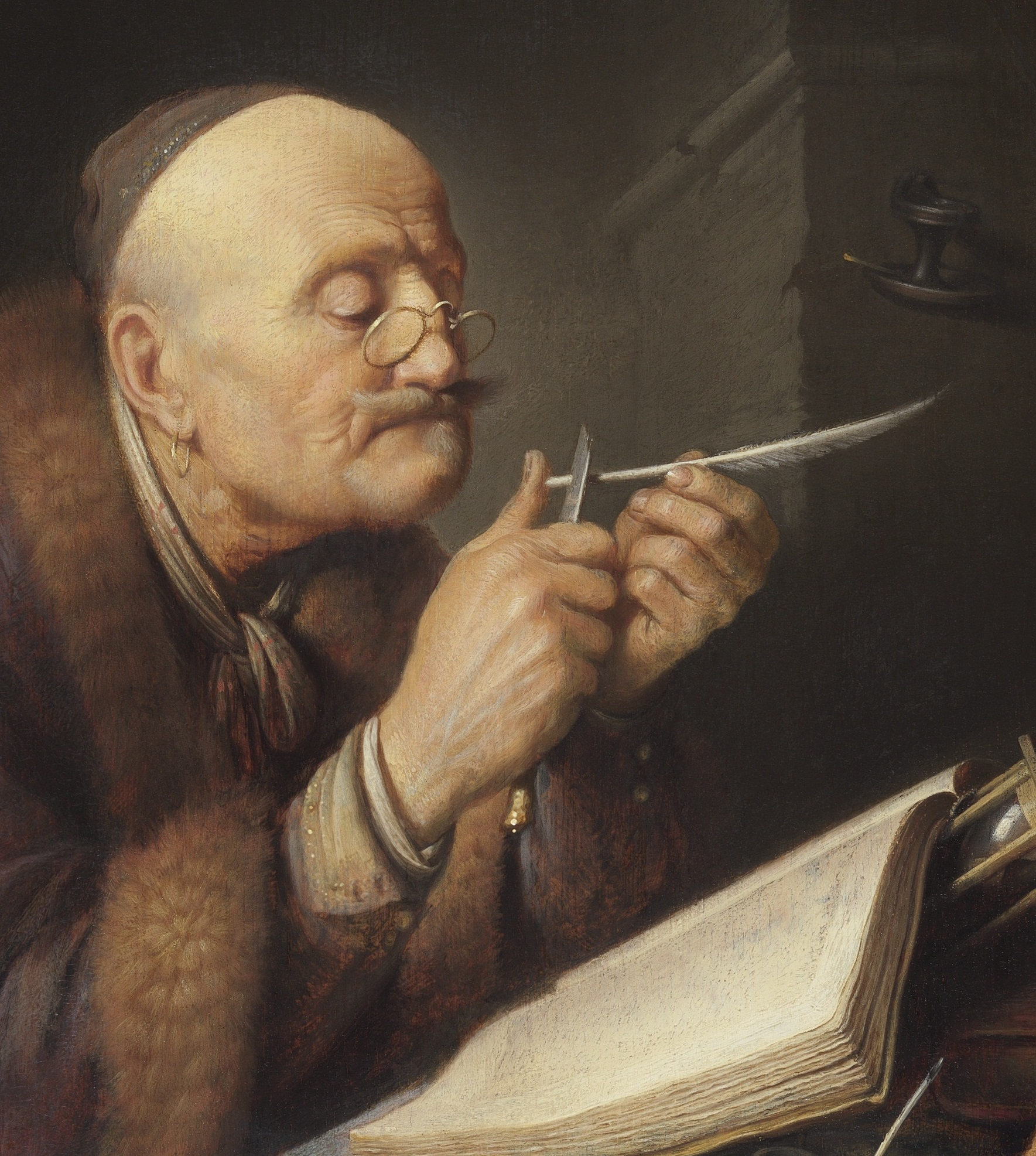
Scholar sharpening a quill pen, 1633, Leiden Collection

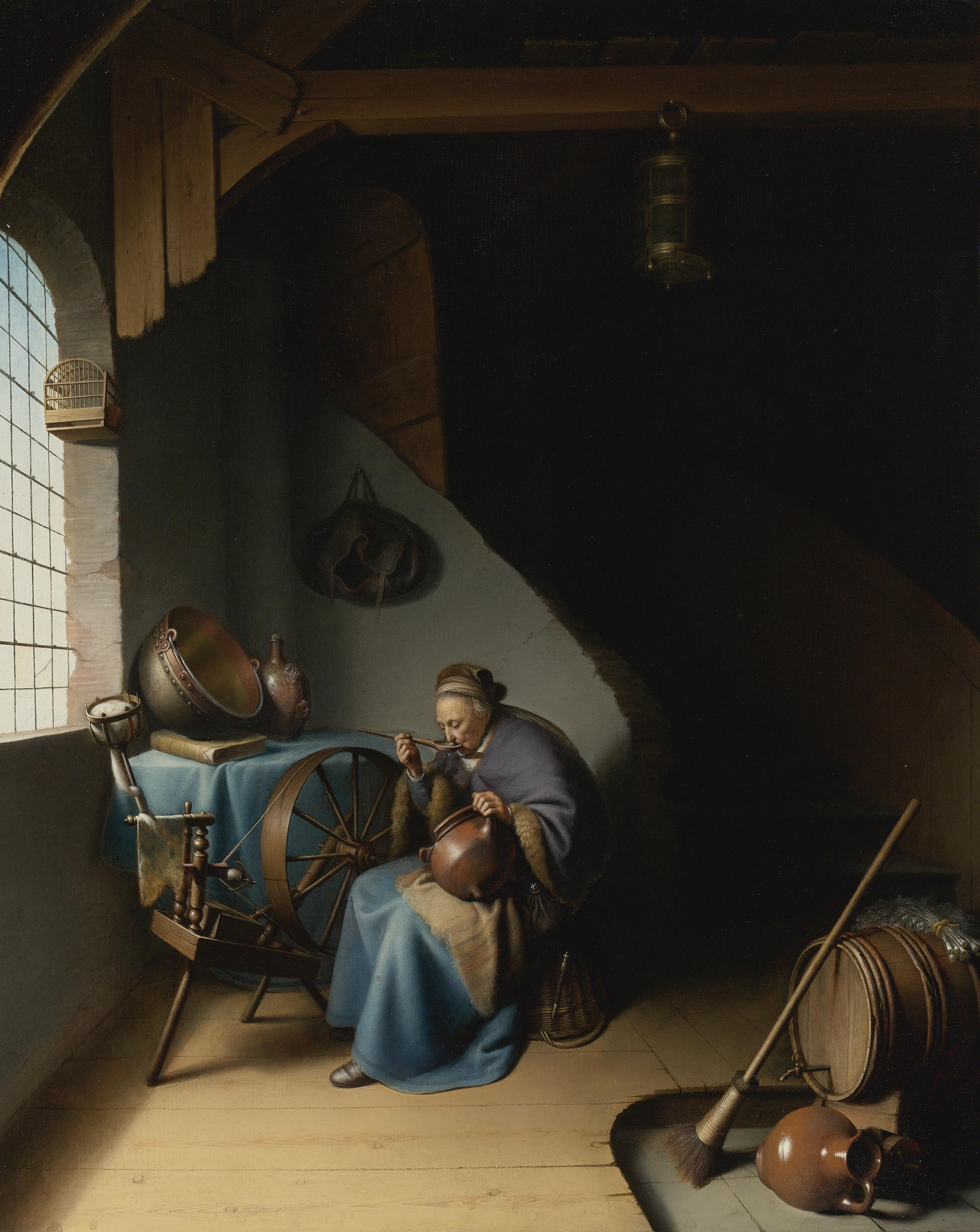
Woman Eating Porridge, c. 1632–1637, Private collection

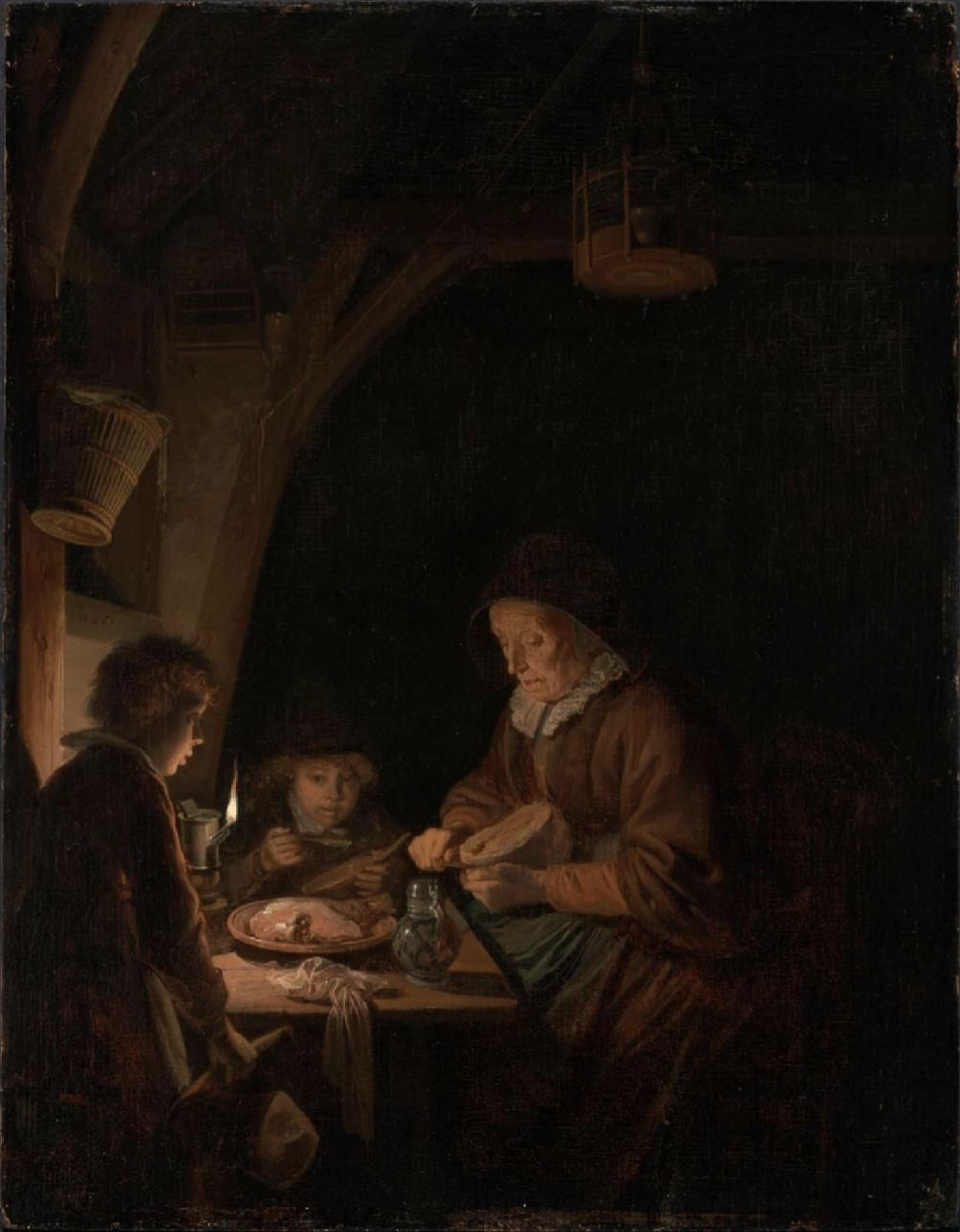
Old Woman Cutting Bread, c. 1655, Museum of Fine Arts, Boston

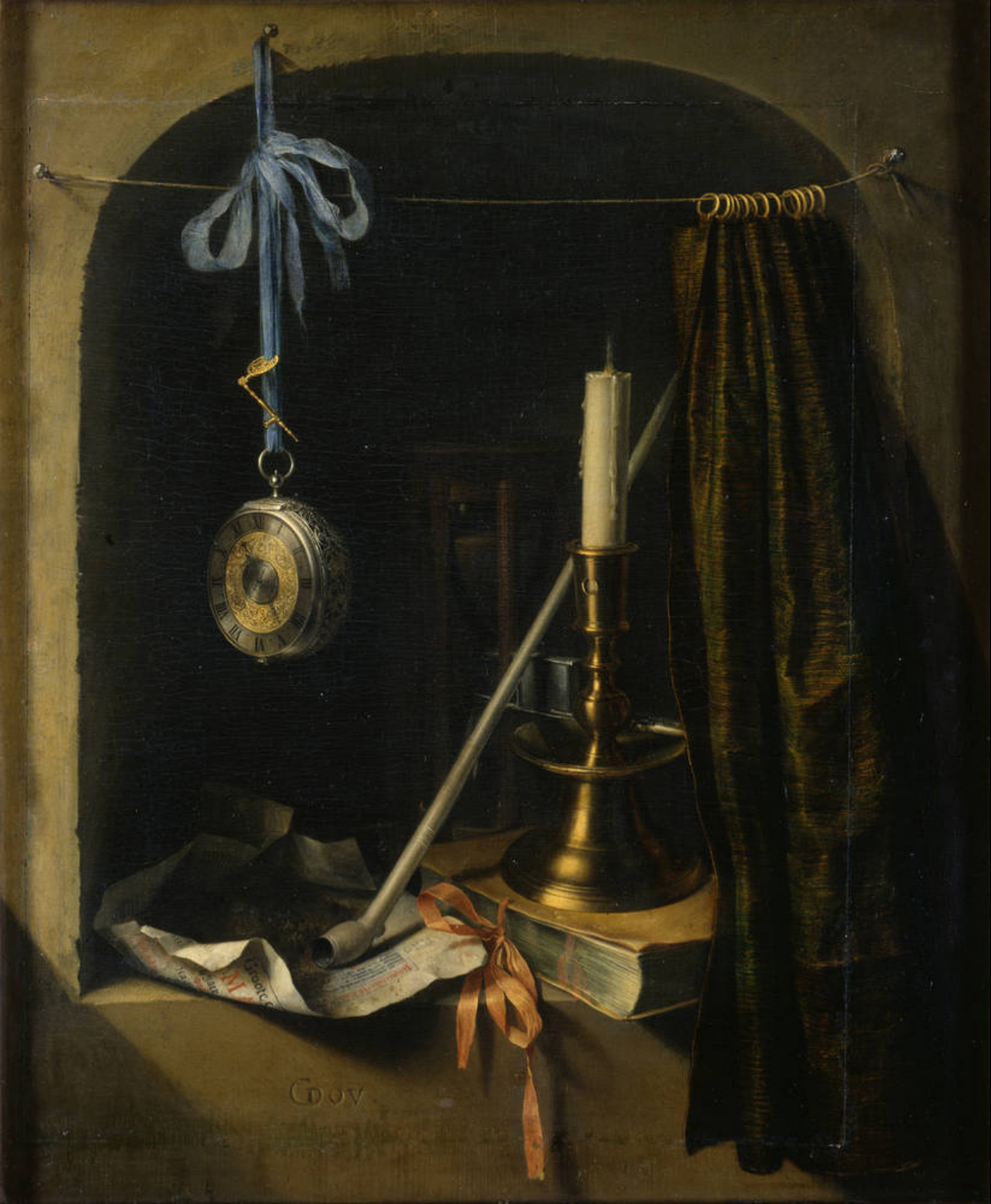
Still life, c. 1660, Staatliche Kunstsammlungen Dresden

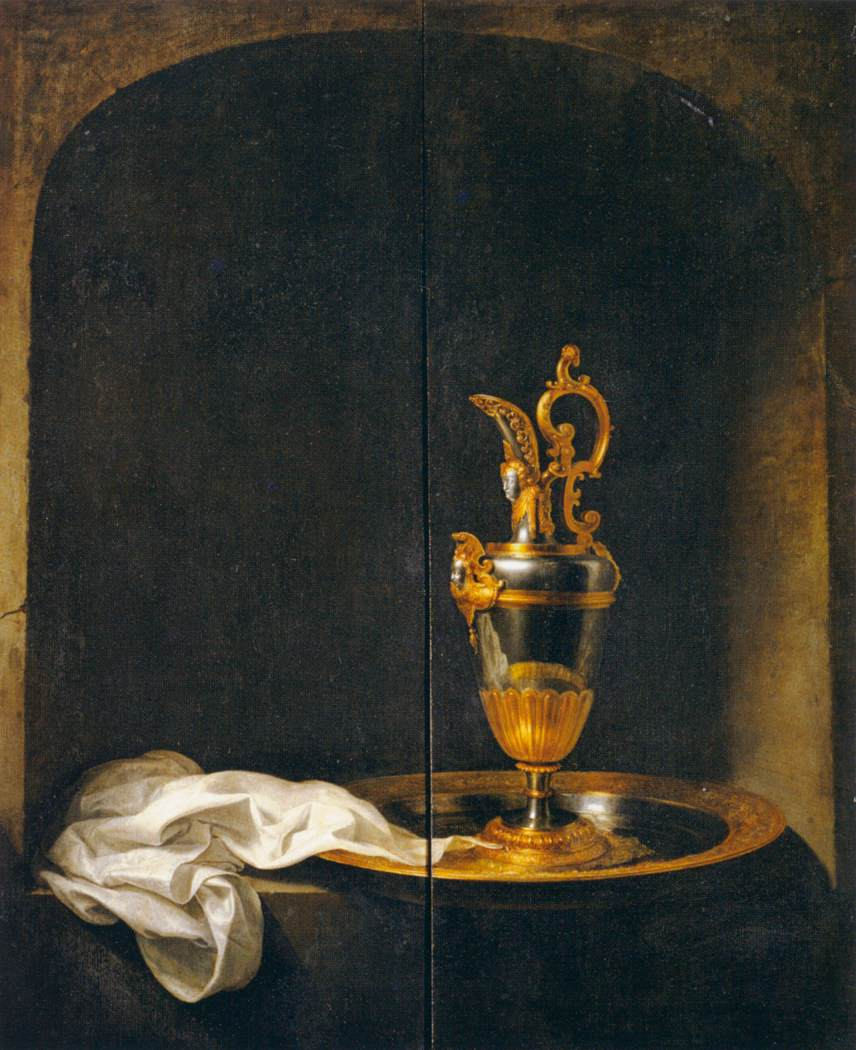
The Silver Ewer c. 1663, Louvre

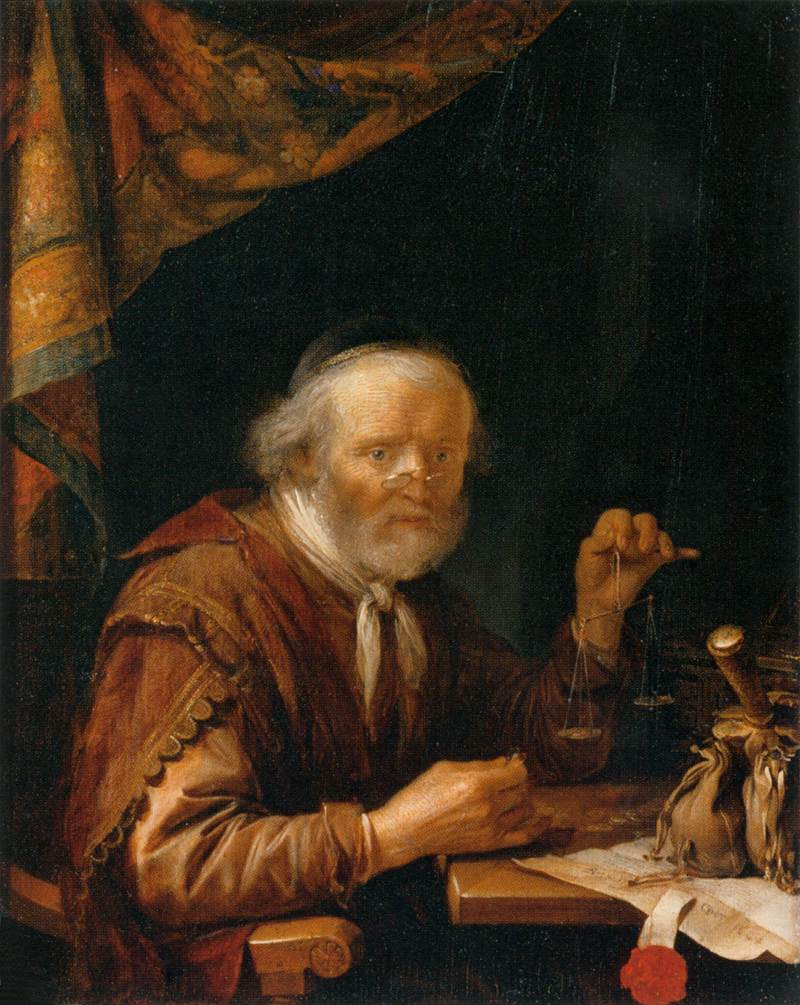
The Moneylender, c. 1664, Louvre

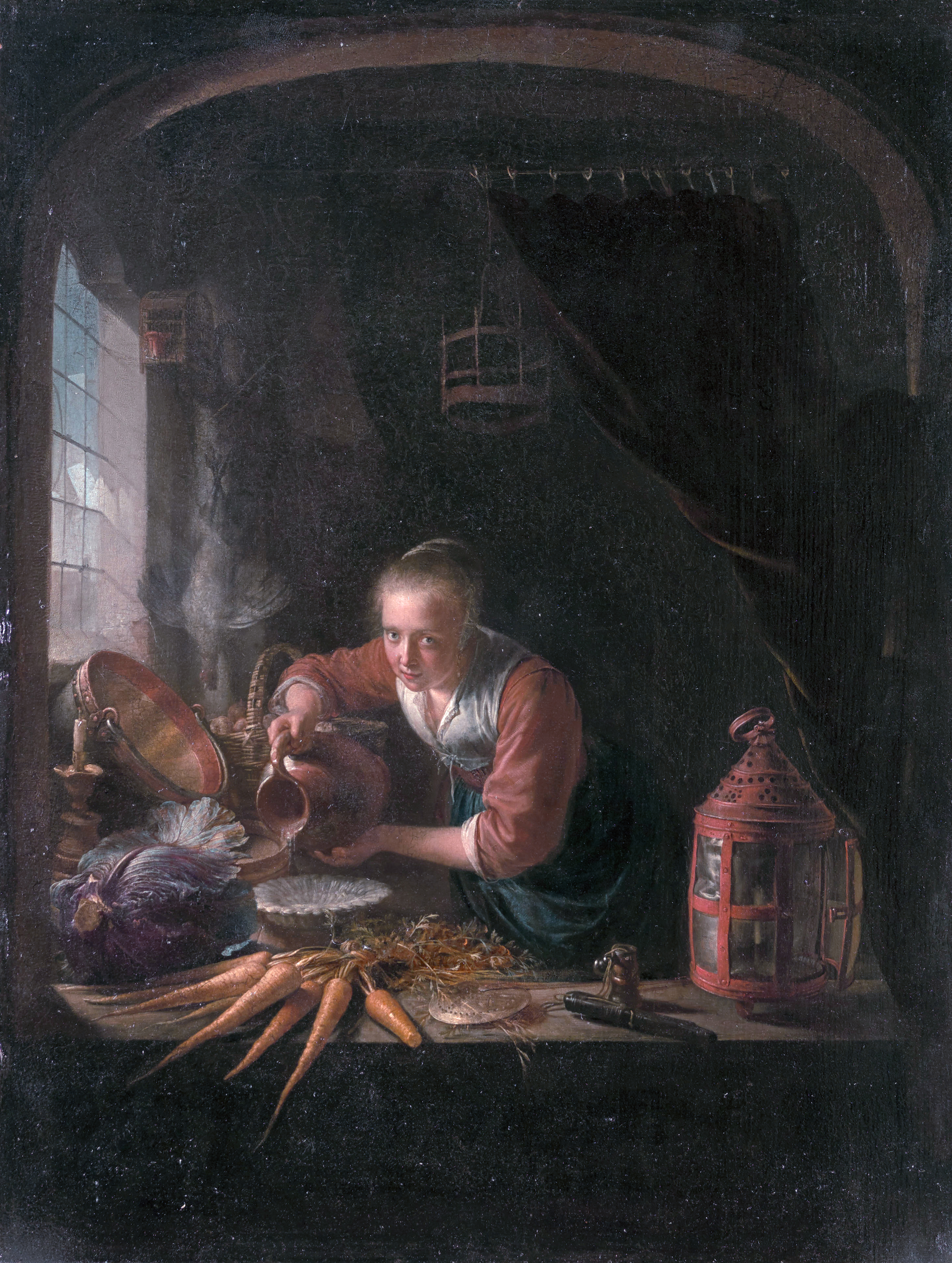
Woman Pouring Water into a Jar, from 1655 until 1665, Louvre

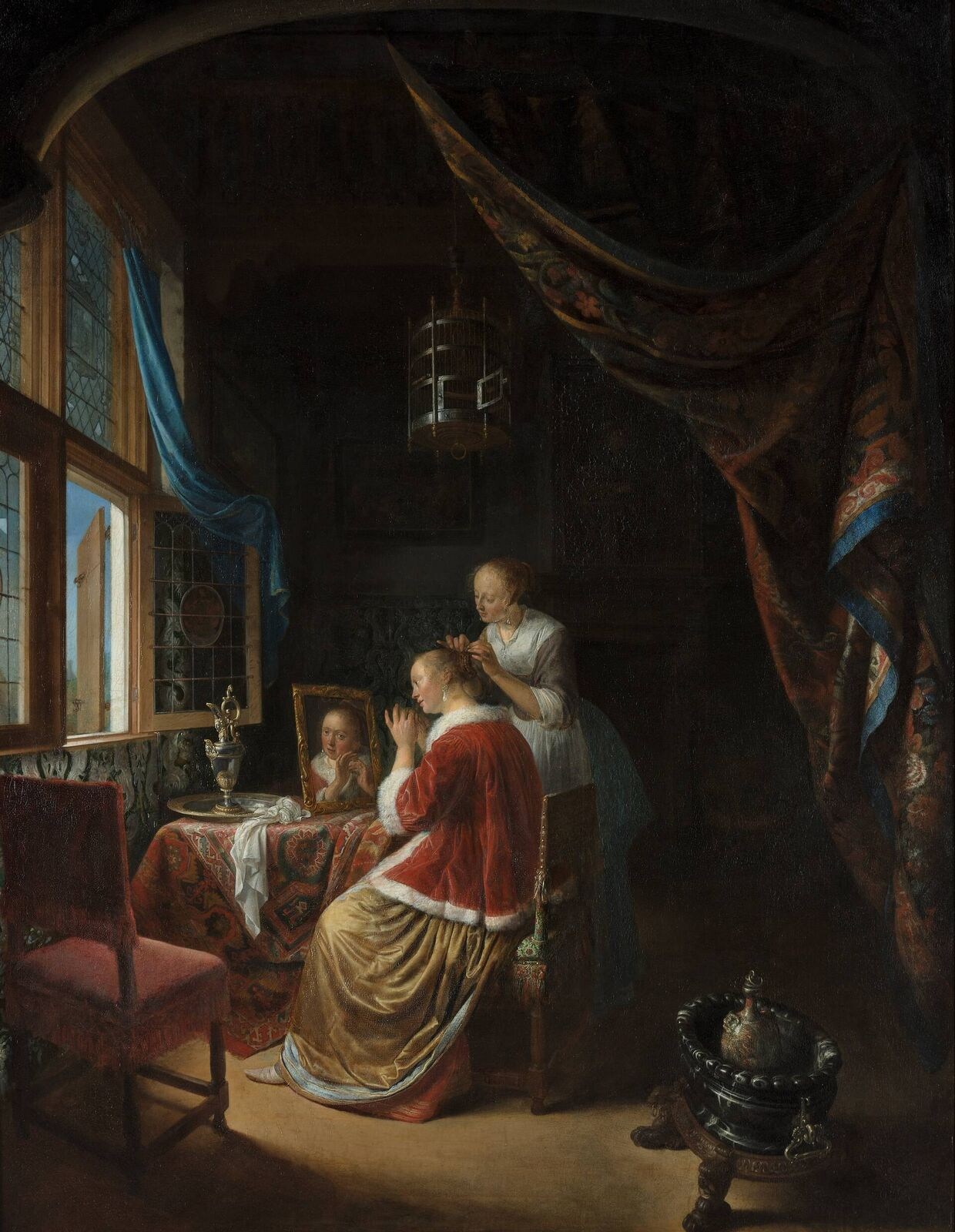
A Young Woman at her Toilet, 1667, Museum Boijmans Van Beuningen

== Cultural references ==
In Honoré de Balzac's 1831 novel La Peau de chagrin, the curiosity shop Raphaël de Valentin enters in the opening sequence contains, among other paintings, "a Gerald Dow which resembled a page of Sterne," and the old shopkeeper is compared to "Gerald Dow's Money-Changer."

In the comic opera The Pirates of Penzance, by Gilbert and Sullivan, the Major-General brags of being able to distinguish works by Raphael from works by Dou and Johan Zoffany.

Dou (as "Gerard Douw") is a character in J. Sheridan Le Fanu's short story "Schalken the Painter". In the 1979 BBC television adaptation of this work, Schalcken the Painter, he was played by Maurice Denham.

Dou is portrayed on film by Toby Jones in Nightwatching (2007).

W. F. Harvey's short story "Old Masters" features a picture by Dou (as Gerhard Dow) as the subject of an ingenious scam. (The story is included in the 2009 Wordsworth Edition omnibus collection of Harvey's stories, "The Beast with Five Fingers".)

A group of boys in Mary Mapes Dodge's Hans Brinker or the Silver Skates visit a museum in Amsterdam and see two paintings by "Gerard Douw", "The Hermit" and "Evening School."

In the 2023 film, “The Little Mermaid” Dou’s painting, Astronomer by Candlelight, is featured as a page in a book which the mermaid, Ariel, flips though while singing “Part of Your World”.

== Sources ==
- Baer, Ronni (2000). "The Life and Art of Gerrit Dou". In Wheelock, Arthur K. (ed.). Gerrit Dou 1613–75: Master Painter in the Age of Rembrandt (exhibition catalogue). National Gallery of Art Washington; Yale University Press. ISBN 0-89468-248-2.
- Gerrit Dou (1613–1675): Master Painter in the Age of Rembrandt at the National Gallery of Art [traveled to Dulwich Picture Gallery 6 September–19 November 2000, and Royal Cabinet of Paintings Mauritshuis 9 December 2000–25 February 2001]
