= A Hermit =

Painting by Gerrit Dou

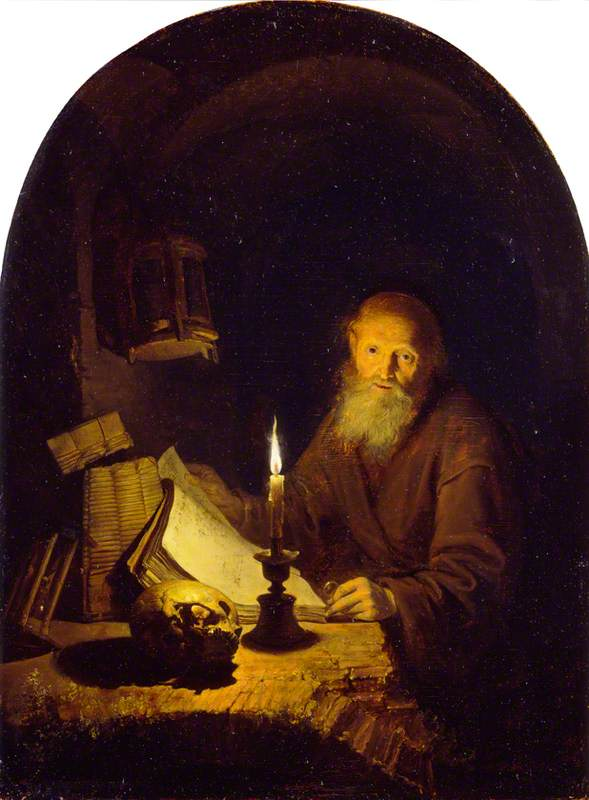
- Artist: Gerrit Dou
- Year: c. 1661
- Medium: Oil on oak panel
- Subject: Religious painting
- Dimensions: 32.1 cm × 23.7 cm (12.6 in × 9.3 in)
- Location: Wallace Collection; London

A Hermit is an oil painting on oak panel by Dutch Golden Age painter Gerrit Dou, created c. 1661. The painting is in the Wallace Collection, in London.

It depicts a monkish figure, of very old age, surrounded by symbols of vanitas (skull, candle, hourglass), which serve as a reminder of the brevity of human life. He looks at the viewer, as he leafs through the Bible open in front of him. He is in a dark interior, illuminated only by the light of the candle.
