= The Quack Doctor =

Painting by Gerrit Dou

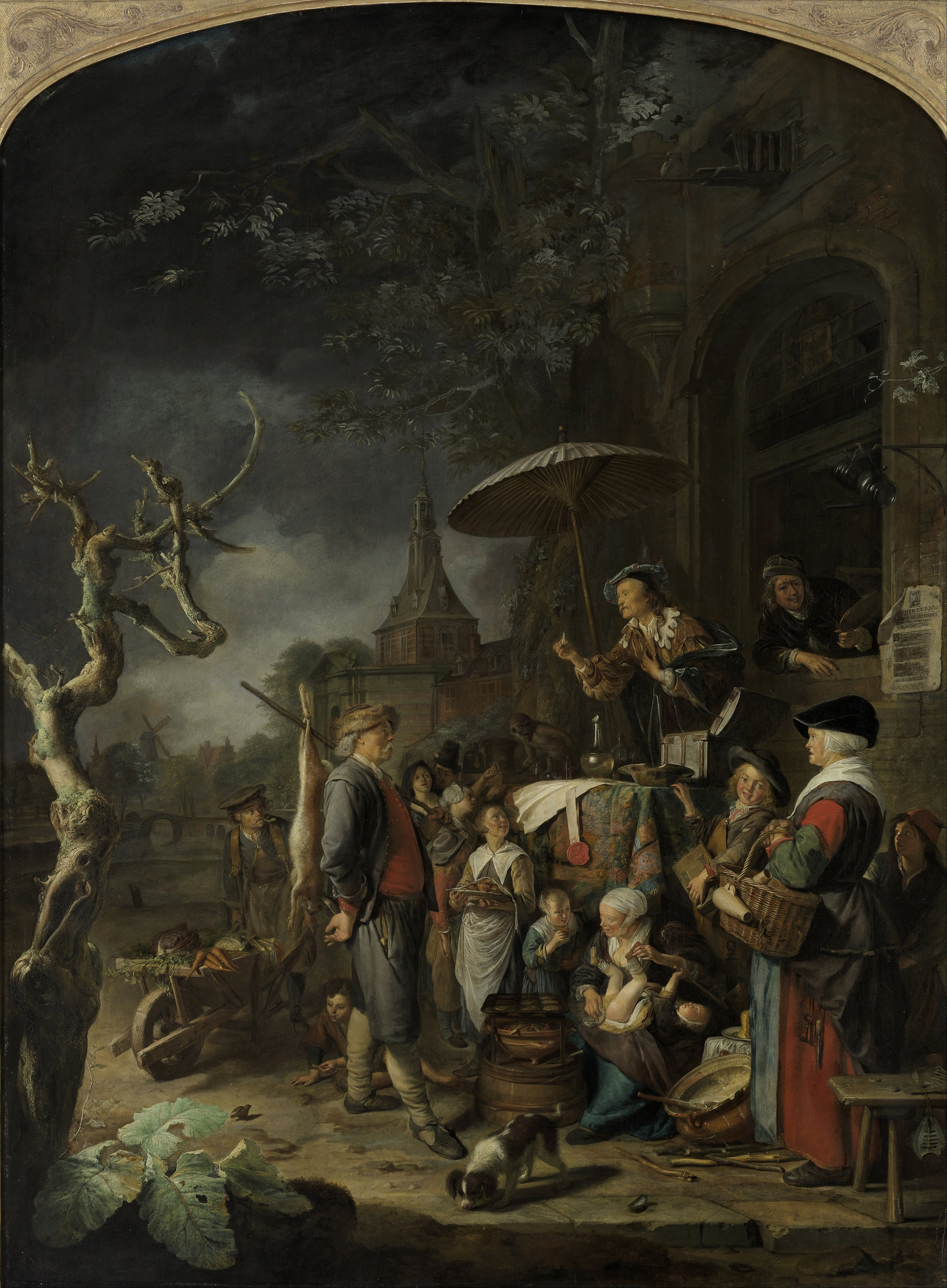
- Artist: Gerrit Dou
- Year: 1652
- Medium: Oil on panel
- Dimensions: 112.4 cm × 83.4 cm (44.3 in × 32.8 in)
- Location: Museum Boijmans Van Beuningen; Rotterdam

The Quack Doctor is an oil-on-panel painting by the Dutch artist Gerrit Dou, from 1652. It is held at the Museum Boijmans Van Beuningen, in Rotterdam.

== Description and analysis ==
It depicts a crowd gathered around a quack doctor as he promotes his wares. Dou also paints himself leaning out the window with a palette in hand. By including himself in the composition, he contrasts the deceptions involved in painting with those of quack medicine. For Dou, the composition was a departure; he was known for niche pieces, which depict an interior framed by a window. The painting has been written about quite extensively and is among the best-known treatments of its subject.

Scenes of quack doctors (kwakzolvers) represented folly and were a common topic in Dutch genre painting, by artists such as Jan Steen, Jan Victors, and Jan Miense Molenaer. Genre scenes of kwaksolvers might depict them performing surgery to the legs, feet, or head (removing the "stone of folly"), extracting teeth, and offering patent medicines.

The painting's symbolism confirms the futility of the quack's offerings. The people are portrayed as gullible, except for those who mirror the quack's deceit: the boy at far right picks the pocket of a woman, and another boy lures a bird. The painting's details would be familiar to its audience from emblem books or proverbs. A woman wiping her child's bottom alludes to the nature of the quack's offerings. She is a seller of pancakes, which sound when cooking like the chatter of the mountebank. His oversized diploma would be seen as fake. The scene takes place during a fair, when laws and guild regulations were loosened, and outside merchants had the freedom to sell their wares. The fair is announced by the poster at right, and the man carrying a dead hare shows the loosening of hunting laws.

Dou's picture is a large work for him, perhaps indicating its importance to the artist. The location can be determined by the town gate, windmill, and bridge in the background: this is Dou's studio in Galgewater, Leiden. The setting highlights Dou's intent to compare the deceptions of the painter, imitator of reality, with those of the quack. Dou may be comforting his higher-class audience by suggesting that they are above the pictured fray, or he may be expressing reservations about his own occupation's use of deception. Dou was an excellent trompe-l'œil painter. The composition includes a living tree and a dead tree—a familiar motif of choice—perhaps implying that only the artistic use of deceit is morally permissible.

== The 17th-century kwakzolver ==
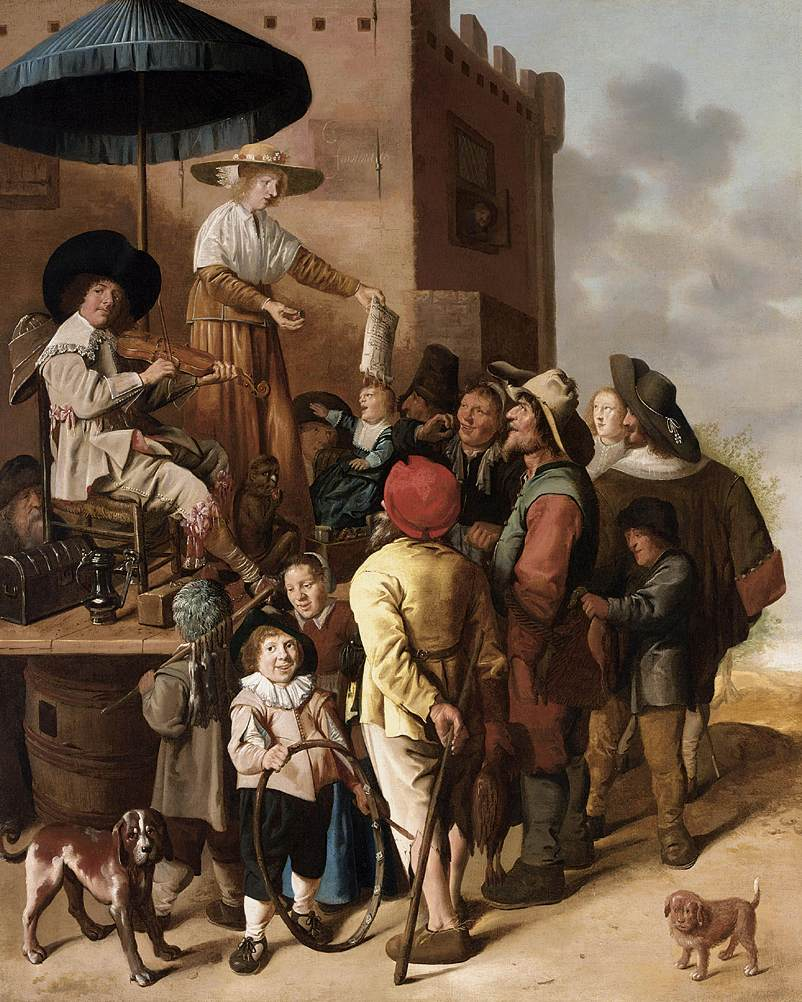
Jan Miense Molenaer, c. 1630

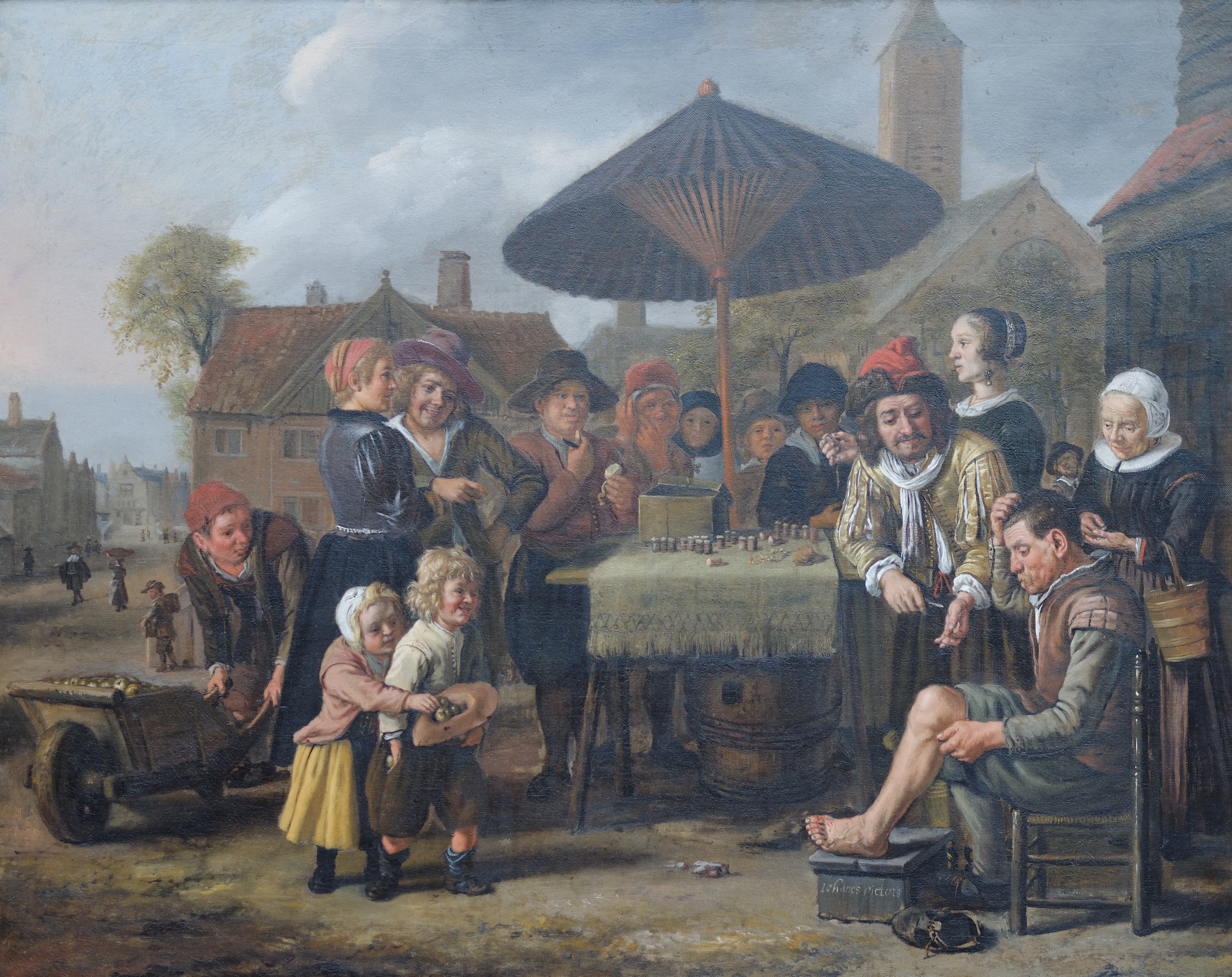
Jan Victors, 1650s

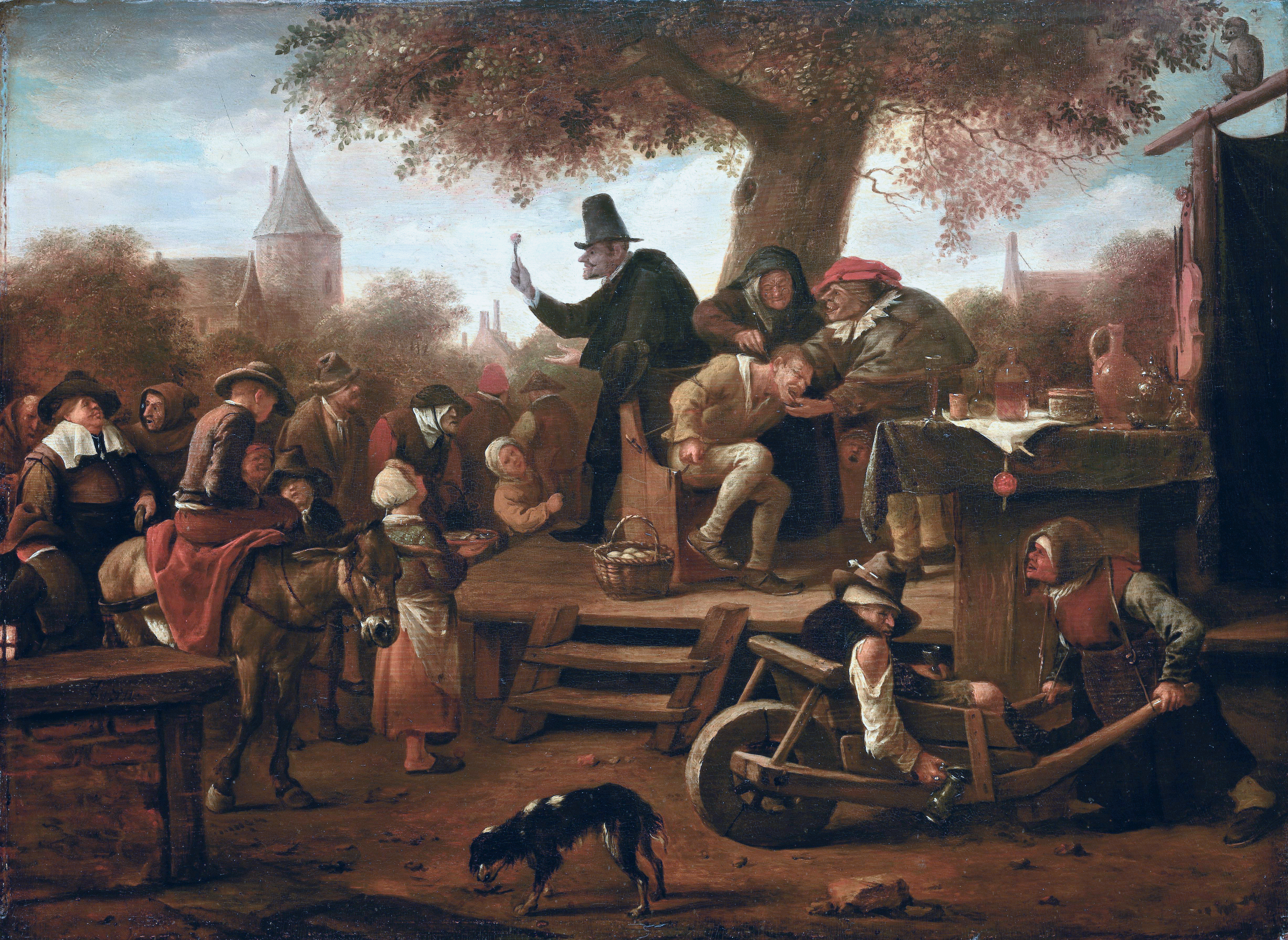
Jan Steen, 1650s
