= Bartholomeus Maton =

Dutch painter

Bartholomeus Maton (1641 – after 1684) was a Dutch Golden Age painter active in Sweden.

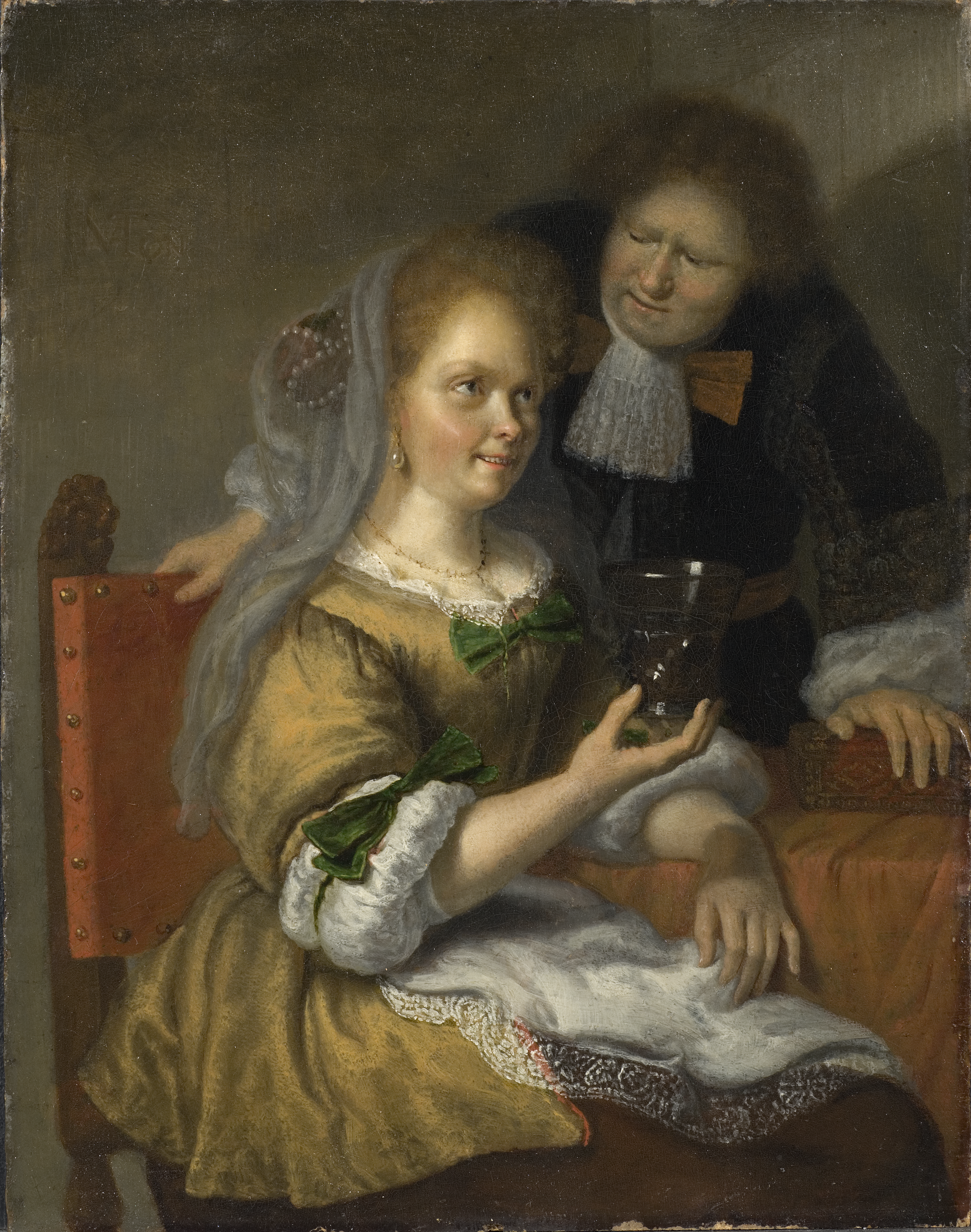
Gallant Conversation

== Biography ==
He was born in Leiden to Huguenot parents where he became a pupil of Gerard Dou who taught him the art of painting in the fijnschilder style. In 1671 he became a member of the Leiden Guild of St. Luke and in 1674-1675 he was headman. In 1679 he is registered as a wine dealer in Stockholm, where he painted for the son of the gun merchant Louis De Geer (1587–1652), but by 1680 he was back in Amsterdam where his will was drawn up. In 1682 he sold a house in Leiden. After 1682 nothing more is known of him, but he probably died in Stockholm after 1684.
