= Old Woman Reading =

Painting by Gerrit Dou

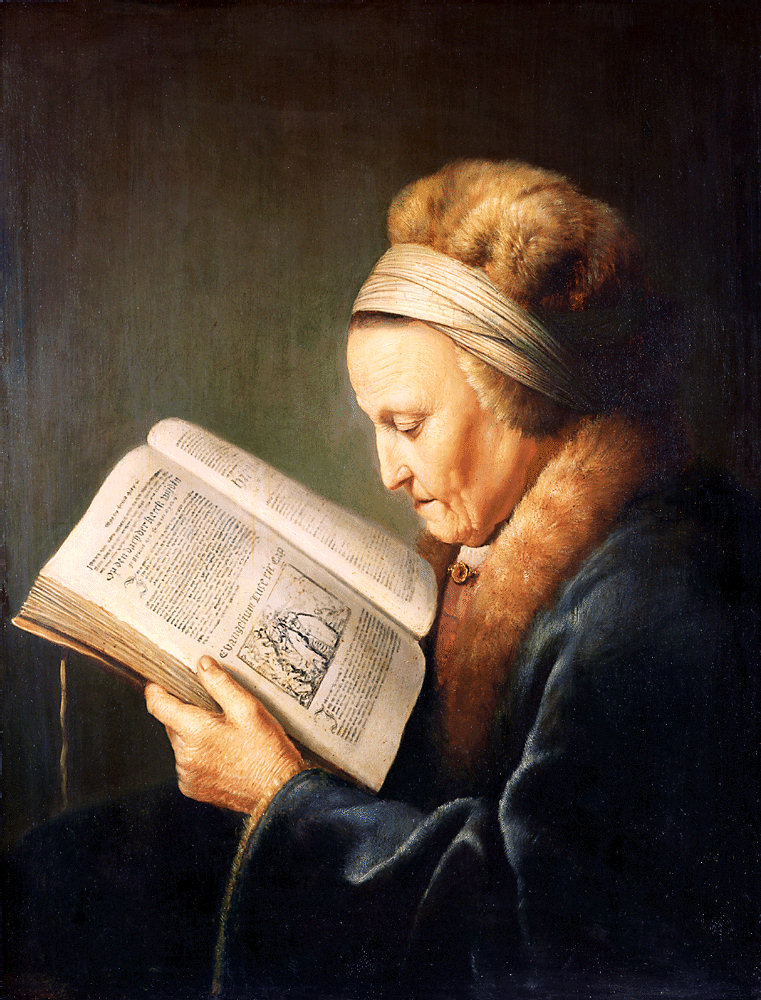
- Artist: Gerrit Dou
- Year: c. 1631-1632
- Medium: Oil on panel
- Dimensions: 71.2 cm × 55.2 cm (28.0 in × 21.7 in)
- Location: Rijksmuseum; Amsterdam

Old Woman Reading, also known as Old Woman Reading a Lectionary, is an oil painting by the Dutch painter Gerrit Dou, made c. 1631–1632. In the past the work was attributed to Rembrandt and was titled Rembrandt's Mother, but this has long been rejected. The portrait has been part of the collection of the Rijksmuseum, in Amsterdam, since November 1912.

== History ==
In 1628, the fourteen-year-old Dou became the first pupil of Rembrandt, only seven years his senior, who shared a studio in Leiden with fellow painter Jan Lievens. Rembrandt himself painted in a refined style during that period, using strong contrasts between light and dark. This technique is also clearly reflected in the current painting. While Rembrandt would later emphatically reject this refinement, Dou focused on perfecting it further. After his teacher moved to Amsterdam in 1632, he became the founder of the Leiden Fijnschilder.

== Description ==
In Old Woman Reading, Dou shows his talent and an exceptional technical skill for his young age. Not only the old woman and her clothes are painted with great precision, but also the Biblical text in the lectionary and the accompanying print are also extremely detailed and clearly visible. What she reads is plain to see: the beginning of the 19th chapter of the Gospel of Luke, where it states that whoever really wants to do good should give as much of his earthly possessions to the poor. That message seems to contrast with the old woman's expensive clothing, who apparently still clings to her possessions.

Dou depicts the old woman in a remarkably realistic approach for his time by Northern European standards. He gives the viewer the feeling that he is close to the old woman, while she does not seem to notice it because of her rendering in profile and concentration on reading. The use of chiaroscuro, which he had learned from Rembrandt, is typical and emphasizes the most important details of the work. The background is smooth, sober and not distracting. Compositionally, the artist creates a soothing diagonal contrast between the upper left and the lower right parts.

== Authorship ==
The painting was for a long time mistaken for being a portrait that Rembrandt made of his mother, hence the title of Rembrandt's Mother. It fitted with the ancient idea that Rembrandt had depicted many of his relatives in his paintings. His authorship seemed a foregone conclusion until 1900. During a major Rembrandt exhibition held in Amsterdam in 1898, when the painting was still in the collection of A. H. Hoekwater, it was presented as such, but soon after it came into doubt. In 1901, art historian Wilhelm Martin suggested in a book about Gerrit Dou that he was probably his author. He mentioned the style characteristics, pointing to Dou's use of the chiaroscuro and the smooth surface structure typical of his work, and also to the fact that Dou and Rembrandt, as well as Lievens, often used the same models. In fact, the old woman depicted here appears in works by all the three painters and Dou himself painted her several times.

After 1900, it became increasingly clear that the designation of some of Rembrandt's models as his relatives was groundless. When the work was offered to the Rijksmuseum in November 1912 from the bequest of A. H. Hoekwater, it was therefore exhibited as a work by Dou under the current title. In 2005 it was one of the major works in the exhibition "Rembrandt's Mother, Myth and Reality", in the Museum De Lakenhal, in Leiden.
