= The Woman with Dropsy =

Painting by Gerard Dou

- La Femme hydropique (French)
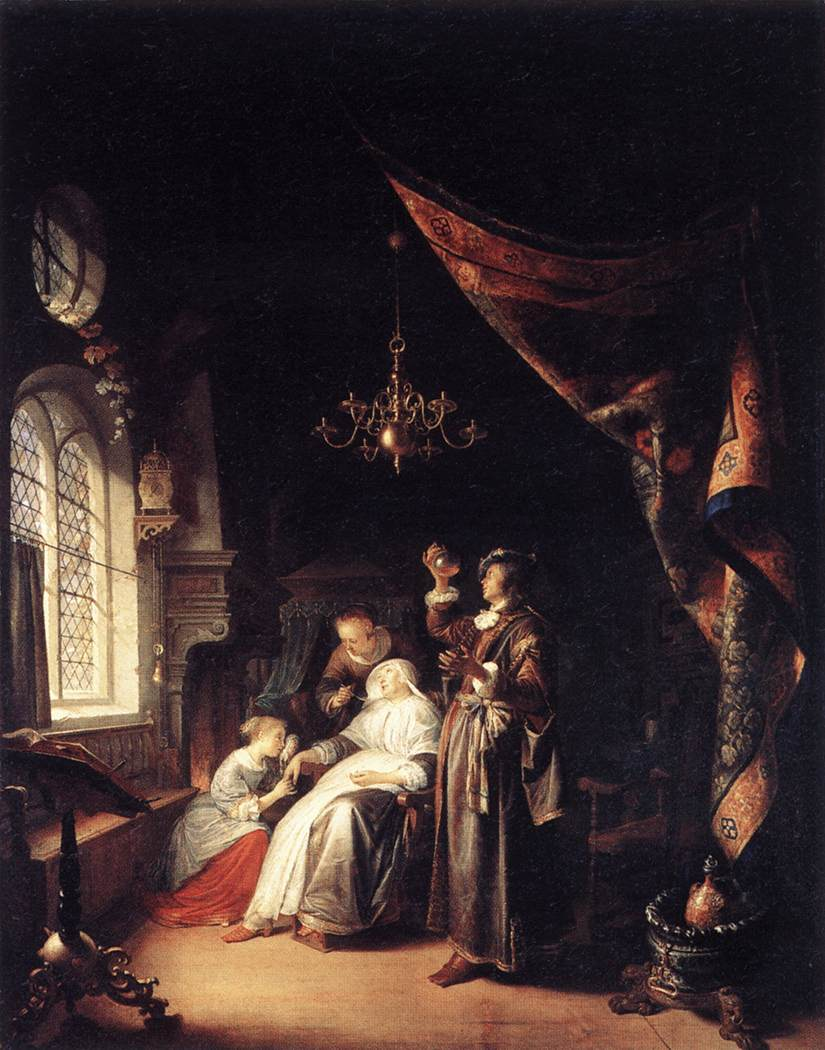
- Artist: Gerrit Dou
- Year: 1663
- Medium: Oil on panel
- Dimensions: 86 cm × 67 cm (34 in × 26 in)
- Location: Musée du Louvre; Paris

The Woman with Dropsy or The Dropsical Woman (French: La Femme hydropique) is an oil-on-panel painting by Dutch Golden Age painter Gerrit Dou, created in 1663. It shows a woman suffering from edema and is considered as one of Dou's masterpieces.

Previously in Charles Emmanuel IV's collections, he gave it to Bertrand Clauzel in December 1798. Then adjutant-general to revolutionary France's Armée d'Italie, Clauzel offered it to the French Directory, which in 1799 added it to the Republic's central art museum (later to become the Louvre Museum), making it the first painting to be donated to that collection and placing Clauzel at the top of the plaque of donors on the "rotonde d'Apollon". It is still in the Louvre as INV. 1213.
