= Leslie Megahey =

British television producer and director (1944–2022)

Norman Leslie Megahey (22 December 1944 – 27 August 2022) was a British television producer, director and writer.

Born in Belfast, Northern Ireland, the son of Thomas Megahey (a minister) and Beatrice (née Walton), Leslie Megahey was educated at King Edward VI School in Lichfield. Early works for the BBC included Tolkien in Oxford (1968), Canvas: 7: Sunflowers: Van Gogh (1971), and Omnibus File: Thrillers and Crime Fiction (1972).

== Arena ==
He was the editor of the BBC television documentary series Arena (1977–79; 1982–83); during his time on the series he divided it into Arena Theatre and Arena Art and Design, and Arena became less of a magazine-style programme and more a home for short, distinctive and stylish films about mainly British theatre and visual arts. During this period his programme Henry Moore Meets Leonardo (1978) was broadcast, in which the sculptor Henry Moore discussed Leonardo da Vinci's anatomical drawings. His two-part Arena special The Orson Welles Story (1982) programmes won a 'Best Documentary' BAFTA in 1983.

== Omnibus ==
When in 1979 Megahey was offered the opportunity to become the editor of the BBC's arts documentary series Omnibus (1979–81; 1984–87) he accepted on the condition that he could make Schalcken the Painter, a fictional tale woven round the lives of actual historic figures Godfried Schalcken (Jeremy Clyde) and Gerrit Dou (Maurice Denham). Written and directed by Megahey, he shot it in a docudrama style, using a minimum of dialogue. It filled the slot taken in previous years by the BBC's traditional A Ghost Story for Christmas, which had been cancelled in 1978, and aired on 23 December 1979. The television film was a 70-minute-long adaptation of Le Fanu's 1839 gothic tale Strange Event in the Life of Schalken the Painter (sic). During his editorship Omnibus won a BAFTA in 1981.

Megahey wrote and directed the 1987 BBC Two television play Cariani and the Courtesans, which presented a fictionalised account of the artist Giovanni Cariani's time in Venice, with Cariani (Paul McGann) interacting with other historical characters, such as Tullia d'Aragona (Diana Quick), Marcantonio Raimondi (Simon Callow), and Francesco Albani (Michael Gough), with a brief "cameo" by Albrecht Dürer (Frederik de Groot), and narrated by Charles Gray. The narrative is woven around the painting of a number of his works, principally Four Courtesans and Three Gentlemen.

In 1988 the BBC broadcast his adaptation of Béla Bartók's opera Bluebeard's Castle (as Duke Bluebeard's Castle).

== Later years ==
He wrote and directed the 1993 film The Hour of the Pig for the BBC, which stars Colin Firth, Ian Holm, Donald Pleasence, Nicol Williamson, Jim Carter and Amina Annabi. The film was released in the United States as The Advocate; it is usually categorised as a drama, although it has also been classified as a mystery or a black comedy.

With Jana Bokova and Gualberto Ferrari he wrote the screenplay for the Spanish-language film Diario para un cuento (1999) which won the Argentinian Silver Condor Award for Best Adapted Screenplay. He produced the 2003 docudrama Leonardo which starred Mark Rylance in the title role, and which won the 2004 BAFTA 'Huw Wheldon Award for Specialised Programme or Series'. Megahey was one of the writers of the nature documentary Earth (2007), which depicts the diversity of wild habitats and creatures across the planet.

For The Guardian he wrote obituaries for David Wheatley (2009) and Frank Whitten (2011), among others.

Megahey died on 27 August 2022, at the age of 77.
