= Cariani =

Cariani is a surname. Notable people with the surname include:

- Giovanni Cariani (1490–1547), Italian painter
- John Cariani (born 1969), American actor and playwright
