= Lute Player =

Lute Player or The Lute Player may refer to:

- Lute Player (Boulogne), a painting by Valentin de Boulogne
- The Lute Player (Caravaggio), three paintings by Caravaggio
- The Lute Player (Cariani), a painting by Giovanni Cariani
- "The Lute Player" (fairy tale), a Russian fairy tale
- The Lute Player (Orazio Gentileschi), a painting by Orazio Gentileschi
  - The Lute Player, a fictional painting by Artemisia Gentileschi, Orazio Gentileschi's daughter
  - Self-Portrait as a Lute Player, an actual painting by Artemisia Gentileschi
- The Lute Player (Hals), a painting by Frans Hals
- The Lute Player (Dirck van Baburen), painting

== See also ==
- Lutenist, a musician who plays the lute
