= Portrait of a Young Woman as Saint Agatha =

Painting by Giovanni Cariani

A Young Woman as Saint Agatha
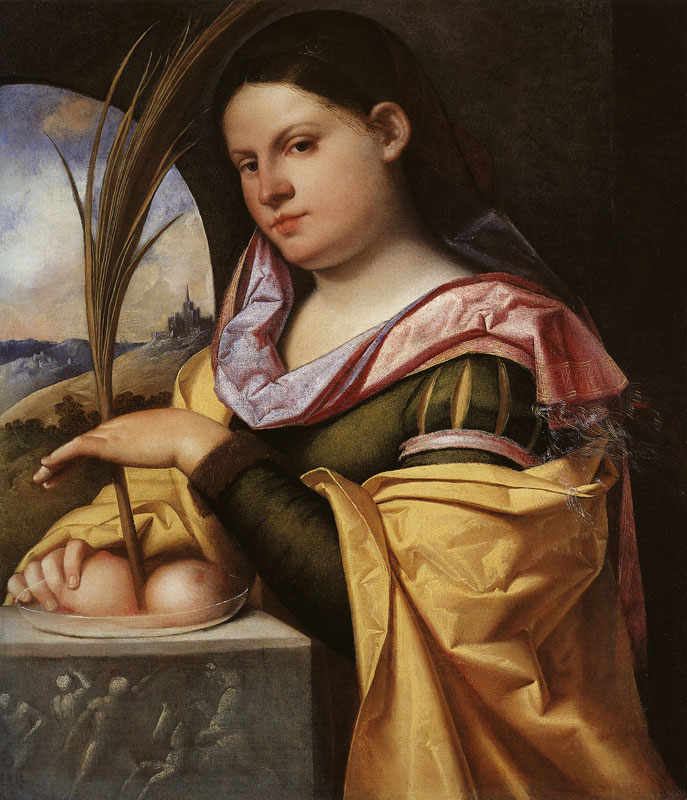
- Year: 1516–1517
- Medium: Oil on canvas
- Dimensions: 69 cm × 58 cm (27 in × 23 in)
- Location: Scottish National Gallery; Edinburgh
- Accession: NG 2494

Portrait of a Young Woman as Saint Agatha is an oil painting on canvas by the Italian Renaissance painter Giovanni Cariani, created between 1516 and 1517. It is now in the Scottish National Gallery in Edinburgh.

== See also ==
- Agatha of Sicily

== Gallery ==
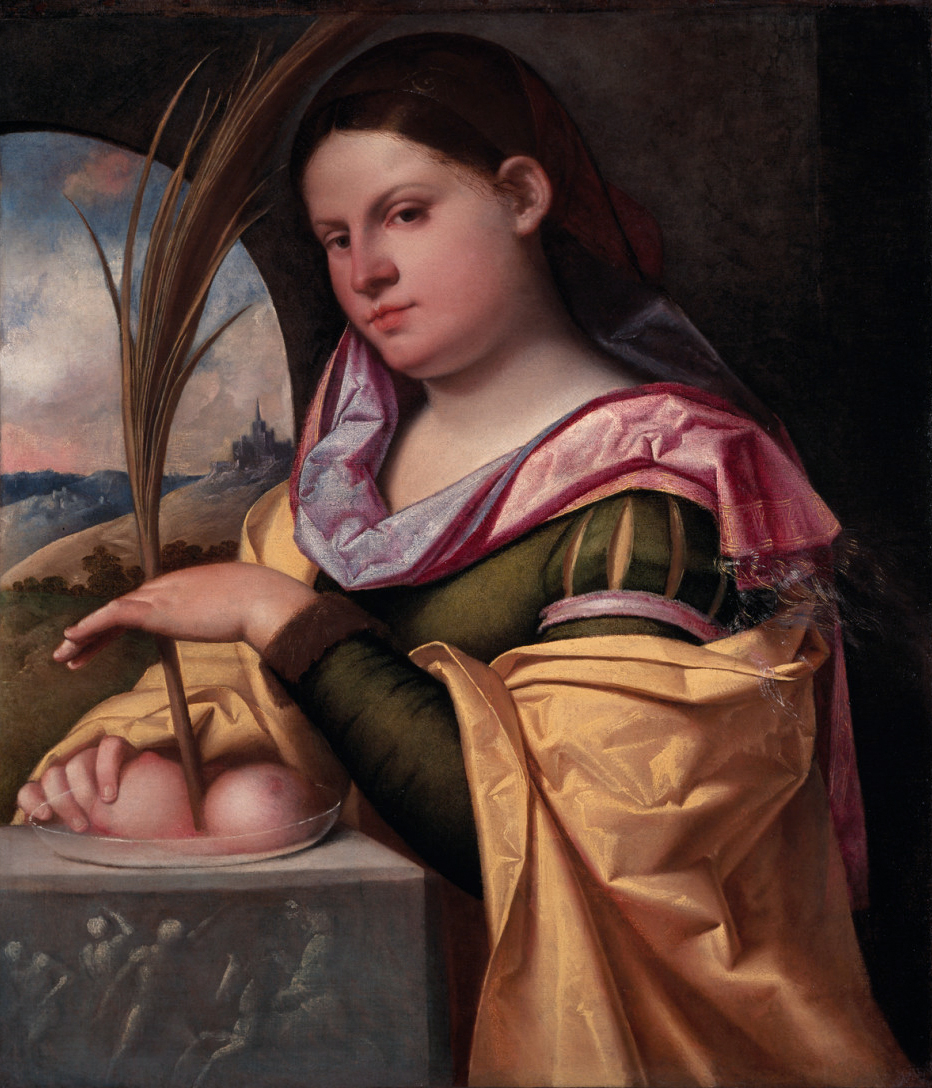
Portrait of a Young Woman as Saint Agatha, 1516–1517

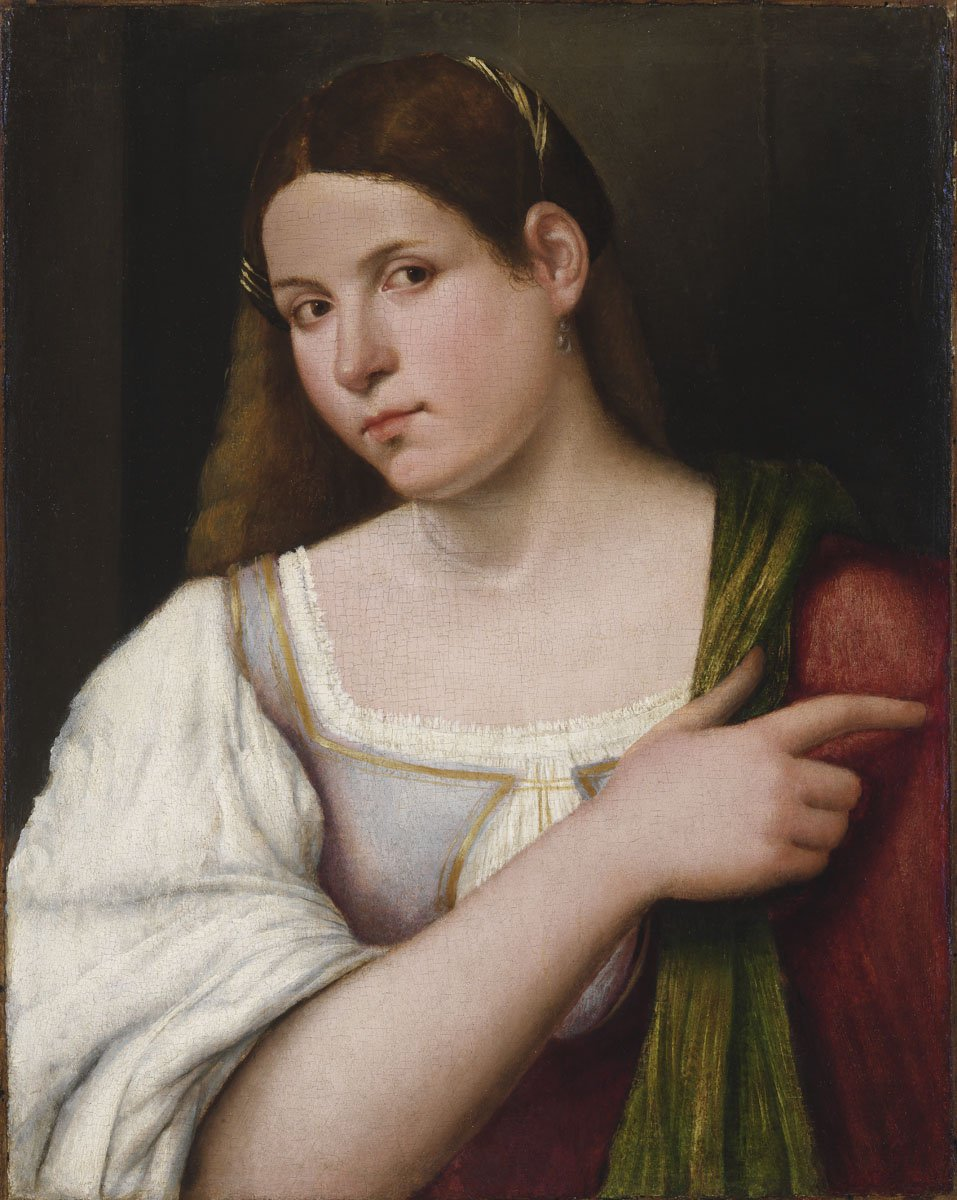
Portrait of a Young Woman, c. 1508–1510 (52.5 x 42.8 cm)

== Sources ==
- "Portrait of a Young Woman as Saint Agatha". National Galleries Scotland. National Galleries of Scotland ID: 5747. Retrieved 26 November 2022.
