= Cheryl Kennedy =

English actress and singer

- Occupations: Actress, singer

Cheryl Kennedy is an English actress and singer.

== Early life and career ==
She was born in Enfield, Middlesex, and educated at a convent. Her first appearance was at Stratford East Theatre Workshop in What a Crazy World. She enjoyed success as a stage actress, notably in West End musicals such as the 1967 revival of The Boy Friend. Her other West End theatre credits include Victoria in Half a Sixpence, Winnie in The Matchgirls, Belinda in Jorrocks at the New Theatre, and Alan Ayckbourn's Absent Friends at the Garrick Theatre. In 1977 she appeared as Maggie in Teeth 'n' Smiles at the Oxford Playhouse.

She starred alongside Michael Crawford in a production of Flowers for Algernon at the Queen's Theatre and features on the original London cast recording of the show. She appeared in the TV musical Pickwick for the BBC in 1969. During the 1970s she appeared in several British films, including the Lust segment of The Magnificent Seven Deadly Sins (1971) and as Jo Mason in the Dick Emery film Ooh... You Are Awful (1972). Her television credits include weekly singing appearances in the first series of the BBC show That's Life in 1973, The Strauss Family, The Sweeney, Schalcken the Painter, Hari-Kari and Sally, When the Bough Breaks, It's a Lovely Day Tomorrow and Time and Time Again. For ITV she was in an episode of the series The Professionals and The Bill (1999) episode "Denial".

Kennedy took the role of Eliza Doolittle opposite Rex Harrison in a 1980 revival of the 1950s Broadway production of My Fair Lady. Her casting was initially challenged by Actor's Equity because she had been chosen ahead of more than 50 American actress finalists but Rex Harrison insisted that a British-born actress should take the part; additionally, Mike Merrick, the show's producer, maintained her singing ability, her experience in musicals in London's West End and the authenticity she would bring as a result of her and her parents' lives in the London area made her uniquely qualified for the role. From the show's opening in New Orleans in September 1980, she continued in the role for nearly a year as it toured American cities. Shortly before it began a run on Broadway at the Uris Theater on 18 August 1981, she was forced to withdraw after a physician diagnosed nodes on her vocal cords; Nancy Ringham, an American singer and Kennedy's understudy, assumed the role in her Broadway debut.

== Personal life ==
In 1973 she married actor Tom Courtenay; the union ended in divorce in 1982.
