= The Hour of the Pig =

1993 film by Leslie Megahey

- American theatrical release poster
- Directed by: Leslie Megahey
- Written by: Leslie Megahey
- Produced by: David M. Thompson
- Starring: Colin Firth; Ian Holm; Donald Pleasence; Amina Annabi; Nicol Williamson; Michael Gough; Sophie Dix; Harriet Walter; Jim Carter; Lysette Anthony; Vincent Grass
- Cinematography: John Hooper
- Music by: Alexandre Desplat
- Production companies: Miramax Films; BBC Films; CiBy 2000
- Distributed by: Mayfair Entertainment (United Kingdom); CiBy 2000 (France)
- Release dates: 25 September 1993 (France, Dinard Festival of British Cinema); 21 January 1994 (UK)
- Running time: 112 minutes (UK)
- Countries: United Kingdom; France
- Language: English

The Hour of the Pig is a 1993 film by writer/director Leslie Megahey, produced by the BBC. The film stars Colin Firth, Ian Holm, Donald Pleasence, Nicol Williamson, Jim Carter and Amina Annabi. It was released in the United States as The Advocate. The film is usually categorised as a drama, although it could also be classified as a mystery or a black comedy.

For its UK theatrical release, the film was given a 15 certificate, while the North American release was rated R, primarily due to its nudity and sexual content.

== Plot ==
The Hour of the Pig is set in 15th-century France and is based upon the career and case files of lawyer Bartholomew Chassenee, who served as an advocate for animals who were accused of crimes. At the time, animal trials were used to determine if animals were the perpetrators of supernatural mayhem. Animals were subject to the same civil laws and penalties as human beings under French law, 1403–1596.

Richard Courtois and his clerk Mathieu have left the decadence of Paris in order to practise law in the quiet rural village of Abbeville, in the province of Ponthieu, then part of Burgundy.

For his first case, he defends a farmer who is accused of killing his wife's lover. Courtois gets him acquitted. In his next case, Courtois fails to save Jeannine, a woman accused of witchcraft. He asks for rats to be called as witnesses to testify that she did not bribe them to infect her neighbor; when the rats do not appear the following day as summoned, this charge is struck off. However, Courtois is unfamiliar with the difference between the Roman law of France and the Ponthieu customary law, and she is sentenced to be hanged anyway. At her execution, Jeannine says she will not curse the town but blesses it, saying a fine knight will arrive and deliver them from their lying and evil.

Courtois takes on a case defending a pig that is accused of killing a young Jewish boy. The pig belongs to a band of Moors (alternatively/first thought to be Gypsies, being referred to as coming from "Little Egypt") passing through town. Two of the Moors, Mahmoud and his sister Samira, appeal to Courtois to save the pig, as it is their only source of food for the coming winter. Courtois declines. Samira later enters Courtois's room at night and quietly strips naked, offering her body in return for his services, but he refuses this. The next day he offers her enough money to purchase two pigs, but she does not accept this.

As Courtois delves deeper into the case and becomes more involved with Samira, he discovers that there is more at work than a simple murder. His work is brought to the attention of Seigneur Jehan d'Auferre, who offers to bribe Courtois, also hinting that his daughter Filette is available for marriage.

Courtois's relationship with Samira becomes common knowledge. The Seigneur decides to sit in at court and uses this knowledge to threaten Courtois into letting the pig be executed. Just as the case seems to be over, the Advent festival begins and the case is adjourned.

The prosecutor Pincheon urges Courtois to go back to Paris and not waste his life among ignorant, superstitious peasants.

The skeleton of another Jewish boy who went missing over a year ago is found while Courtois's house is being built. Courtois now suspects a human serial killer is at large and the pig has been framed.

During the Festival of the Advent, Samira performs for a gathering of notables at the Seigneur's chateau. She is almost arrested for drawing a knife on the Seigneur's son after he pours wine down her blouse. Courtois boldly leads her away. That night, he rescues a boy from a masked horseman wielding an axe.

Courtois confronts the Seigneur, telling him his son is the killer. The Seigneur does not deny it and reveals that his son has left for England to be treated. At the trial, the pig is acquitted when Valliere, the farmer Courtois saved in his first case at Abbeville, brings in a replica pig which he claims absconded at the time of the killing.

As Courtois leaves, he sees a knight arriving just as Jeannine had foretold. After he has left, the knight takes off his armor to reveal that he bears the characteristic buboes of the Black Death.

== US version ==
The Hour of the Pig was released in the United States by Miramax as The Advocate. Harvey Weinstein was actively involved in the cuts of films distributed by Miramax; this film was no exception. For US release, the film was trimmed down, including a sex scene edited in part to avoid a stronger than R rating. The name of the film was changed as part of an advertising campaign. The US film poster and opening crawl instruct the audience not to "reveal the client". The campaign did not improve sales for the film.

== UK version ==
The UK version opened at the London Film Festival on 14 November 1993. Only the shorter (R-rated) version of the film was released to VHS or DVD in North America. The full version has been released on DVD and screened on television in some European countries.

== Harvey Weinstein scandal ==
When the Harvey Weinstein sexual abuse allegations first broke in 2017, one of the early accusers was Sophie Dix. She had claimed that he "performed an unwelcome sexual act in her presence after she was invited up his room at the Savoy hotel 'to watch some rushes'" for The Hour of The Pig. She called the experience "the single most damaging thing that's happened in my life". Some of her scenes in the UK version of the film (including an explicit sex scene), as well as a short voice over, were trimmed or cut. It has been suggested that Weinstein had done this as retribution for her attempted rejection of his advances.
