= Johannes le Francq van Berkhey =

Dutch painter

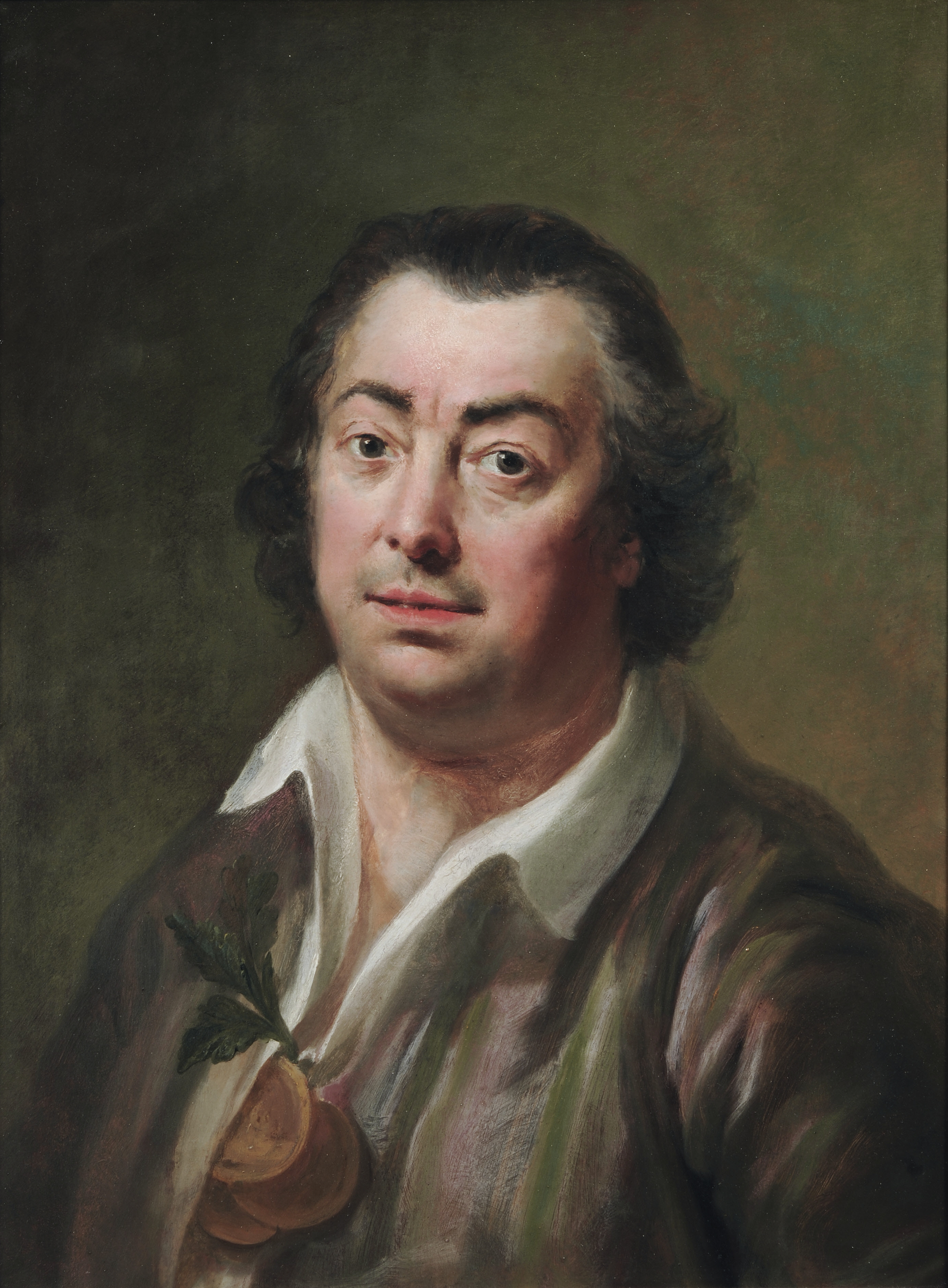
- Johannes le Francq van Berkhey by Hendrik Pothoven
- Born: 1729; Leiden
- Died: 1812 (aged 82–83); Leiden
- Other name: Franc van Berkhey
- Occupation: 18th-century painter from the Northern Netherlands

Johannes le Francq van Berkhey (1729–1812) was an 18th-century painter, scientist, physician and poet from the Dutch Republic.

== Biography ==
He was born in Leiden. According to Roeland van Eynden and Adriaan van der Willigen in their dictionary of artists known as Geschiedenis der vaderlandsche schilderkunst, he was a pupil along with Petrus Camper of the genre painter Louis de Moni. His grandfather was an art dealer in Leiden and brought him up after his father died.

According to the RKD he is known as an illustrator and author, and was a pupil along with Petrus Camper of the painter Carel Isaak de Moor. He is best known for his illustrations of natural history objects. According to his author page in the DBNL, he is known for his Natural History of the Netherlands in 4 volumes which he wrote from 1769 to 1776. He died in Leiden.
