= Schalcken the Painter =

1979 British television horror story

- DVD Cover
- Based on: Strange Event in the Life of Schalken the Painter by Sheridan Le Fanu
- Screenplay by: Leslie Megahey; Paul Humfress
- Directed by: Leslie Megahey
- Starring: Jeremy Clyde; Maurice Denham; Cheryl Kennedy; John Justin; Ann Tirard; Anthony Sharp
- Country of origin: United Kingdom
- Original language: English

Production
- Cinematography: John Hooper
- Editor: Paul Humfress
- Running time: 68 minutes
- Production company: BBC

Original release
- Network: BBC
- Release: 23 December 1979

Schalcken the Painter is a 1979 British television gothic horror film based on the 1839 story Strange Event in the Life of Schalken the Painter by Sheridan Le Fanu, and stars Jeremy Clyde as Godfried Schalcken and Maurice Denham as Gerrit Dou. It aired on the BBC as an episode of Omnibus on 23 December 1979, following in the tradition of A Ghost Story for Christmas.

== Plot ==
The painter Godfried Schalcken sees his true love, Rose, the niece of the artist Gerrit Dou, wedded by contract for a large sum of money to Vanderhausen of Rotterdam, a strange and ghostly figure. Filled with dread, Rose begs Schalcken to run off with her to save her from the marriage, but he is cowardly and ambitious and wants to continue his studies with Dou; instead he says he will buy back the marriage contract when he is successful.

The marriage goes ahead as agreed, and nothing is heard of Rose until she escapes some time later and returns home distraught and starving and begging for protection, but she is pursued by her ghostly husband and disappears.

On the death of Dou a melancholy Schalcken lingers in the church after the funeral service, where a terrifying encounter with his former love leaves his senses reeling.

== Cast ==
- Charles Gray as the narrator
- Jeremy Clyde as Godfried Schalcken
- Maurice Denham as Gerrit Dou
- Cheryl Kennedy as Rose
- John Justin as Vanderhausen
- Anthony Sharp as Gentleman
- Roy Evans as Coachman
- Ann Tirard as Brothel Madam
- Val Penny as Lesbia
- Victor Dear as Manservant
- Rosemary Jenner as Maidservant
- Eric Francis as Goldsmith
- Amanda Carlson as Francoise
- Helena Clayton as Hendrijke
- Charles Stewart as Rembrandt

== Production ==
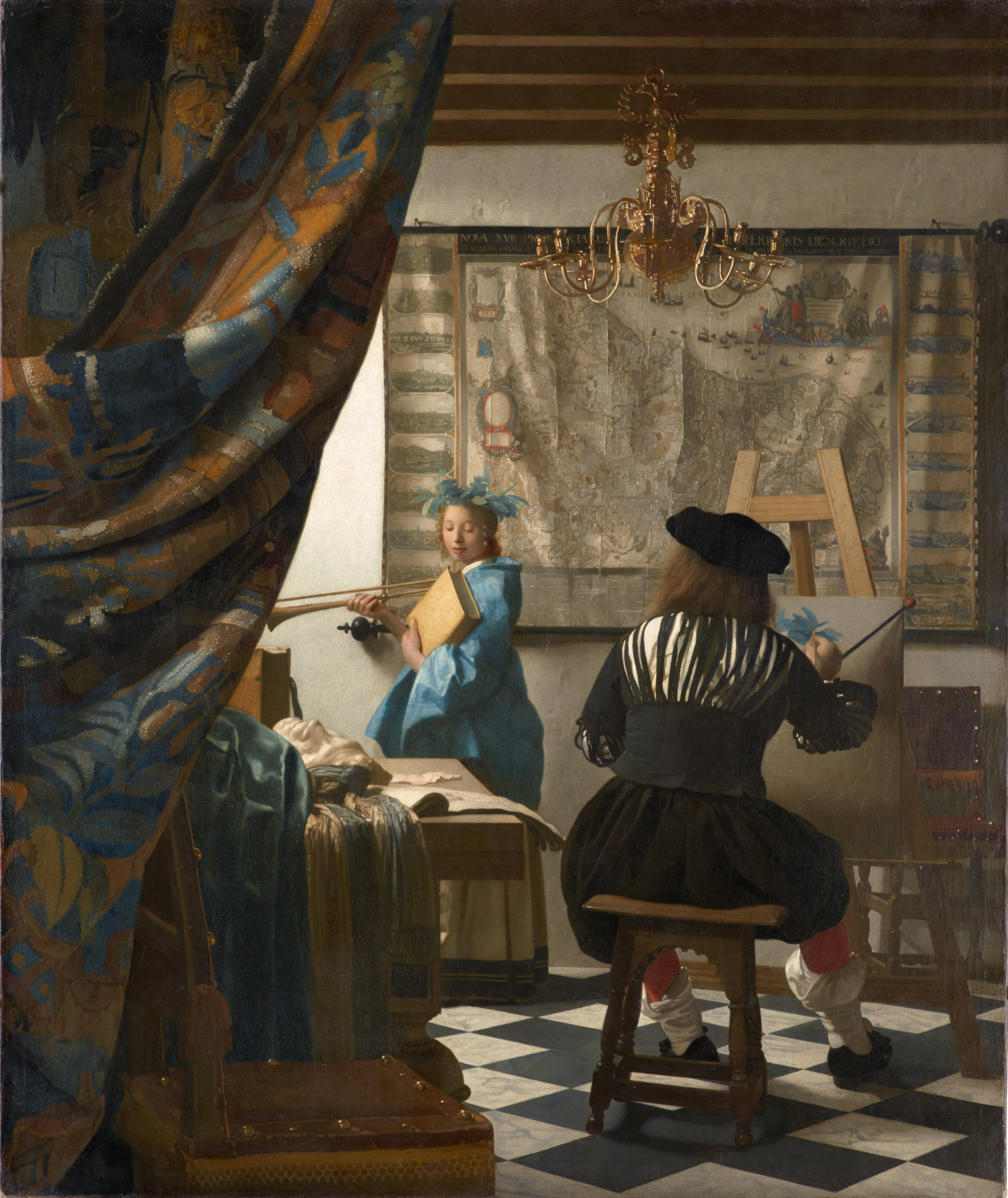
Vermeer's Art of Painting or The Allegory of Painting – one of the inspirations for the film.

A fictional tale woven round the lives of actual historic figures, the television film is a 70-minute-long adaptation of Le Fanu's 1839 gothic tale "Strange Event in the Life of Schalken [sic] the Painter", directed and adapted by Leslie Megahey. When Megahey was offered the opportunity to oversee Omnibus, the BBC’s long-running arts documentary series, he accepted on condition that he could make Schalcken the Painter. He shot the film in the style of a docudrama, using a minimum of dialogue. Megahey has stated that he was influenced in the making of the film by the Polish director Walerian Borowczyk, whose 1971 film Blanche also shows the fate of a young woman being decided by rich men, without consideration of her feelings or opinions.

Like the earlier Whistle and I'll Come to You, Schalcken the Painter was listed as an episode of Omnibus. It aired on 23 December 1979, filling the slot traditionally taken in previous years by the BBC’s A Ghost Story for Christmas.

The actor Vincent Price was initially considered for the Narrator but it was decided his voice would be "too camp", and Peter Cushing turned down the role as being too dark. Finally the actor Charles Gray was cast. Arthur Lowe of Dad's Army fame was considered for the role of Gerrit Dou, but he was unavailable and the role went instead to Maurice Denham.

The sets and atmospheric lighting used in the film are based on the backgrounds of the paintings by Vermeer. Paintings by Schalcken showing young women holding candles in dark rooms are used throughout the drama, but the final image, again showing a young candlelit woman, but this time with a man in the shadowy background drawing his sword, was created for the film, based on the style of Schalcken.

Megahey subsequently used the same narrative device of combining historical figures with the paintings of the lead subject on the 1987 production Cariani and the Courtesans, which Gray also narrated.

== See also ==
- List of ghost films
