= Anthony Vreem =

Dutch painter

Anthony Vreem (1660, Dordrecht – 1681, Dordrecht), was a 17th-century Dutch painter.

== Biography ==
According to Houbraken he was a promising young painter who learned from Godfried Schalcken in the period that Schalcken was studying at the Latin school where Vreem's father was rector. He died young, still a student, and was mourned in the traditional way of young men in Dordrecht at the time, with laurels on his coffin and laurels worn by the coffin bearers. A sad poem was written in his death notice that Houbraken republished.

According to the RKD he was a pupil of Godfried Schalcken and the only paintings known by him are copies after older masters.
