= Carel Isaak de Moor =

Dutch painter

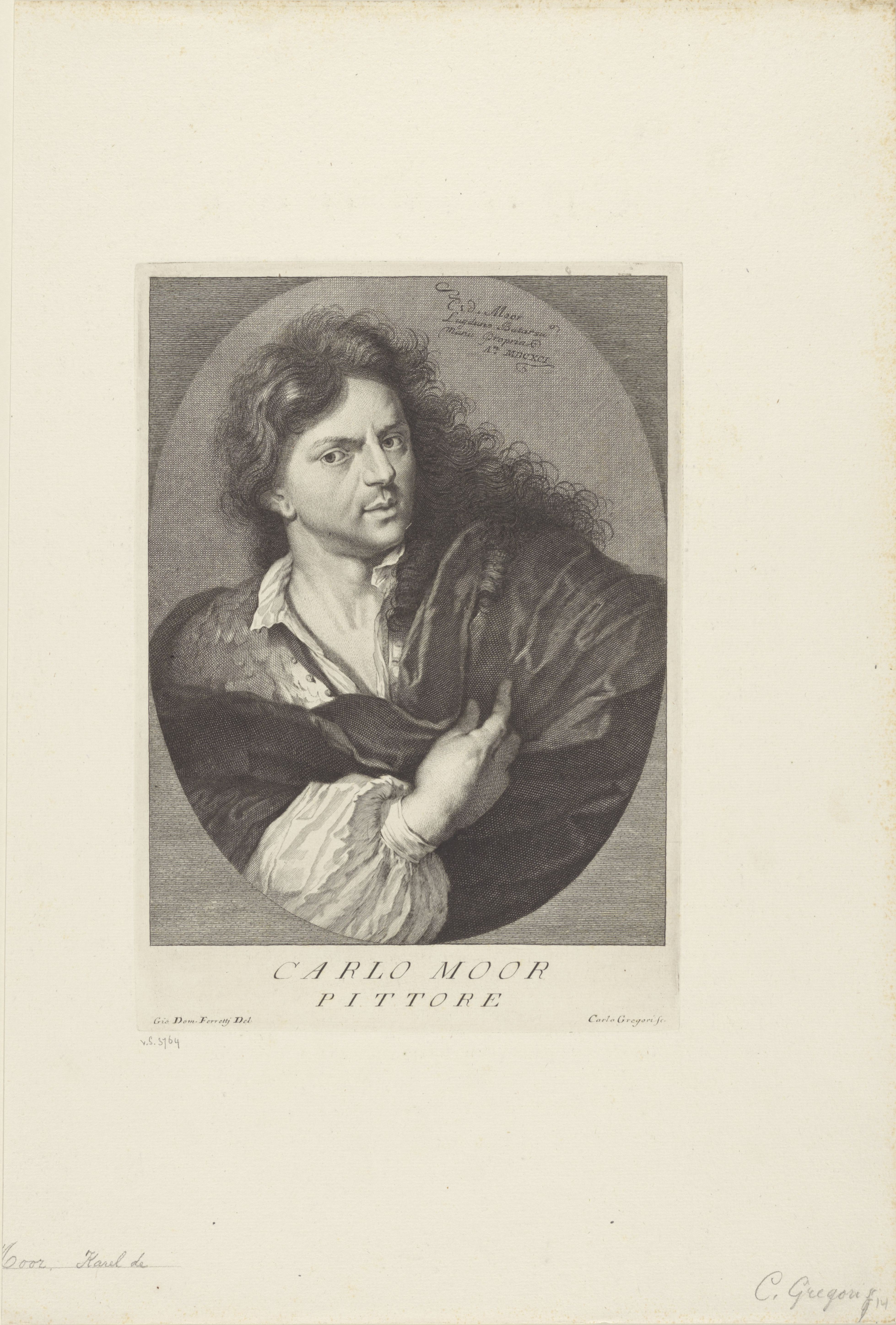
Portrait of Carel de Moor by Carlo Gregori

Carel Isaak de Moor (1695, Leiden – 1751, Rotterdam) was an 18th-century painter from the Dutch Republic.

Carel Isaak de Moor was a pupil of his father, Carel de Moor. Like his father, he also made etchings. He became a teacher himself and taught the anatomy writers Petrus Camper and Johannes le Francq van Berkhey.

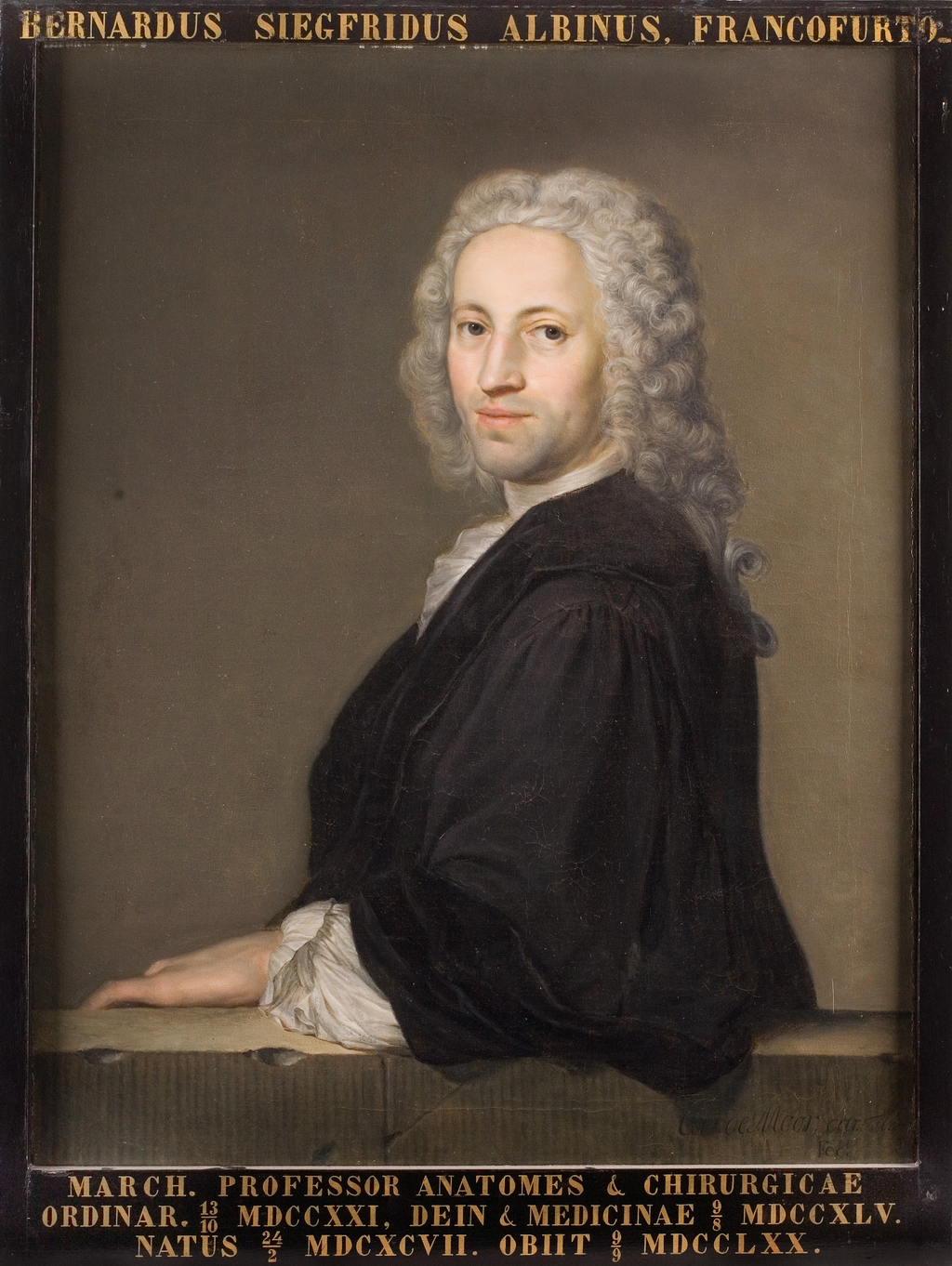
Portrait of Bernhardus Albinus

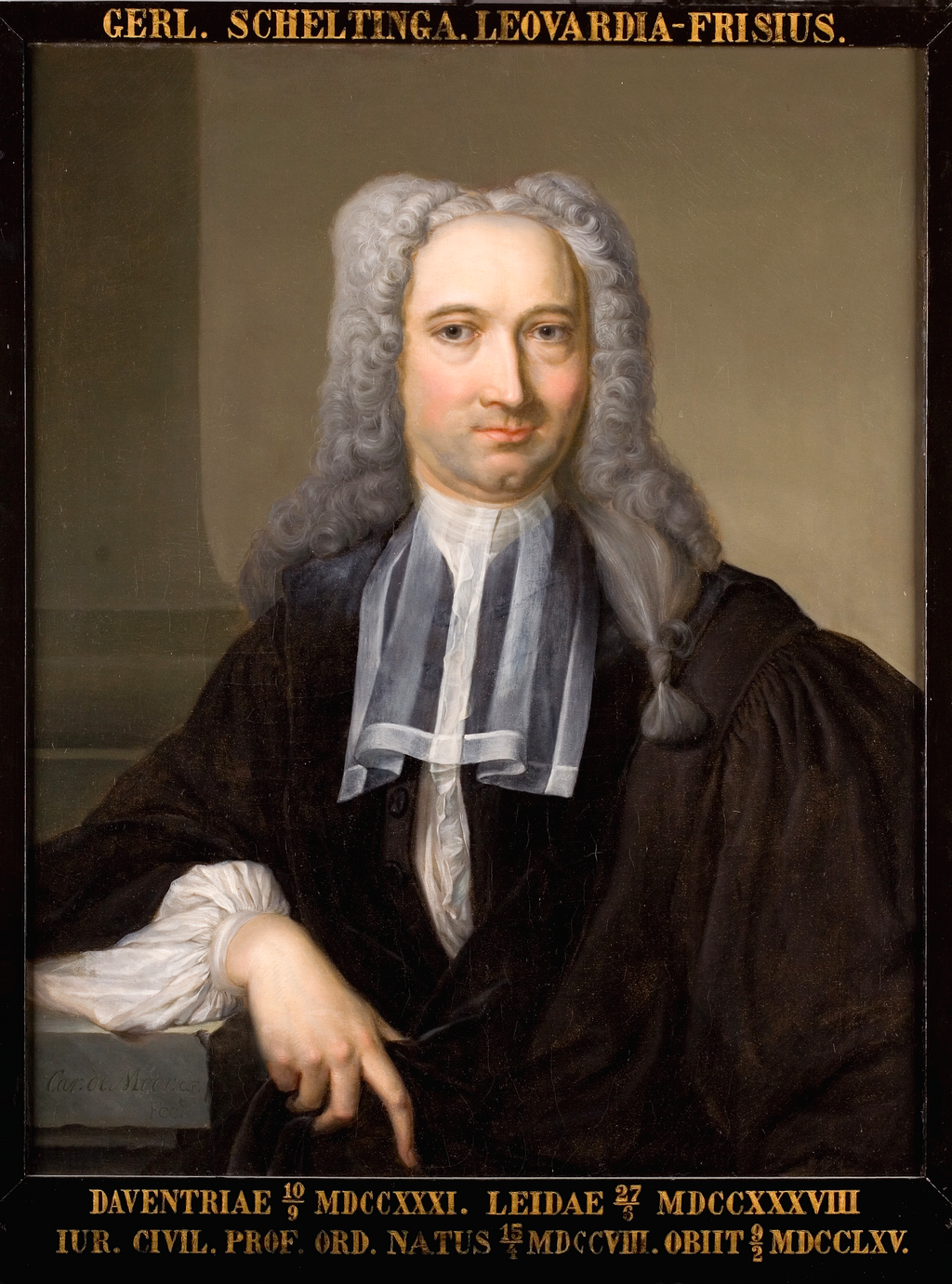
Portrait of Dutch lawyer Gerlach Scheltinga

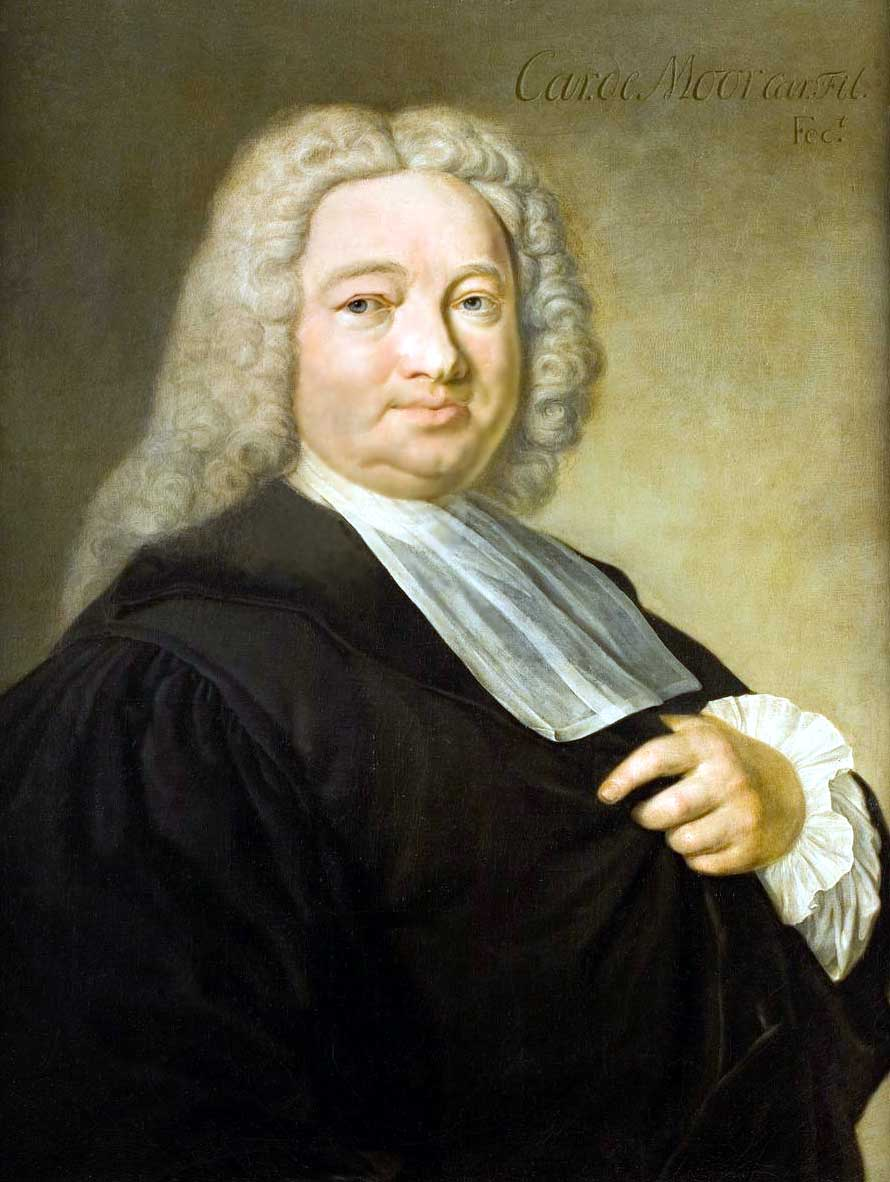
Portrait of Joachim Schwartz
