= Carel de Moor =

Dutch etcher and painter (1655–1738)

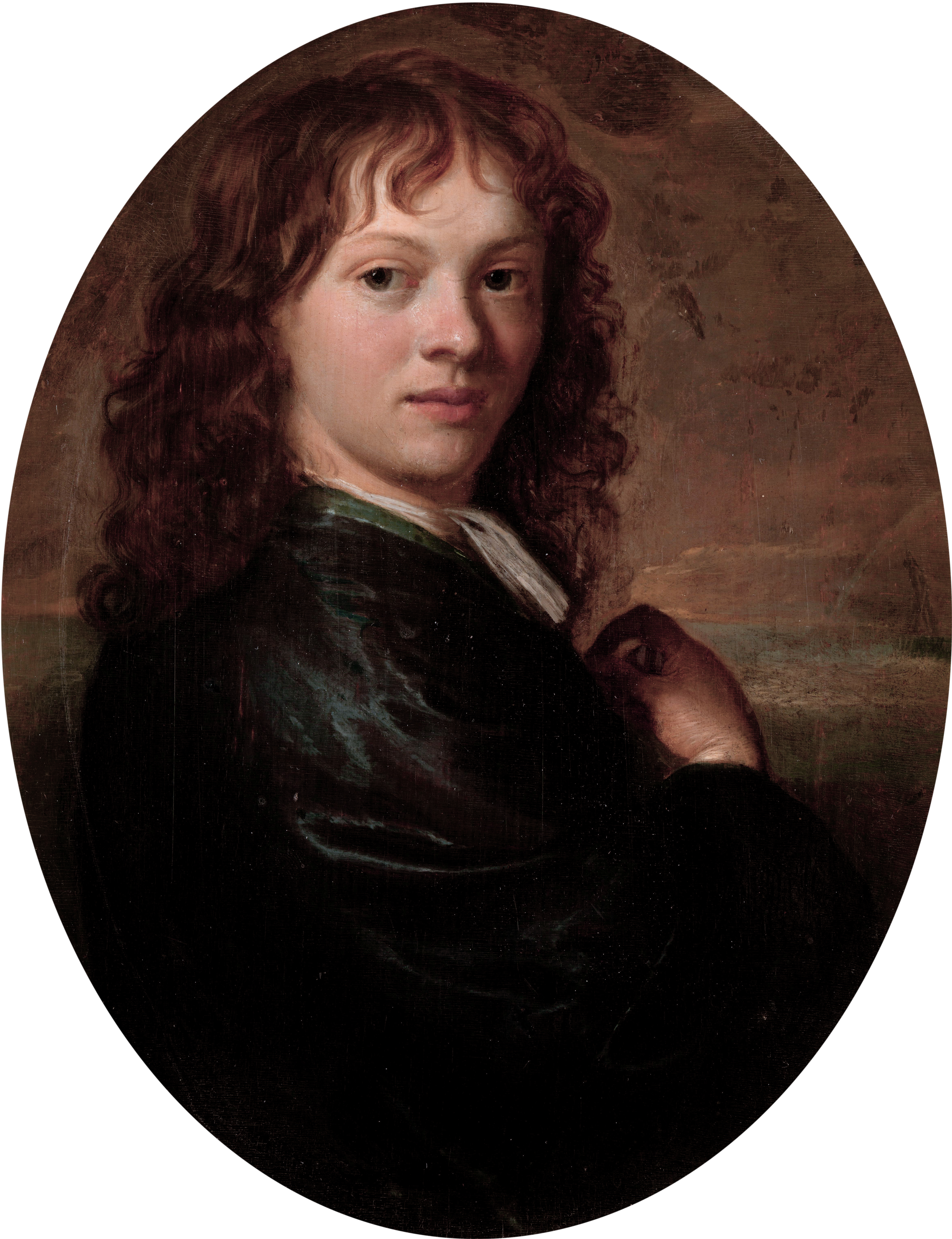
Self-portrait (c. 1675–1680)

Carel de Moor (25 February 1655 – 16 February 1738) was a Dutch Golden Age etcher and painter. He was a pupil of the Dutch Golden Age painter Gerard Dou.

== Biography ==
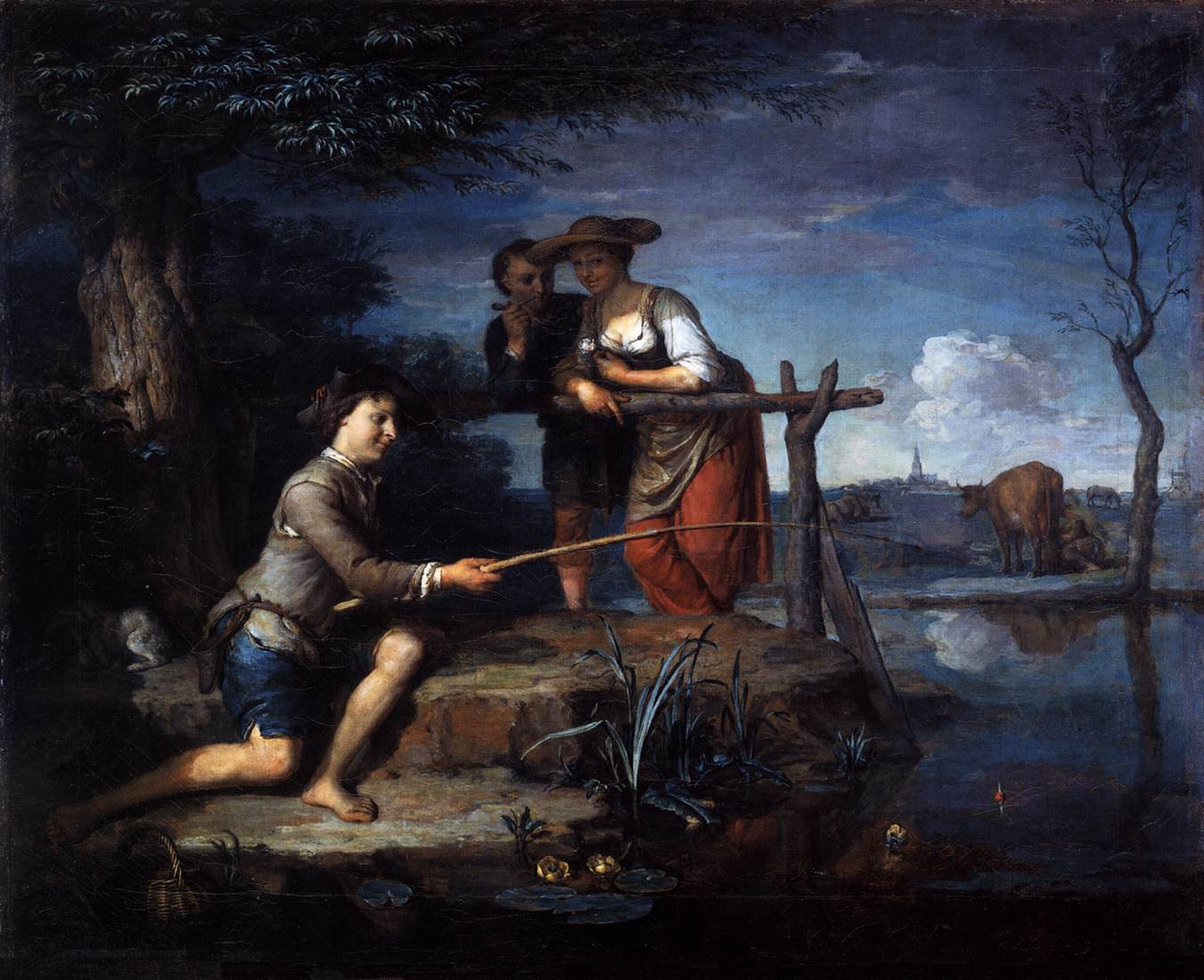
The fisher, ca. 1700

Carel de Moor was born in Leiden. According to Houbraken, his father was an art dealer who wanted him to study languages and only allowed him to study art when his talent for drawing surfaced at a young age. Houbraken met him in person at the atelier of Godfried Schalcken when he was completing his education there. According to the RKD, he was the son of a Leiden painter of the same name and a pupil of Dou, Frans van Mieris, Godfried Schalcken, and Abraham van den Tempel. He became a member of the Leiden Guild of St. Luke in 1683, and became deacon many times over in the years 1688–1711. His own pupils later were Pieter Lyonet, Andrei Matveev, his own son Carel Isaak de Moor, Arent Pijl, Arnout Rentinck, Nicolaas Six and Mattheus Verheyden.

He died in Leiden or Warmond.
