= The Lute Player (Cariani) =

Painting by Giovanni Cariani

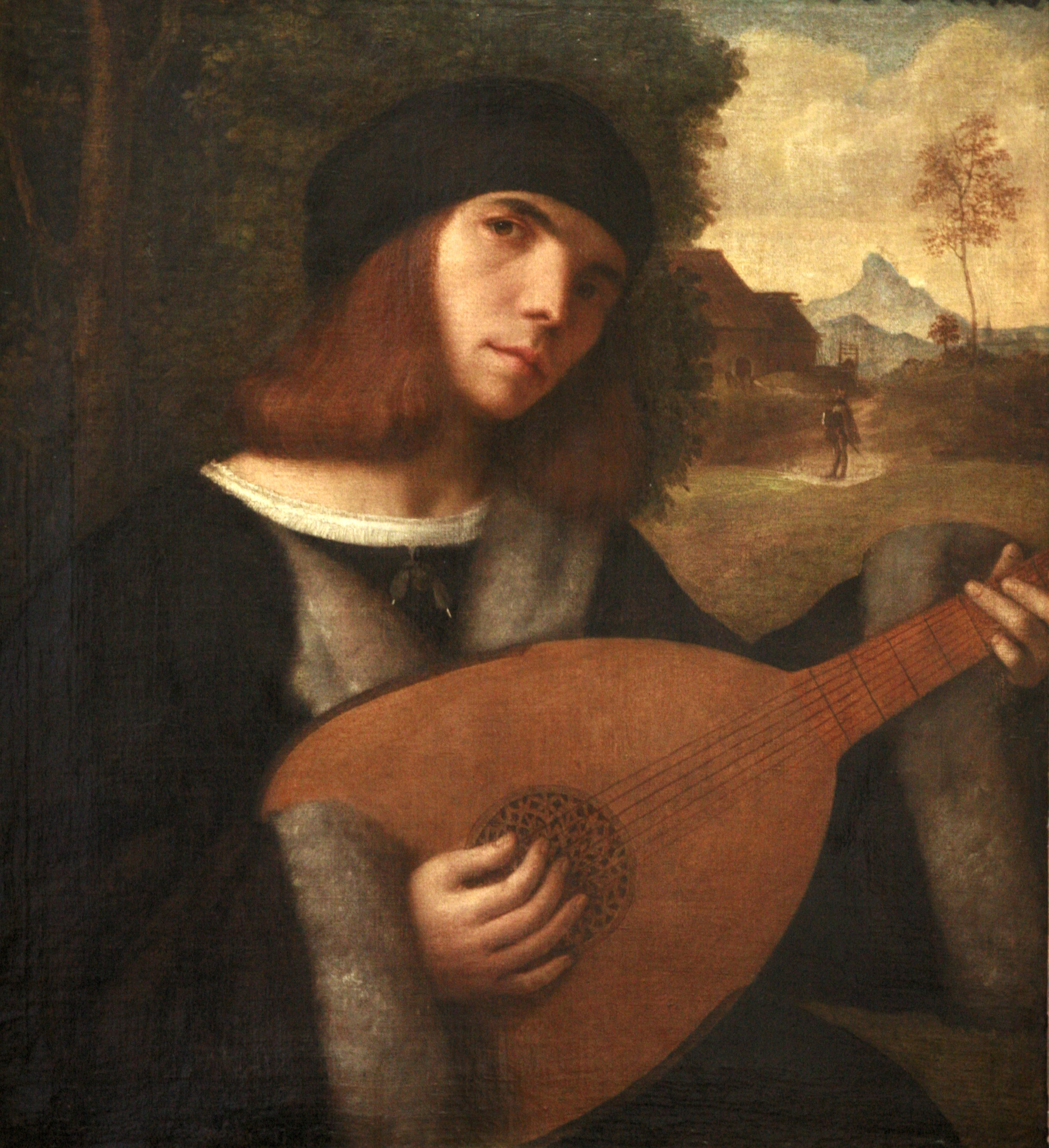
- Artist: Giovanni Cariani
- Year: circa 1515–1516
- Medium: oil on canvas
- Movement: Italian Renaissance; Cinquecento
- Dimensions: 71 cm × 65 cm (28 in × 26 in)
- Location: Musée des Beaux-Arts, Strasbourg
- Accession: 1891

The Lute Player is an oil painting on canvas executed ca. 1514–1516 by the Italian Renaissance painter Giovanni Cariani, now in the Musée des Beaux-Arts in Strasbourg, France. Its inventory number is 236.

== History ==
In 1899 Adolfo Venturi adjudged the work to be "too high quality to be by Cariani", but Wilhelm von Bode attributed it to Cariani. Bode acquired it from a private Venetian collection in 1890; it entered the Strasbourg museum the following year. Since then it has also been attributed to Giorgione or in 1932 by some art historians to Palma il Vecchio, but is now seen as sharing all the basic characteristics of works securely attributed to Cariani.
