= Godfried Schalcken =

Dutch painter (1643–1706)

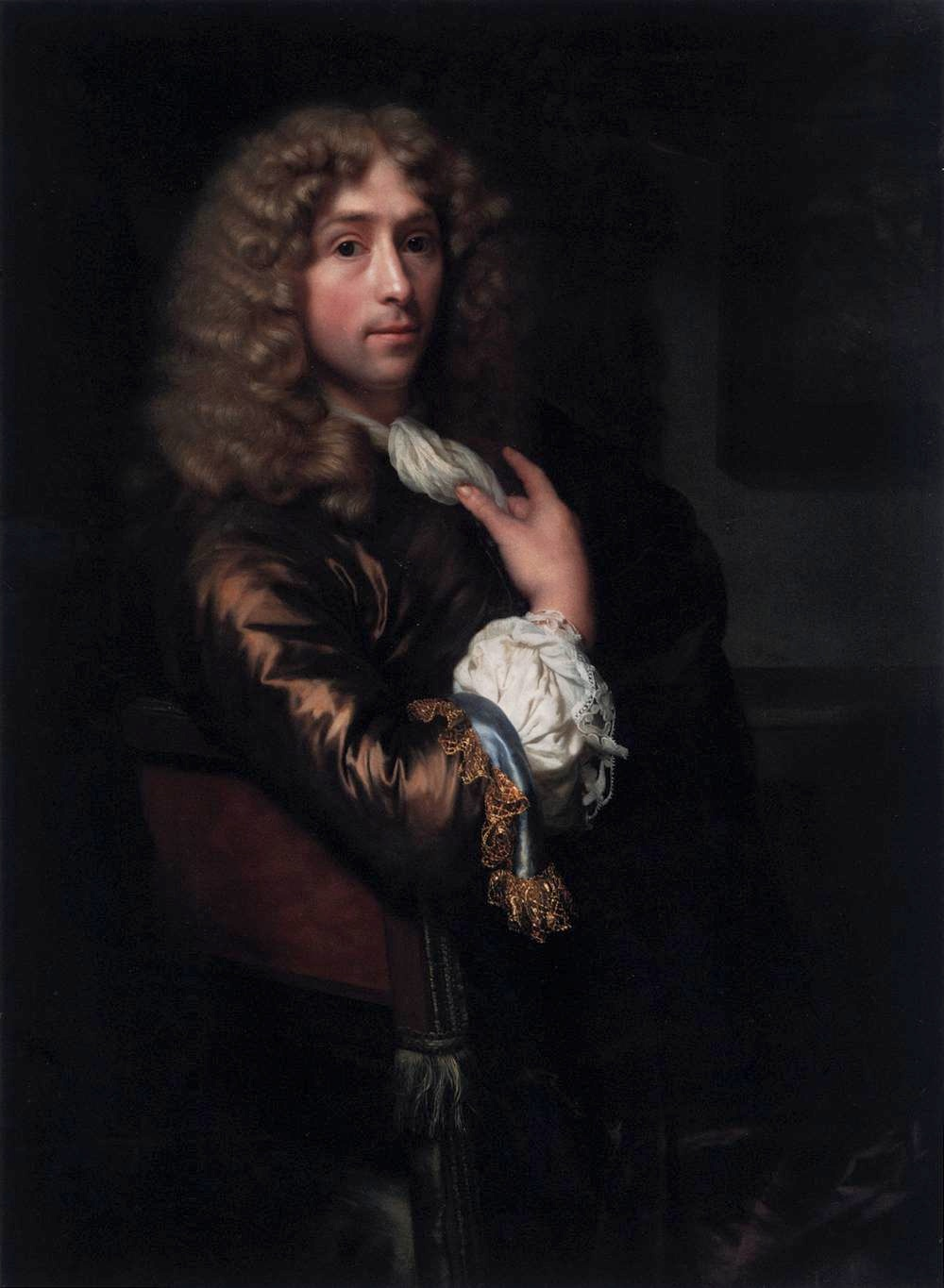
- Self-portrait, 1679
- Born: 8 October 1643; Made
- Died: 16 November 1706; The Hague
- Known for: Painting, Portrait painting

Godfried Schalcken (8 October 1643 – 16 November 1706) was a Dutch artist who specialized in genre paintings and portraits. Schalcken was noted for his night scenes and mastery in reproducing the effect of candlelight. He painted in the highly polished style of the Leiden fijnschilders.

== Life and work ==
Godfried Schalcken was born in Made, North Brabant, the son of Cornelis Schalcken and Aletta Lydius. Before he was four years old, his family moved to Dordrecht, where his father became rector of the Latin school. Schalcken studied under Samuel van Hoogstraten in Dordrecht before he moved to Leiden, into the studio of Gerard Dou (1613–1675), one of Rembrandt's most famous pupils. His earlier genre pictures very closely resemble Dou's work. He worked in Leiden until c. 1675, then returning to Dordrecht until 1691, after which he settled in The Hague, where he continued to paint until his death in 1706. He also visited England (1692–1697), but his uncouth manners and bad temper alienated him from the society there. In 1703 he was employed by Johann Wilhelm, Elector Palatine in Düsseldorf. He died in The Hague.

== Work ==
Schalcken painted several portraits, of which the half-length of William III of England, now in the Rijksmuseum, Amsterdam, is a good example.

Like Dou, Schalcken specialized in small scenes lit by candlelight, a format favored by the Leiden fijnschilders. Examples are in Buckingham Palace, the Louvre, Vienna and Dresden.

His painting, Lady, Come into the Garden (Buckingham Palace), was singled out by Schalcken's pupil and Dutch artistic biographer Arnold Houbraken as representative of his oeuvre. Other good examples are Old Woman Scouring a Pan and Soldier Giving Money to a Woman (London, National Gallery), Ceres Seeking Proserpine and Old Man Writing (Louvre), Woman (National Museum of Serbia), Girl Blowing Out Taper (Munich), Girl Reading Letter (Dresden Gallery), The Boy Angling (Berlin); and Toilet by Candle (The Hague). The Buckingham Palace collection also possesses an interior by Schalcken. His history paintings are less-well known. His pupils were Arnold Boonen, Godefridus Callenfels, Simon Germain, Carel de Moor, Richard Morris, Arent Pijl, his cousin Jacob Schalcken, his sister Maria Schalcken, and Anthony Vreem.

Godfried Schalcken

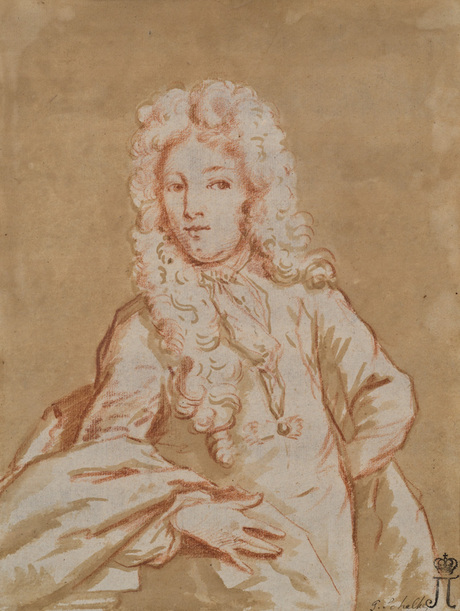
Portrait of a man

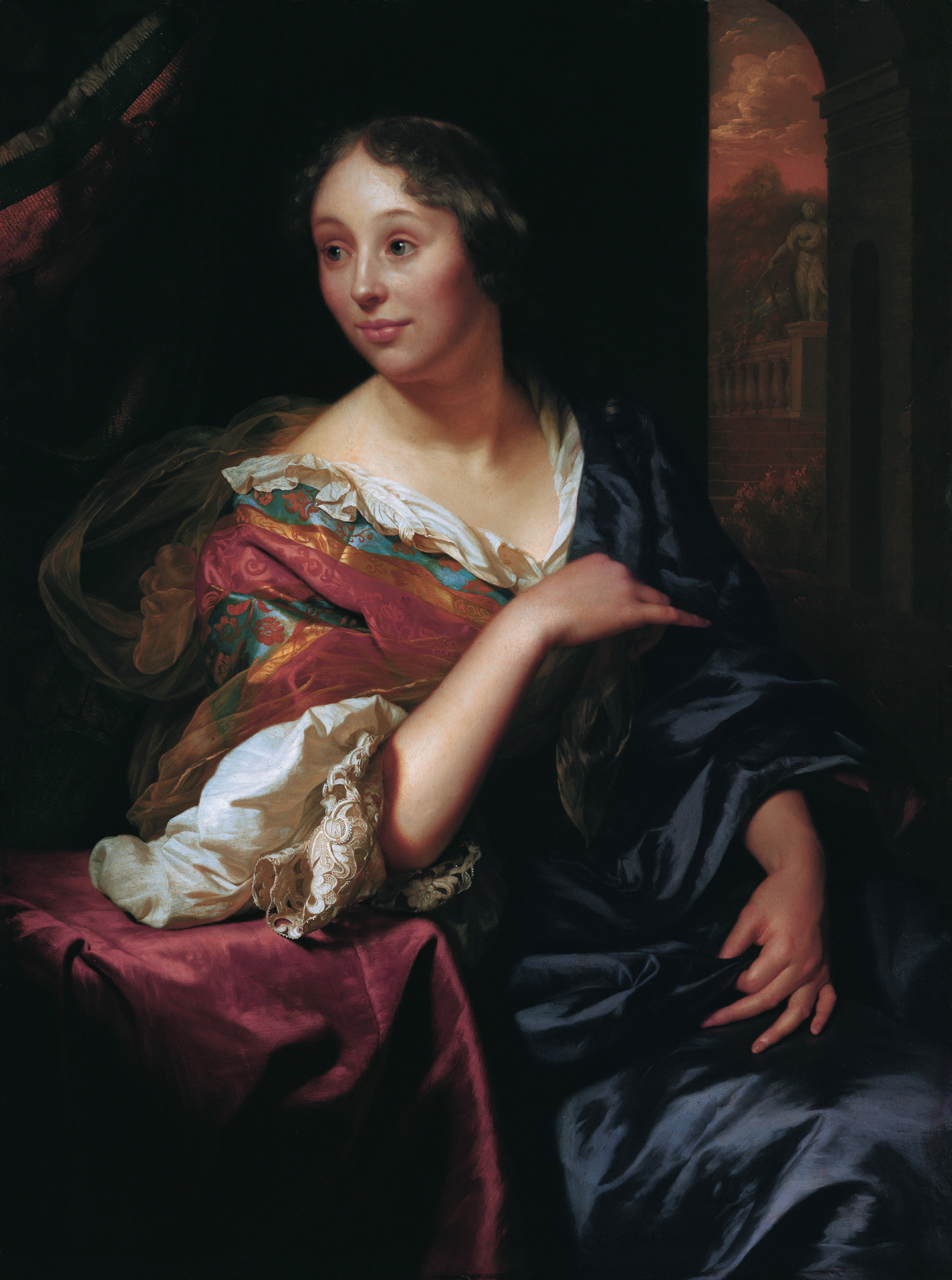
Portrait of Françoise van Diemen, his wife, in 1679 (marriage pendant to his selfportrait)

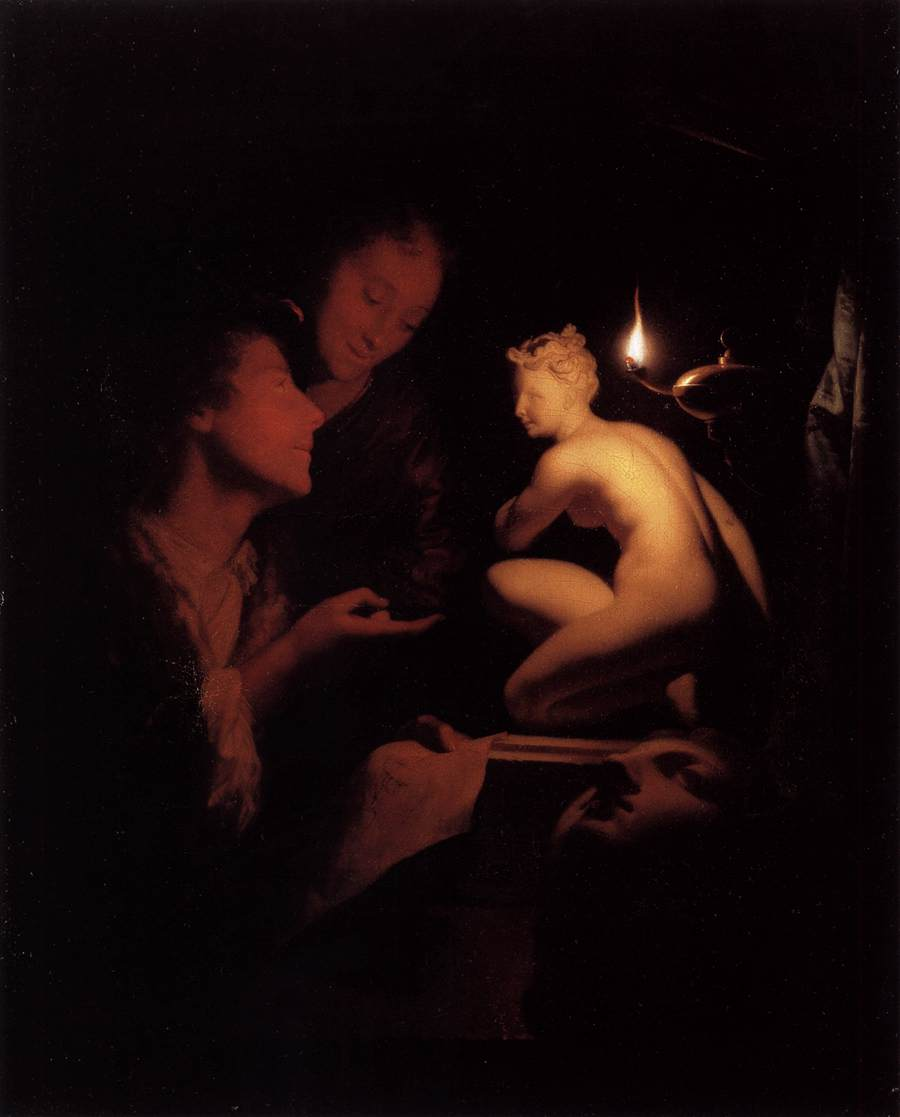
Artist and Model Looking at an Ancient Statue by Lamplight

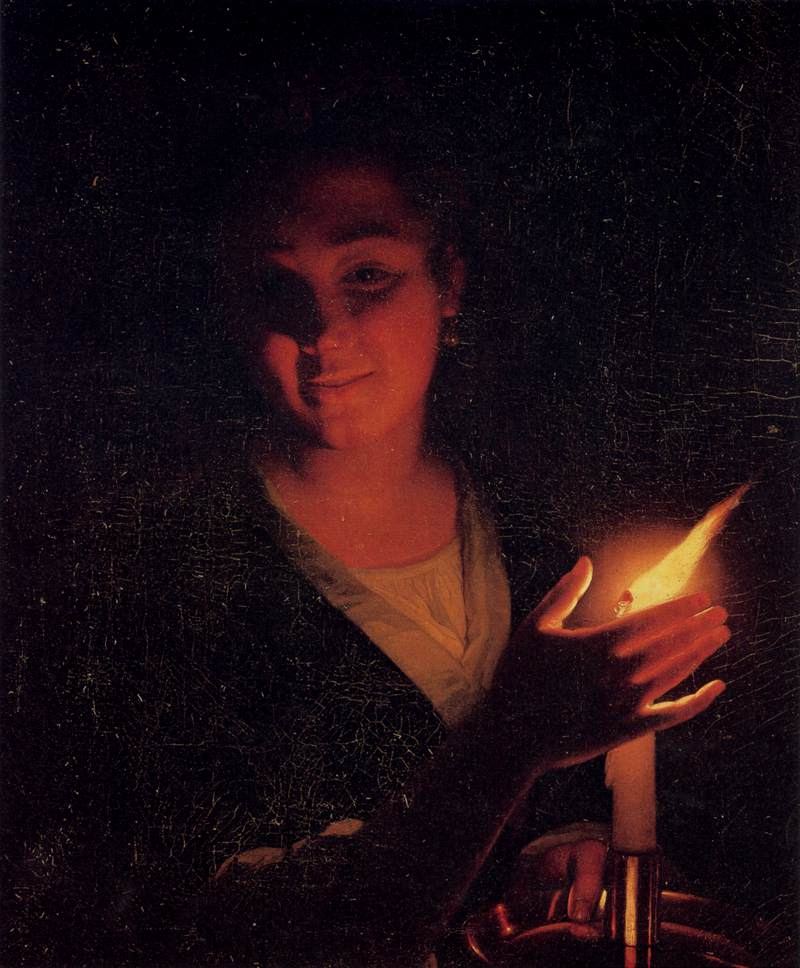
Young Girl with a Candle

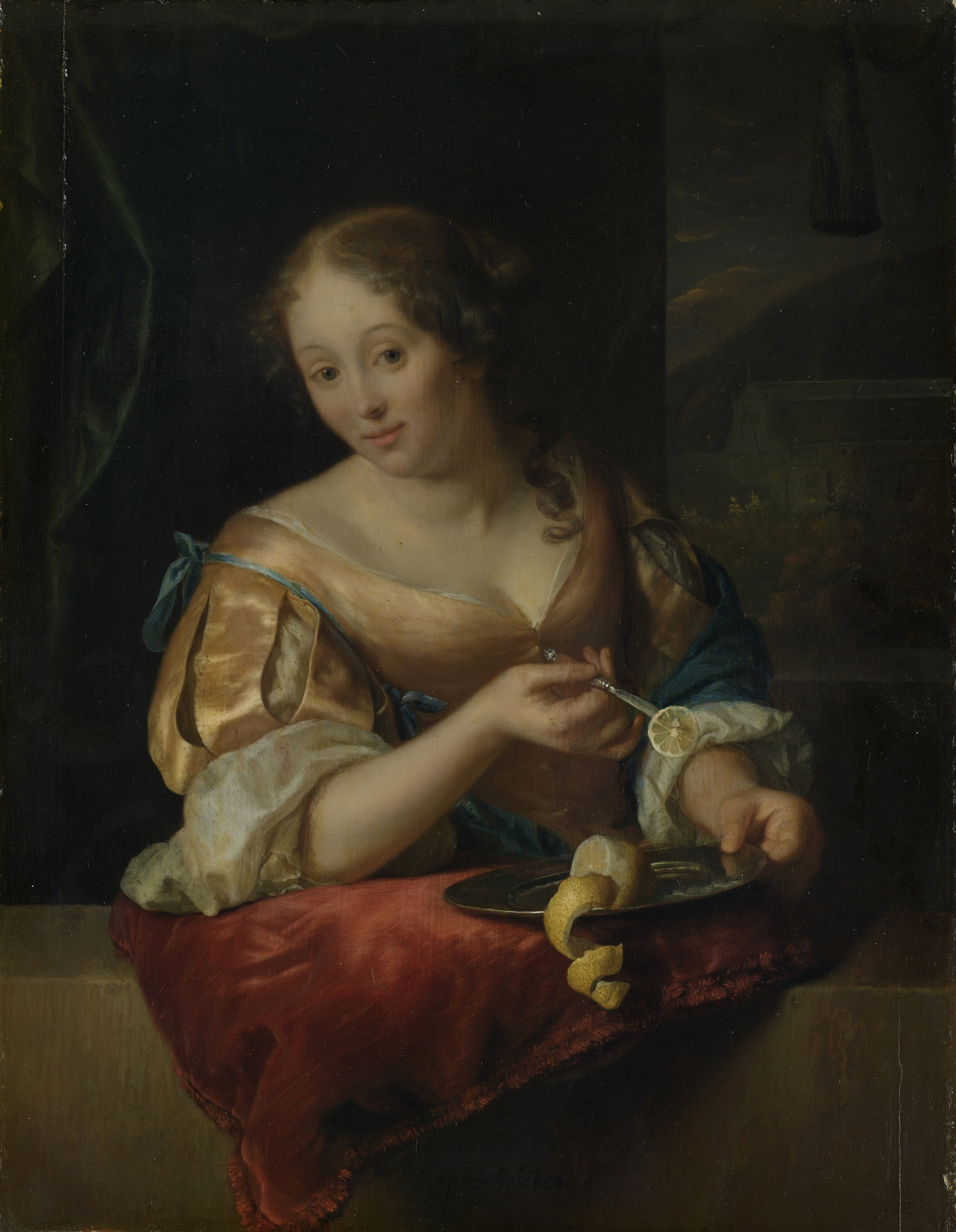
Young Girl with lemon

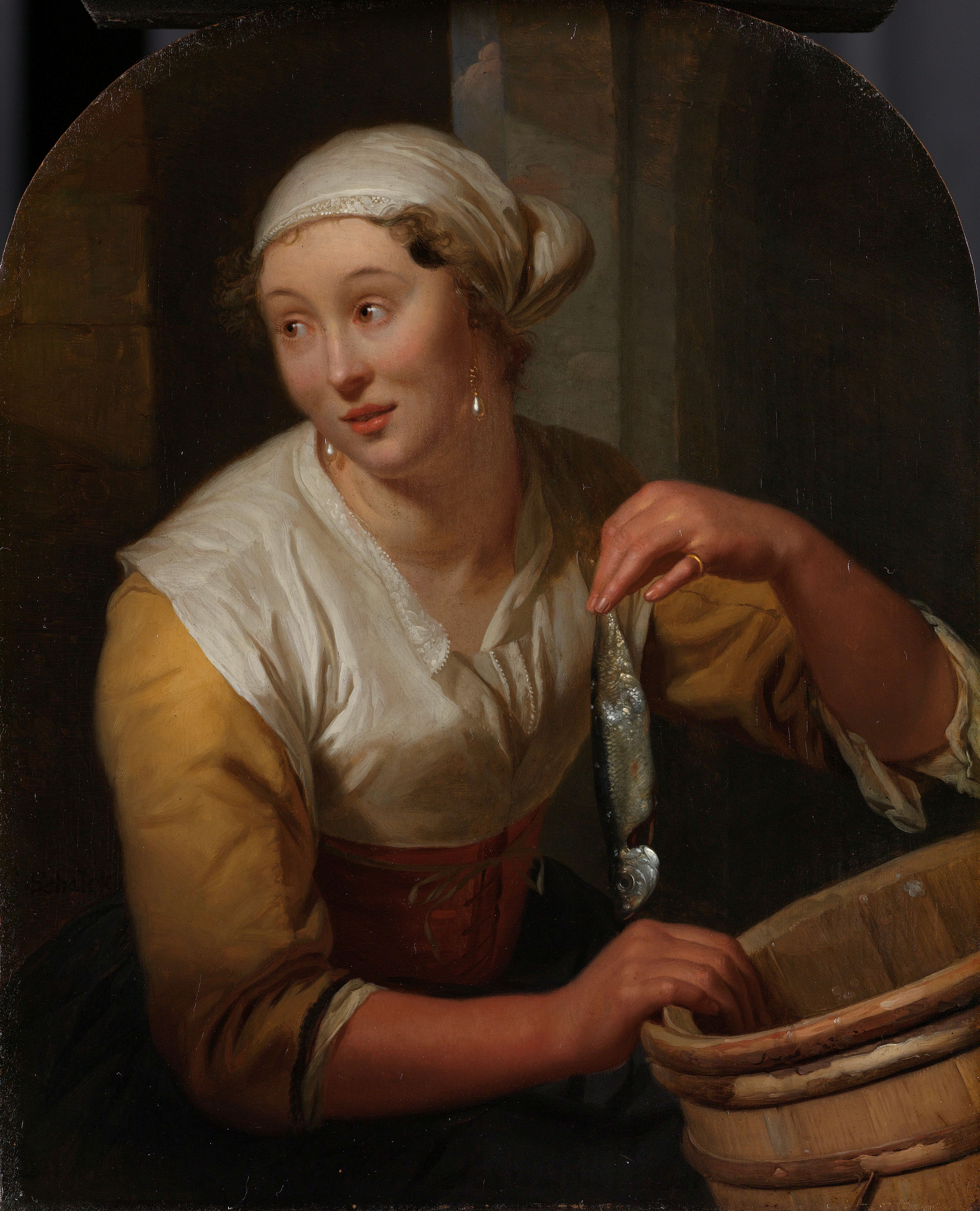
Young Girl with a Fish

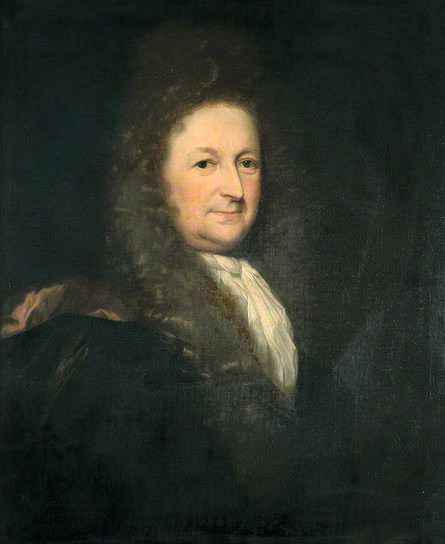
Portrait of Sir Richard Levett, Lord Mayor of London, 1699.

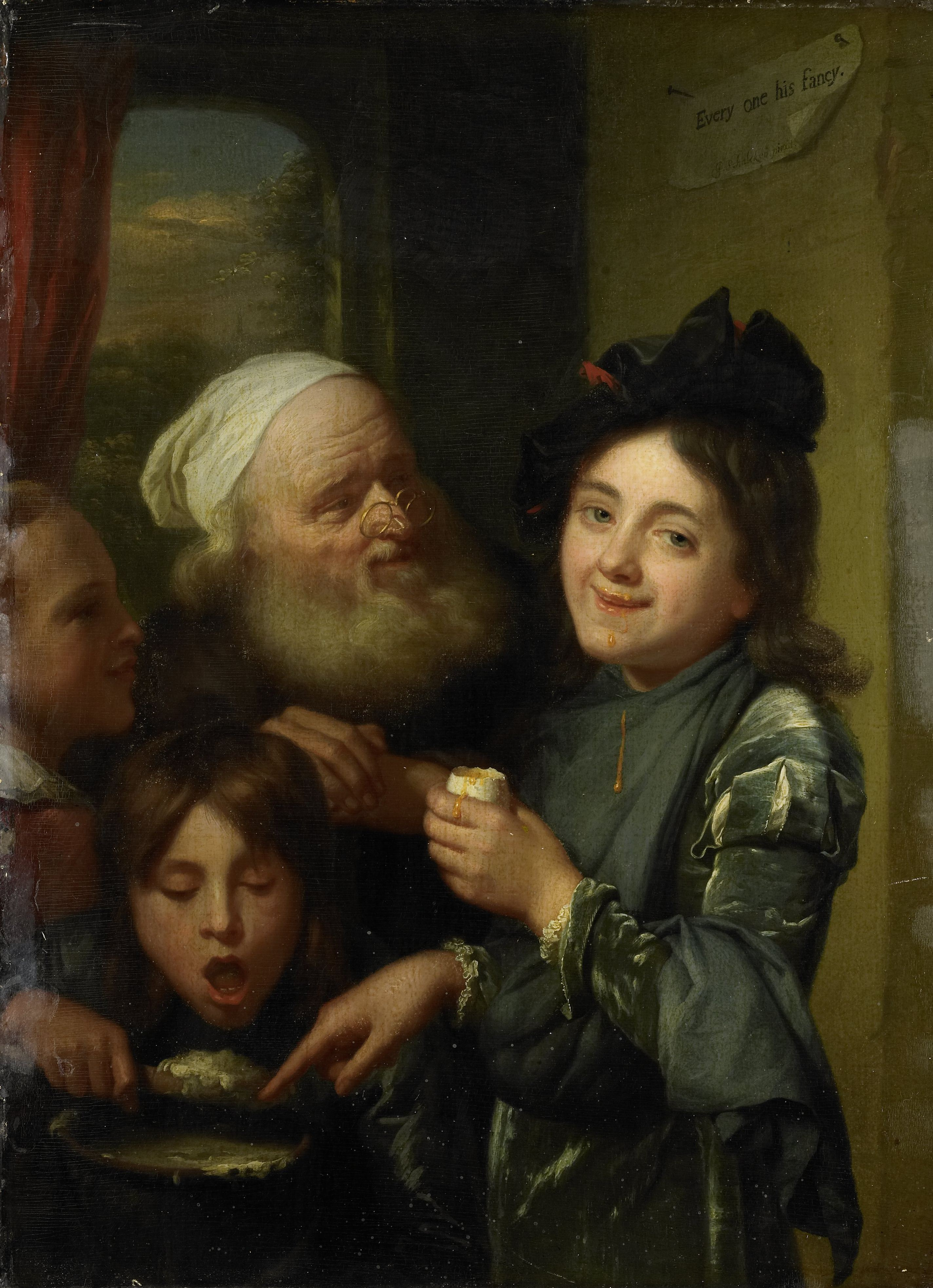
Every One His Fancy c. 1670–1675. Rijksmuseum Amsterdam

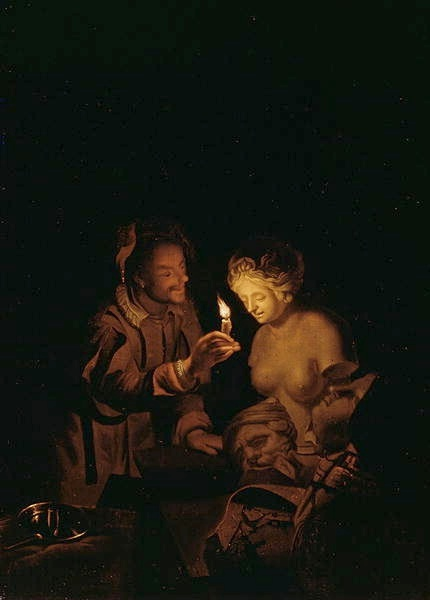
Pygmalion

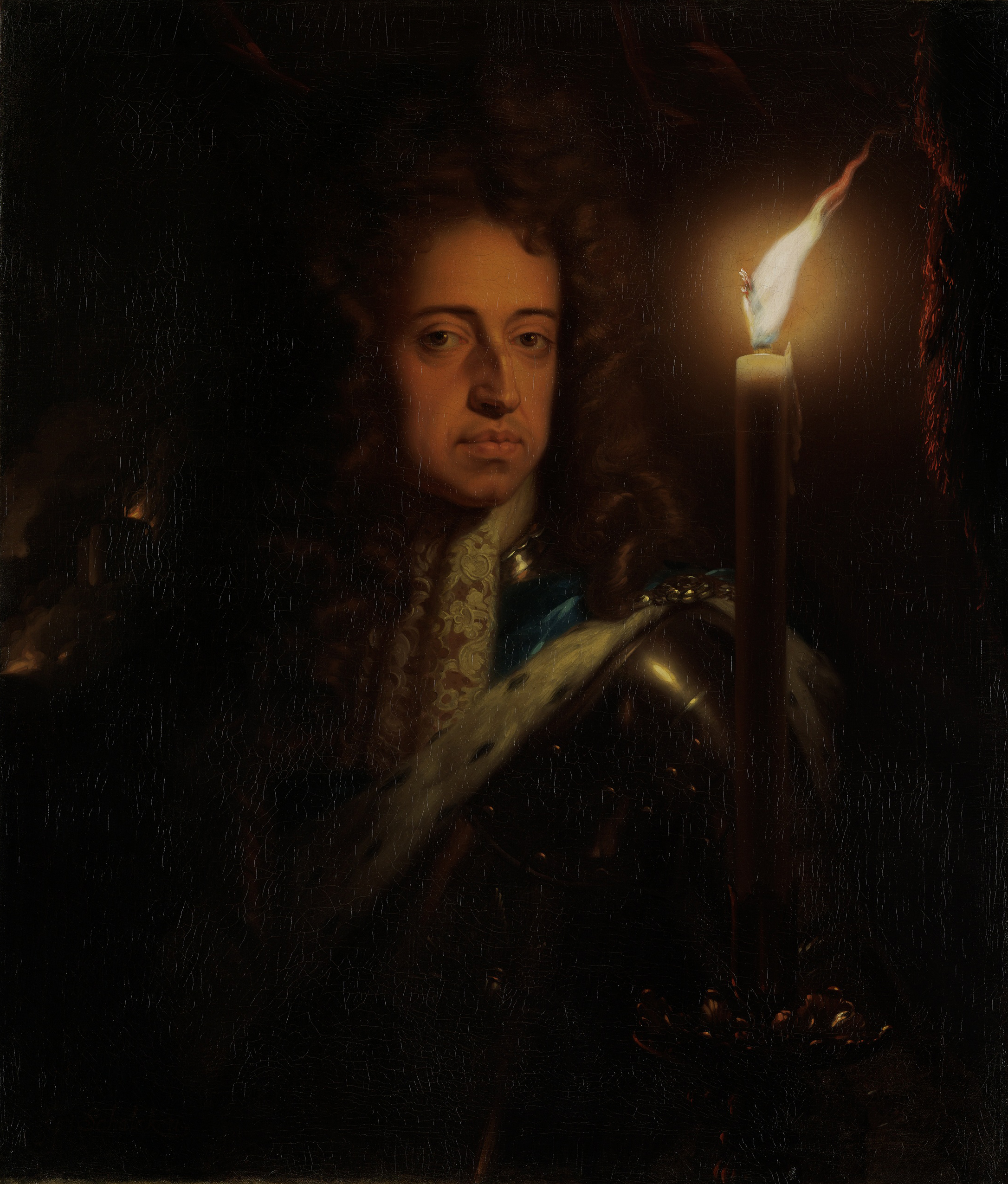
William III of England

== In literature ==
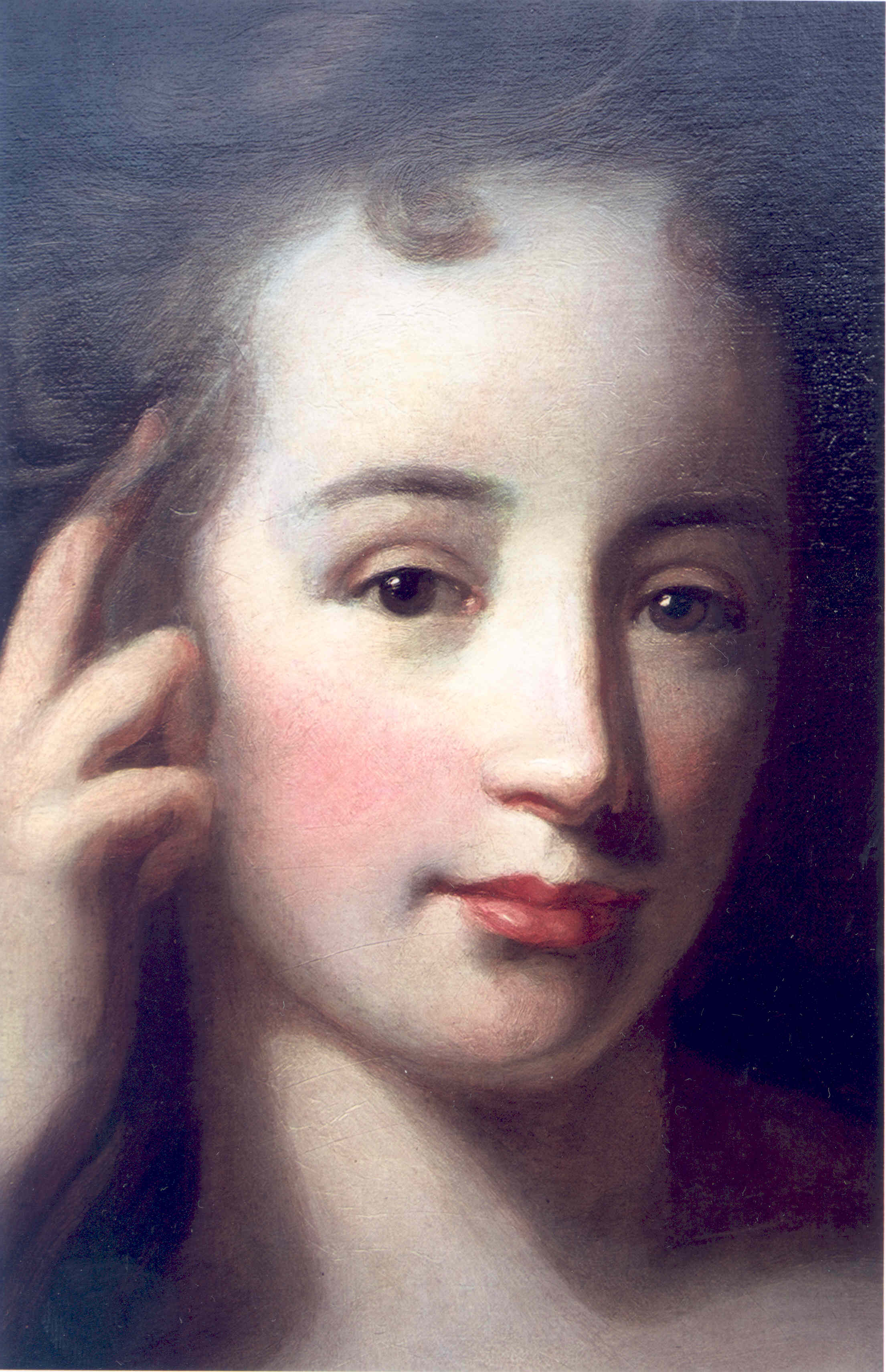
Mary Stanhope, later Viscountess Fane, detail of a portrait signed and dated Schalken, 1702. The prime version of this painting is at Chevening, her brother, James Stanhope's house in Kent.

The atmospheric work of Schalcken provided the inspiration for Sheridan Le Fanu's gothic horror story "Strange Event in the Life of Schalken the Painter", which was adapted as Schalcken the Painter, and broadcast by the BBC on 23 December 1979 as part of its Omnibus series.
