= Giovanni Cariani =

Italian painter (c. 1490–1547)

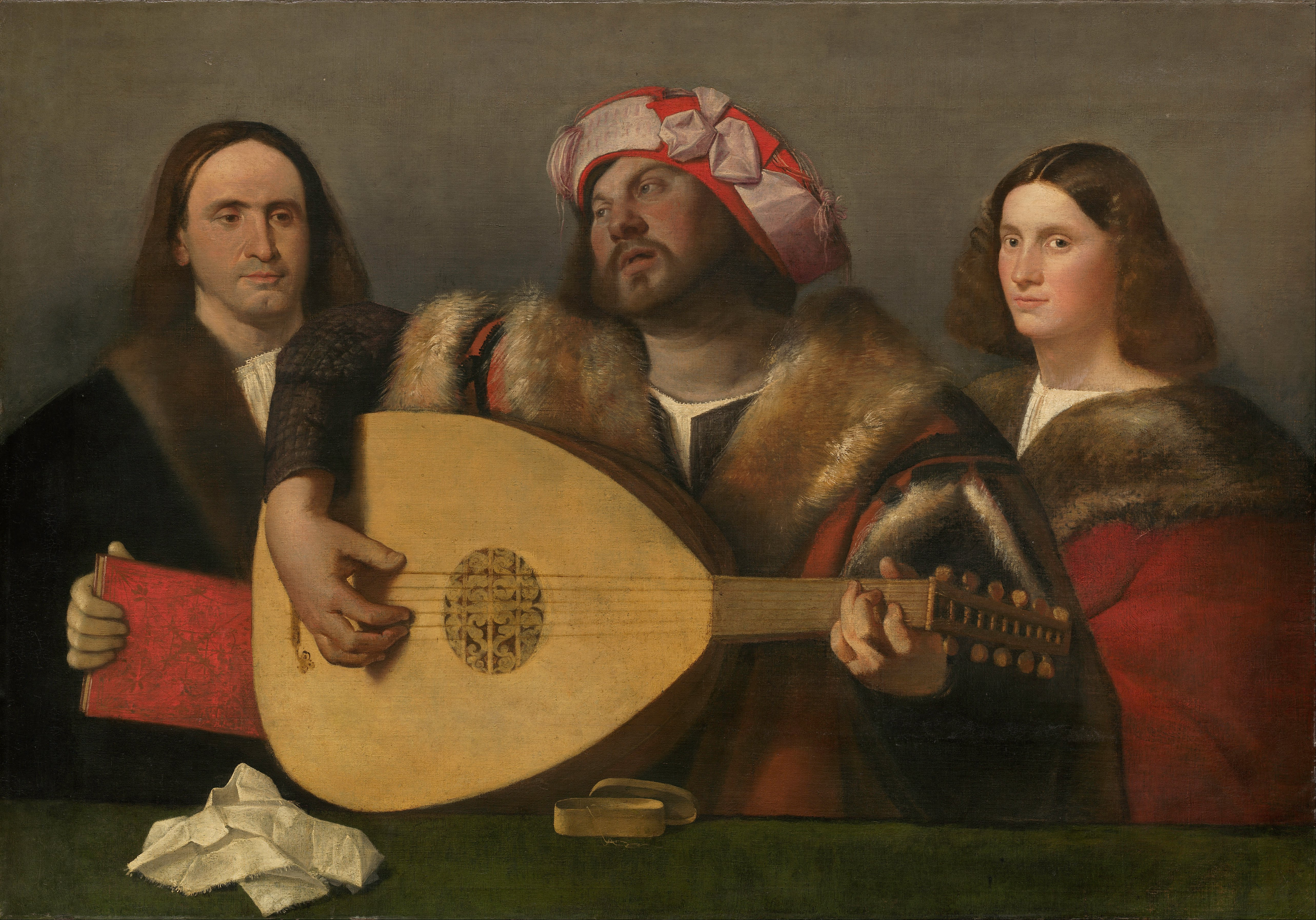
Giovanni Cariani, A Concert, oil on canvas, 92 x 130 cm, c. 1518–1520. National Gallery of Art, Washington, DC

Giovanni Cariani (c. 1490–1547), also known as Giovanni Busi or Il Cariani, was an Italian painter of the high-Renaissance, active in Venice and the Venetian mainland, including Bergamo, thought to be his native city.

== Overview ==
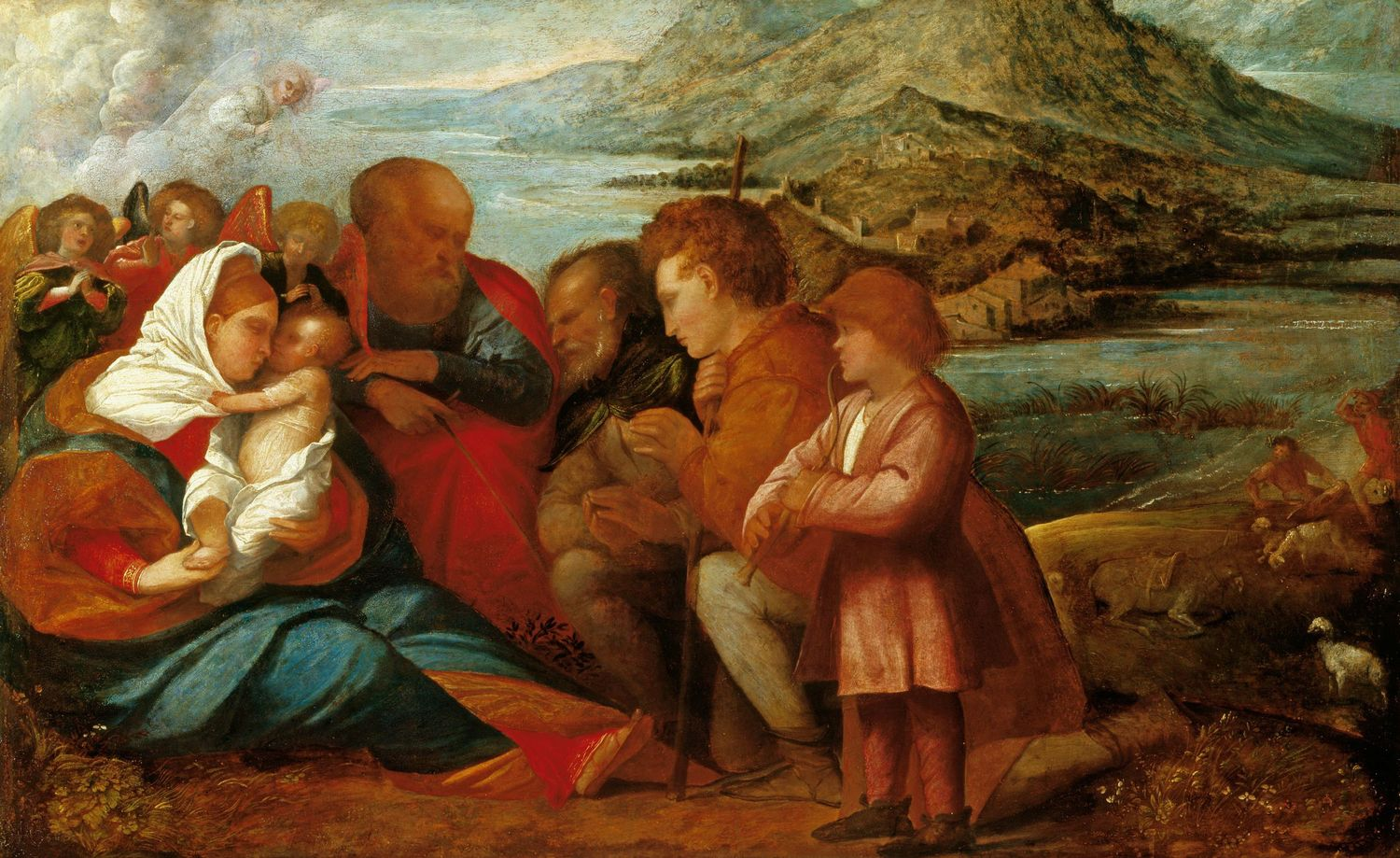
Adoration of the Shepherds, an early work of c. 1515–1517, Royal Collection

His father, also Giovanni Busi, was born in Fuipiano Al Brembo which is a hamlet of San Giovanni Bianco (Bergamo), and was appointed a local magistrate for the Venetian authorities. His son, also born in Fuipiano Al Brembo, is known to have lived in Venice starting in 1509, and may have trained with either Giovanni Bellini or Giorgione, and almost certainly was influenced by them. Though he worked often in Bergamo, he died in Venice in 1547. He was strongly influenced by Palma il Vecchio, but had a provincial love of scenery as seen in his Sacra conversazione with a youthful donor. While working in Bergamo (1517–1523), he likely overlapped with Lorenzo Lotto, who worked there from 1513 to 1525.

== Cariani and the Courtesans ==
The 1987 BBC Two television play Cariani and the Courtesans, written and directed by Leslie Megahey, presented a fictionalised account of the painter's time in Venice, with Cariani (Paul McGann) interacting with other historical characters, such as Tullia d'Aragona (Diana Quick), Marcantonio Raimondi (Simon Callow), and Francesco Albani (Michael Gough), with a brief "cameo" by Albrecht Dürer (Frederik de Groot), and narrated by Charles Gray. The narrative is woven around the painting of a number of his works, principally Four Courtesans and Three Gentlemen. Megahey had previously used the same narrative device on the 1979 production Schalcken the Painter.

== Partial anthology of works ==
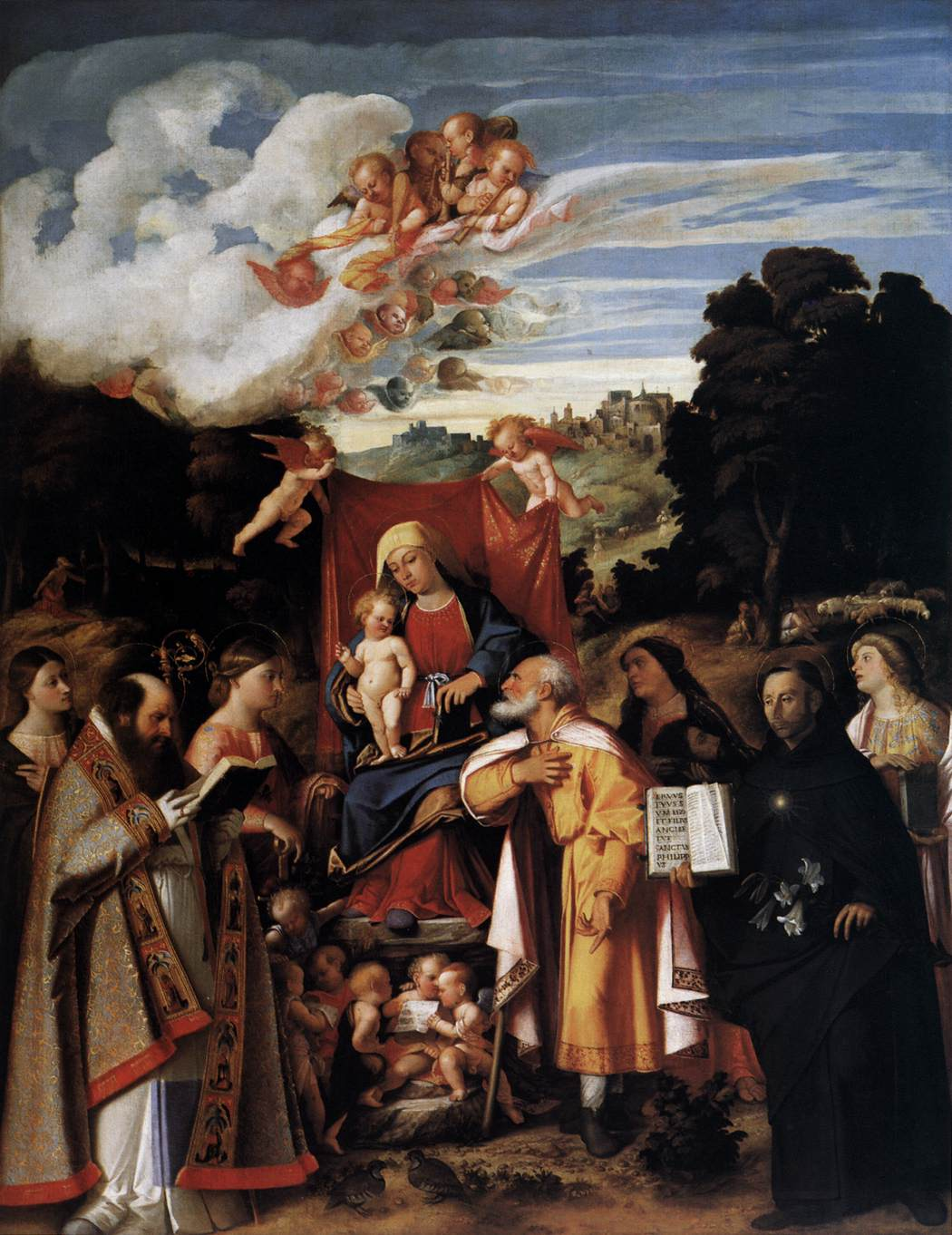
Virgin Enthroned with Angels and Saints, an example of sacra conversazione

- The Lute Player (c. 1514–1516) - Musee des Beaux Arts de Strasbourg
- Conversation between young woman and old man (1516) - Hermitage Museum, St. Petersburg..
- Resurrection of Christ with two Donors (1520) - Pinacoteca di Brera, Milan.
- Pala di San Gottardo (1523) - Pinacoteca di Brera, Milan.
- Madonna Cucitrice (1525–1528) - Galleria Nazionale d'Arte Antica, Rome.
- Finding the True Cross (1530) - Accademia Carrara, Bergamo.
- Lovers in a Landscape (1530) - Palazzo Venezia
- Lady Portrait (1530) - White Palace, Belgrade
- A Concert (1518–1520) - National Gallery of Art, Washington DC
- Sacra Conversazione with a Youthful Donor (1640) - National Gallery, London
- Saint Agata (1516) - National Gallery, Ottawa, Canada.
- Portrait (1517) - National Gallery, London .

== Selected works ==
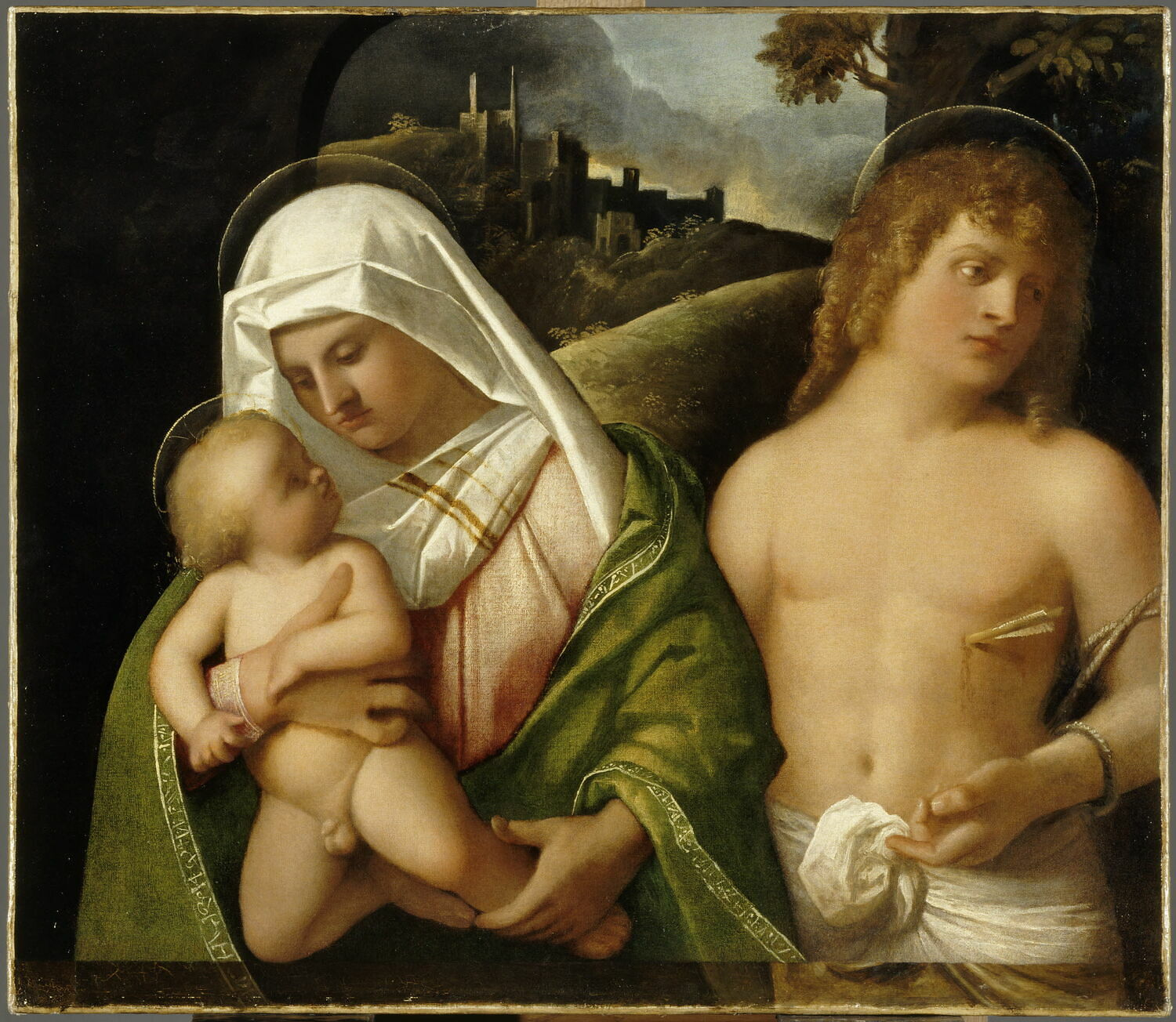
Madonna and Child with St. Sebastian, 1519

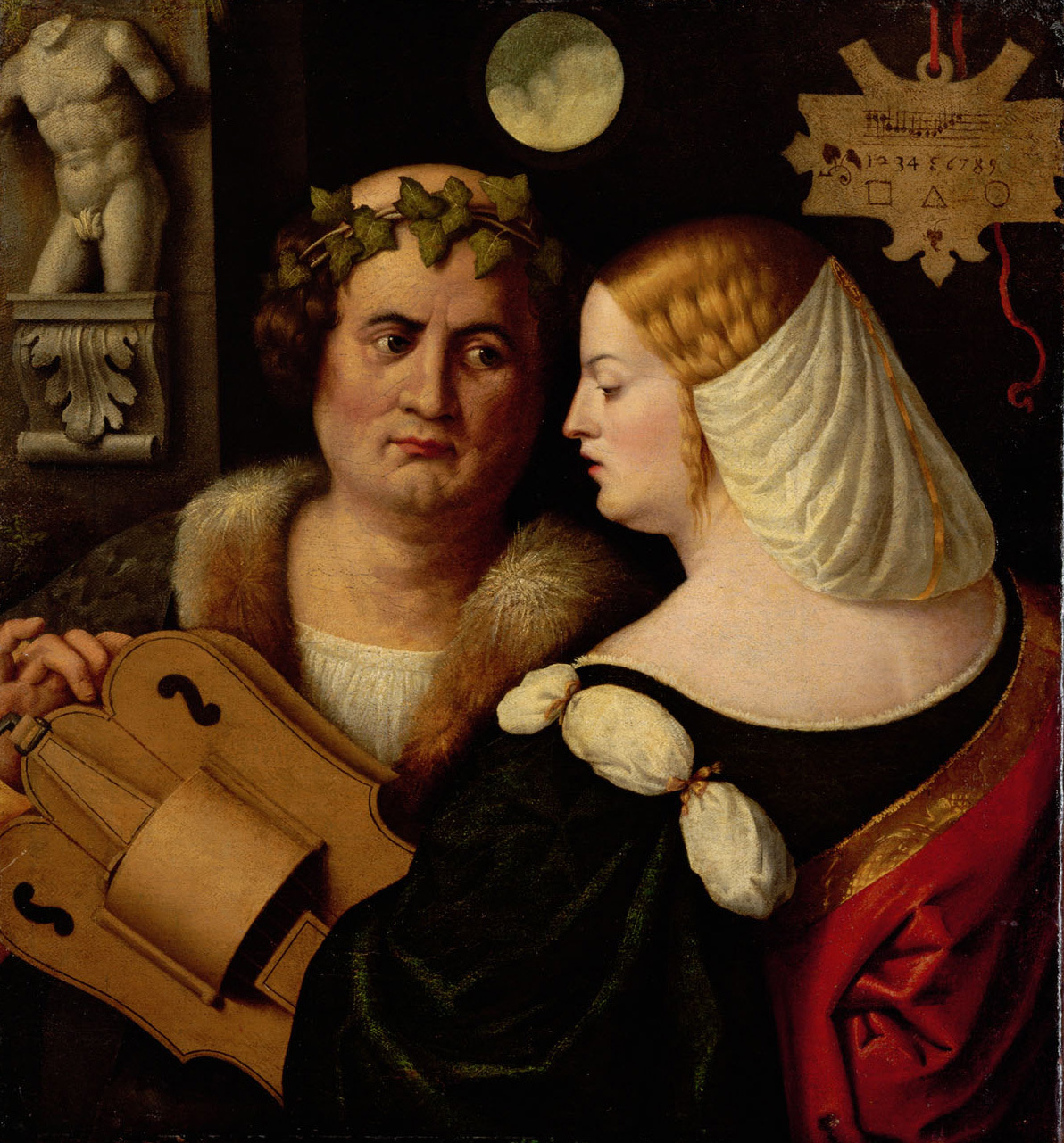
Poet playing the hurdy-gurdy with young woman, 1520

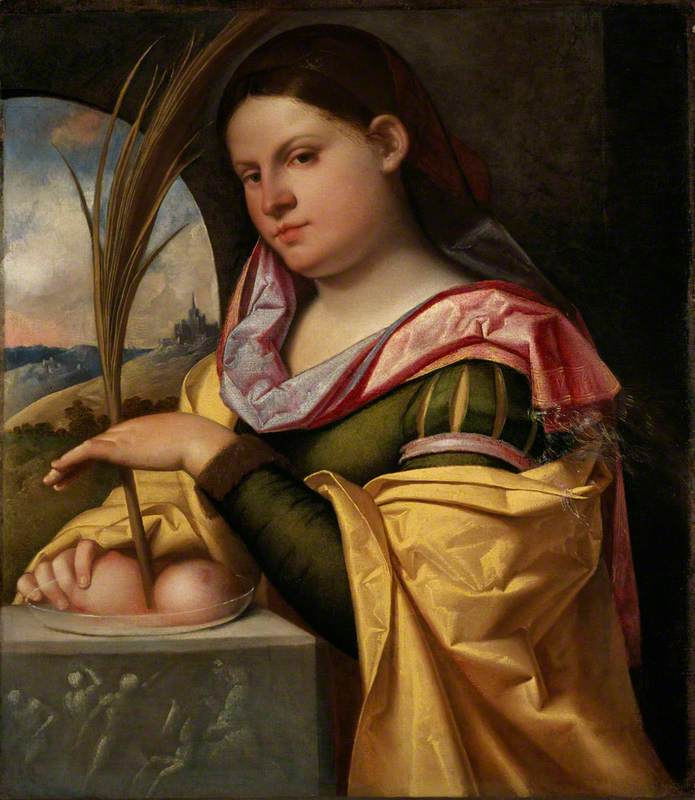
Portrait of a Young Woman as Saint Agatha

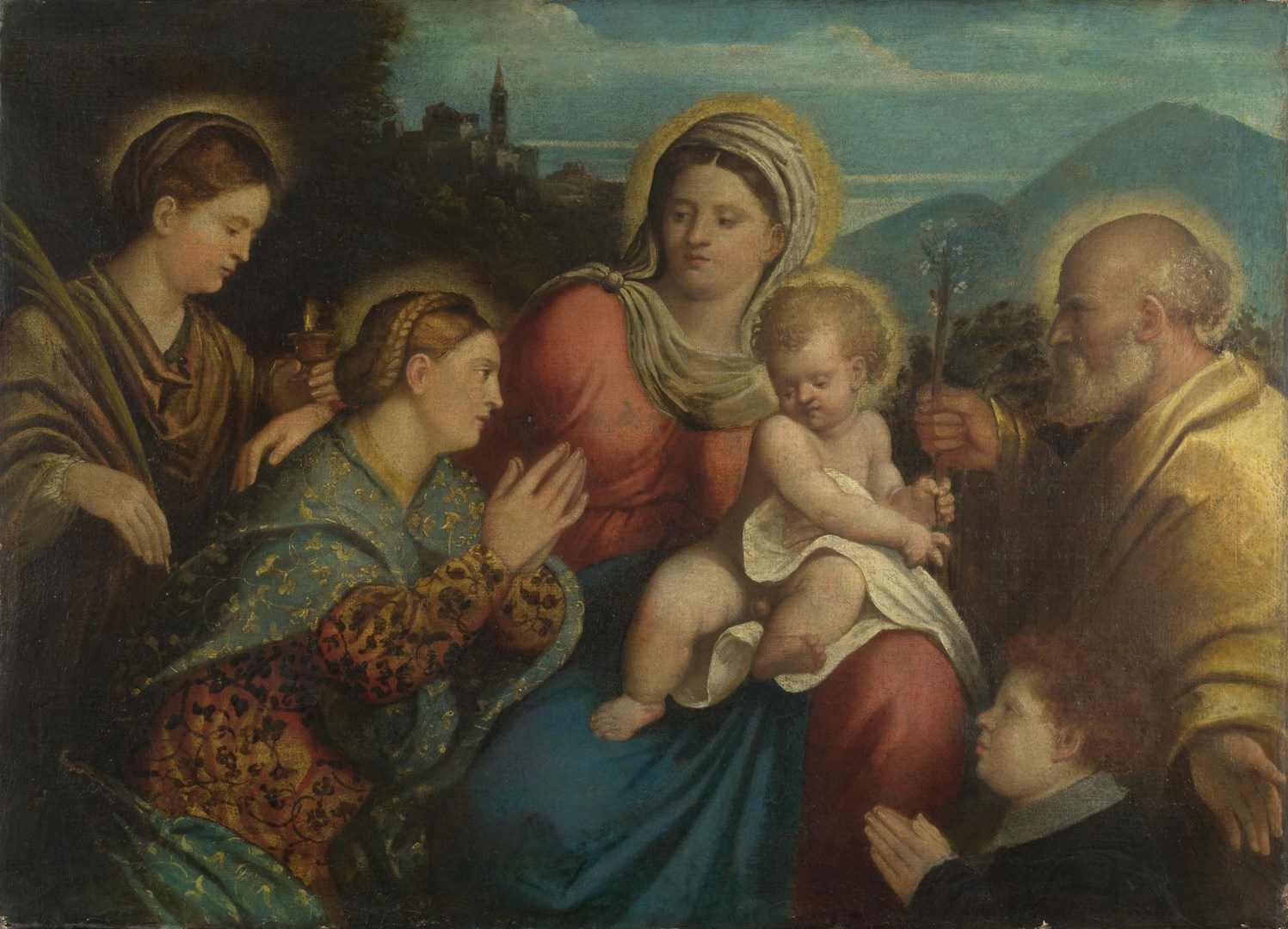
The Holy Family with Saints and a Donor

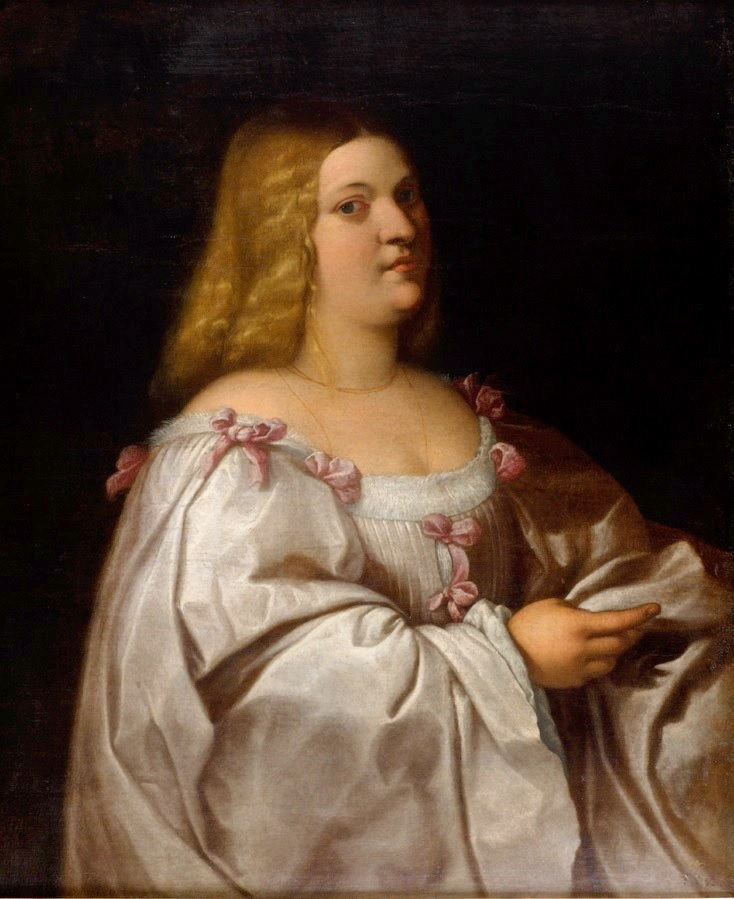
Portrait of a Lady in white

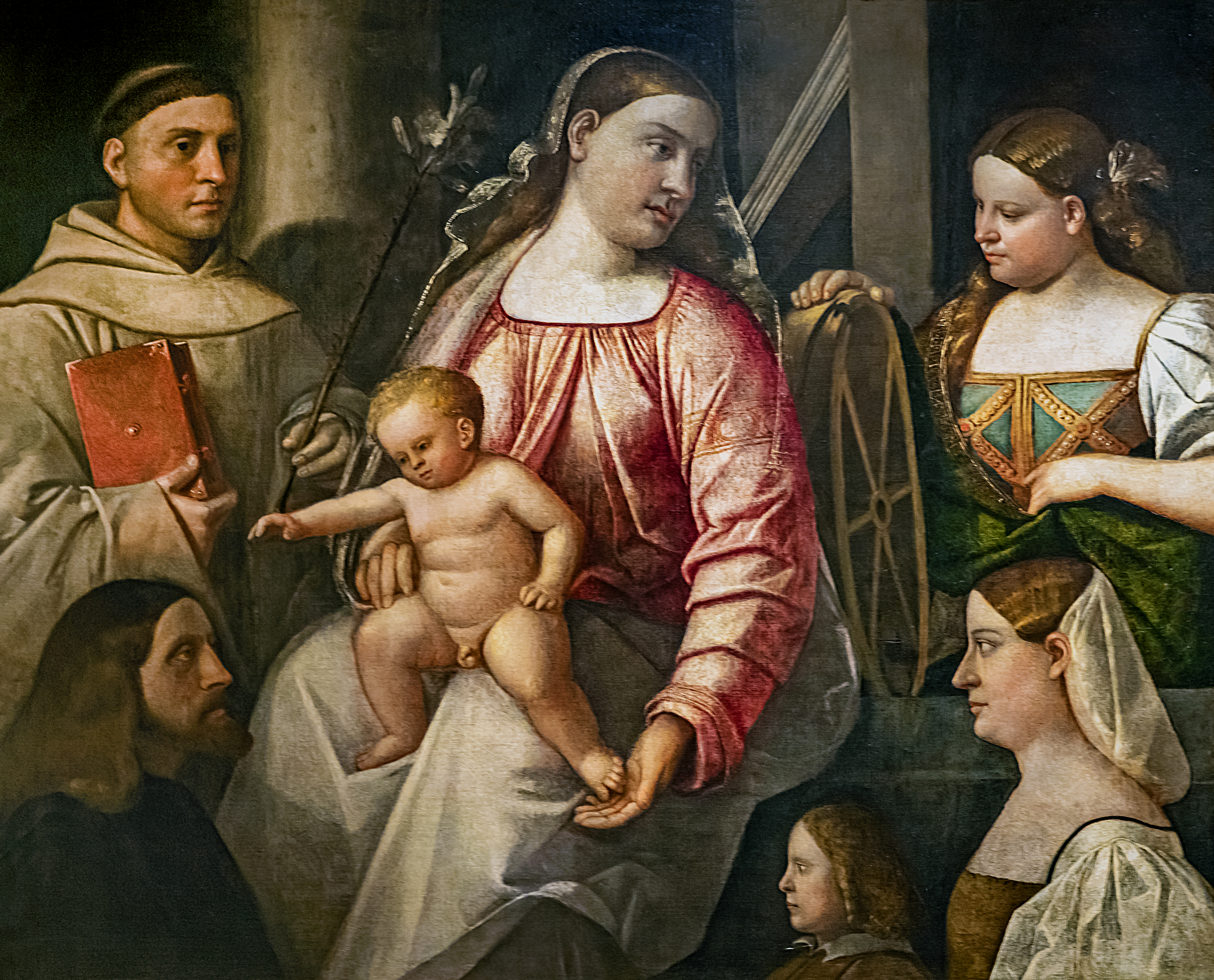
Madonna and Child with Saints Anthony of Padua and Catherine of Alexandria with the three donors
