= Jan van Mieris =

Dutch painter

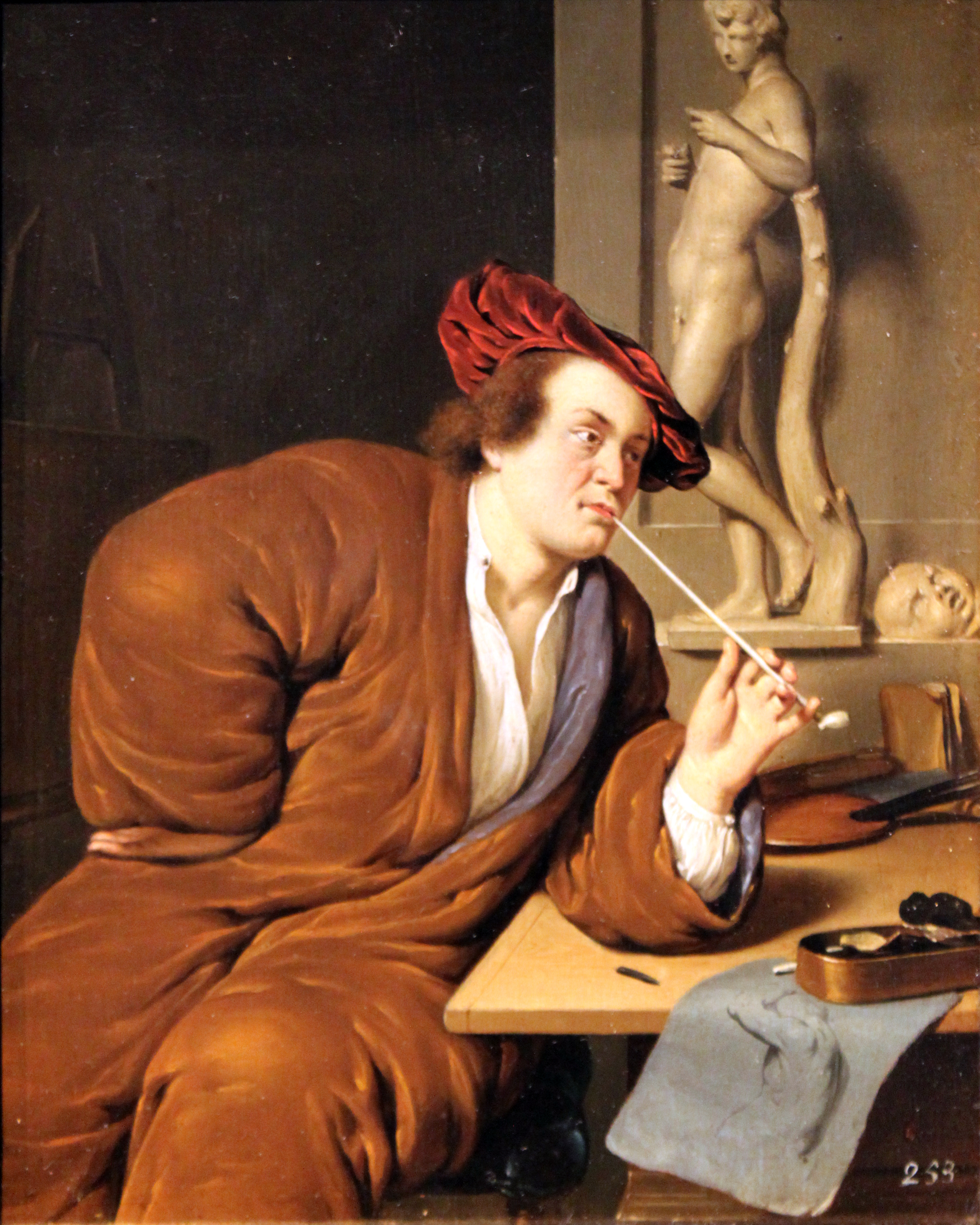
Jan van Mieris, Portrait of an Artist, Smoking a Pipe, 1688, Kunsthalle Hamburg

Jan van Mieris (17 June 1660 – 17 March 1690) was a Dutch painter.

== Life ==
Jan van Mieris (17 June 1660 – 17 March 1690) was a Dutch painter born in Leiden, the eldest son of Frans van Mieris the Elder and Cunera van der Cocq (Sluijter et al. 1988, p. 149). His siblings were Frans II, Christina and Willem Mieris, who was also a painter.

After a short apprenticeship in his father's atelier, he was meant to be educated in history paintings with Gerard de Lairesse. Still, his father refrained from doing so due to Lairesse's unscrupulous lifestyle (Sluijter et al. 1988, p. 149). It is also reported that Jan van Mieris suffered from kidney stones which impeded his progress in his studies (Vogelaar, 2014, p. 20)

In 1684 Jan van Mieris was mentioned as a witness at the wedding of his brother Willem van Mieris; at that stage, he lived at the Blommemark (Flowermarket) in Leiden (Sluijter et al. 1988, p. 149). Afterwards, on June 14, 1686, he paid his entry fee for the Leiden Guild of St. Luke in Leiden. Jan van Mieris paid 3 guilders, half of the regular entry price, because he was the son of a master (Aono, 2014, p. 177). The work of Jan van Mieris was loved by collectors with great names, amongst them the De la Court family from Leiden (Vogelaar, 2014, p. 22).

The archive of the Leiden Remonstrant Church shows that Jan lived with his mother on the Oude Vest for a short period. In the same year, he must have moved to Italy, as on January 14 of 1689, he wrote a letter to his mother from Venice. From this letter, it is concluded that he was healthy. However, he didn't sell any paintings and therefore had plans to continue his travels to Florence (Sluijter et al., 1989, p. 294). He was invited to the court of Cosimo III de Medici, Grand Duke of Tuscany, by friends of his father, but because of religious grounds, he was sent off (Van Gool, 1751, vol. 2, p. 444)

He then proceeded to Rome, where his abilities were already well known. In that city, Jan found himself in the company of a group of young painters with a bad reputation, probably the so-called Bentvueghels, and his condition worsened, but he continued to work for as long as he could (Aono, 2014, p. 177). On March 17, 1690, he died in Rome at 30 (Houbraken,1721, vol. 3 p. 12). An account of Jan's last days has been published by the painter Erasmus Causse (1660-1738), who also describes Jan's funeral outside the city gate of Rome. More than 40 works by Jan van Mieris are known, including one he painted in Rome, dated 1690. However, his oeuvre doesn't entail more than 30 paintings and one drawing (Vogelaar, 2014, p. 20)

== Relations ==
Frans van Mieris the Elder

Frans van Mieris was the head of the van Mieris family, which determined the face of Leiden's Paintings for decades, and was married to Cunera van der Coq, Jan van Mieris's mother (Vogelaar, 2014, p. 21). Jan van Mieris was the oldest son of Frans van Mieris the Elder and learned painting from him early on. Jan van Mieris never fully gained the attention of his father and seemed to be chasing after him for most of his life due to his early passing (Vogelaar, 2014, p. 22)

Willem van Mieris

Willem van Mieris was Jan van Mieris's brother. He was born three years after Jan and took to painting, in contrast to their sister Christina van Mieris. As a result, Jan and Willem van Mieris were sometimes known as The Van Mieris Brothers (Aono, 2014, p. 177).

Frans van Mieris the Younger

Frans van Mieris the Younger was the son of Willem van Mieris and in turn the nephew of Jan van Mieris. Frans the younger also took to painting and even ended up painting a number of the alleged self-portraits (which were copies of the actual portraits) of Jan, Frans the older, and Willem (Naumann, 1981, p. 118)

De la Court Family

In the 17th century, the relationship between patrons and artists had become exceedingly large. Since the head of the van Mieris family had built up a prestigious reputation, his entire family and his direct descendants were guaranteed positions in the city, resulting in a steady flow of commissions from affluent citizens (Sluijter et al., 1989, p. 287). The De La Court family had an especially tightly knit relationship with the Van Mieris family. This is evidenced by the fact that the majority of Jan van Mieris' work came from three passionate collectors of this family: Petronella Oortmans-De la Court, her much younger cousin Pieter de la Court van der Voort from Leiden, and his son Allard (Sluijter et al., 1989, p. 288). Petronella's collection was sold in 1707, she possessed three genre paintings, three history paintings, a self-portrait, and a landscape, with prices varying between 265 and 32 guilders (Sluijter et al., 1989, p. 287).

Johan Augidiuszn

The Leiden burgomaster Johan Augidiuszn. Van der Marck, a collector of many portraits, possessed two drawn self-portraits and one painted one by Jan van Mieris; Van Gool reported the latter. At the end of the 18th c and the beginning of the 19th, even more (self) portraits were for sale, making it difficult to judge how many there were (Sluijter et al., 1989, p. 287).

Grand Duke of Tuscany (Medici Family)

Frans van Mieris the Elder had connections with the Court Medici family. He had previously made a commissioned painting for Cosimo III de Medici, Grand Duke of Tuscany, for the Galleria Vasariana. Therefore, this led Frans van Mieris to be later invited to the Court by his father's friends but he was sent off for religious reasons (Sluijter et al, 1988, p. 149).

The painting made for the Duke was an inspiration for Jan, as there are many similarities between his self-portrait and the one made by his father. This is evidenced by how the shawl is draped and the position of the easel in the backdrop (Sluijter et al., 1989, p. 288). Jan van Mieris must have seen the work when he travelled from Venice to Florence, hoping to get commissions from the Grand Duke (Van Gool, 1750-1751. P. 442).

== Works ==
- Self-portrait (1668): original self portrait that inspired the copy made by Frans van Mieris the younger, it has not been found yet but it was most likely in possession of Frans the Younger (Sluijter et al., 1989, p. 288).
- Portret Van Jan van Mieris (1744): Allard De la Court was particularly fascinated by a self-portrait that was of great importance for the Van Mieris family, causing them to not sell it. This led Allard to order a copy, made by Frans van Mieris the younger in 1744 (Sluijter et al., 1989, p. 288). This painting is thought to be an addition to Allard de la Court's collection of oval-shaped portraits by Frans van Mieris the Younger, Willem van Mieris and Frans van Mieris the Elder, which all had the exact dimension of 5 ¼ x 4 ½ 'thumbs' (Sluijter et al., 1989, p. 302, note 12). It is alleged that Allard de la Court aimed to obtain the complete portrayal of the three generations of the Mieris family. The acquisition of this painting by the De Lakenhal museum in Leiden, made it so Jan van Mieris's portraits were more traceable (Sluijter et al., 1989, p. 287).
- The Tobacco smoker, 1688, Hamburger Kunsthalle collection

As noted by Neumann, the technique of this painting is related to the late period of Frans van Mieris the Elder, especially the unrestricted streaks of light on the dressing gown. In the painting, a young man dressed in a Japanese gown ("japonsche rock") wears a velvet barrett and sits at a table smoking at ease. The Japanese gown that the young painter is wearing can indicate wealth and status, as it is exotic and very precious (Naumann, 1981, p. 118). The figure is surrounded by objects related to drawings, such as a plaster head, a sculpture, and a nude portrait. Since not a single self-portrait of Jan van Mieris was known until recently, determining the authenticity of this painting was impossible. However, with the copy made by Frans van Mieris the Younger, it can be said that the same face is portrayed in this painting, as the pronounced mouth and chin and the sharply drawn eyebrows fully correspond to those painted in the smoking painter self-portrait (Sluijter et al., 1989, p. 288).
The theme of the contemplating smoking painter with an easel in the background is something that must have originated from Gerrit Dou, Frans van Mieris's teacher. By adding the sketch of a nude and a classical sculpture, Jan van Mieris expresses classicistic views, as evidenced by the ‘disegno’ - study of a nude- and the classical sculpture (Sluijter et al, 1988, p. 151). From this painting, it can be concluded that he was on his way to becoming a good history painter, combining his father's technique of history pieces with compositions inspired by De Lairesse (Naumann, 1981, p. 118)

- Lady and Cavalier (1680): Jan van Mieris wasn't as interested in repeating typical 17th century genre compositions and motifs as his brother Willem was. He was more focused on the classicizing style that came to dominate the market in those days (Aono, 2014 p. 70). Although he did make a free copy after his father's "Lady and Cavalier " panel (London, Buckingham Palace) which indicates his interest in this type of genre painting in his early years . In this piece Jan van Mieris has changed the jacket of the man into a simpler one and covered the woman's breasts with white lace while setting the couple in a lavishly furnished interior (Anno, 2014 p. 177).
- A Woman Holding a Dog in a Landscape, panel, 26.7x20.6 cm, New York, The Leiden Collection
- A Courtesan Counting Money, panel 29x22.9 cm, New York, The Leiden Collection
- De Schilderkunst (Pictura) or The art of Painting, Mauritshuis
- Minerva verheft de Wetenschap (Minerva elevates the sciences), 80.2 x 64.2 cm, 1685 This painting depicts a classical subject in a virtuoso manner. The imitation of the glossy flannel and the copper which can be observed in the painting was most likely learned from his father, Frans van Mieris (Vogelaar, 2014, p. 20). The interest in classical subjects of the latter stemmed from his teacher, an eminently classicist painter, Gerard de Lairesse, from Amsterdam (Vogelaar, 2014, p. 20).

== Drawings ==
Six more drawings were recently added to Jan van Mieris' oeuvre. In his finished drawings, he tried to follow in the footsteps of his father and his brother. However, as mentioned in 1751 by r Jan van Gool, Jan van Mieris did not have the talent or the inclination for detailed painting. This is seen in Jan's drawings, with a sketchy style that seems unexpected given his Leiden 'Fijnschilder' background, yet relatively recognizable, especially since his compositions have certain recurrent features (Tatenhove, 2007, p. 43). The first of the newly attributed drawings is the study for the painting "Minerva elevates the arts". Correspondingly, five of the six newly attributed drawings are centred around mythology or classical history: "Socrates and Xanthippe," "Paris and Oenone," "Belisarius as a blind beggar recognized by a soldier," "Cecrops' daughter discovers the serpent-shaped Erinchthonius" "Pandora handed over to Epimetheus by Mercury" and "The death of Lucretia" (Tatenhove, 2007, p. 43)

== Poetry ==
Jan van Mieris was also a poet. He translated the play Aminta, written by Torquato Tasso and also wrote several poems himself. Three of these poems concern his father: one is about his fathers painting "The old lover" and in the two other poems Jan mourns his father's death. These poems and the translation of the play, are part of a manuscript kept in the University Library in Leiden (Van der Hut, 2009, p. 5.), Jan van Mieris was twenty one years old and his brother Willem was eighteen when his father Frans van Mieris the elder died in 1681. It is not self-evident that the poems Jan van Mieris's manuscript were also created by himself. It is possible that he copied them; in any case, he considered them worth writing down (Vogelaar, 2014, p. 22).
