= Willem van Mieris =

Dutch painter

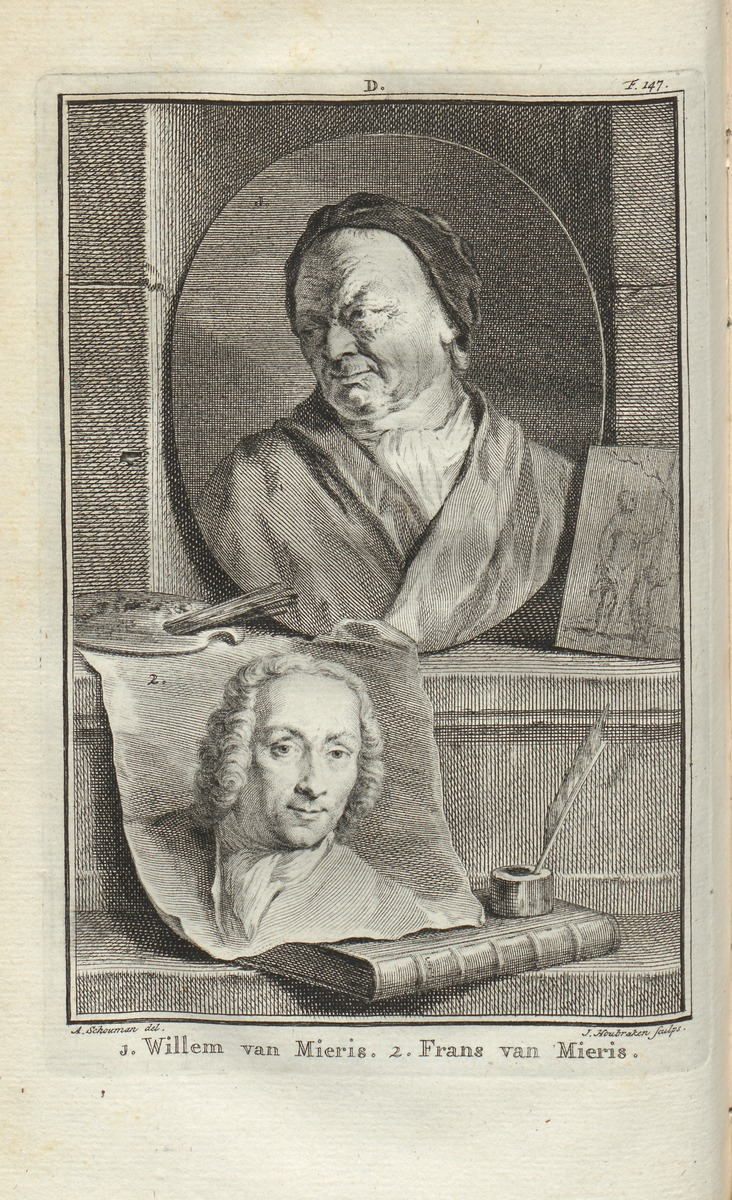
Willem van Mieris (top) and his father Frans, illustration by Aert Schouman and Jacob Houbraken for Jan van Gool's Nieuwe Schouburg

Willem van Mieris (3 June 1662 – 26 January 1747) was an 18th-century painter from the Dutch Republic.

== Biography ==
Willem van Mieris was a painter, sculptor and etcher active in Leiden. He was born in Leiden and studied under his father Frans van Mieris the Elder (1635–1682), who was a successful genre painter. Willem had a reasonably successful career, being supported by a few patrons who commissioned and collected various of his works. His oeuvre consists mostly of genre and portraiture, with some landscape painting, as well as some sculptures. Van Mieris' style was that of the fijnschilders (painters in the "fine manner"), and his genre works, especially later in his career, depicted scenes from upper-class society.

At age 19, Van Mieris took over the family workshop after his father died in 1681, aged 45. He had barely finished his training in the family studio and it would take another two years before he entered the Leiden painters' guild in 1685. He set out to uphold his father's reputation as a Leiden fijnschilder. The Leiden fine painters produced a small scale of mostly genre paintings or portraits with high attention to detail, which was made popular by Frans' master Gerrit Dou (1613–1675), a Dutch Golden Age painter. Frans' superb skills as a painter rubbed off on his son and his influence can be seen in technique, subject matter, and style. He finished what was left incomplete on his father's demise. One year later, in 1684, he married his wife Agneta Chapman, whom he often used as his model.

Besides genre and portrait painting, Van Mieris was also a skilled landscape painter, etcher, and draughtsman; moreover, he also tried his hand at history painting with remarkable results. He acted as headman and once as dean of the Leiden Guild of St. Luke in 1693. A year later, in 1694, he founded a drawing academy in Leiden together with the painters Jacob Toorenvliet (c. 1636–1719) and Carel de Moor (1655–1738), which he and de Moor directed until 1736. At that time, Van Mieris stopped working as an artist because he became partially blind and no dated work passes the 1730s.

Van Mieris was born in a family of Dutch painters. Not only his father, but also his brother and son had a background in art. Jan van Mieris (1660–1690) studied under his father Frans the Elder, as well as under Gerard de Lairesse (1641–1711), to eventually become a genre and portrait painter. Willem's son, Frans van Mieris the Younger (1689–1763), was a pupil of his father. He worked as a genre painter and writer, and was considered a distinguished antiquary, who published works of merit on numismatics and history. Such a family background in art, good relationships with wealthy collectors and patrons, and apprenticeships with successful 17th-century masters seems to have made the choice of profession easier in families such as the Van Mierises. Willem, Jan, and Frans II, all direct descendants of the famous seventeenth century fine painter Frans I van Mieris, were bound for prestigious positions in the city, resulting in steady income from the commissions from affluent citizens.

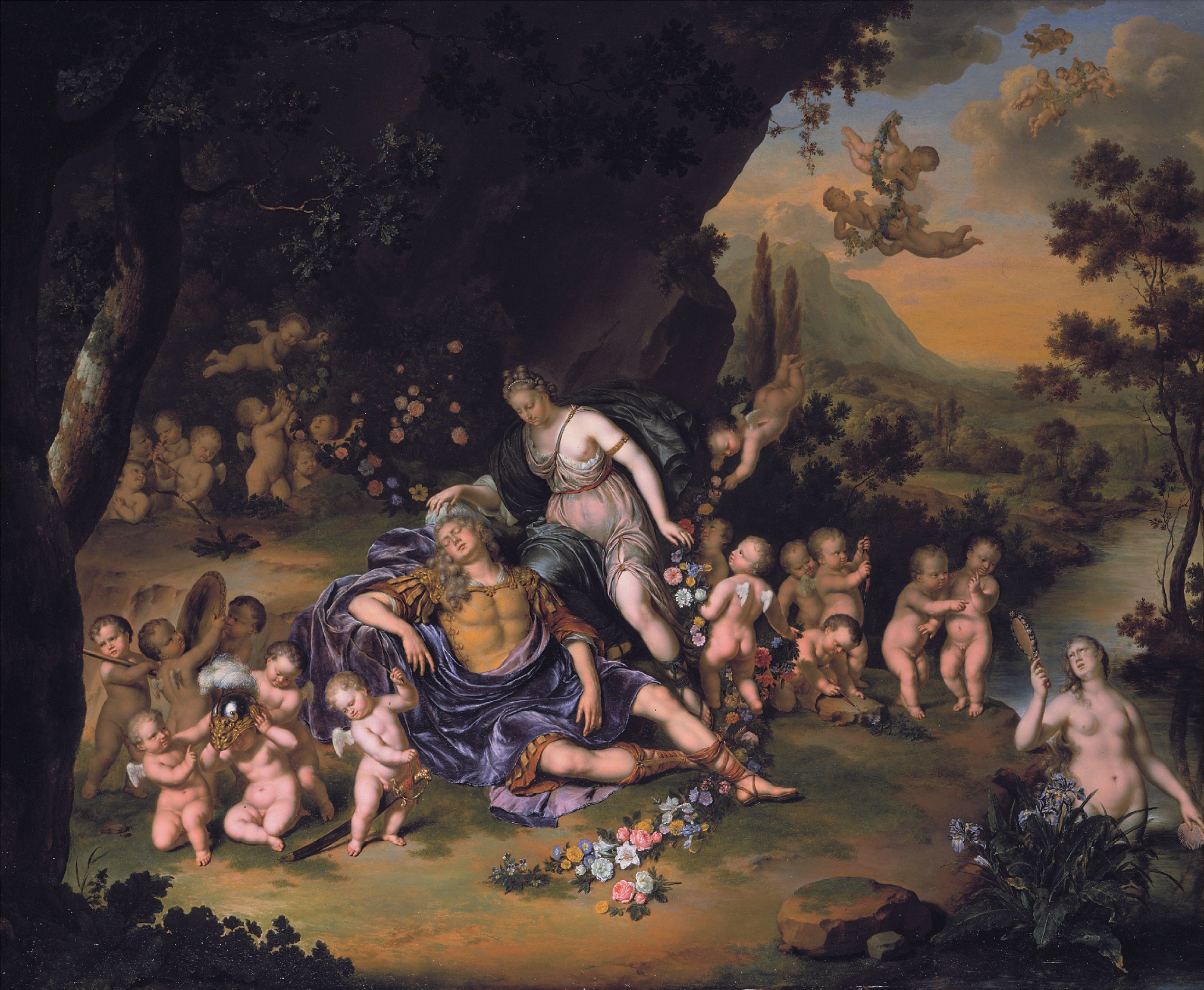
Rinaldo and Armida, 1709. Commissioned by Pieter de la Court van der Voort (1664–1739), Leiden Mauritshuis

== Artistic career ==
=== Style and influences ===
The fijnschilders, whose activity was mainly concentrated in Leiden, included many of the most popular painters of the time, such as Gerard Dou and Willem's father: needless to say, the latter had a decisive influence in shaping young Willem's style. In fact, Frans van Mieris was among the most famous Dutch painters of the late 17th century, his popularity crossing the Netherlands' border time and again: he was highly esteemed by both Cosimo III de' Medici, Grand Duke of Tuscany and Archduke Leopold of Palatinate, who was to become Emperor Leopold I. His paintings are mostly elegant genre scenes, but they show us the main features of the fijnschilders' conception of painting: even in scenes representing trivial subjects, the Leiden painters strove for absolute perfection in rendering details and refining features in order to achieve absolute elegance. Willem van Mieris, having been introduced to, and trained in, painting by his father, could not but be heavily influenced by the fijnschilders' ideas, ultimately becoming a member of the second generation of Leiden fine painters.

However, Willem van Mieris soon parted ways with Frans when it came to subject matter. In fact, although he still focused on genre painting, his works usually depict scenes taken from the life of the upper class, and even when the protagonists belong to the low spheres of the society, they look much more elegant and refined than their real-life counterparts. This is mainly due to the influence exerted on Willem van Mieris by Gerard de Lairesse, whose Groot Schilderboek, published in 1707, marked the transition from the 17th to the 18th century in Dutch art. In his extensive treatise, de Lairesse stated that the aim of genre painters should no longer be representing the human figure as it is (which was one of the pivotal features of Dutch Golden Age painting), but as it ought to be according to the classical canons of beauty. More specifically, de Lairesse claimed it was necessary to ennoble genre painting, in order to take it to the same level of excellence and public admiration awarded to history painting. To achieve this purpose, the Amsterdam art theoretician proposed that the human protagonists of genre painting (especially women), no matter which social class they belonged to, be represented after classical antiquity sculptures, with their unsurpassable perfection and proportion. De Lairesse's views fascinated Van Mieris, especially after he had the opportunity to experiment directly with classicizing figures thanks to the sculptures of the Flemish artist Francis van Bossuit, who had previously lived and worked in Italy and took inspiration from classical antiquity sculpture for his works. Van Mieris drew many illustrations after Bossuit's sculptures, and borrowed some of their poses for his paintings.

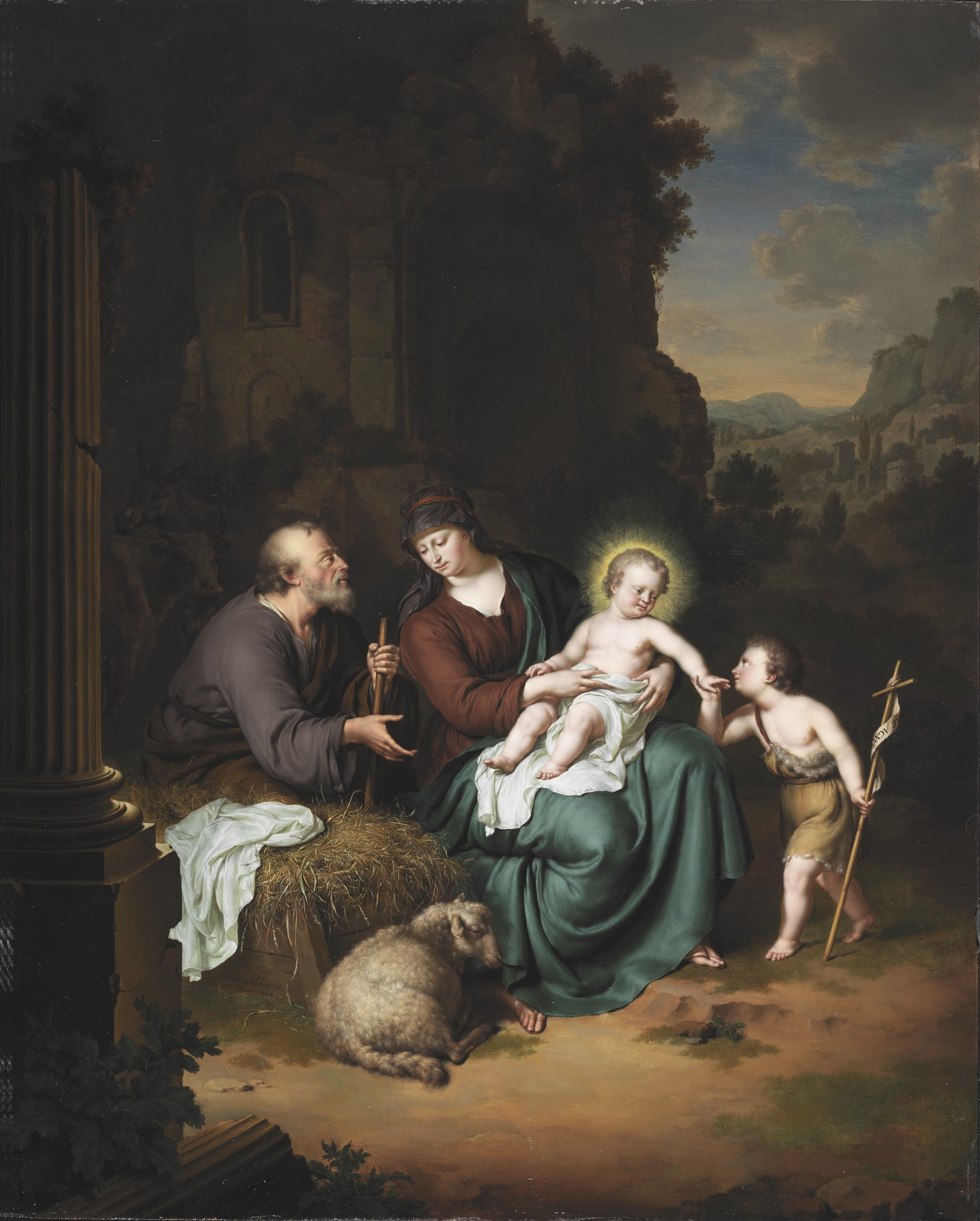
The Holy Family and Saint John the Baptist, 1708

Another distinctive feature of van Mieris's oeuvre is the repetition of certain figures and poses in many of his paintings. This phenomenon, which was actually widespread among both Dutch 18th century history and genre painters, can yet again be tracked back to the new classicizing tendencies of Dutch art. In fact, the social scenario in the Netherlands changed dramatically after 1672, the so-called "year of calamities", and the subsequent war against France, England, and several German states: the aftermath of the conflict saw most of the commercial power of Holland ending up shattered, thus drastically reducing the number of rich collectors interested in buying new works of art. Subsequently, the painters started to modify their style in order to get accustomed with the predominant taste of the few, powerful regents left in the country, who usually aimed at formally elegant and proportionate paintings rather than truthful representations of real life such as those produced during the Golden Age. Thus, artists like Willem van Mieris, who dedicated himself both to history and genre painting, started using figures taken from mythological and biblical works in genre scenes, trying to present them either as common people or, more frequently, as exponents of the nobility, of course with an appropriate background setting (e.g. a richly decorated Palladian villa). Moreover, reusing the same motifs and figures in several paintings allowed the artists to save time and energy, thus leading them to produce more works and having more possibilities of finding an interested collector.

Willem van Mieris' artistic approach to painting included the repetition of similar figures and the features of figures. This approach provided both practical and aesthetic benefits to the artist. Not only did it allow the artist to be highly productive in the studio, it also allowed him to trademark his own type of idealized female figure throughout his oeuvre. Comparisons have been drawn between Willem van Mieris and Gerard ter Borch, another Dutch genre painter of the Dutch Golden Age, who used the technique of repeating figures to realize their common goal of increasing productivity while reducing labour. Willem van Mieris has also been compared to artists like Gerard ter Borch, Gerard Dou, and Jan Steen, for their shared artistic approach to painting which involved designing a group of interacting figures first, and subsequently designing the setting which the figures occupied.

Painters like Willem van Mieris reused not only their own figures, but also those present in paintings by the masters of the previous generations. This was again due to the necessity of pleasing the few patrons and collectors, who greatly admired the works of artists such as Gerard Dou, a member of the first generation of fijnschilders. Willem van Mieris explicitly refers to Dou in two different paintings the subject of which is almost directly borrowed from the eminent master. In this respect, Van Mieris proved to be discreet enough to carefully choose which elements to take from other painters' works in order not to be accused of plagiarism, which was already an issue at the time. In fact, specific guidelines had already been established about how to refer to paintings by previous masters without ending up with mere copies of their work, which were obviously despised as signs of the painter's incapability of producing a work on his own.

One of the major characteristics of Willem van Mieris' artistic style is his idealization of the female nude. Van Mieris' idea of beauty in genre paintings is deeply rooted in and modeled after his studies of classical sculpture. The artist's reference to classical sculpture follows the instructions outlined by Gerard de Lairesse for the improvement of genre painting in his book Groot Schilderboek. De Lairesse suggested that artists should refer to classical sculpture to create an idealized female nude form and should adapt this form to ordinary women within the context of genre painting, a suggestion that is evidently followed by Willem van Mieris throughout his genre paintings.

One of Willem van Mieris' major influences was Francis van Bossuit (1635–1692). Van Bossuit studied Italian sculpture in Rome and was esteemed as a sculptor in Amsterdam from 1680 until his death. Willem van Mieris turned to Van Bossuit's classicized sculptures to develop his own aesthetic for portraying idealized female nudes. Frits Scholten, the senior curator of sculpture at the Rijksmuseum in Amsterdam, has suggested that Willem van Mieris borrowed poses and gestures directly from Francis van Bossuit's sculptures and applied them throughout his own oeuvre. Between the years 1669 and 1702, Willem van Mieris made at least thirteen drawings on parchment modeled after van Bossuit's sculptures, believed to have been produced as works of art rather than preparatory studies for his history paintings.

=== Models ===
Agneta Chapman, Willem van Mieris' wife, is considered to have acted as the artist's first model. During the beginning stages of van Mieris' career between 1680 and 1687, the artist produced numerous paintings and drawings depicting young women often represented as mythological figures, which were modelled after his wife. In van Mieris' painting Flora, which currently resides in the Morgan Library & Museum in New York, it is suggested that Agneta served as the model. In this painting, van Mieris disguises his wife as Flora, the ancient Roman goddess of flowers, fertility and spring. The inclusion of peonies helps signify feminine beauty and fertility, which is appropriate given the context of the painting's execution taking place only one year before Willem's and Agneta's wedding. A similar face, suggested to be modeled after Agneta's, reappears in many of van Mieris' early works, including Allegory of Arrogance from 1684, Old Man Seducing a Young Woman from 1683, Artemis Holding an Arrow from 1686, and Woman with a Bird Cage (Lesbia) from 1687. Comparisons have been drawn between Willem van Mieris and Rembrandt, who used his wife Saskia as the model for his depiction of the goddess Flora.

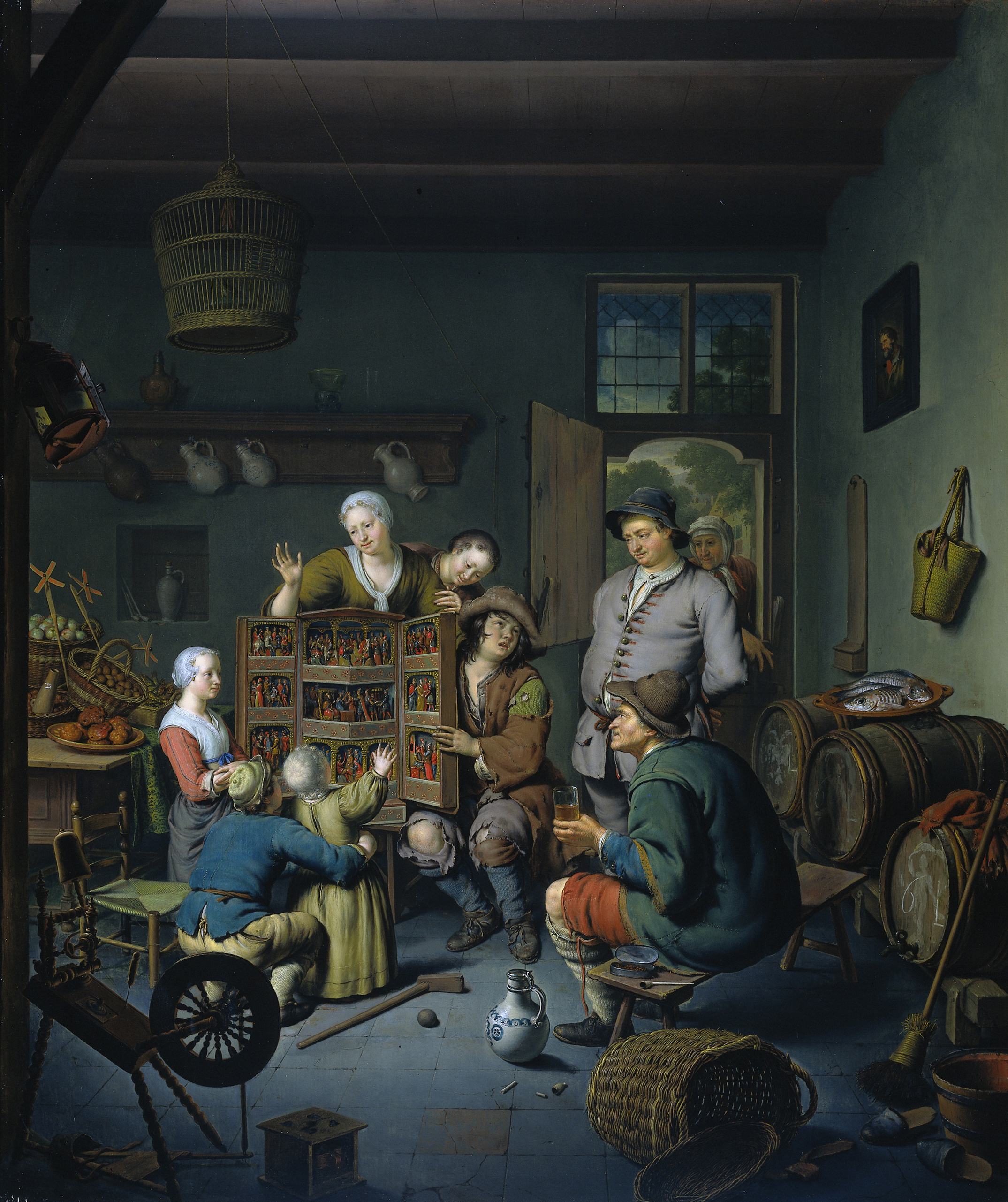
De rarekiek (’t Fraay Curieus), 1718. Rijksmuseum

== Patrons and legacy ==
=== Patrons and collectors ===
Willem van Mieris was supported mostly by two patrons: Johan Hendrik van Wassenaer Obdam (1683–1745) and the De la Court Family. Count Van Wassenaer Obdam was a nobleman and politician from The Hague, who also was a great art lover and collector. He was one of the most important clients of Van Mieris and showed great interest in Dutch genre paintings, also called "modern" pieces at the time. He appreciated paintings that represented the familiar, everyday circumstances. The 1750 sales catalogue of his collection (121 pieces) that was made after his death tells us that Van Wassenaer owned work by Adriaan van Ostade, Gerard Dou, Jan Steen, Frans I van Mieris, Gabriel Metsu, and Willem van Mieris. The catalogue mentions no fewer than 10 paintings by Willem van Mieris: seven genre paintings, one of which might be An Old Man Reading a Newspaper, and three landscapes. The most outstanding pieces are four genre paintings representing a kitchen or shop scene. The family archive of Van Wassenaer in Twickel has provided evidence that the two men had a close relationship: Van Wassenaer bought paintings directly from van Mieris, including A Kitchen with a Fishmonger, A Woman Weighing Chestnuts, A Grocer's Shop, Interior with Monkeys, and two landscapes. However, it remains unclear whether Van Wassenaer commissioned Van Mieris to make these paintings, but the regular purchase of expensive paintings from the artist himself suggest that the two had close and regular contact. Van Mieris probably selected subject matter that appealed to Van Wassenaer in order to establish even better relations.

The arguably more important patron, however, was Pieter de la Court van der Voort (1664–1739), son of Pieter de la Court (1618–1685) and his second wife, Catharina van der Voort (1622–1674). The De la Court family were rich cloth merchants, and Pieter de la Court van der Voort was a prominent art collector. In his mansion in Leiden he devoted three separate rooms exclusively for the exhibition of his huge collection of paintings and other rooms contained more paintings. He is known to have commissioned Willem van Mieris to make paintings of all kinds – genre, portrait, landscape, history, and still life. In fact, he was so impressed by van Mieris' skill, that he did not only commission original works, but also copies of well-known and much appreciated paintings. According to Pieter's handwritten inventory of 1731 and that of his son Allard de la Court (1688–1755) in 1749, Pieter commissioned Van Mieris to paint ten copies after the work of famous 17th-century painters, such as his father Frans I van Mieris, Gerard Dou, Ary de Vois (1632–1635 to 1680) and Philip Wouwerman (1619–1688). These works must have been accessible to him, although it is not known where the originals were located when Van Mieris copied them. Such copies functioned as high-valuable substitutes for much-loved 17th-century paintings that were unavailable to most collectors. Some of these copies were so good that both salesmen and owners would let them pass as the originals. However, the collectors eager to buy copies still held a clear distinction in value between original and copy. An average copy by Willem van Mieris commissioned by Pieter de la Court van der Voort was 60 guilders, while he was paid much more for work of his own design. In total, Pieter de la Court van der Voort commissioned at least 28 paintings, including copies, from Van Mieris. The large collection and close contact between the two men gave Van Mieris the opportunity to get inspired by the work of other artists, such as Van Bossuit's sculptures, on which many of Van Mieris' drawings are based Besides paintings, Pieter de la Court van der Voort also commissioned four vases for the garden of his Leiden mansion (see below). The two were not only associated through business, but were also intimate friends and Pieter de la Court van der Voort was proud of that. He denied any offer on his friend's work and protected the works themselves and their uniqueness carefully. After his death, he left his collection to his son Allard de la Court, who extended it with more, mostly commissioned, work.

No relationship between the two patrons has been established, except for an archival document from the eighteenth century, which testifies Van Wassenaer's intention to buy Dou's Grocer's Shop. Allard de la Court, who inherited most of his father's collection, describes Van Wassenaer's efforts to acquire the painting at a hefty price. This shows how much Van Wassenaer appreciated Dou's Grocer's Shop and it is possible that Van Mieris made his own version modelled closely after Dou's to please his patron.

Another collection worth mentioning is the one by Sir Matthew Decker (1669–1749). This Dutchman emigrated to London in 1702, where he made a fortune as a banker and director of the East India Company. He was a skilled buyer of art and bought paintings in the Netherlands to ship them across to England. By the end of his life, he amassed a good collection, including paintings by Dou and Willem van Mieris.

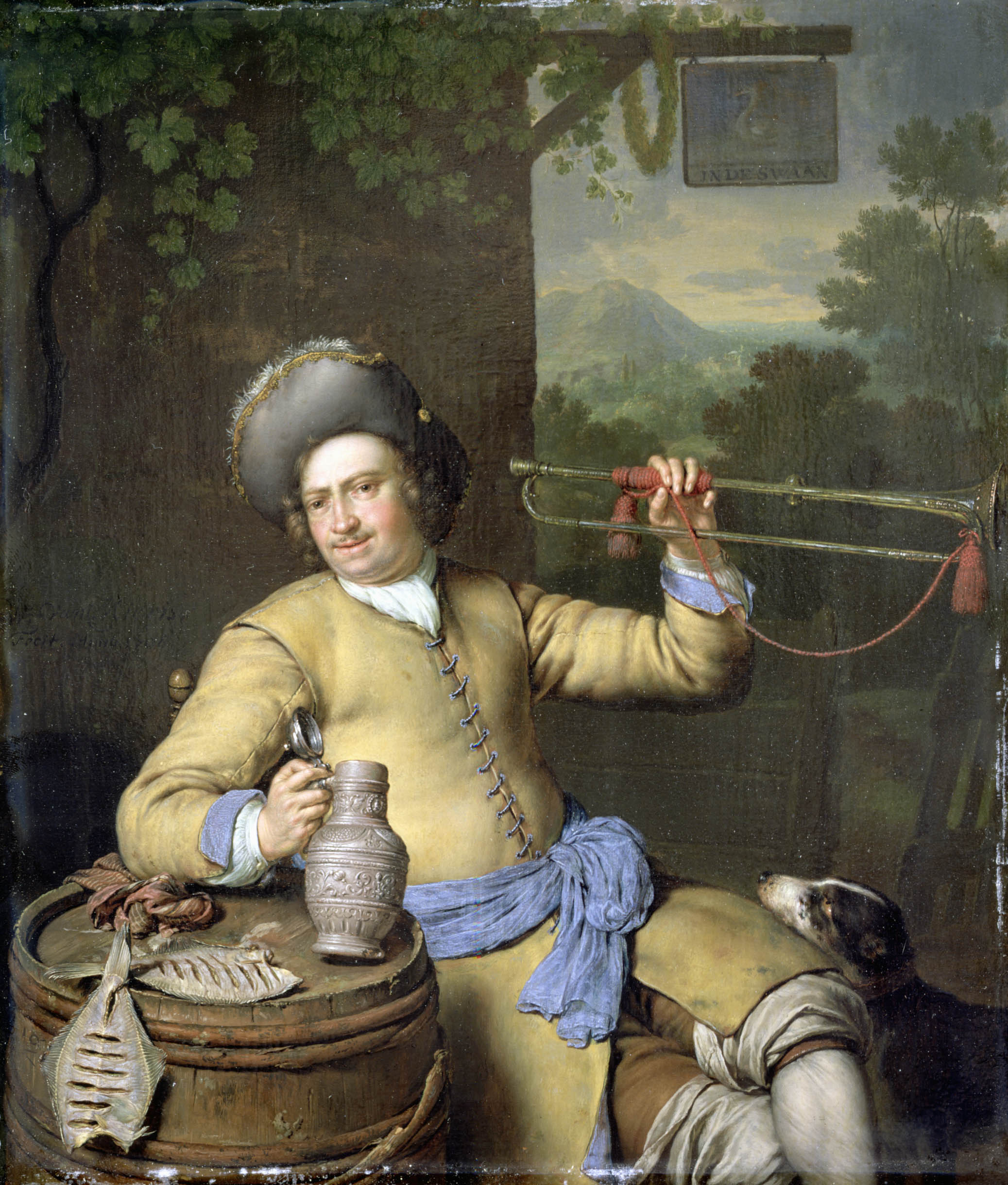
The Trumpetter, 1708. Museum De Lakenhal

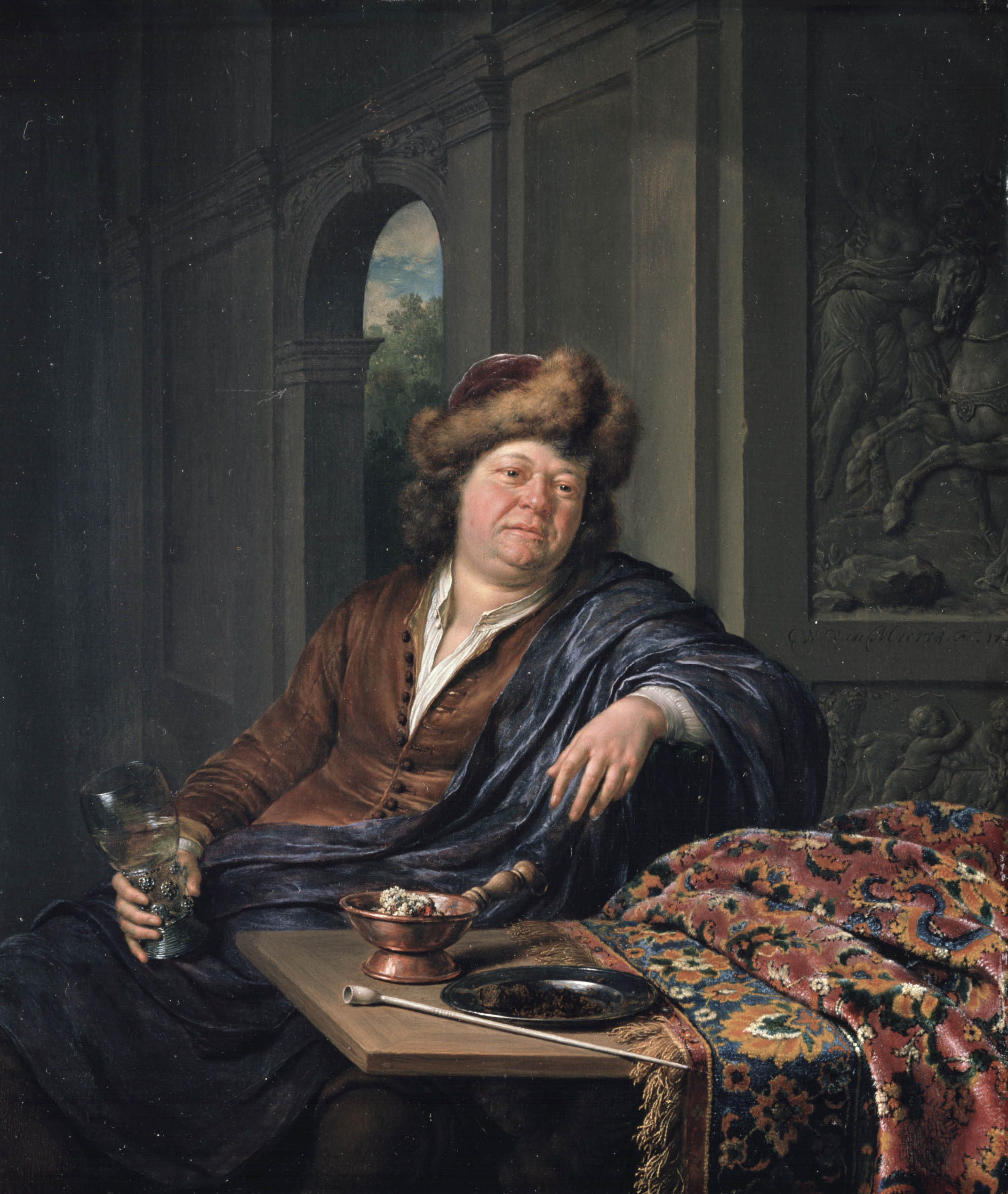
The Drinker, 1706

=== Pupils ===
Hieronymous van der Mij, born in 1687 in Leiden, was one of Willem van Mieris' pupils. Van der Mij painted mostly portraits, borrowing from van Mieris' style. His portraits were highly regarded because of how much they resembled the sitters, who were usually high status individuals including professors or regents of the armhouse.

Willem van Mieris also took care of training his son Frans in the art of painting: when the old artist was forced to retire from active work due to his progressive blindness, he passed on his studio to his son, and the two consistently worked together. However, Frans van Mieris the Younger was not nearly as successful as his father and grandfather: only very few of his works are known to us, and he never managed to gain popularity among collectors. Some of his paintings were even refused by the commissioner, as happened with the German prince of Mecklenburg-Schwerin, who decided not to accept Frans's Diana bathing (executed in close collaboration with Willem) due to its poor quality. After these unsatisfactory results, Frans van Mieris the Younger soon quit painting to dedicate himself to antiquarian collections: he was a highly esteemed expert in numismatics, a field he wrote several renowned treatises on.

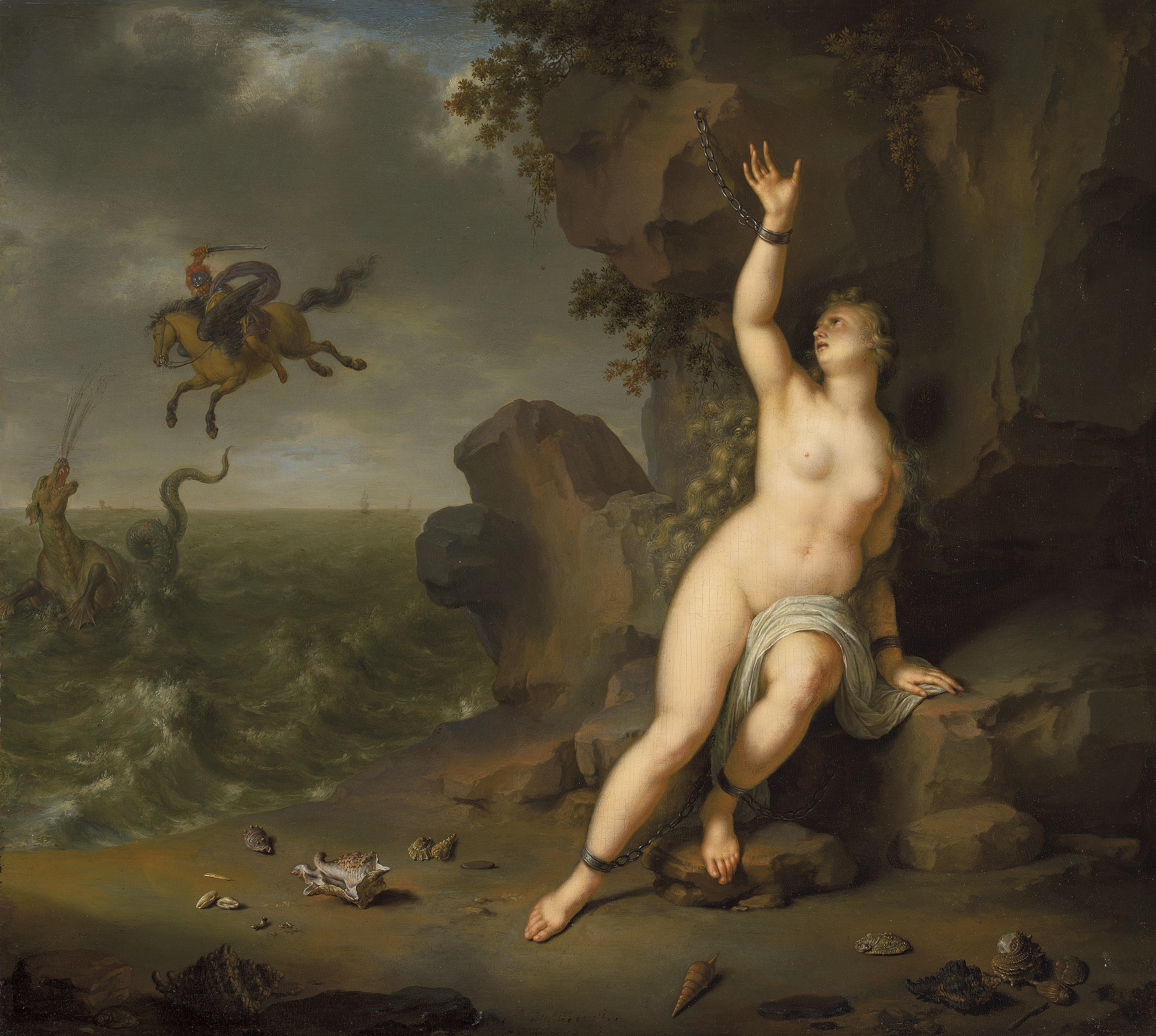
Perseus and andromeda

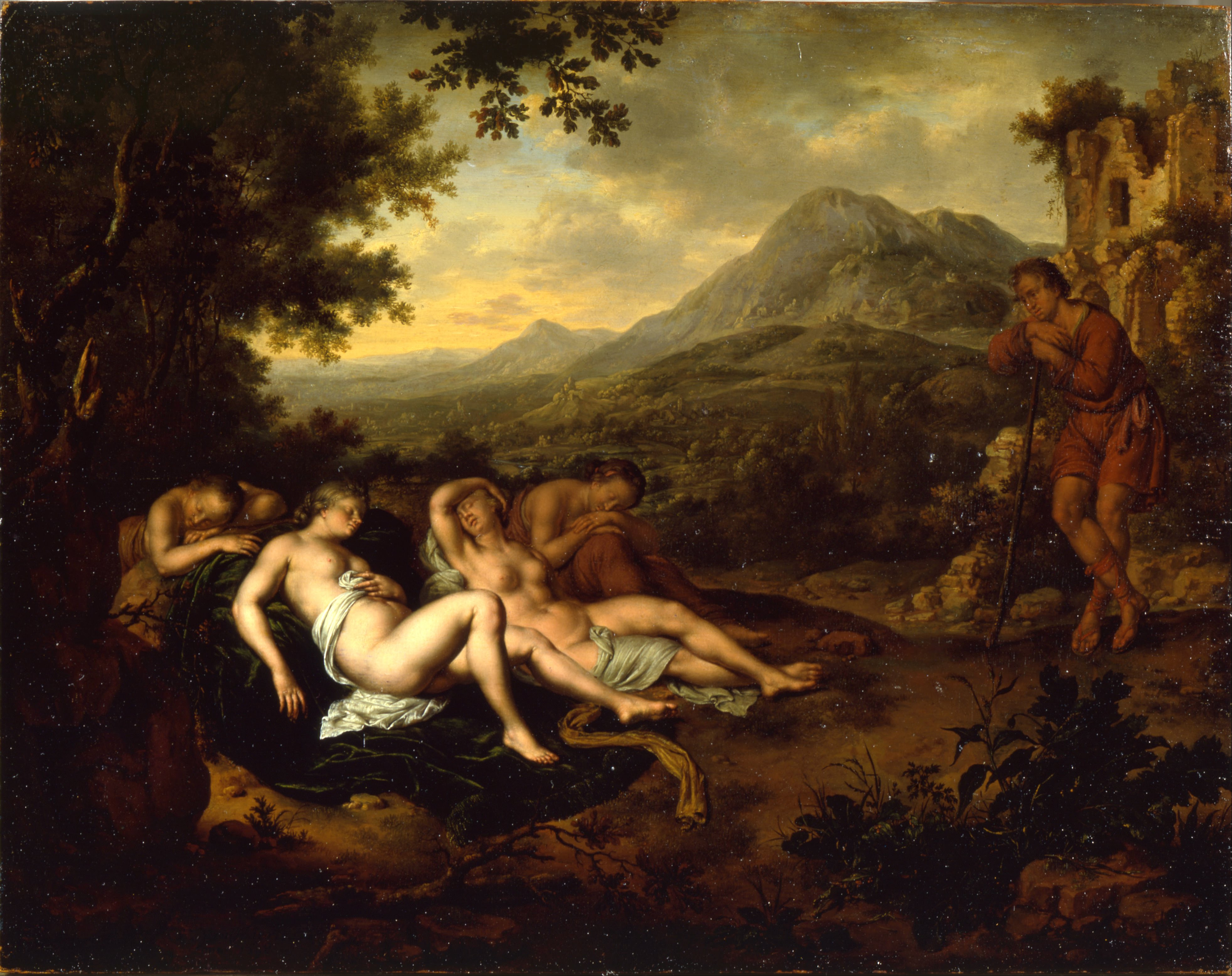
Cimon and Iphigenia

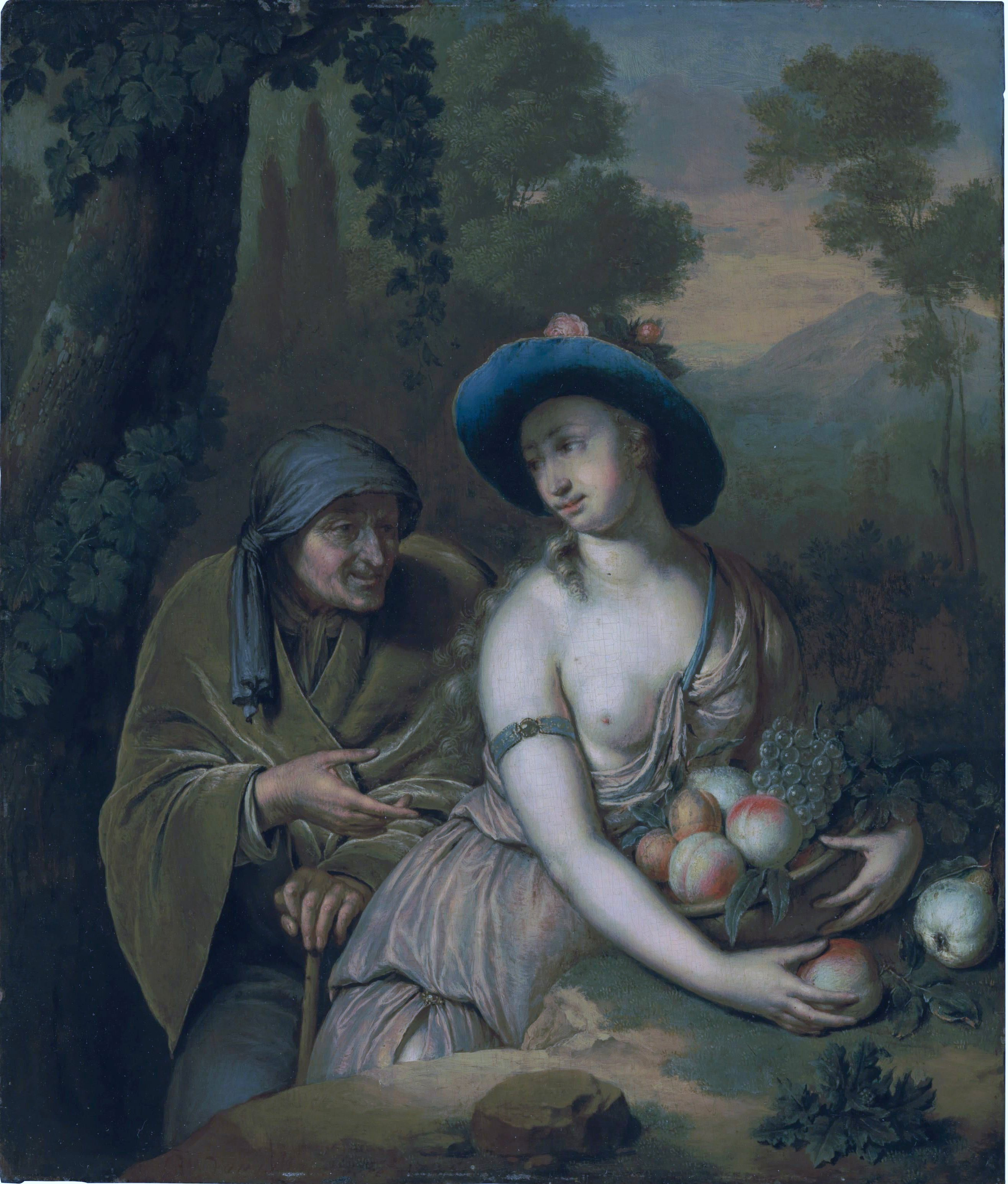
Vertumnus and Pomona, 1725.

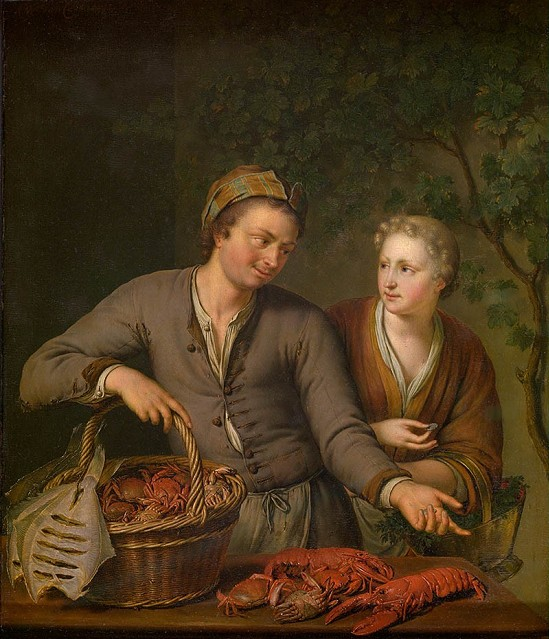
The Fish Seller, Koninklijk Museum voor Schone Kunsten Antwerpen

== Key works ==
=== Paintings ===
In Willem van Mieris' painting of Bathsheba from 1708, Bathsheba is depicted in the nude sitting before King David. In October 1707, while van Mieris worked on Bathsheba, ten works by the sculptor van Bossuit were sold from the collection of van Mieris' patron Petronella Oortmans-de la Court, bringing attention to the sculptures of van Bossuit and influencing van Mieris's work. When comparing van Mieris's Bathsheba to two of his drawings that he produced after van Bossuit's sculptures, namely Venus and Cupid and Diana and Callisto, the influence that van Bossuit's sculptures played on Bathsheba becomes evident. In van Mieris's drawing Venus and Cupid, Venus's facial profile shows a strong resemblance to Bathsheba's. In the painter's drawing Diana and Callisto, the position of Diana's body is also similar to that of Bathsheba's. Consequently, it is believed that Bathsheba's graceful pose and gesture, characteristic of van Mieris's trademarked idealized female nude, is directly borrowed from van Bossuit's sculptures. In Willem van Mieris's Lute Player from 1711, the woman depicted in the painting strikingly resembles Bathsheba, which is representative of the painter's repetition of figures.

In Willem van Mieris's painting Granida and Daifilo from 1697, he depicts a scene from P.C. Hooft's pastoral play Granida, a common choice of subject matter in Dutch 17th-century painting. In this painting, van Mieris "combines the minuteness of his Leyden School with a more international late 17th-century classicism". Granida's headgear, the shepherdess's straw hat, as well as Daifilo's tiger-skin are suggested to allude to the theatre. The painting was once part of the Winkler Collection at Leipzig in 1768, but was recorded for the last time when it was passed through a London sale in 1900.

Van Mieris's painting Le Thé is mostly to be inspired Gerard de Lairesse's idea to depict a tea party in his book Groot Schilderboek (1707), in which he translates the laws of international classicism into practical rules for artist's to apply in their studios. Le Thé depicts a scene of a young woman offering a friend a cup of tea, while the friend refuses to accept the tea as she must leave. While van Mieris generally followed the rules for genre painting outlined by De Lairesse, he did not share De Lairesse's belief that genre painting should be as similar to history painting as possible. An additional difference between De Lairesse and van Mieris is that van Mieris eliminates all traces of psychological tension and conflict between the figures, as well as all sense of narration and progression of time.

==== De rarekiek ====
Once part of the prized collection of Allard de la Court, De Rarekiek was commissioned by de la Court for 1000 guilders. It took a different, more modern approach to the concept of the quack or salesman who is exhibiting his wares, which was a common theme at the time, by replacing the salesman with a man showing off a raree-show. Van Mieris called the painting "'t Fraai Curieus" ("the fine curiosity), using an expression that was common in the 18th century to refer to travelling minstrels. This painting was one of the few paintings where Van Mieris was trying to renew his repertoire of kitchen scenes and shop interiors.

==== Joseph with the Wife of Potiphar ====
This painting illustrates the story that Joost van den Vondel wrote about Iempsar, wife of Joseph's patron Potiphar, attempting to seduce the pious Joseph. The scene depicts Joseph rejecting and leaving her. The figures are elegant, but not dramatic, and the classical composition seems to highlight Van Mieris' shortcoming to illustrate the dramatic nature of the story. However, the work was praised by contemporaries.

==== The Death Mouse ====
This painting was started by another painter, Pieter van Singelandt, but was finished by Willem van Mieris after his death. Typical for Van Mieris' work is that the woman is dressed in a rather fashionable manner, creating a striking contrast between the elegant lady in the classical interior and her feeding the cat, an act which befits a maid better. The painting bears an amorous meaning; the woman shows that a thief easily changes into a prey near her. If a man wants to steal a kiss, he will lose his heart.

==== Keuken met Visboer ====
This scene in the shop allows Van Mieris to display his skill at emulating reality in a large variety of subjects. Van Mieris details the different materials, creating a highly lifelike picture, but from a distance they seem to not work very well together. The female figure is rather stiff and doll-like, and the background echoes this in its mechanical nature, which leaves nothing to the imagination. This painting was well received by contemporaries, and it was viewed as natural and artistic.

=== Sculptures ===
It is not well known that Willem van Mieris worked with multiple media: not only painting. In fact he also worked as a designer and molder of sculptures. His career as a sculptor was, however, a short one: he only worked for a few years at the beginning of the 18th century. Nevertheless, he still did a good job that surpass his paintings in quality. The only work that has come down to us are four vases commissioned by his patron Pieter de la Court van der Voort, which were designed for the garden of his Leiden mansion. The De la Court family had an avid interest in gardening (they introduced the pineapple to Europe) and art, which explains the extensive attention for decoration of the garden. Eleven preparatory drawings for the four vases made by Willem van Mieris have been mentioned in an inventory of the collection of Pieter de la Court's son Allard and two decades later in the auction catalogue of his widow Catherina de la Court-Backer. Willemijn Fock was able to identify six of these drawings and noticed that four vases decorating the gardens of Windsor Castle in England were signed "W. van Mieris inv[enit] et fecit" and Roman numerals state the year of production. After comparison of the drawings and the actual vases, there was no doubt that these were commissioned by Pieter de la Court and to later be acquired by the British royal family in 1825. The four vases portray the four seasons and the shape of the vases are classically inspired on the Medici-vase and the Borghese-vase, but also after the vases of the Versailles palace. The seasonal division is quite traditional, going back to classical literature. Willem van Mieris is likely to have read the translation of Cesare Ripa's Iconologia and represented spring with sacrifice to Flora and Priapus, summer with the bath of Diana and a sacrifice to Ceres, autumn with a parade for Bacchus, and winter with Venus ordering weapons for Aeneas and warming herself to a fire after Ceres and Bacchus leave her. Willem van Mieris always carefully prepared his paintings in order to find the right composition and to study certain elements. Two of his spring drawings can be considered the most carefully done and may be the best work in his large oeuvre of drawings. For the vases, as a source of inspiration he used both his own work and the works of others, both Dutch and Italian, that was brought to him by De la Court especially for this project. He probably used works of Rembrandt and the Flemish Francis van Bossuit. The drawings and actual vases are not a perfect match: the composition differs at times especially by the omittance of figures or details (often because of lack of space or because of lack of space or because the overall picture or story looked better without).

Willem van Mieris was the designer and molder of the reliefs. He collaborated with his friend Filips van der Mij, who was responsible for the casting, and his son Hieronimus van der Mij would later study under van Mieris. The feet and lids of the vases were made by Giovanni Battista Lurago under the supervision of van Mieris.

Allard de la Court also commissioned van Mieris a fountain piece, again in collaboration with Filips van der Mij. The sculpture has been destroyed, but the receipts of the purchase give a detailed description of the work: Hercules strangling the head of a serpent while holding it up. The water sprayed out of the serpent's mouth. However, the fountain has not come down to us, making the vases the only pieces of sculpture by Willem van Mieris that we can admire today.

== Criticism and appreciation ==
Willem van Mieris succeeded in achieving remarkable popularity in the Netherlands, with his paintings hanging in the collections of many eminent members of the Dutch new aristocracy as well as of foreign noblemen such as the Duke of Mecklenburg-Schwerin. However, his reputation was not held in as high esteem when it comes to later art critics: Dezallier d'Argenville, though recognizing the ability of Van Mieris as a painter, states in his Abrégé that he was never able to match the level of his father, Frans van Mieris the Elder, whose fame was still celebrated in Europe when Willem painted his major works. This opinion was reflected in the foreign market as well, as this anecdote describes; Pieter de la Court van der Voort (1664–1739) was travelling through France in 1700, intending to sell a work by Willem van Mieris. He covered up the artist's signature to hide the fact that it was a work by Willem, not his father Frans van Mieris, as the value of the painting would be drastically lowered when it would be known that it was the son who painted it.

Much harsher is the opinion of Théophile Thoré, the major critic of Dutch art in the 19th century: in his Musées de la Hollande, a catalogue of the most important works of art exposed in the Netherlands, the French connoisseur blatantly despised Willem van Mieris, labeling his paintings as "harsh, cold, piddling, and unsurpassably insipid". All things considered, no other kind of statement could be expected from Thoré on a painter such as Van Mieris: the Dutch painter embodied the new, classicizing tendency of Dutch art in the 18th century, a tendency that Thoré viewed as the death and destruction of the Golden Age. In fact, the French critic idealized Dutch 17th-century painting as the most complete expression of freedom and independence ever achieved by European art, with Rembrandt and Vermeer as icons of a popular, real and truthful way of painting. On the other hand, the Leiden fijnschilders and the Italianate painters were regarded as traitors of this exceptional artistic movement, being still imprisoned by the old and aristocratic canons of classicizing beauty.

== Works ==
- Lady with Parrot (1685)
- The Escaped Bird (1687)
- A Seated Man (1688)
- Cimon and Iphigeneia (1698)
- Family Reunion (17th century)
- Diana and her Nymphs (1702)
- A Gentleman Offering a Lady a Bunch of Grapes (1707)
- A Poultry Seller (1707)
- The Apothecary (1710)
- Man with Pipe (1710)
- The Lute Player (1711)
- Expulsion of Hagar (1724)
- The Spinner (first half of the 18th century)
- Interior with a Mother Attending her Children (1728)
- An Old Man Reading (1729)
- Green Grocer (1731), oil onwood, 40 x 34 cm, Wallace Collection, London
- Ecce Homo (18th century)
- Suzanna and the Elders after Francis van Bossuit, Detroit Institute of Arts, displayed there as of 1909
Selected paintings by Willem van Mieris

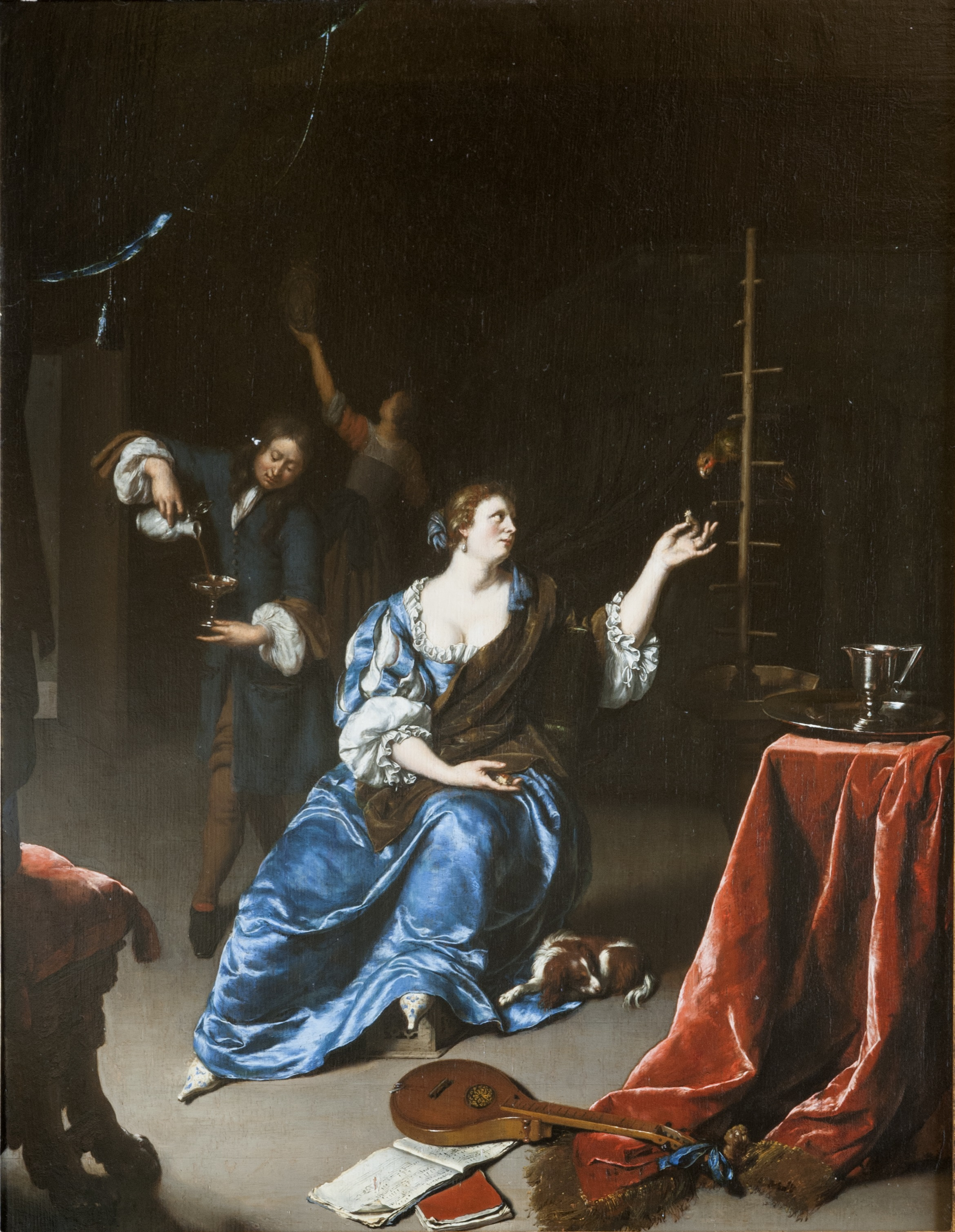
Lady with Parrot (1685)

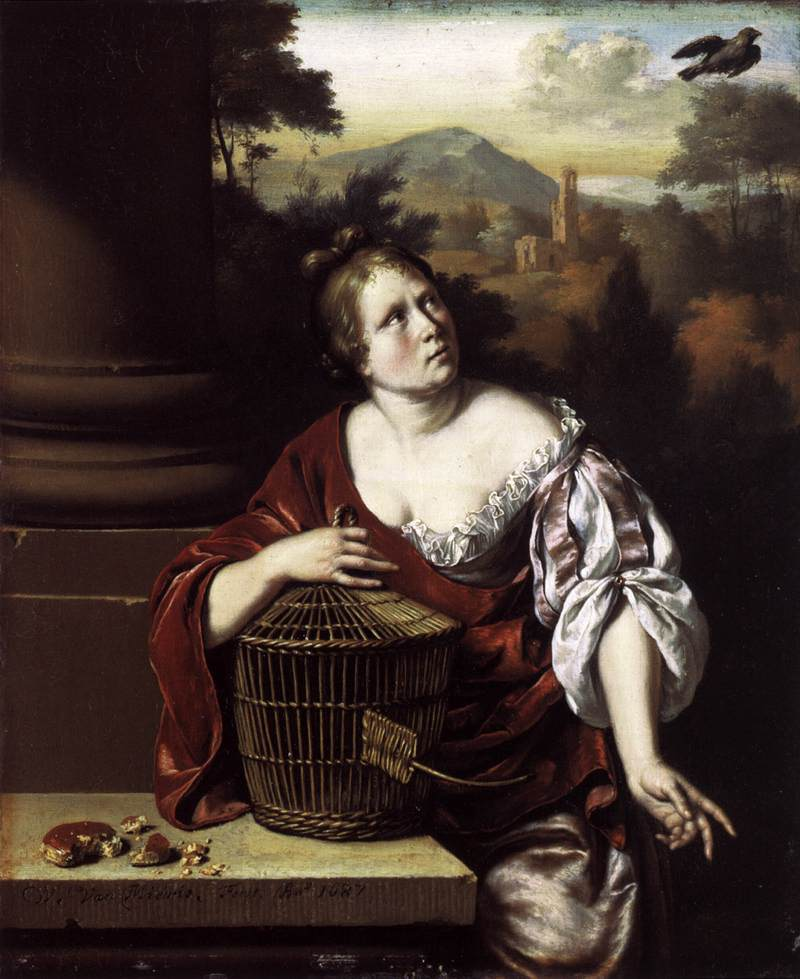
The Escaped Bird (1687)

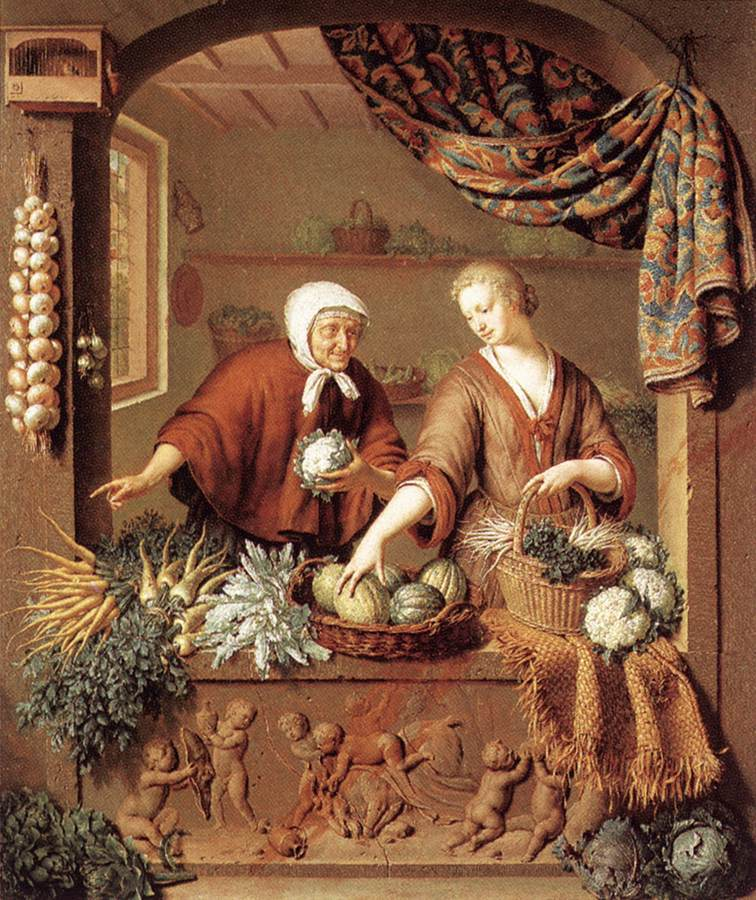
The Greengrocer (1731)

== Works after the painter ==
- Portrait of Willem van Mieris, painted by Taco Hajo Jeigersma
