= Frans van Mieris =

Frans van Mieris is the name of:

- Frans van Mieris the Elder (1635–1681), Dutch painter
- Frans van Mieris the Younger (1689–1763), his grandson, Dutch painter
