= Young Woman Stringing Pearls =

Painting by Frans van Mieris the Elder

Young Woman Stringing Pearls (1658) by Frans Mieris the Elder

Young Woman Stringing Pearls is a 1658 painting by the Dutch artist Frans van Mieris the Elder. It has been in the collection of the Musée Fabre, in Montpellier, France, since 1836.
