= A Cavalier =

1657 painting by Frans van Mieris the Elder

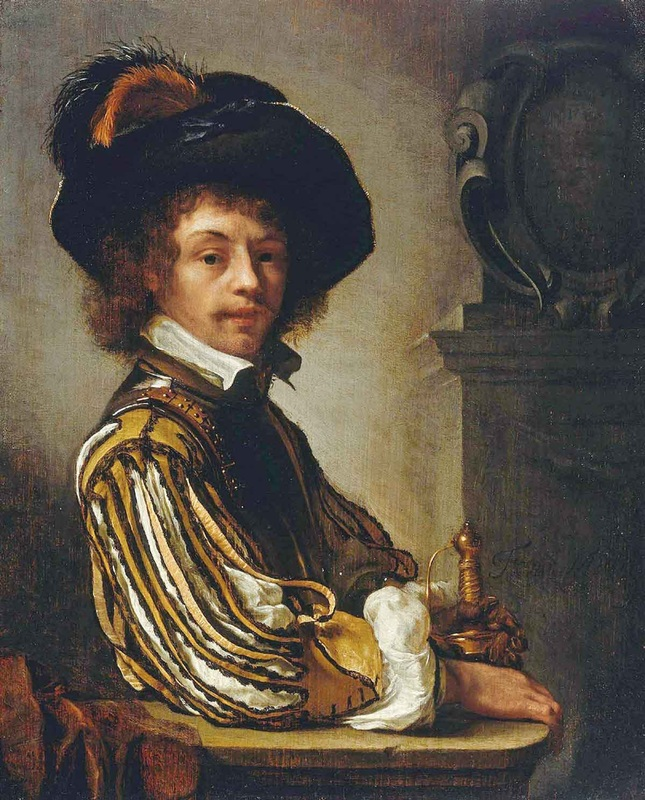
A Cavalier (1657) by Frans van Mieris the Elder

A Cavalier is a 1657 oil on canvas self-portrait by the Dutch artist Frans van Mieris. In 2007 it was stolen from the Art Gallery of New South Wales and has not yet been recovered. It is one of the FBI's "Top Ten Art Crimes" and has an estimated value of about $1 million.
