= Pieter Leermans =

Dutch Golden Age painter

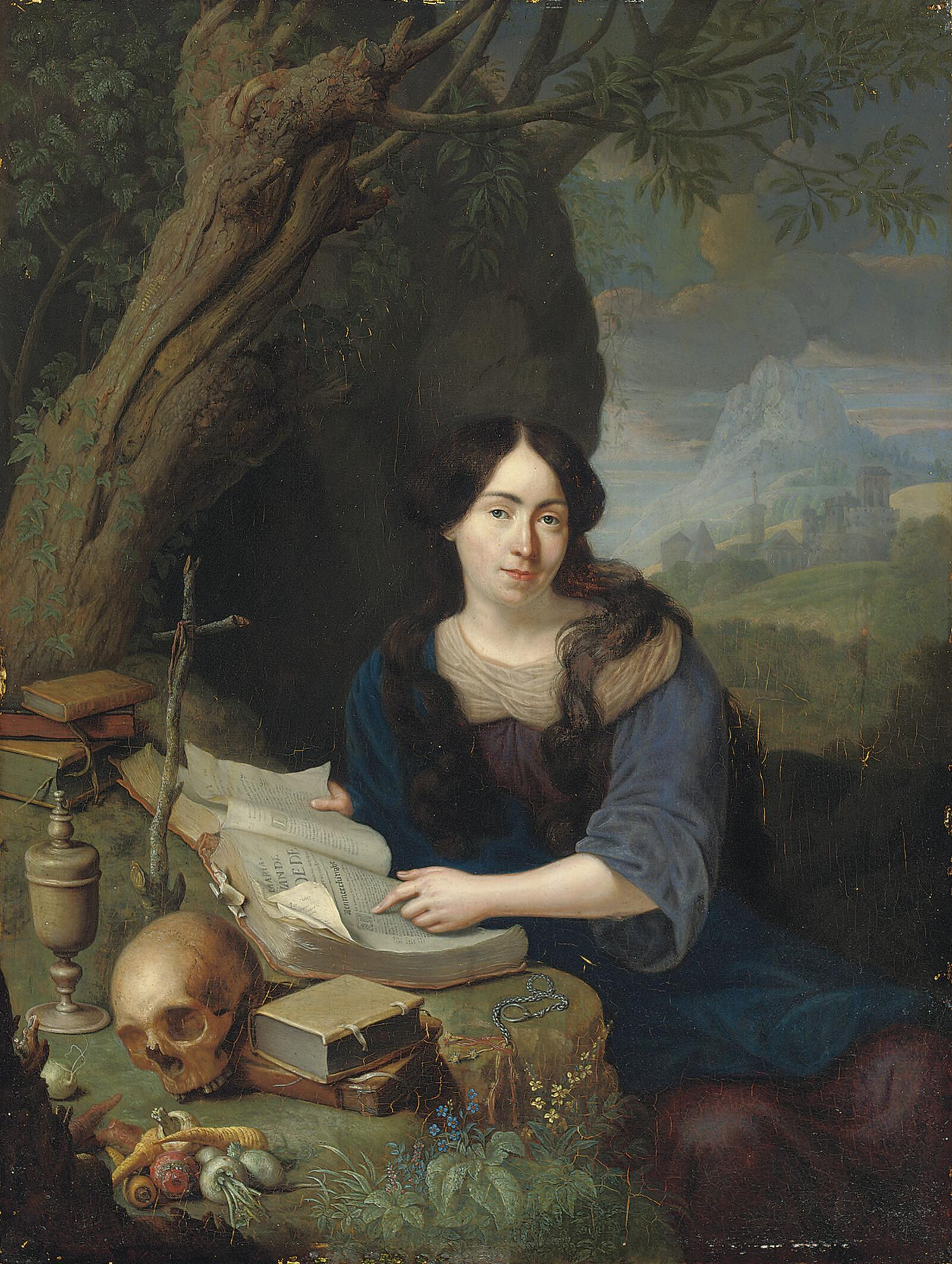
Portrait of unknown lady as Mary Magdalene, possibly Maria van Oosterwijk, 1649-1682

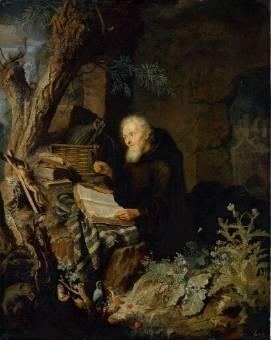
The Hermit, Gemäldegalerie Alte Meister

Pieter Leermans (c. 1635, Leiden – 1706), was a Dutch Golden Age painter.

== Biography ==
According to the Netherlands Institute for Art History he was a portrait painter of historical allegories. He is also known as Lieremans.

Little is known of his life, but he is considered to be one of the Leiden fijnschilders, as his "Hermit" in Dresden shows Gerard Dou's influence.
