= Frans van Mieris the Younger =

Dutch painter

Frans Mieris
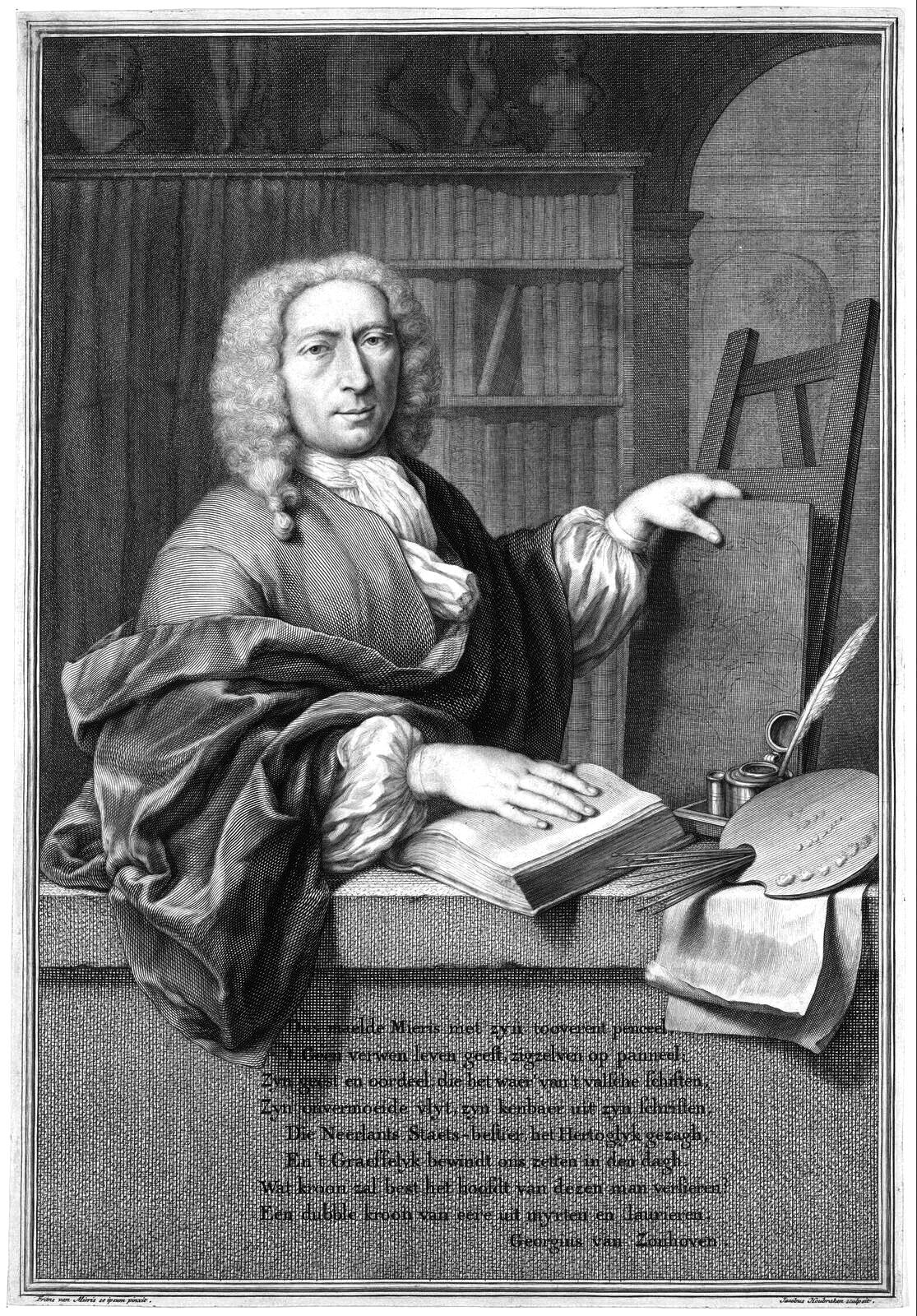
- Frans van Mieris (II) (Jacob Houbraken)
- Born: 24 November 1689; Leiden, Holland, The Netherlands
- Died: 24 November 1763 (aged 74); Leiden, Holland, The Netherlands
- Parent: Willem Mieris

Frans van Mieris the Younger (24 November 1689 – 22 October 1763) was a Dutch painter. He was born in Leiden, the son of Willem van Mieris, and continued in the artistic traditions of his grandfather, also named Frans and known as Frans van Mieris the Elder. Willem passed down his painting studio to his son Frans. However, neither Willem nor Frans the Younger achieved the same level of artistic renown as Frans the Elder. Frans Mieris the Younger died in Leiden.

== Works ==
=== Paintings ===
- Rev. dr. Cox Macro (1703–1715)
- Flower (1720)
- Old Peasant Holding a Jug (1731)
- Old Man With the Book
- Three Generations (1742)
- Portrait of Pieter de la Court (1750)
- Portrait of Andreas Weiss (1752)

=== Engravings ===
- Gerard van Loon (c. 1704–1763)
