= Frans van Mieris the Elder =

Dutch painter (1635–1681)

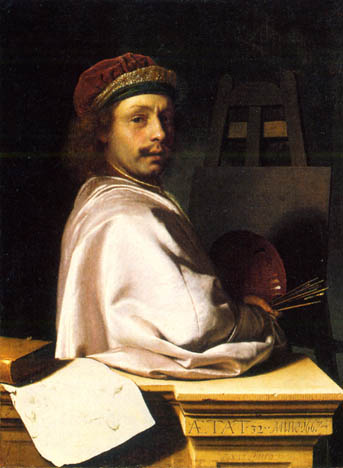
- The Artist as Virtuoso at His Easel: Self Portrait, Aged 32 (1667)
- Born: Frans van Mieris; 16 April 1635; Leiden, Dutch Republic
- Died: 12 March 1681 (aged 45); Leiden, Dutch Republic
- Known for: Painting
- Movement: Baroque

Frans van Mieris the Elder (16 April 1635 – 12 March 1681), was a Dutch Golden Age genre and portrait painter. The leading member of a Leiden family of painters, his sons Jan (1660–1690) and Willem (1662–1747) and his grandson Frans van Mieris the Younger (1689–1763) were also accomplished genre painters.

== Biography ==
Young Woman Stringing Pearls by Frans van Mieris sr. (1658)

Frans was born and died in Leiden, where his father Jan Bastiaans van Mieris was a goldsmith, carver of rubies and diamond setter. His father wished to train him to his own business, but Frans preferred drawing, and studied with Dutch Golden Age painter Jacob Toorenvliet's father, Abraham Toorenvliet, a glazier who kept a school of design. From his own father's shop he became familiar with the ways and dress of people of distinction. His eye was fascinated in turn by the sheen of jewelry and stained glass; and, though he soon left Toorenvliet for the workshops of Gerard Dou and Abraham van den Tempel, he acquired the Leiden fijnschilder manner over the Amsterdam finish of the disciples of Rembrandt.

He seldom chose panels of which the size exceeded 12 to 15 inches, and whenever his name is attached to a picture above that size, it is reasonable to assign it to his son Willem or to some other imitator. Unlike Dou when he first left Rembrandt, or Jan Steen when he started on an independent career, Mieris never ventured to design figures as large as life. Characteristic of his art in its minute proportions is a shiny brightness and metallic polish.

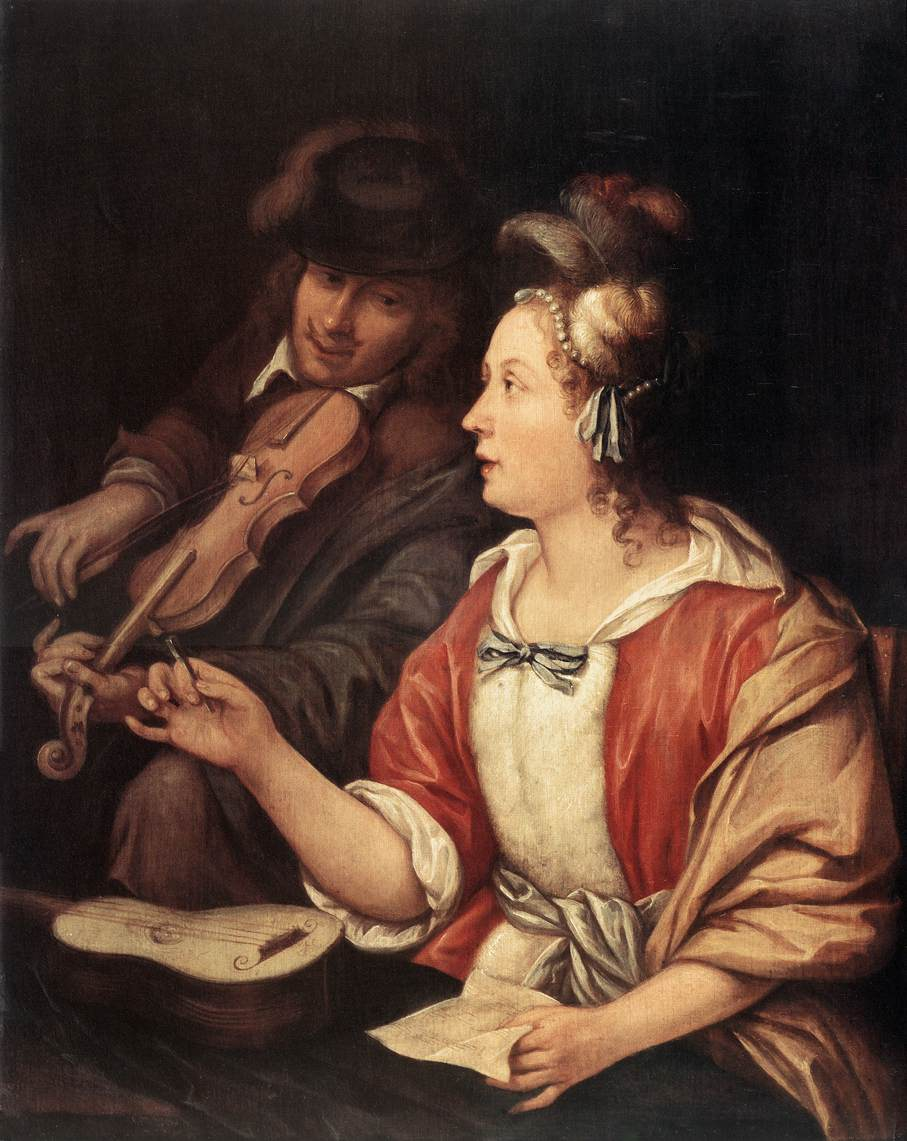
The Music Lesson, National Museum of Serbia, Belgrade

The subjects which he treated best are those in which he illustrated the habits or actions of the wealthier classes; but he sometimes succeeded in homely incidents and in portrait, and not infrequently he ventured on allegory. He repeatedly painted the satin skirt which Ter Borch brought into fashion, and he often rivalled Ter Borch in the faithful rendering of rich and highly coloured woven tissues. But he remained below Ter Borch and Metsu, because he had not their delicate perception of harmony or their charming mellowness of touch and tint, and he fell behind Gerard Dou, because Frans was hard and had not Dou's feeling for effect by concentrated light and shade. In the form of his composition, which sometimes represents the framework of a window enlivened with greenery, and adorned with bas-reliefs within which figures are seen to the waist, his model is certainly Dou.

It is questionable whether Houbraken has accurately recorded this master's birthday. One of his best-known pieces, a party of ladies and gentlemen at an oyster luncheon, in the Hermitage at St Petersburg, bears the date of 1650. Celebrated alike for composition and finish, it would prove that Mieris had reached his prime at the age of fifteen. Another beautiful example, the "Doctor Feeling a Lady's Pulse" in the gallery of Vienna, is dated 1656; and Waagen, in one of his critical essays, justly observes that it is a remarkable production for a youth of twenty-one. In 1657 Mieris was married at Leiden in the presence of Jan Potheuck, a painter, and this is the earliest written record of his existence on which we can implicitly rely. Of the numerous panels by Mieris, at least twenty-nine (such as Young Woman Stringing Pearls) are dated—the latest being an allegory, long in the Ruhl collection at Cologne, illustrating what he considered the kindred vices of drinking, smoking and dicing, in the year 1680.

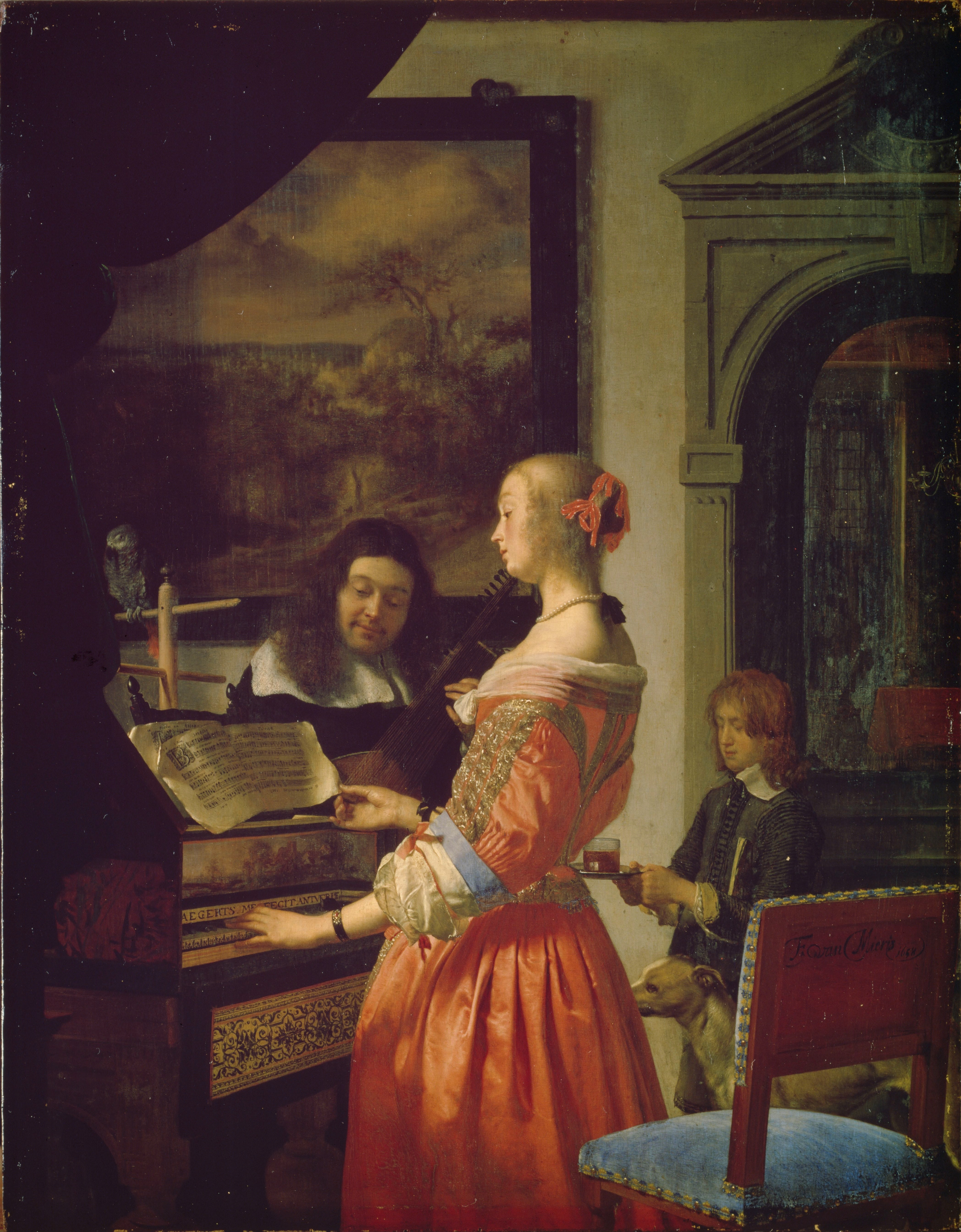
Woman at a harpsichord by Frans van Mieris sr. (1658) Oil on wood, 31.7 x 24.7 cm. Staatliches Museum Schwerin

Mieris had numerous and distinguished patrons. He received valuable commissions from Archduke Leopold, the elector-palatine, and Cosimo III de' Medici, Grand Duke of Tuscany. His practice was large and lucrative, but never engendered in him either carelessness or neglect. If there be a difference between the painter's earlier and later work, it is that the former was clearer and more delicate in flesh, whilst the latter was often darker and more livid in the shadows. When he died his clients naturally went over to his son Willem, who in turn bequeathed his painting-room to his son Frans. But neither Willem nor Frans van Mieris the Younger equalled Frans the elder.

The pictures of all the generations of the Mieris family were successfully imitated by A. D. Snaphaan, who lived at Leipzig and was patronized by the court of Anhalt-Dessau. To those who would study his deceptive form of art a visit to the collection of Wörlitz near Dessau may afford instruction.

== Other notable works ==
=== Allegory of Painting ===
Allegory of Painting
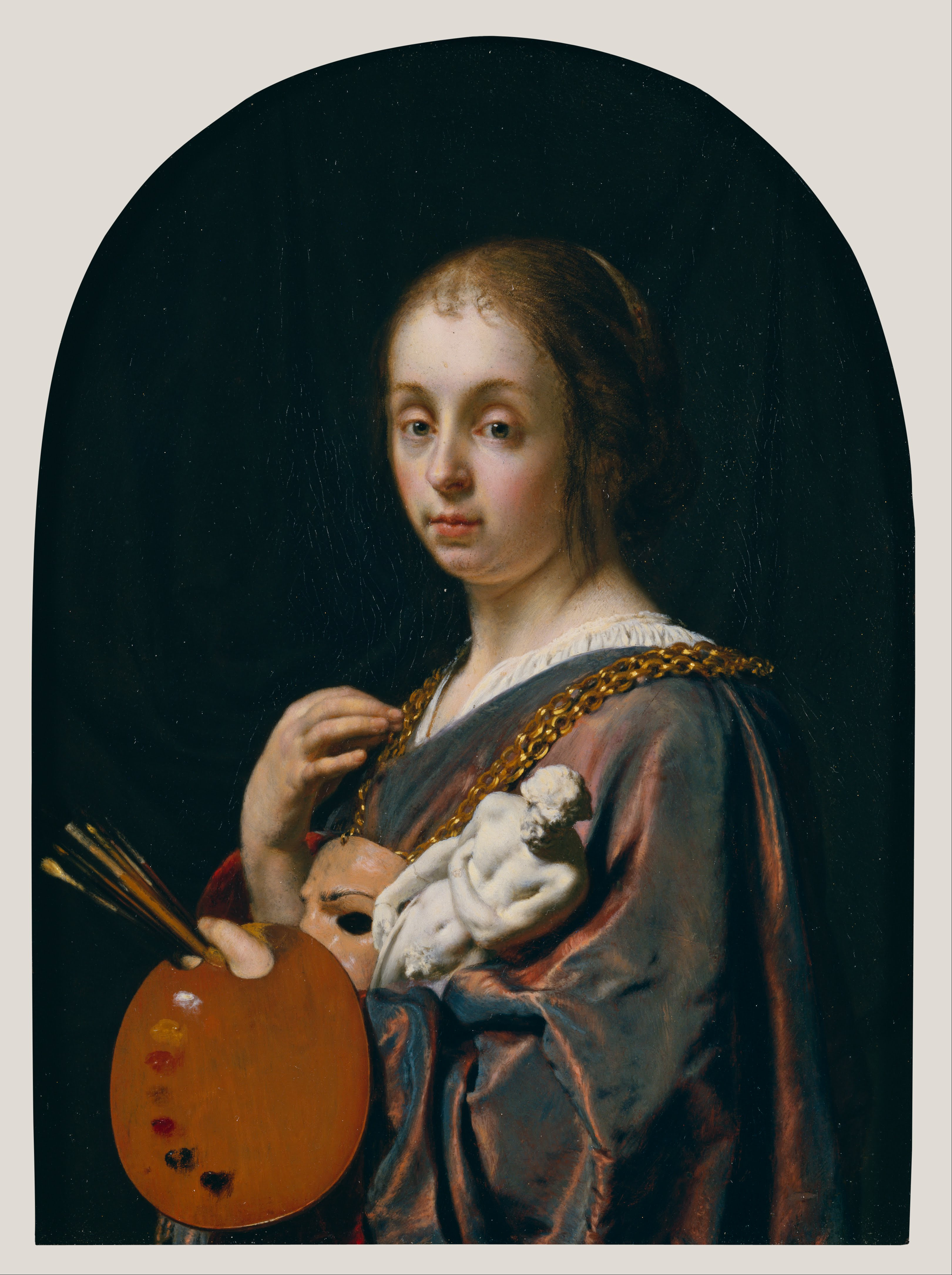
- Artist: Frans van Mieris the Elder
- Year: c. 1661
- Type: oil on copper
- Dimensions: 89 cm × 127 cm (35 in × 50 in)
- Location: J. Paul Getty Museum, Los Angeles

Allegory of Painting is an oil on copper painting by van Mieris, executed c. 1661.

Images representing the allegory of art were traditionally used to classify painting among the liberal arts. A woman, usually idealized, personifies Pictura, painting, and holds objects essential to artistic creation. In her left hand, she holds a palette, brushes, and a small plaster sculpture that served as a model for larger works. Around her neck, she wears a mask suspended from a chain, which may symbolize art's power to deceive through illusion. The mask, the gold chain, and the colour-changing robe are the distinctive symbolic attributes of the allegory of Painting described by Cesare Ripa in his 1593 work, Iconologia.

Frans van Mieris the Elder took up the ancient model of Pictura but modernized it. The model is neither classically beautiful nor idealized; she is an ordinary young woman, a figure from everyday Dutch life.

== Theft ==
In early June 2007, A Cavalier (Self Portrait), dated to 1657–1659, was stolen from the Art Gallery of New South Wales in Sydney, Australia. The 20 by 16 cm (7.9 by 6.3 in) painting had been donated to the Art Gallery of NSW in 1993 by media figure and philanthropist, James Fairfax.
