= Fijnschilder =

17th-century Dutch artistic movement

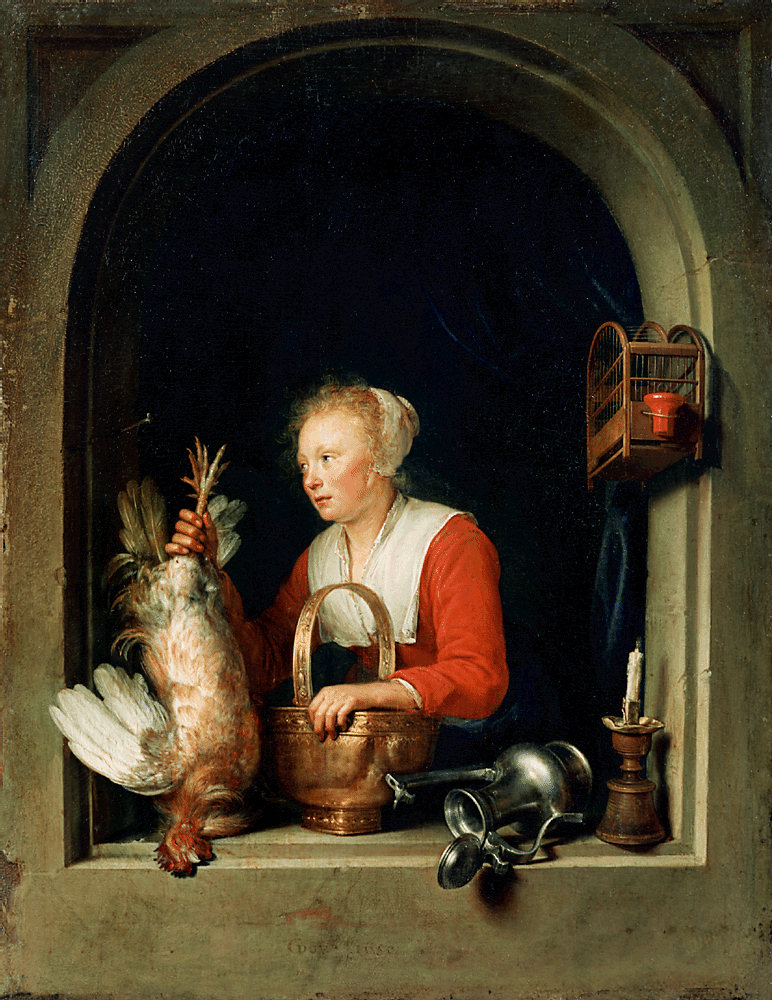
Gerard Dou, The Dutch Housewife, 1650

The Fijnschilders (literally "fine-painters"), also called the Leiden Fijnschilders ('Leidse Fijnschilders'), were Dutch Golden Age painters who, from about 1630 to 1710, strove to create as natural a reproduction of reality as possible in their meticulously executed, often small-scale works.

Although in the seventeenth century, as in modern Dutch, the term fijnschilder was used to differentiate between a painter practicing classic techniques and one who, for instance, is a house painter, in the nineteenth century it became a label for artists like Gerrit Dou and his followers in Leiden. Dou, Frans van Mieris, Sr. and Adriaen van der Werff—all among the most successful of the Dutch Baroque—became identifiable by their "fine" manner, exquisite techniques, and extreme attention to detail resulting in works with smooth surfaces completely lacking painterly brush strokes. The application of paint contrasts with the textures and style of other Dutch painters, such as Frans Hals and Dou's teacher Rembrandt van Rijn. In this way they have more in common with earlier traditions in Netherlandish painting, such as the detailed richness of Jan van Eyck. Other artists working in the style include Godfried Schalcken, Quirijn van Brekelenkam, Pieter Leermans and, at times, Gabriel Metsu.

The fijnschilders are best known for genre scenes showing everyday life and activities, candle-lit nocturnal subjects, and trompe-l'œil "niche" paintings.

Notable examples

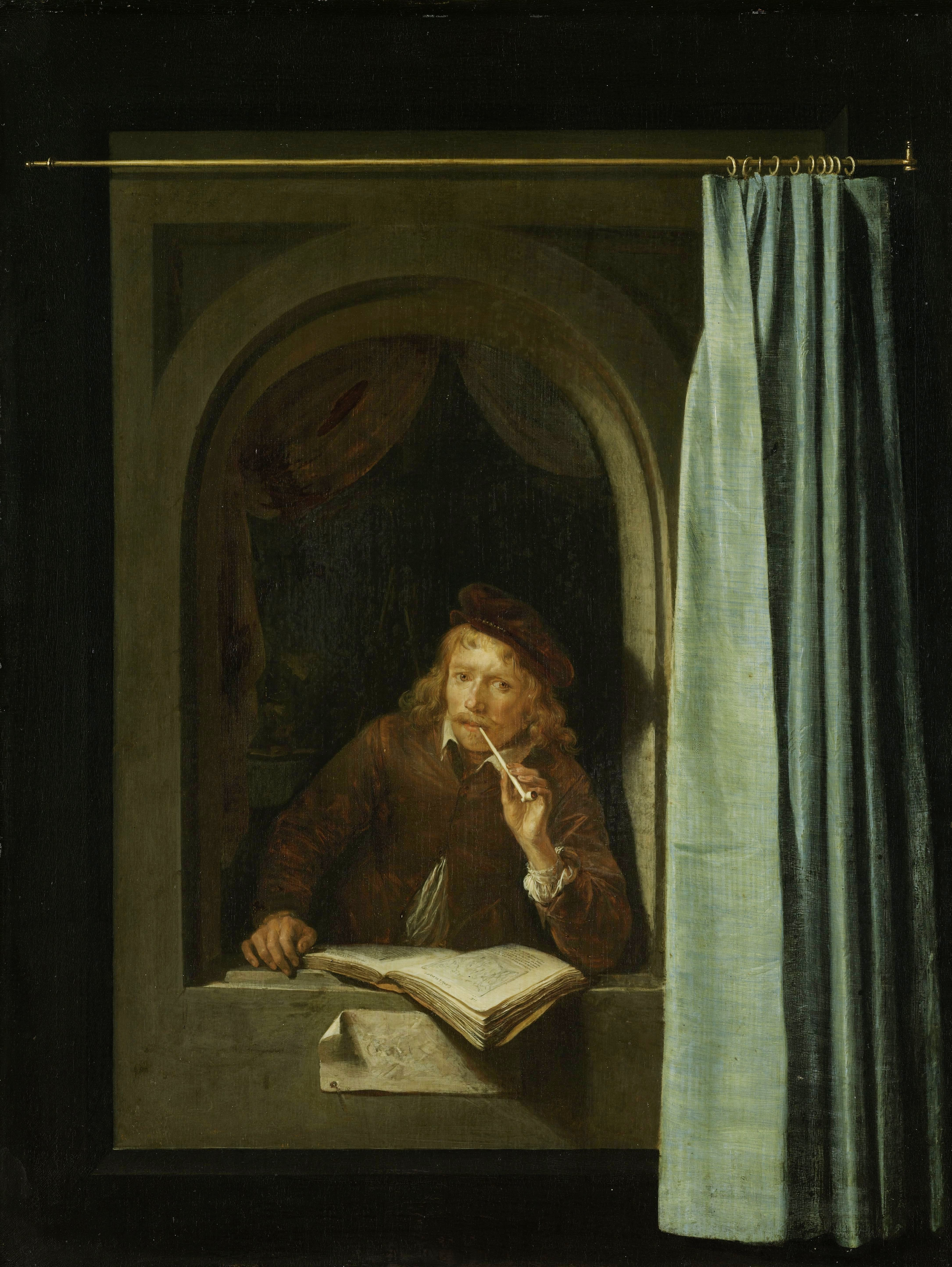
Gerrit Dou, Self portrait, c. 1650

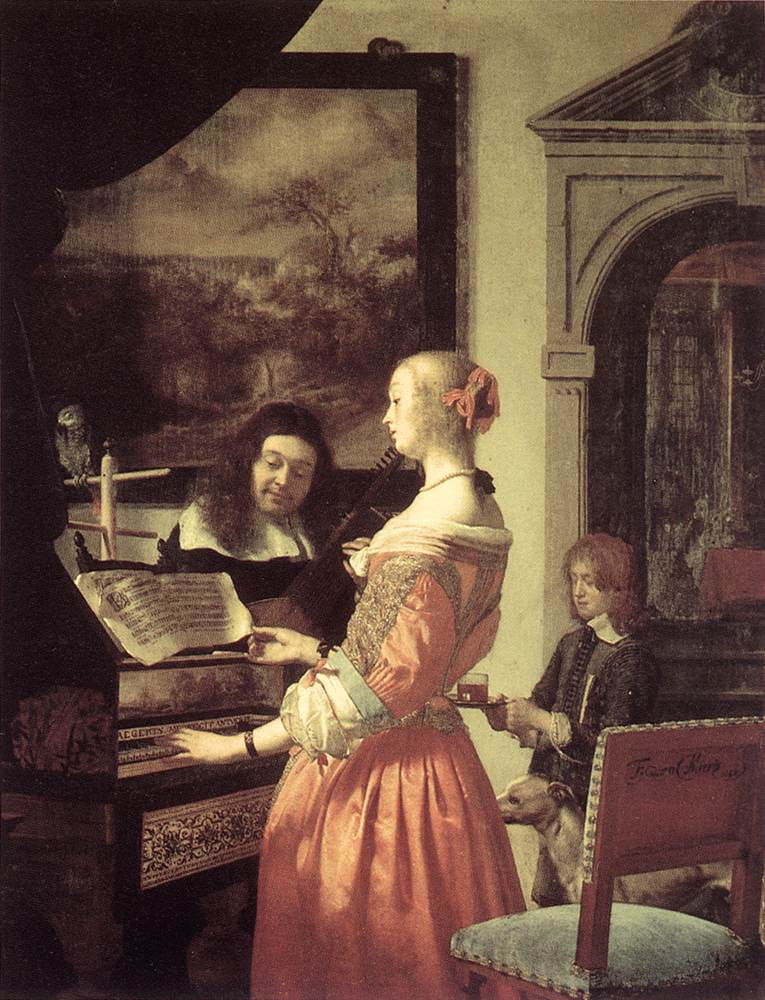
Frans van Mieris, The Duet, 1658

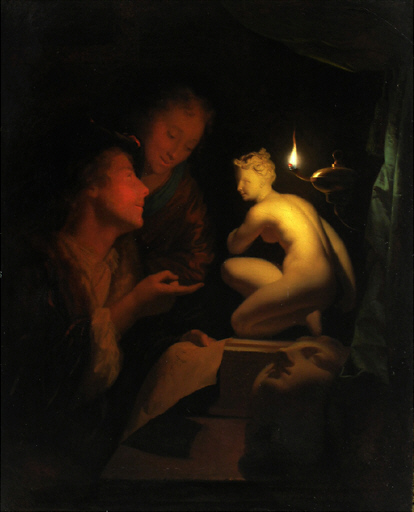
Godfried Schalcken, Two men examining a sculpture by candlelight
