= Pieter de la Court =

Dutch economist and businessman (1618–1685)

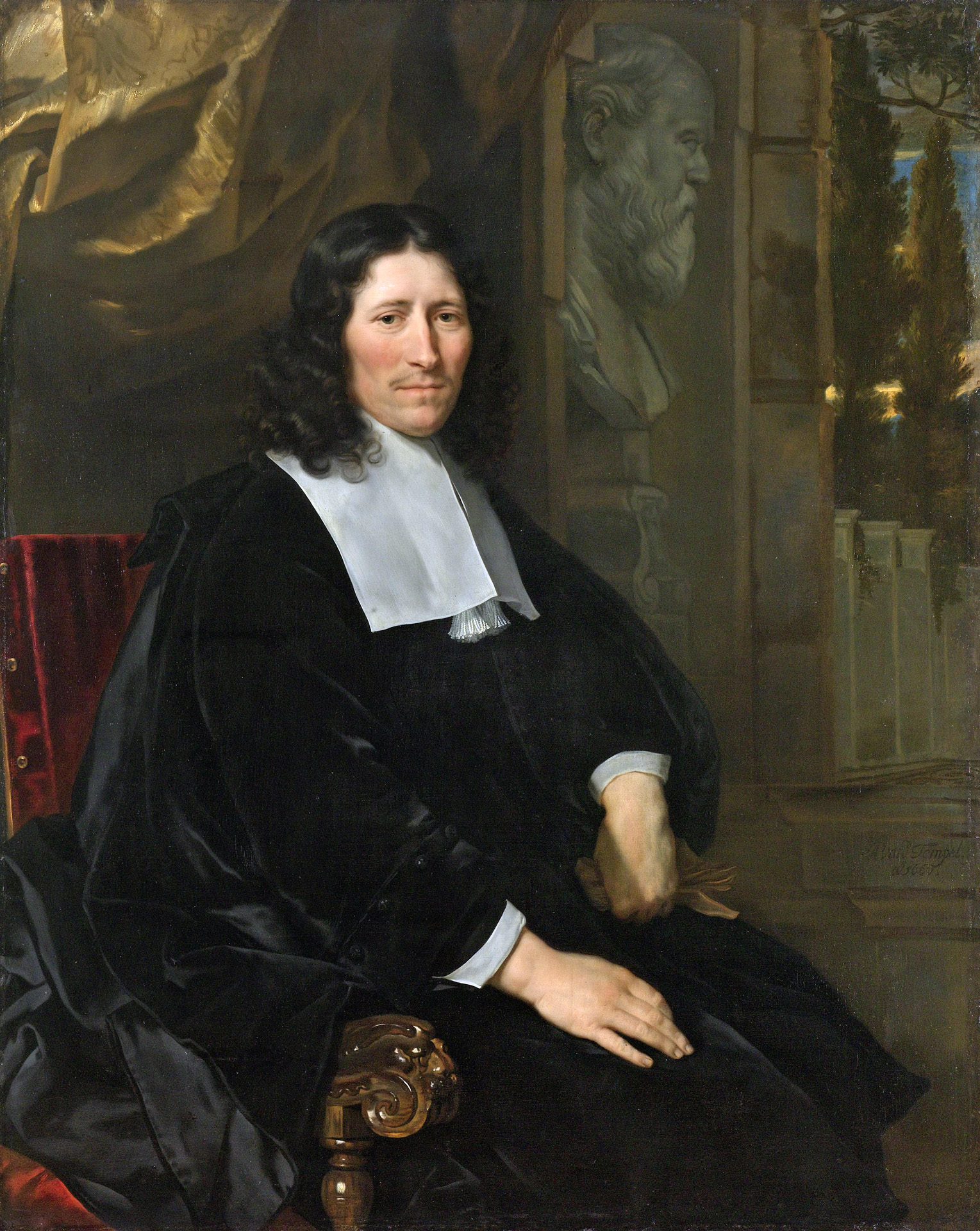
Portrait by Abraham van den Tempel, 1667

Pieter de la Court (1618 – May 28, 1685) was a Dutch economist and businessman, he is the progenitor of the De la Court family. He thought about the economic importance of free competition and was an advocate of the republican form of government.

== Biography ==
Pieter de la Court was born in Leiden, the son of Pieter de la Court the Elder and Jeanne des Planques. His parents were Protestant immigrants from Flanders, who settled in Leiden around 1613 in order to be able to practise their faith and to profit from the rapid expansion of Leiden as the world centre of cloth manufacturing. Pieter de la Court the Elder was a successful cloth merchant before he arrived in Leiden. His wife also came from a family of wealthy cloth manufacturers. They had established themselves as members of the local economic elite by the time Pieter was born. The couple had three other children; Jacob (born 1617), Johanna (born 1620) and Johan (1622–1660). Johan is generally seen as the author of at least two of the books that have later been ascribed to Pieter.

De la Court studied at Leiden University and completed his education with a Grand Tour through Europe in 1641–1643. He went to London, Saumur (France), Geneva and Basel. The diary he kept during his journey has been preserved and was published in 1928. After returning to Leiden, De la Court entered his father's profession and set up a cloth trading firm with his brother Johan. By 1650 the firm of the two brothers had evolved into one of the leading cloth operations in the city.

In spite of his immigrant background, De la Court was able to penetrate the social elite of Holland. He became a close friend of Johan Eleman, who was a member of Leiden's governing council and a relative of Johan de Witt (1625–72), the de facto leader of the Dutch Republic between 1653 and 1672. In 1657 De la Court married Eleman's sister-in-law, Elisabeth Tollenaer, who died only one year later in childbirth. In 1660 De la Court's younger brother and business partner Johan died. Pieter was married again in 1661, this time to Catharina van der Voort, the sister of two wealthy Amsterdam merchants and, again, a relative of Johan de Witt.

It was in this turbulent period of De la Court's life that he published almost all of his books about the political economy of Holland and the larger Dutch Republic. In the preface to the Interest van Holland, the most renowned of these books, he explicitly ascribed this publishing frenzy to the need to distract his mind from the tragedy that had hit him. The centerpiece of this body of work was the Interest of Holland, published in 1662. It contained a critical analysis of the economic success of the Dutch Republic and demonstrated how this success had been brought about by the combined effects of free competition and free (i.e. republican) government. It became a bestseller overnight. In Holland the Interest van Holland gained notoriety and infamy as a republican manifesto. Abroad the Interest was widely translated and read as an explanatory guide to the miraculous economic success of the Dutch.

De la Court's second wife Catharina van der Voort (1622–74) had two children, Magdalena (1662) and Pieter (1664–1739), later named Pieter de la Court van der Voort, who became later known as a greenhouse gardener and the most successful exotic fruit grower of his time. In 1665 the family moved from Leiden to Amsterdam, by then the undisputed centre of world trade. There De la Court expanded the scope of his business activities by participating in the ventures of his two brothers in law.

De la Court became the leader of a consortium of Amsterdam merchants who sought to break the monopoly of the Dutch East India Company on all trade with the Dutch East Indies. The group filed petitions which claimed that the monopoly was limited to the trade route around the Cape of Good Hope. In 1668 they actually sent an exploratory vessel to the Arctic to find a shipping route around Siberia. The endeavour failed but shows De la Court was an advocate of free trade in theory and practice.

De la Court's publishing activity had made him a well known protagonist of the republican "party" in contemporary Dutch politics. This group, consisting primarily of the wealthy businessmen in the cities of Holland and led by Johan de Witt, effectively ran the Dutch Republic from 1650 until 1672. They strongly opposed the political powers and ambitions of the House of Orange-Nassau which usually held the office of Stadholder, a pseudo-royal position that somehow survived in the otherwise republican institutions of the Dutch Republic, except during this First Stadtholderless Period. De la Court was probably never close to Johan de Witt, but it has been established that De Witt was actively involved in the writing of De la Court's most outspoken and most widely read text, the Interest van Holland.

When the Orangist faction regained control of the country in 1672, Johan de Witt was lynched by an Orangist mob and Pieter de la Court fled to Antwerp where he stayed with his brother in law Guglielmo van der Voort. He returned to Amsterdam in 1673 where he lived as a merchant until his death in 1685. The last book that was published by De la Court appeared in 1669. A final work, the Sinryke Fabulen, was published posthumously in 1685.

== Works ==
De la Court's works were published anonymously, but contemporaries immediately identified Pieter de la Court as the author of most of them. It is now generally believed that some of these books were actually written by his brother, Johan, and that at least one other title was the work of his business friend Johan Uytenhage de Mist. It has been established as a fact that Johan de Witt and a number of other government officials contributed to the Interest van Holland. De la Court's oeuvre can be divided into three groups of titles.

=== Political economy ===
The Interest van Holland was published in 1662 and immediately became a bestseller in Holland and later also elsewhere. The book contained an analysis of the miraculous economic success of Holland, the leading province of the Dutch Republic, and then set out to establish the economic and political principles on which that success was based. De la Court identified free competition and the republican form of government as the leading factors contributing to the wealth and power of his home country. The book was written in an outspoken and polemic style and went through eight editions in 1662. A revised luxury edition appeared in 1669. It was translated into German in 1665, English in 1702 and French in 1709. A new English translation appeared as late as 1746.

=== Political theory ===
In 1660 De la Court published the Consideratien van Staet (Considerations of State), followed in 1662 by the Politike Discoursen. Both titles seek to establish a theoretical basis for the superiority of the republican form of government. Although the texts share the Interest's republican penchant, they have an altogether different nature. The tone is subdued and the style philosophical with extensive references to other political theorists. Both texts are now thought to have been written by De la Court's brother Johan.

=== Political pamphlets ===
The third and most extensive part of De la Court's work is the series of republican and anti-monarchist pamphlets he published in 1662 and 1663. The most well-known are the Historie der gravelike regering in Holland (History of the counts of Holland) and De stadthouderlijcke regeeringe in Hollandt ende West-Vrieslandt (History of the stadholders of Holland and West-Friesland). Both books contain vivid albeit rather one-sided descriptions of the damage that had been done to the country by monarchical leaders since the Middle Ages.

== Literature ==
The text of the last English edition of the Interest can be downloaded from the website of the Liberty Fund: Pieter de la Court, The True Interest and Political Maxims, of the Republic of Holland (1662). The leading source on De la Court's life and works is Ivo W. Wildenberg, Johan & Pieter de la Court (Amsterdam & Maarssen, 1986).
