= Scottish trade in the Middle Ages =

Trade in medieval Scotland

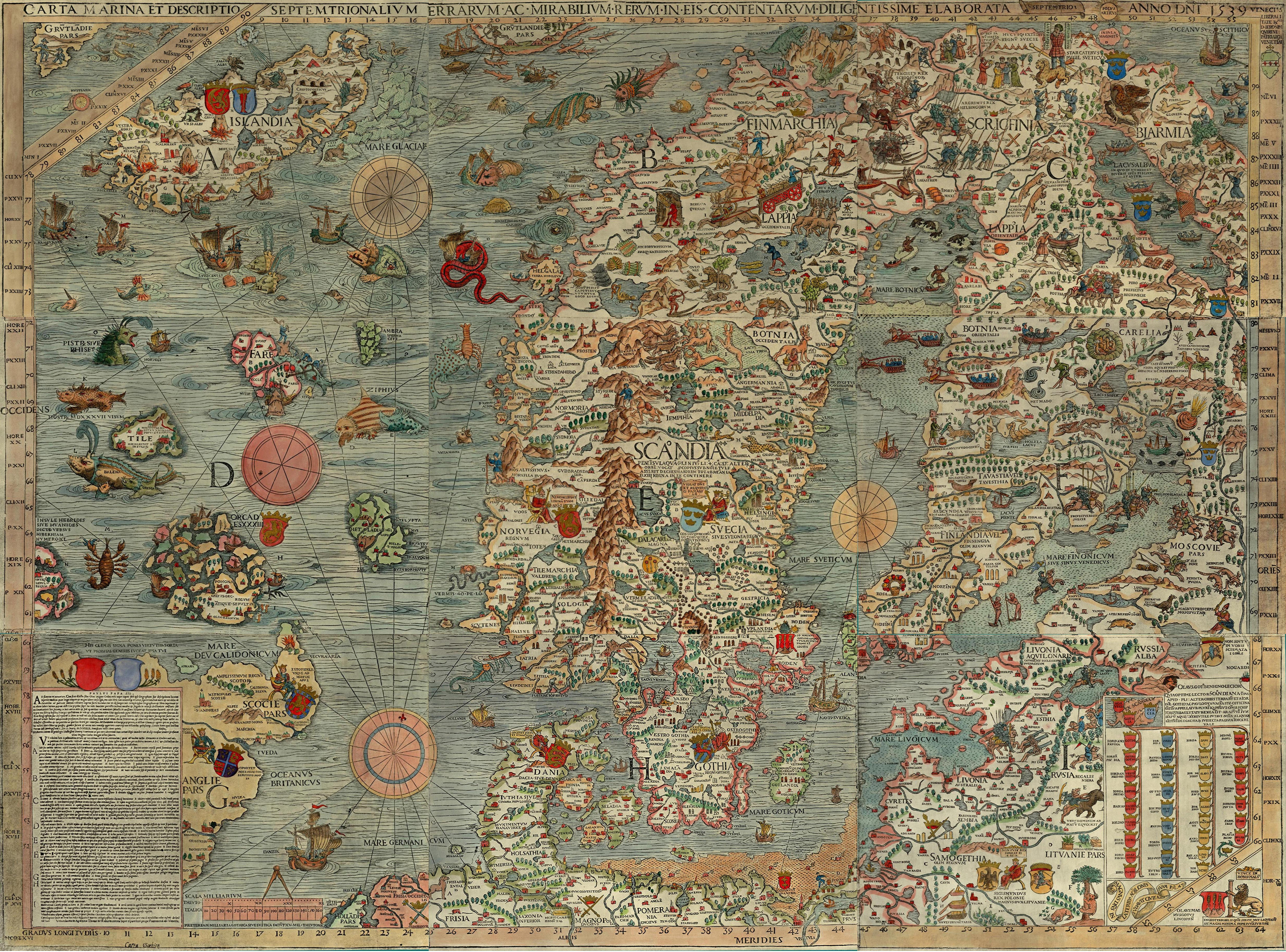
Carta marina by Olaus Magnus, showing many of Scotland's major trading partners. Scotland is shown bottom left

The information about Scotland's domestic and foreign trade during the Middle Ages is limited. In the early Middle Ages the rise of Christianity meant that wine and precious metals were imported for use in religious rites. Imported goods found in archaeological sites of the period include ceramics and glass, while many sites indicate iron and precious metal working. The slave trade was also important and in the Irish Sea it may have been stimulated by the arrival of the Vikings from the late eighth century.

In the High Middle Ages there was an increasing amount of foreign trade. The increased marine exploitation of the Highlands and Islands may have been as a result of the arrival of Scandinavian settlers in this period. From the reign of David I, there are records of burghs, towns that were granted certain legal privileges from the crown. They were able to impose tolls and fines on traders within a region outside their settlements and their growth was facilitated by trade with the continent. The most important exports were unprocessed raw materials, including wool, hides, salt, fish, animals and coal, while Scotland remained frequently short of wood, iron and, in years of bad harvests, grain. Coins replaced barter goods, with Scottish coins being struck from the reign of David I. Until the disruption caused by the outbreak of the Wars of Independence in the early fourteenth century, most naval trade was probably coastal and most foreign trade was with England, but the disruption of this era encouraged the opening up of new markets on the continent.

The main continental trading partners of Scottish burghs were merchants in Flanders. Before 1321 Scottish merchants had established a staple in Bruges. The staple was moved to Middelburg in Zeeland several times in the fifteenth century. Although Bruges remained the major trading partner, from the 1460s trade also developed with Veere, Bergen op Zoom and Antwerp. Wool and hides were the major exports in the late Middle Ages. The disruption of the Wars of Independence meant that this fell in the period 1341–42 to 1342–43, but trade recovered to reach a peak in the 1370s. The introduction of sheep-scab was a serious blow to the wool trade from the early fifteenth century. Despite a leveling off, there was another drop in exports as the markets collapsed in the early-sixteenth century Low Countries. Unlike in England, this did not prompt the Scots to turn to large scale cloth production and only poor quality rough cloths seem to have been significant. There was an increased demand in Scotland for luxury goods, that largely had to be imported, leading to a chronic shortage of bullion. This, and perennial problems in royal finance, led to several debasements of the coinage. The heavily debased "black money", introduced in 1480, had to be withdrawn two years later and may have helped fuel a financial and political crisis.

== Early Middle Ages ==
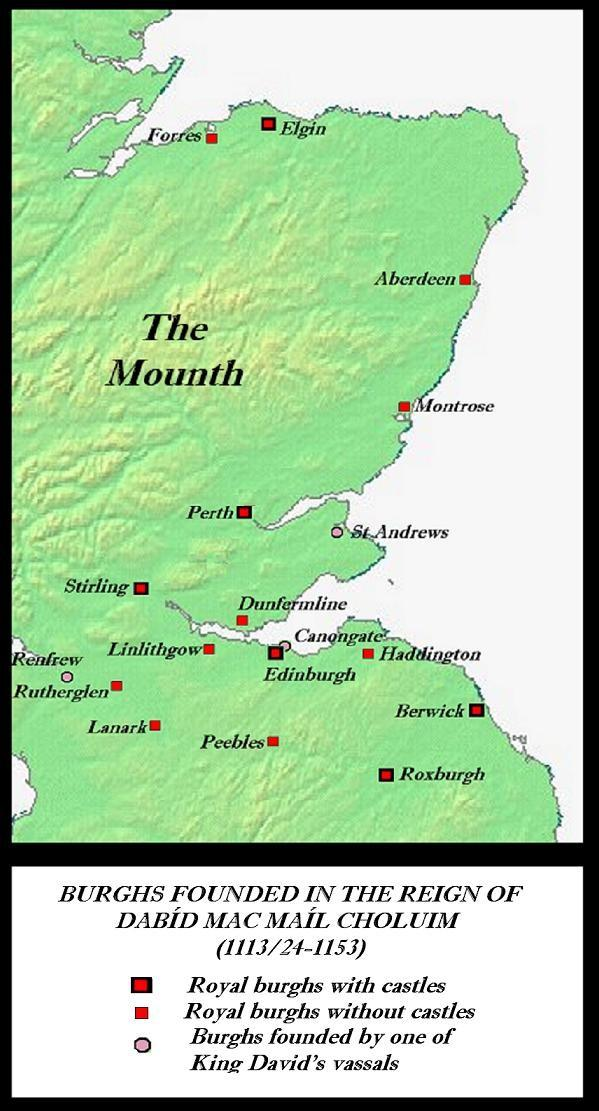
Burghs established before 1153

There are not the detailed custom accounts for most of the period that exist for England, that can provide an understanding of foreign trade, with the first records for Scotland dating to the 1320s. Anecdotal and archaeological evidence gives some indication of the nature of trade for the early Middle Ages. The rise of Christianity meant that wine and precious metals were imported for use in religious rites and there are occasional references to journeys to and from foreign countries, such as the incident recorded by Adomnán in which St Columba went to a port to await ships bearing news, and presumably other items, from Italy. Imported goods found in archaeological sites of the period include ceramics and glass, while many sites indicate iron and precious metal working. The slave trade was also important, with most rural households containing some slaves. Kings are often mentioned raiding for slaves. A letter of St. Patrick indicates that the Picts were buying slaves from Britons in what is now southern Scotland. The slave trade in the Irish Sea may have been stimulated by the arrival of the Vikings from the late eighth century.

== High Middle Ages ==
Bone evidence indicates that there was a significant growth in the fish trade around 1000 and a move from inshore to deep sea catches. The increased marine exploitation of the Highlands and Islands may have been as a result of the arrival of Scandinavian settlers in this period. Later Aberdeen gained a reputation for the sale of fish, particularly salmon, which was shipped in large Hamburg barrels. The term l'abberdaan was synonymous with cod in Flanders and Cologne in the thirteenth century.

From the reign of David I (1124–53), there are records of burghs (a Germanic word for a fortress), towns that were granted certain legal privileges from the crown. Most of the burghs granted charters in his reign probably already existed as settlements. Charters were copied almost verbatim from those used in England, and they were run by early burgesses that were usually English or Flemish. They were able to impose tolls and fines on traders within a region outside their settlements, which was sometimes, as in the case of Edinburgh, very extensive. Most of the early burghs were on the east coast, and among them were the largest and wealthiest, including Aberdeen, Berwick, Perth and Edinburgh, whose growth was facilitated by trade with the continent. In the south-west, Glasgow, Ayr and Kirkcudbright were aided by the less profitable sea trade with Ireland and to a lesser extent France and Spain. The foundations of around 15 burghs can be traced to the reign of David I and there is evidence of 55 burghs by 1296.

Burghs were centres of basic crafts, including the manufacture of shoes, clothes, dishes, pots, joinery, bread and ale, which would normally be sold to inhabitants and visitors on market days. In the High Middle Ages there was an increasing amount of foreign trade. However, there were relatively few developed manufacturing industries in Scotland for most of this period. As a result, the most important exports were unprocessed raw materials, including wool, hides, salt, fish, animals and coal, while Scotland remained frequently short of wood, iron and, in years of bad harvests, grain, the last of which was brought in large quantities from Ireland and England, particularly in times of dearth. Until the disruption caused by the outbreak of the Wars of Independence in the early fourteenth century, most naval trade was probably coastal and most foreign trade was with England.

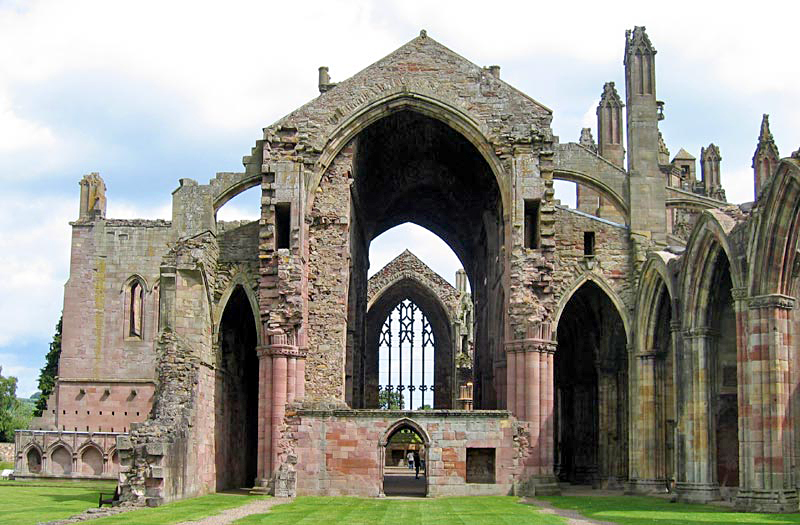
The ruins of Melrose Abbey, which became one of the major exporters of Scottish wool

New monastic orders such as the Cistercians introduced into Scotland in this period became major landholders, particularly in the Borders. They were significant sheep farmers and producers of wool for the markets in Flanders. Some abbeys like Melrose had large amounts of land and very large numbers of sheep, probably at least 12,000 in the late thirteenth century.

Coins began to replace barter goods in this period, with Scottish coins being struck from the reign of David I and mints were established at Berwick, Roxburgh, Edinburgh and Perth, but until the end of the period most exchange was done without the use of metal currency and where it was, English coins probably outnumbered Scottish ones.

== Late Middle Ages ==
In addition to the major royal burghs, the late Middle Ages saw the proliferation of baronial and ecclesiastical burghs, with 51 being created between 1450 and 1516. Most of these were much smaller than their royal counterparts. Excluded from international trade they mainly acted as local markets and centres of craftsmanship. In general, burghs probably carried out far more local trading with their hinterlands than nationally or internationally, relying on them for food and raw materials.

The Wars of Independence closed English markets and raised the levels of piracy and disruption to naval trade on both sides. They may have led to an increase in continental trade. Isolated references indicate that Scottish ships were active in Bergen and Danzig and the earliest records from the 1330s indicate that five-sixths of this trade was in the hands of Scottish merchants. The main continental trading partners of Scottish burghs were German merchants of the Hanseatic League in Flanders. Before 1321 Scottish merchants had established a staple in Bruges through which all wools, woolfells and hides were theoretically channelled. Scots in the town received certain privileges and from 1407 the interests of Scottish merchants were represented by a "conservator of the Scottish privileges". Relationships with Bruges were often difficult. The involvement of Scottish merchants in piracy resulted in embargoes on Scottish traders by the Hanseatic League in 1412–15 and 1419–36. However, trade with Danzig, Stralsund, Hamburg and Bruges continued. The staple was moved to Middelburg in Zeeland several times in the fifteenth century. Although Bruges remained the major trading partner, from the 1460s trade also developed with Veere, Bergen op Zoom and Antwerp. In 1508 James IV moved the Staple to the small port of Veere in the province of Zeeland, where it remained until the late seventeenth century.

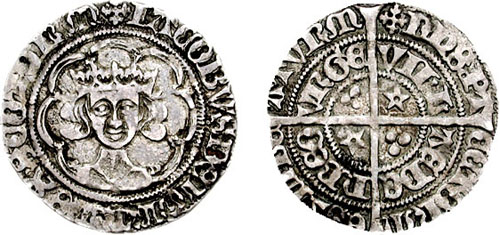
A groat of 1482 showing the head of James III (1460–88), whose reign saw a major debasement of the coinage

Wool and hides were the major exports in the late Middle Ages. From 1327 to 1332, the earliest period for which figures survive, the annual average was 5,700 sacks of wool and 36,100 leather hides. The disruption of the Wars of Independence, which not only limited trade but damaged much of the valuable agricultural land of the Borders and Lowlands, meant that this fell in the period 1341–42 to 1342–43 to 2,450 sacks of wool and 17,900 hides. The trade recovered to reach a peak in the 1370s, with an annual average of 7,360 sacks, but the international recession from the 1380s saw a reduction to an annual average of 3,100 sacks. The introduction of sheep-scab was a serious blow to the wool trade from the early fifteenth century. Despite a levelling off, there was another drop in exports as the markets collapsed in the early-sixteenth century Low Countries. Unlike in England, this did not prompt the Scots to turn to large scale cloth production and only poor quality rough cloths seem to have been significant. Exports of hides and particularly salmon, where the Scots held a decisive advantage in quality over their rivals, appear to have held up much better than wool, despite the general economic downturn in Europe in the aftermath of the Black Death. Exports of hides averaged 56,400 a year from 1380 to 1384, but fell to an average of 48,000 over the next five years and to 34,200 by the end of the century.

With the Wars of Independence and changes of Irish land from arable to pastoral farming, new sources of grain were needed. It began to be imported in large quantities, particularly from the Baltic ports, through Berwick and Ayr. There was a growing desire among the court, lords, upper clergy and wealthier merchants for luxury goods, that largely had to be imported, including fine cloth from Flanders and Italy, wine, pottery, armour and military equipment. This led to a chronic shortage of bullion. This, and perennial problems in royal finance, led to several debasements of the coinage, with the amount of silver in a penny being cut to almost a fifth between the late fourteenth century and the late fifteenth century. The heavily debased "black money", introduced in 1480, had to be withdrawn two years later and may have helped fuel a financial and political crisis.
