= William Davidson of Curriehill =

Sir William Davidson
- Baronet of Curriehill
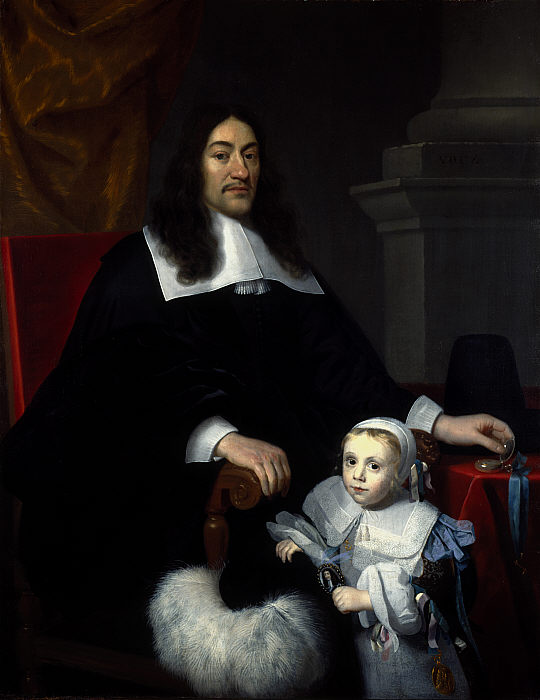
- Sir William Davidson of Curriehill and his son Charles; portrait by Abraham van den Tempel (1664)
- Known for: Member of Privy Council, involvement in Stuart Restoration, mining, and trade in Norway
- Years active: 1661–c.1689
- Born: 1614/5; Dundee, Scotland
- Died: c. 1689; Edinburgh, Scotland
- Spouses: Geertruid Schuring; Geertruid van Dueren; Elisabeth Klencke
- Occupation: Tradesman, Diplomat, Spy

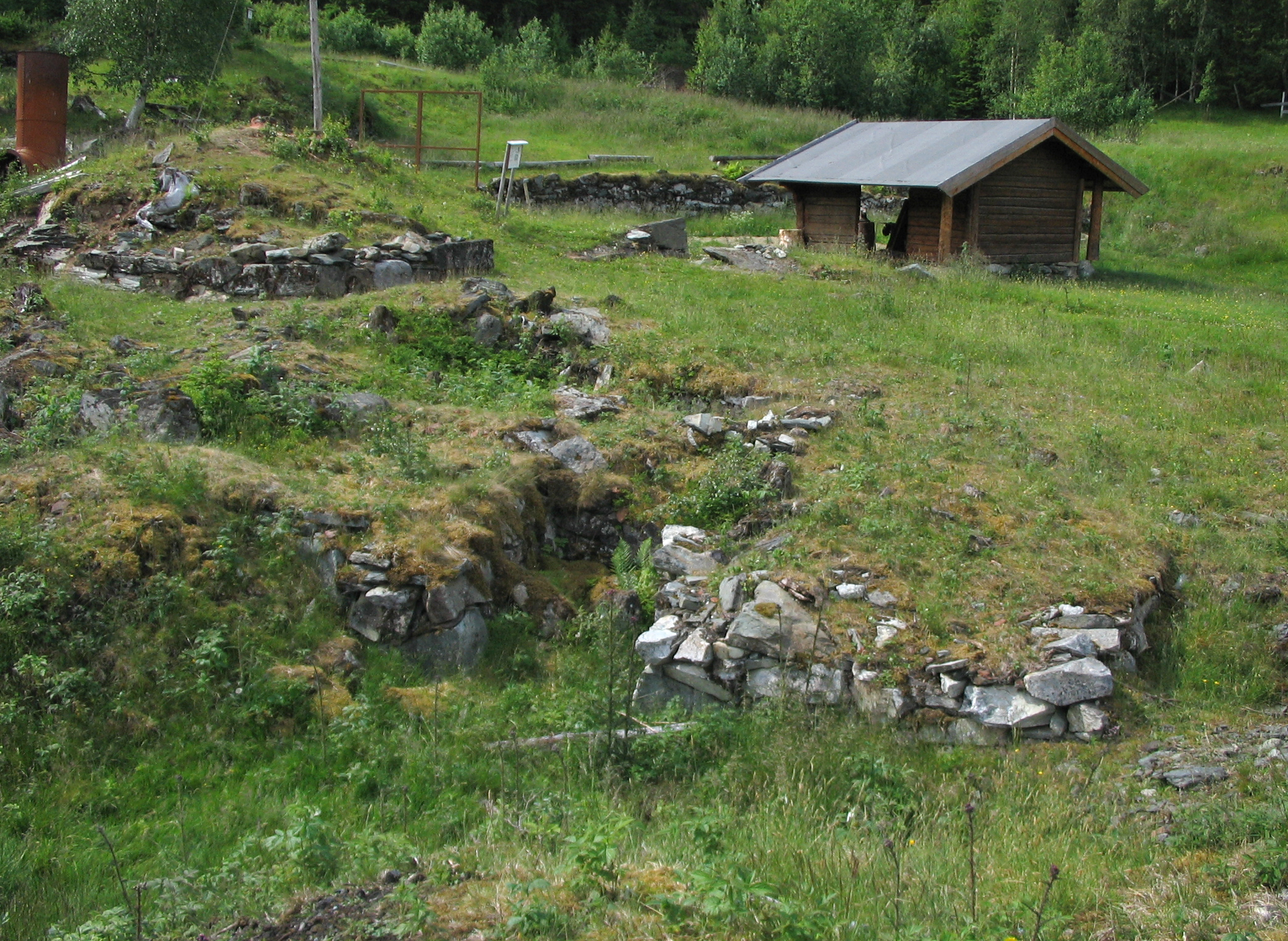
The remains of Mostadmarka ironwork in Malvik

Sir William Davidson, 1st Baronet of Curriehill, (Dundee, 1614/5 – Edinburgh, c. 1689) was a Scottish tradesman in Amsterdam, an agent and a spy for the King and a member of his Privy Council.

== Life ==
Nothing is known about his youth and ancestors, but he settled in Holland after 1640 and traded in the Baltic region. In 1645 he married Geertruid Schuring and stated that he was 29. In 1648 he appointed Anthony van Leeuwenhoek as an assistant. Van Leeuwenhoek stayed six years in his service. Davidson lived and worked in the Warmoesstraat, close to the Oude Kerk.

In 1652 his wife died. At that time he was living on Nieuwe Waalseiland, close to the harbour, and selling wine in Stockholm. He remarried Geertruid van Dueren, who died in 1658.

During the English Civil War, he sided with the Stuarts. In May 1660 he went to see Charles II in The Hague on his way to England. In July 1660 Mary Stuart stayed in his house on Herengracht, to settle an agreement with the Amsterdam burgomasters on the education of her grandson William III of Orange, only ten years old. In February he married Elisabeth Klencke, a sister of Johannes Klencke, who presented the Klencke Atlas to the King. It was presented by a consortium of Dutch sugar merchants, to King Charles II of England in 1660 to mark the occasion of his Restoration to the throne. The consortium likely hoped to gain favourable trade agreements with Britain for slave trade and their sugar plantations.

In 1662 he was appointed as the King's agent in Amsterdam; he had already been knighted as a baronet by Charles II and in 1661 as the conservator of the staple in Veere. In 1664, during the Second Dutch War he moved to Hamburg. In 1666 he was involved in a salt company in Denmark, together with Cort Adeler.

From 1664 he mined for iron at Mostadmark (in the present-day Malvik Municipality), east of Trondheim with permission for 20 years from Frederik III of Denmark and Hannibal Sehested (governor) of Norway. Davidson started to invest heavily in ironworks from 1656, placed Alexander Wishart from Edinburgh there as the boss and director of the production in 1658. He was involved in a sawing mill and the production of tar.

In 1666 he sold his ironworks to his brother-in-law nl:Coenraad van Klenck, as well as his portion of the salt company. In 1667 he lived in Edinburgh. Davidson served as an intermediary between Charles II and Johan de Witt.

In 1668 he tried to move the staple from Veere, a Dutch town with a large Scottish population, to Dordrecht. In 1668 he became Lord of Curriehill. In 1672 he was involved in the tobacco trade on Virginia.

On 14 October 1670 he was allowed to start mining for copper near Klæbu, south of Trondheim, according to a letter from King Christian IV of Denmark. He started the Ulrichsdal Mining Company, and build a melting-cabin at Hyttefossen in Klæbu. He went broke and in 1675 he was gone from Trondheim. Davidson spent the remaining of his life in settling legal battles against a host of complaints from the Trondheim civic and mercantile society.

Sometime after 1678, when he made his will in Amsterdam, he settled in Scotland. Four children - Bernard (1648-), Elisabeth (1651-), Catharina Geertrui (1663-), Agnes (1666-) - inherited, with Catharina getting his Indonesian silver and the portraits of his parents-in-law. Not much is known about his cabinet of curiosities and lacquerware cupboard and boxes.

Baronetage of Nova Scotia
New creation	Baronet (of Curriehill); 1661–c.1689	Extinct
