= Johannes Klencke =

Dutch philosopher (c. 1620–1672)

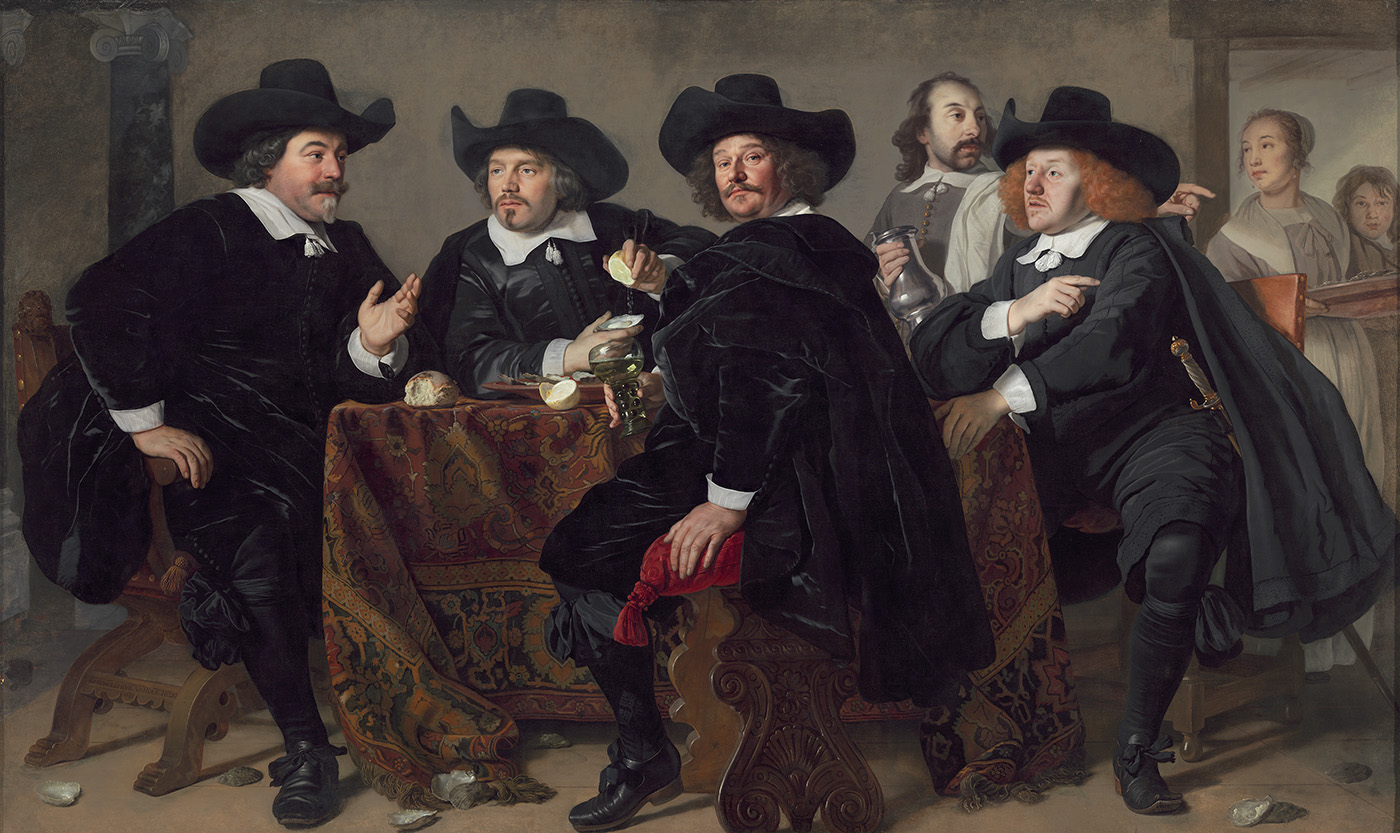
Reynst (far right), with (from left) his fellow aldermen and contemporaries Cornelis Jan Witsen, Roelof Bicker, and Simon van Hoorn by Bartholomeus van der Helst (1655).

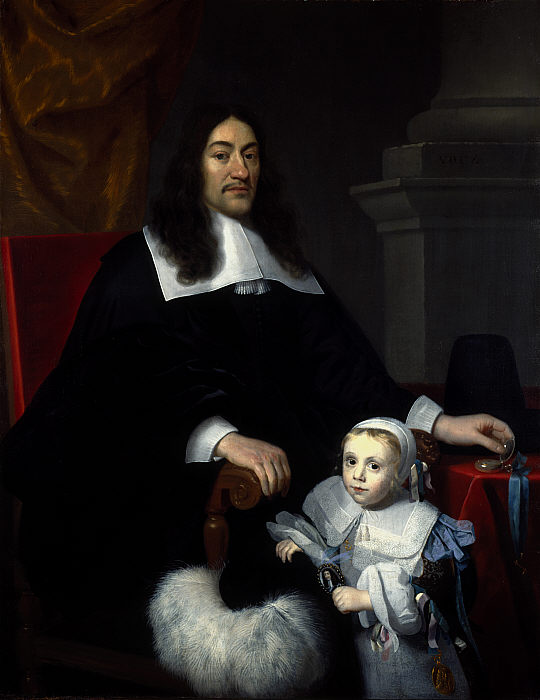
Brother-in-law of Johannes Klencke Sir William Davidson of Curriehill, who appointed in 1648 Anthonie van Leeuwenhoek as his assistant; by Abraham van den Tempel (1664)

Johannes Klencke, van Klenck or Klenckius (bapt. 5 March 1620, in Amsterdam – early 1672, in Batavia, Dutch East Indies) was a Dutch teacher in philosophy at the Athenaeum Illustre in Amsterdam.

== Life ==
Johannes Klenck was the eldest son of a trader in Russian caviar and studied theology in Leiden. On 24 May 1644 he accepted a post on issues concerning morality. There he introduced debating with the students. In 1648 he was appointed professor of philosophy at the illustrious school of Amsterdam. He taught physics, metaphysics, logic, ethics and politics.

In May 1660, acting on behalf of a consortium of Dutch sugar merchants with plantations in the Caribbean, he offered the Klencke Atlas to the King, hoping to gain favourable trade agreements with Britain.

In July 1660, Louis of Nassau arrived in London; his countrymen Simon van Hoorn, curator of the Athenaeum, Michiel van Gogh and the Roman Catholic Joachim Ripperda arrived in November to present to Charles II the Dutch Gift, consisting of furniture, a yacht, 24 paintings, and twelve statues to celebrate the Restoration in 1661? The three envoys were assisted by 24 servants and a few clerks when they left Den Briel on 29 October 1660. Klencke, an expert on Grotius, may have accompanied them, to discuss 'unrestricted trade', and the Act of Navigation.

He was made a knight on 19 September 1660. In 1669 he left Amsterdam for Paris and London. According to Isaac Vossius, Klencke was silly and insane. In 1672 he died suddenly at Batavia.

== Relatives ==
Ernst van Klenck, a merchant trading with Russia, married in 1660 a daughter of Pieter de Carpentier. In 1661 his brother Herman van Klenck was appointed as a Governor of Formosa (now called Taiwan), but never set a foot on the island when he noticed Fort Zeelandia was occupied by the Chinese soldier Koxinga. Coenraad van Klenck, a trader on Russia and member of the Amsterdam vroedschap, was an envoy to Russia in 1675. Their brother-in-law William Davidson of Curriehill invited Mary Stuart into his house in July 1660 and seems to have been a spy for Charles II. In 1660 he was rewarded with an appointment as conservator of the Staple in Veere.
