= Mrs Pawling =

British artist

- Known for: Pastel Portraits

Mrs. Pawling was a late 17th-century pastel portrait artist, who was active from c. 1690 to c. 1700.

== Biography ==
Mrs. Pawling is credited with a small number of crayon, pastel portraits at the end of the 17th century. Her work has been compared to that of Henrietta Johnston. Three examples of Mrs. Pawling's work can be found at Belton House; a portrait of Sir Pury Cust (1655–1698/9), a portrait of Lady Alice Savile Cust (1666/7–1712), and a portrait of Savile Cockayne Cust (1698–1772) as a child. Four pastel-on-paper portraits of the Harley family can be found at Welbeck Abbey.

It is believed that Mrs. Pawling was the wife of Isaac Paling, who was in England from 1682 until 1703.
