= Kennedy baronets of Clowburn (1698) =

Escutcheon of the Kennedy baronets of Clowburn

The Kennedy baronetcy, of Clowburn, parish of Pettinain in the County of Lanark, was created in the Baronetage of Nova Scotia on 8 June 1698 for Andrew Kennedy who had come into the Clowburn estate by marriage into the Weir family. He had been imprisoned in 1683 after the Battle of Bothwell Bridge, for assisting fugitives. In 1690, he was appointed Conservator of the Scottish Staple.

According to Cokayne, the title became either extinct or dormant on the death of the 2nd Baronet in 1729. It is extinct, in terms of the Official Roll.

== Kennedy baronets, of Clowburn (1698) ==
- Sir Andrew Kennedy, 1st Baronet (died 1717)
- Sir John Vere Kennedy, 2nd Baronet (died 1729)
