= Jacob Adriaensz Backer =

Dutch painter (1608–1651)

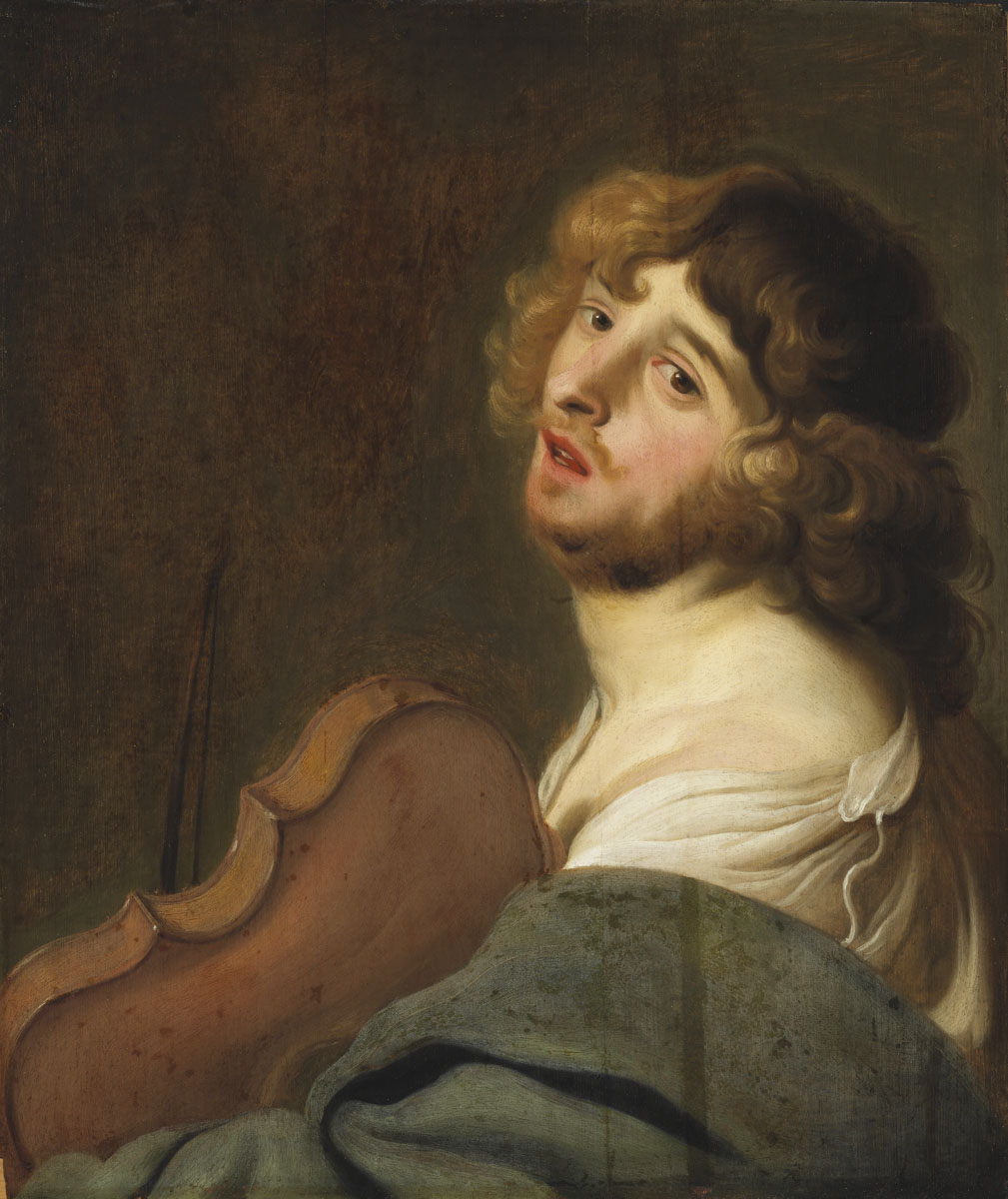
The Hearing by Jacob Backer (1635), oil painting, Magyar Szépmüvészeti Múzeum, Budapest

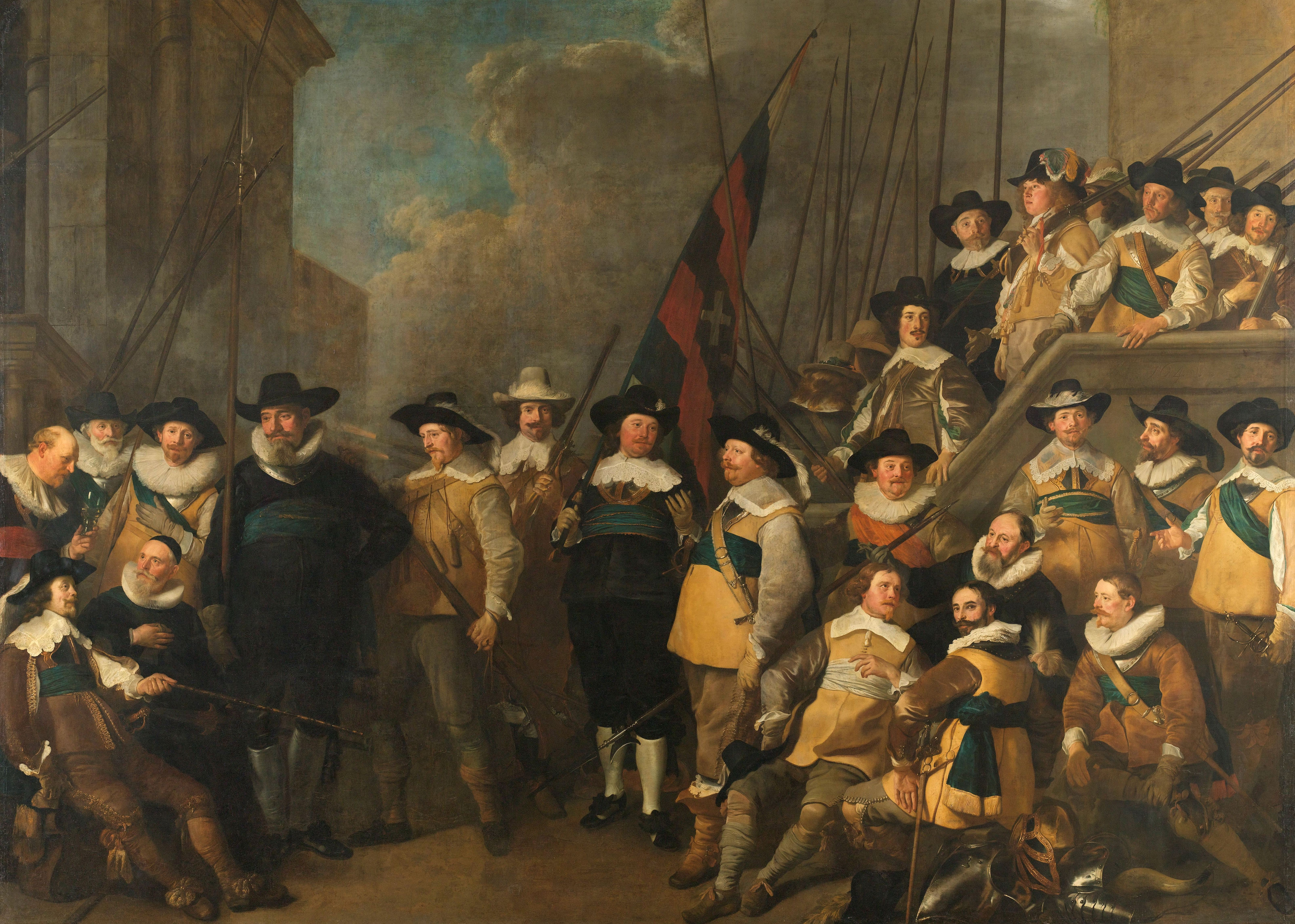
Company of Cornelis de Graeff and luitenant Hendrick Lauwrensz by Jacob Backer (1642)

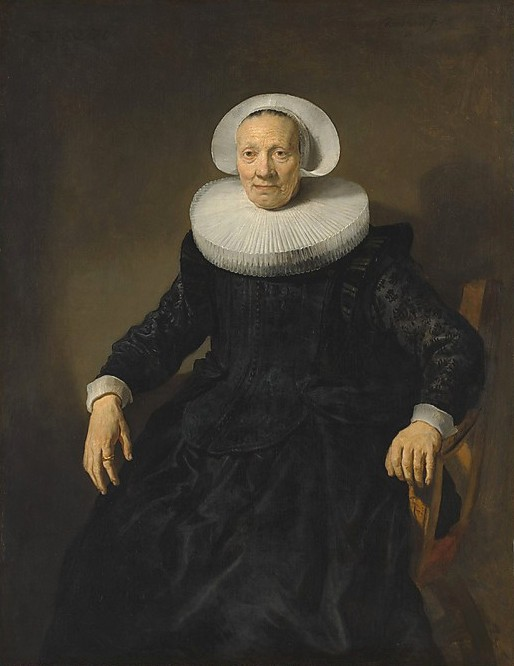
Perhaps this portrait of a woman in an armchair by Backer seemed more attractive to the sitter mentioned by Sandrart than the portraits by Frans Hals of her Haarlem contemporaries, the Voogt sisters, and that is why she travelled to Amsterdam for her portrait to be done.

Jacob Adriaensz Backer (1608 – 27 August 1651) was a Dutch Golden Age painter. He produced about 140 paintings in twenty years, including portraits, religious subjects, and mythological paintings. In his style, he was influenced by Wybrand de Geest, Rubens and Abraham Bloemaert. He is also noted for his drawings of male and female nudes.

== Biography ==
Backer was born in Harlingen, Netherlands, but his father moved to Amsterdam in 1611, after his wife had died. The family lived on Nieuwendijk near the harbour. Between 1627 and 1633 he and Govert Flinck, both Mennonites, were pupils of Lambert Jacobsz in Leeuwarden, a mennonite teacher, father of Abraham Lambertsz van den Tempel, painter of religious work, and after moving to Amsterdam, a neighbor. In 1633 Backer returned to Amsterdam, and probably worked for Hendrick Uylenburgh. Backer never married, never bought a house, and might have lived with his brother or nephew Adriaen Backer, who also became a portrait painter. He died in Amsterdam, in his early forties.

== Work ==
His extreme quickness in painting portraits has been particularly noticed, and Joachim von Sandrart wrote in his Teutsche Academie that a woman came from Haarlem and went home the same day, in which short period of time her portrait, cuffs, fur, collar, together with the rest of her dress and both hands, was handsomely completed in a life-sized half-length. This remark refers both to the success of the wet-on-wet technique practised in the Netherlands at that time, as well as the fact that the trekschuit, which was a new invention in 1632, allowed regular comfortable transport between Haarlem and Amsterdam and made such trips to portrait painters possible.

Besides being an important portrait painter—some 70 portraits can be attributed to him with certainty—Backer was an excellent painter of religious and mythological paintings. He was especially interested in pastoral subjects, themes from contemporary history, like Granida and Daifilo, and the huge Crowning of Mirtillo from 1641 in the Brukenthal National Museum in Sibiu (250 x 250 cm.). The painting with the schutterij, Company of Cornelis de Graeff, for years on the same wall as Rembrandt's Night Watch, is in the Rijksmuseum. Backer, who joined Rembrandt's studio between 1632 and 1634, was one of the most independent of his pupils although absorbed the spirit of Rembrand's style which is reflected in his Portrait of a Woman (Saskia van Uylenburgh?) in the National Museum in Warsaw (c. 1633). The artist excelled in painting hands and feet. He never painted a town or landscape. He was a leading artist in Amsterdam until his premature death in 1651. He was buried in the Noorderkerk.

A major exhibition of Jacob Backer's work was displayed at the Rembrandthuis from 29 November 2008 to 22 February 2009.

== Selected works ==
- Portrait of a Woman (Saskia van Uylenburgh?), c. 1633, National Museum, Warsaw
- Granida and Daifilo, c. 1635, Hermitage Museum, St. Petersburg
- Portrait of a Young Woman, c. 1638, Los Angeles County Museum of Art, Los Angeles
- Courtesan, 1640, National Museum of Ancient Art, Lisbon
- Crowning of Mirtillo, 1641, Brukenthal National Museum, Sibiu, Romania
- Company of Cornelis de Graeff, 1642, Rijksmuseum, Amsterdam
- Diana With Her Nymphs, 1649, Hermitage Museum, St. Petersburg
- Portrait of A Lady, Nelson-Atkins Art Museum, Kansas City, Missouri
- The Angel Appearing to the Centurion Cornelius, c. 1630, Indiana University Art Museum, Bloomington, Indiana
- Portrait of Young Women, Regional gallery of Liberec, Czech Republic

== Sources ==
- Peter van den Brink et al. (2008) Jacob Backer (1608/9-1651).
- Walter Liedtke (2007) Dutch paintings in the Metropolitan Museum of Art.
