= Isaac Paling =

Dutch painter

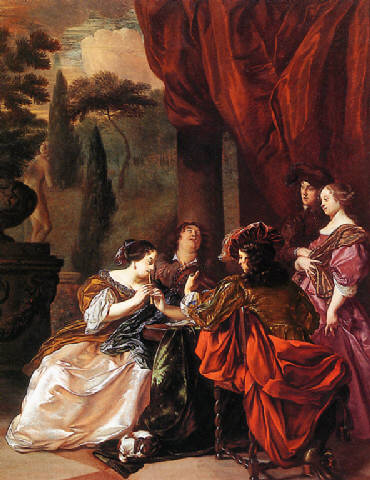
Musical concert

Isaac Paling (c.1640 – 1728) was a Dutch Golden Age painter.

== Biography ==
Paling was born in Leiden. According to Houbraken he was a pupil of Abraham van den Tempel and a colleague of Jacob Torenvliet in Leiden.

According to the RKD he became a member of the Confrerie Pictura in the Hague from 1681–1682 and travelled on 1682 to London where he stayed until 1702. He settled in the Hague in 1702, and remained there until his death.

It is believed that Paling was married to an artist, only referred to as Mrs Pawling, who was a late 17th-century pastel portraitist.
