= Lambert Jacobsz =

Dutch Golden Age painter and preacher

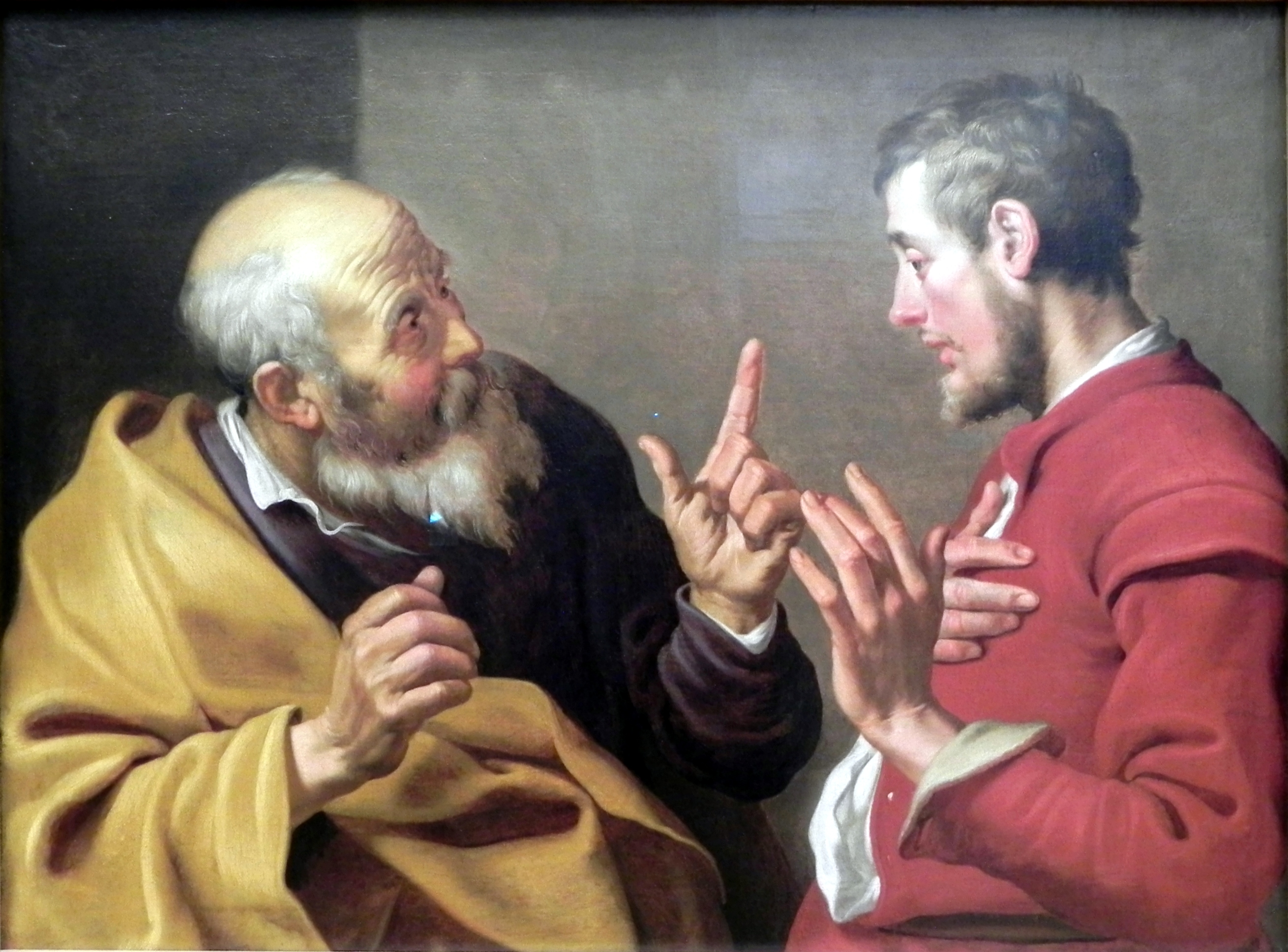
Prophet Elisa and servant Gehasi by Lambert Jacobsz, Lower Saxony State Museum, 1629

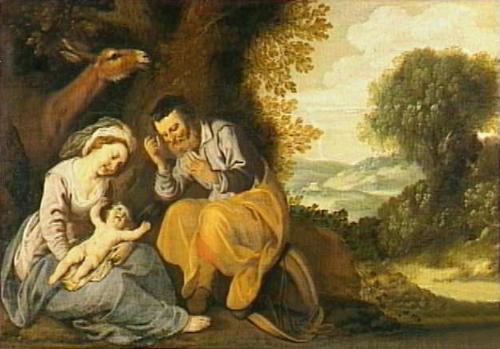
Rest on the flight into Egypt by Lambert Jacobsz, Fries Museum, Leeuwarden, 1624

Lambert Jacobsz, also Lambert Jacobsz. or Lambert Jacobszoon (1598 – 27 June 1636), was a Dutch Golden Age painter and preacher.

Jacobsz was born in Amsterdam. He was the father of Abraham Lambertsz van den Tempel, and primarily painted figures. He was also active in his local Mennonite community. According to the RKD, his apprentices were Govert Flinck, Jacob Adriaensz Backer, Heere Innes, and his son. He died at Leeuwarden in 1636 during an outbreak of plague there. Much of his work is still located in the buildings for which it was painted in Leeuwarden. Some of his works are displayed at the National Gallery of Victoria and a series of four saints portraits at the musée des beaux-arts de Rouen.
