= Abraham Lambertsz van den Tempel =

Dutch painter (c. 1622 – 1672)

Abraham van den Tempel
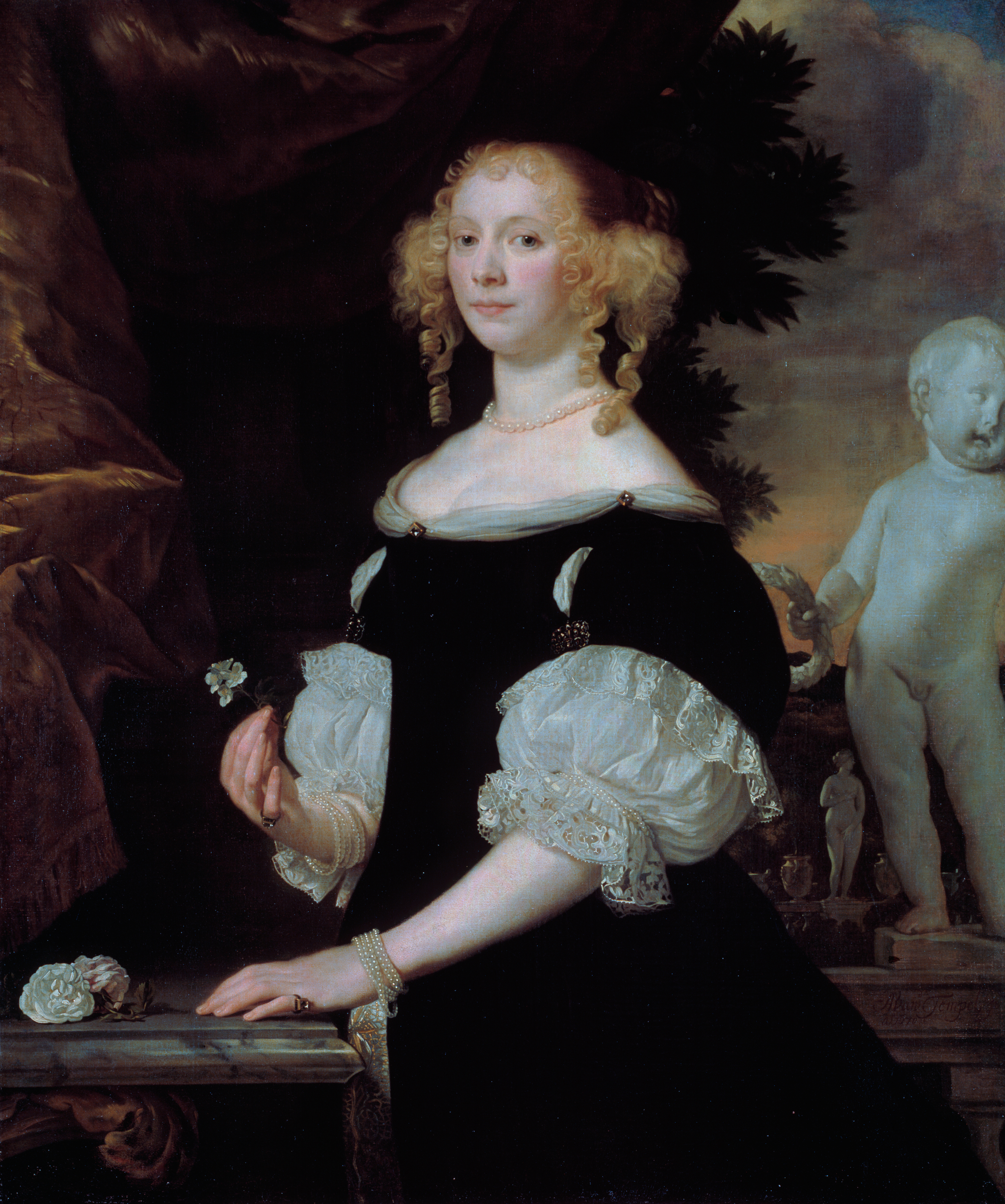
- Portrait of a woman Abraham Lambertz van den Tempel, 1668
- Born: Abraham Lambertsz; 1622; Leeuwarden
- Died: 1672 (aged 49–50); Amsterdam
- Known for: Painting
- Movement: Baroque

Abraham van den Tempel (c. 1622 – 8 October 1672) was a Dutch Golden Age painter.

== Biography ==
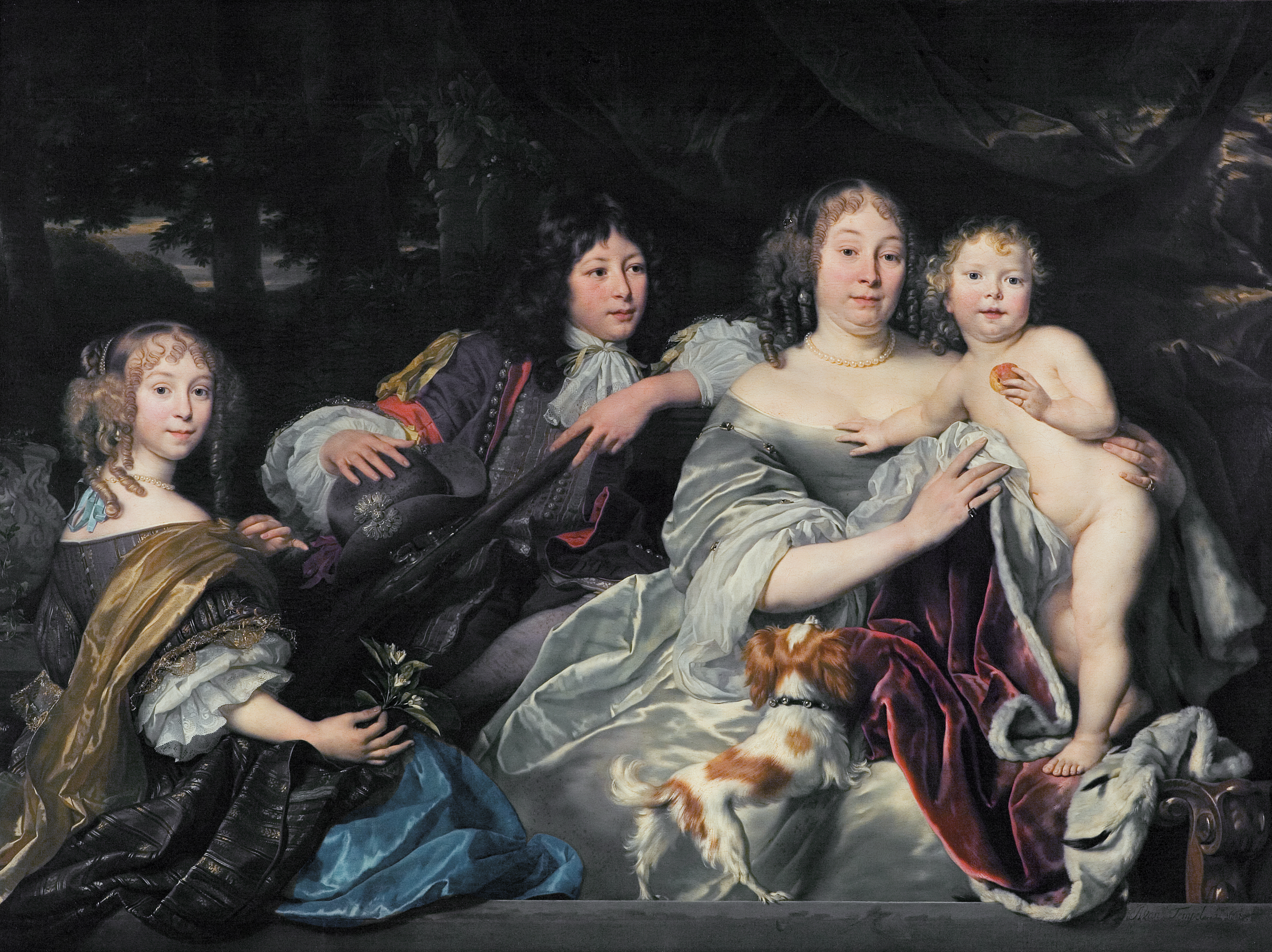
Princess Albertina of Orange with children

He probably learned painting from his father, also a painter, but who died when he was still quite young, in 1636. That is the same year that he moved to Amsterdam, where he stayed until 1647, whereupon he moved to Leiden. According to Houbraken he was the son of a Mennonite preacher in Leeuwarden who was a respected art teacher. His father was Lambert Jacobsz (or Jacobszoon), who had taught Govert Flinck and Jacob Adriaensz Backer in their youth, both of whom were artists from Mennonite families. Abraham took the name Tempel because when he studied in Leiden, he lived in a house there with a relief of a Tempel in the keystone. He became a pupil of Jacob Backer, and studied mathematics at Leiden University. He met with great success with the Leiden city council, earning several generous commissions, including a series of three large allegorical paintings on the cloth industry of Leiden for the Cloth Hall which still hang in their original place today in the Stedelijk Museum De Lakenhal.

He became master of the Guild of St. Luke in 1657 and in 1659 he was chartermaster. In 1660 he returned to Amsterdam. His pupils were Frans van Mieris the Elder, Carel de Moor, Michiel van Musscher, Ary de Vois, and Isaac Paling.

== Early life and training ==
Abraham van den Tempel was born in Leeuwarden, Netherlands, around 1622. He likely received his early artistic training from his father, Lambert Jacobsz, a respected art teacher and Mennonite preacher. Jacobsz had previously instructed notable artists like Govert Flinck and Jacob Adriaensz Backer.

== Gallery ==
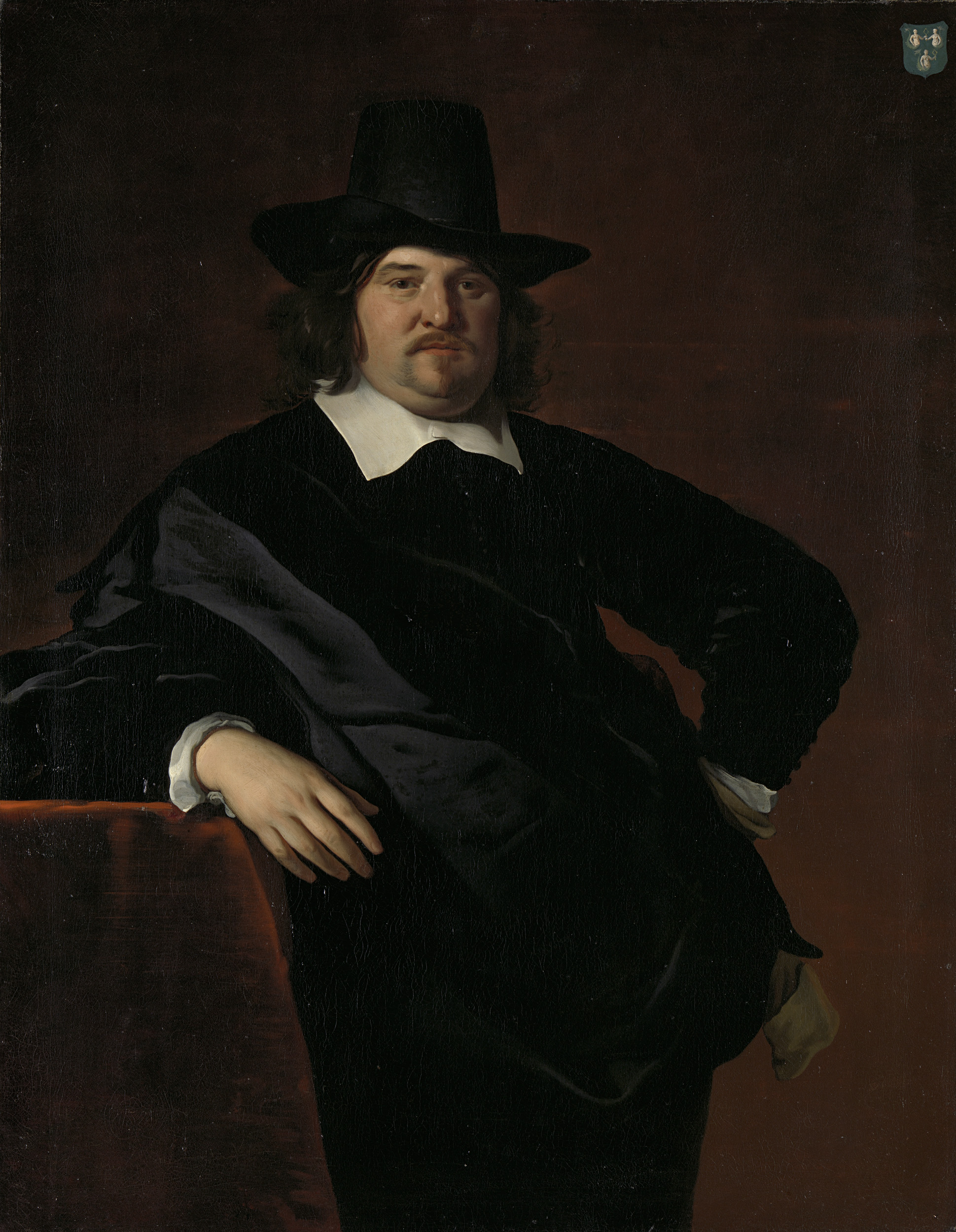
Portrait of Abraham de Visscher (1605-1667)

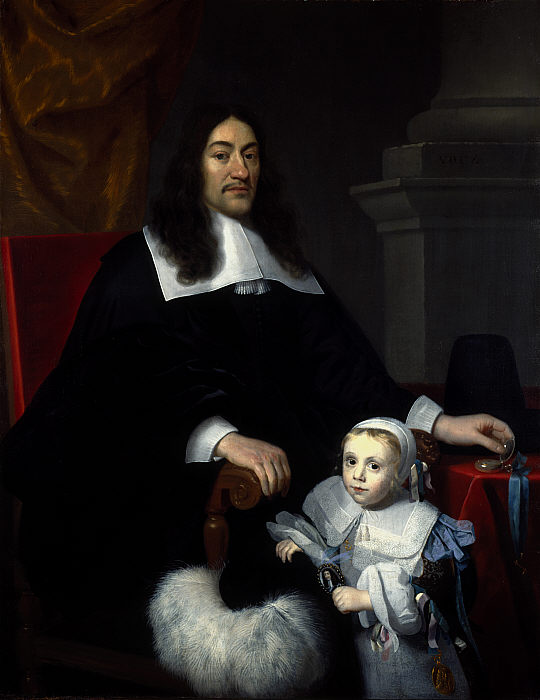
Sir William Davidson of Curriehill, 1615/16 - 1689. Conservator of the Staple at Veere (with his son Charles), Dated about 1664

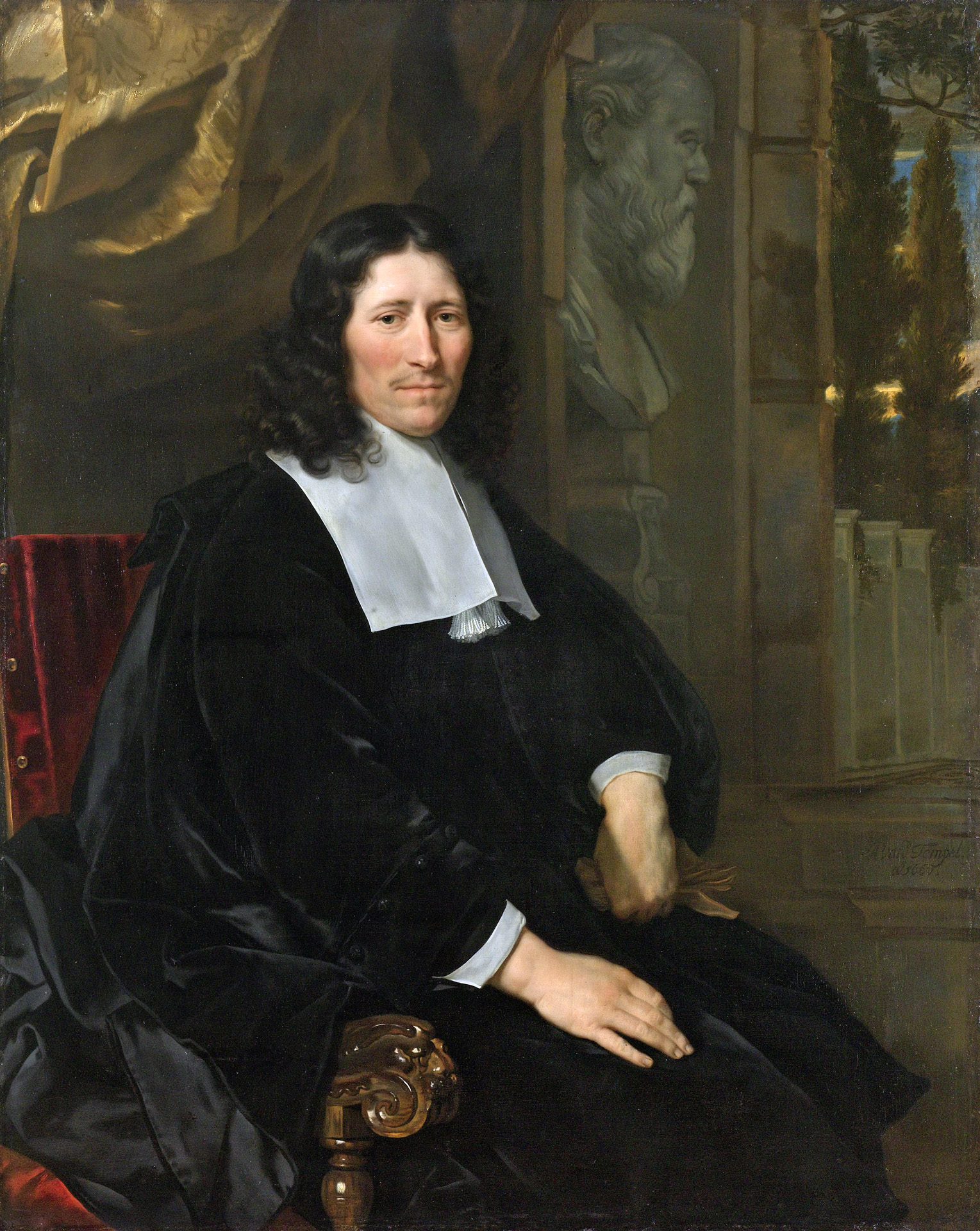
van den Tempel of Pieter de la Court (1618-1685), cloth merchant and writer of political and economic works.

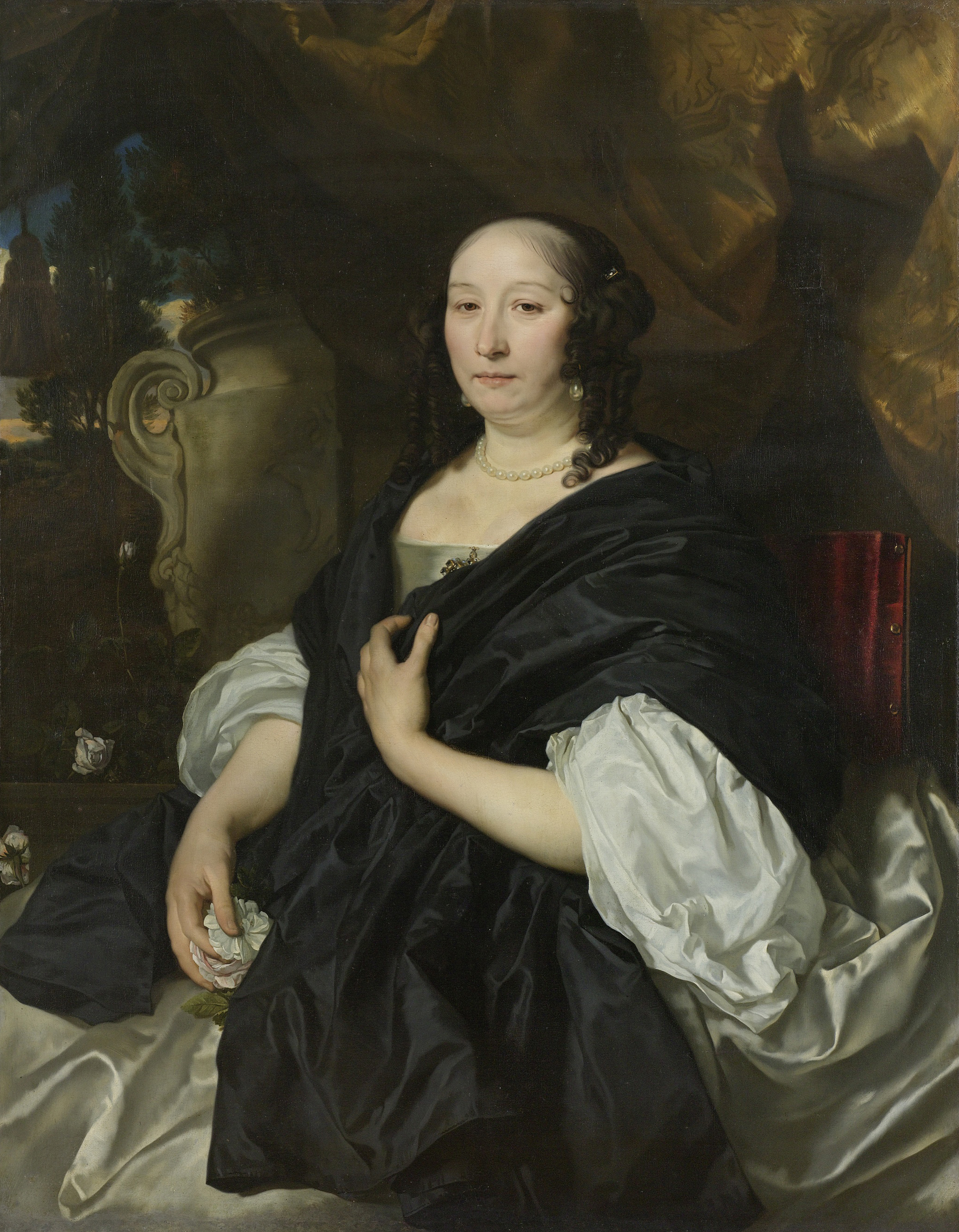
Portrait of Catharina van der Voort (1622–74)
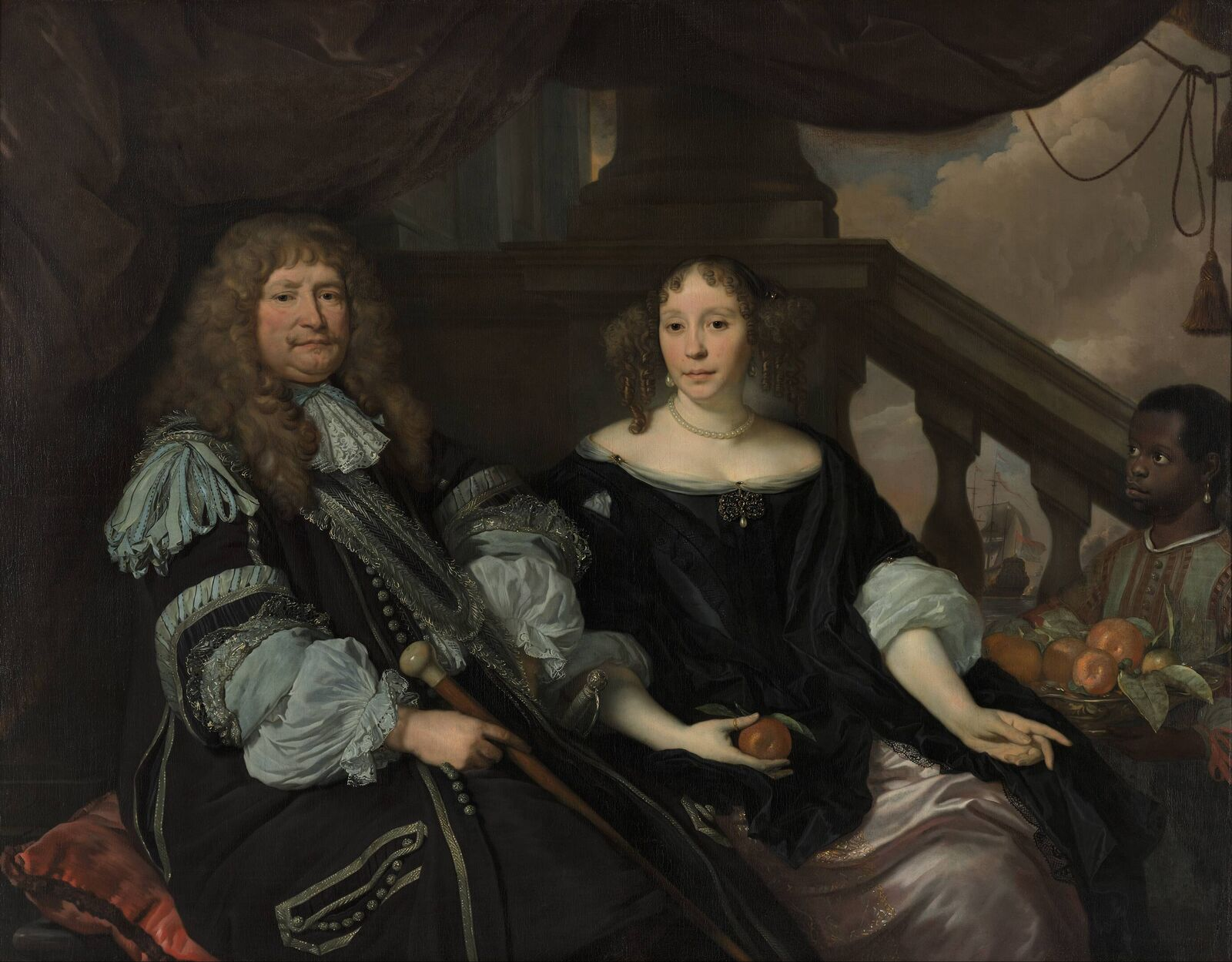
Portrait of Jan van Amstel (1618-1669) and Anna Boxhoorn (1642-1726).

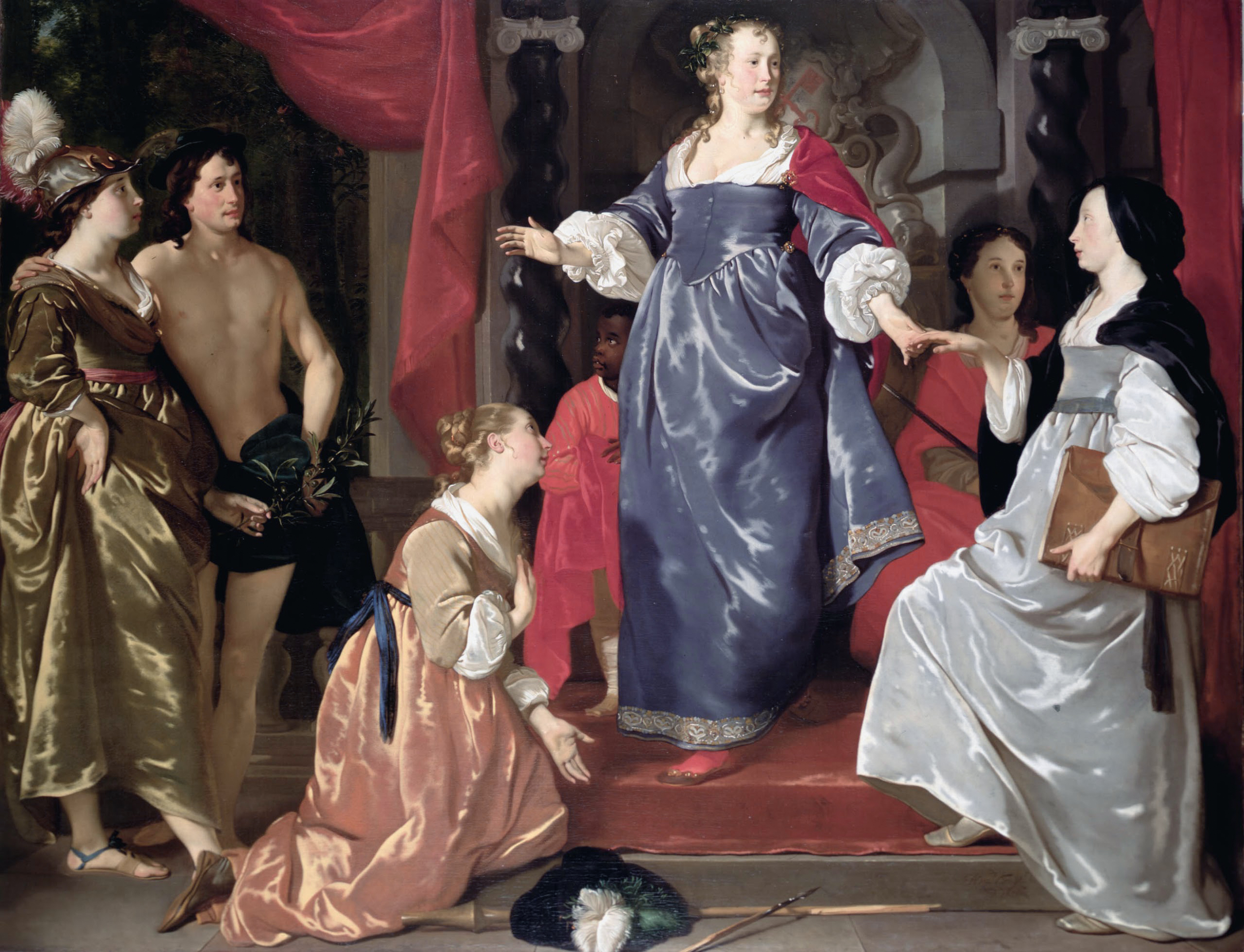
Leiden receives the broadcloth

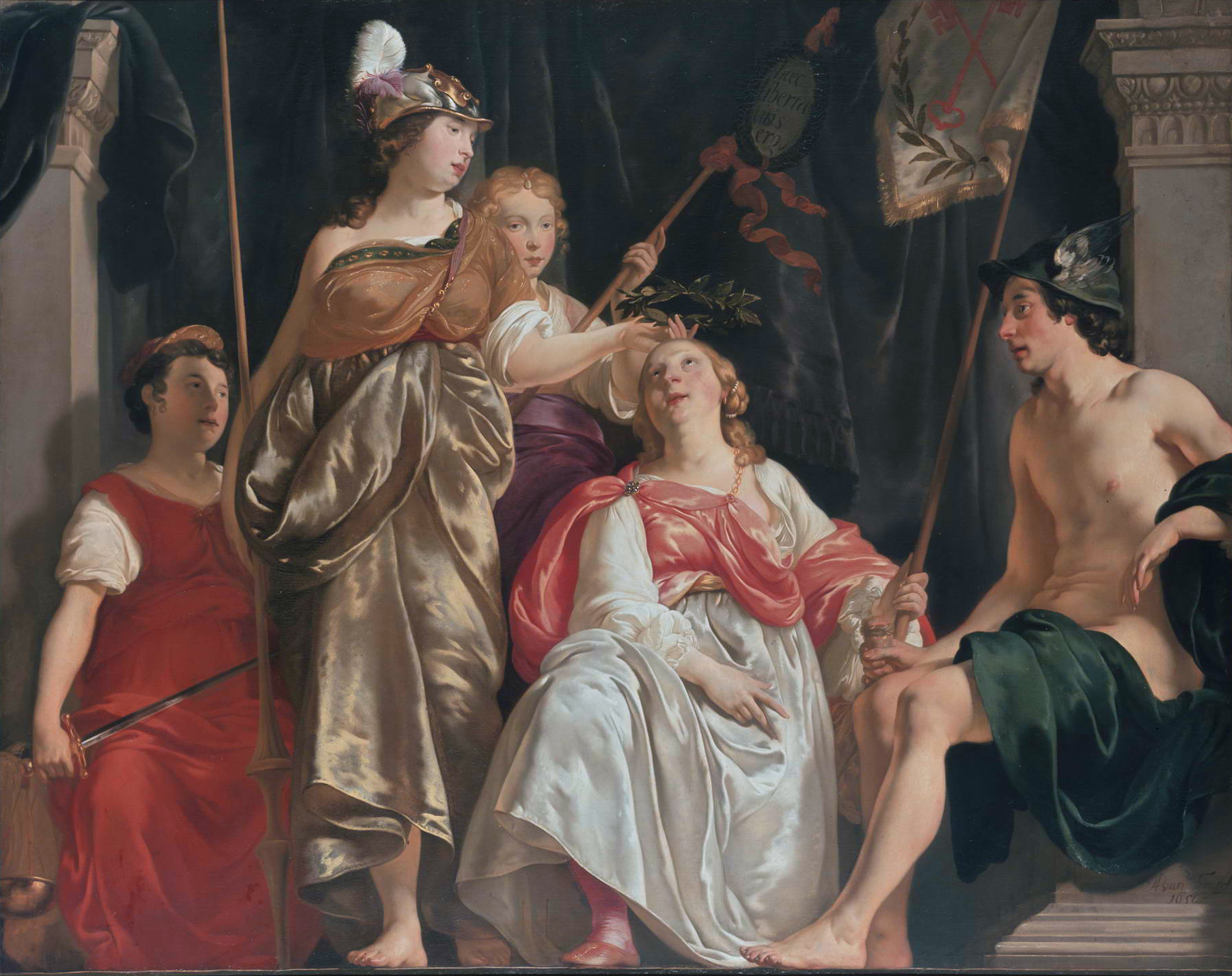
The Maid of Leiden

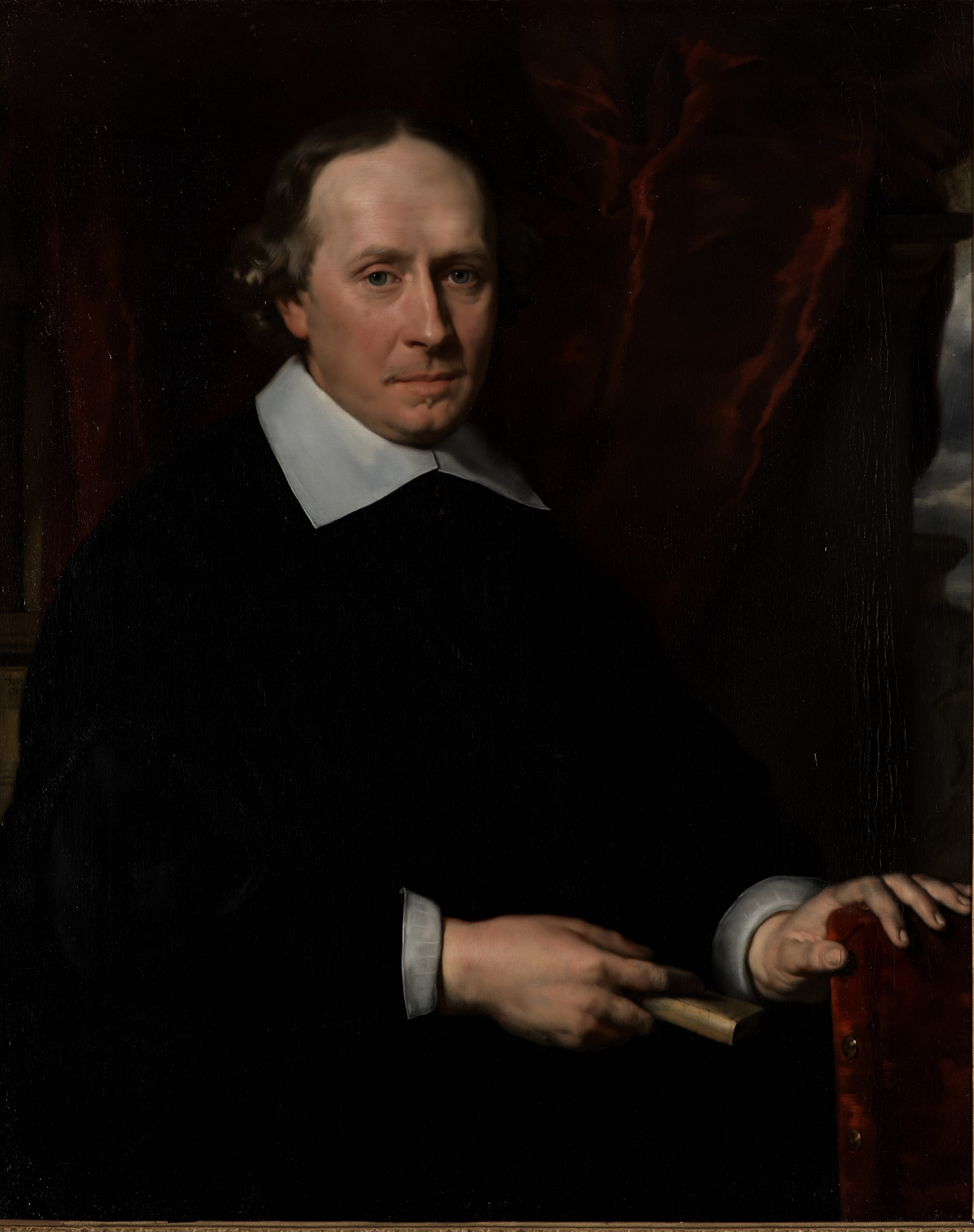
Portrait of Joannes Antonides Van Der Linden

Two Dogs in a Park by Abraham van den Tempel, 1672, Musée de la Chartreuse, Douai
