= Scottish Staple =

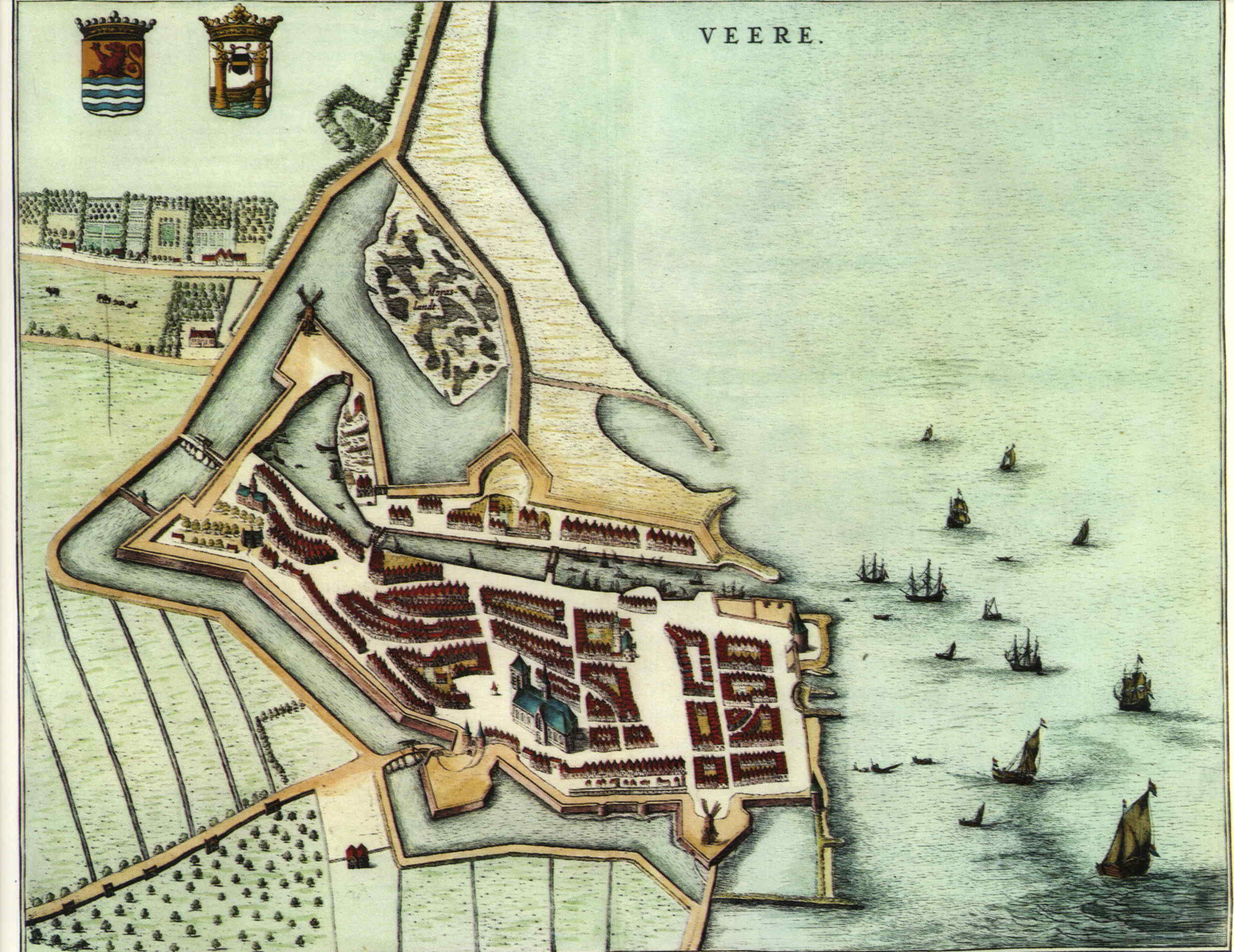
Map of Veere, known in Scotland as Campvere, the staple port for Scotland between 1541 and 1799 Joan Blaeu, 1652

The Scottish Staple was a medieval and early modern trading system that required Scottish merchants to conduct foreign trade, particularly in goods like wool and hides, through designated staple ports—most notably in the Low Countries—to regulate commerce and secure royal revenues. There were some similarities with the Staple that ran in England.

== History ==
In the 15th century, Bruges was the Scottish staple port. The arrangement was made following the marriage of Wolfert VI of Borselen and Mary Stewart, Countess of Buchan in 1444.

As the harbour at Bruges silted up, the focus of Scots trade moved north to the Dutch ports of Middelburg and Veere, with Veere gaining staple status in 1541, when the merchant Andrew Mowbray (III) travelled to Middelburg as commissioner for the city of Edinburgh to negotiate a trade agreement with Maximilian II of Burgundy.

There is some evidence of Dordrecht being used in 1670.

== Conservator of Privileges ==
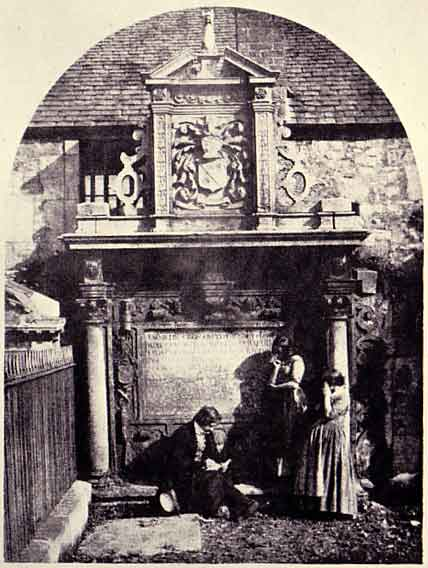
Robert Denniston's Greyfriars Kirkyard monument in 1848

At the Staple towns, Scottish interests were served by an officer called the Conservator of Privileges, or Conservator of the Scottish Staple. The Conservator held a judicial court reckoned as an inferior jurisdiction under the authority of the Parliament of Scotland. A Conservator of Privileges was established at Bruges on 12 September 1408 by Robert Stewart, Duke of Albany, Regent of Scotland.

The Conservators include Stevin Anguys and Anselm Adornes (died 1483) in Bruges; Andrew Halyburton (died 1507); George Gordon, George Hacket (died 1589) who bought books for James VI in 1578, and carried letters from Philip Sidney to the Master of Gray; Robert Denniston (appointed 1589); Thomas Cunningham senior, Deputy-Conservator (died 1623); Patrick Drummond; Thomas Cunningham; Johannes Klencke; William Davidson of Curriehill; James Kennedy; Andrew Kennedy of Clowburn, who worked at Rotterdam, and was said to have first imported tea to Scotland; and John Hume.

In May 1581, William Broun and other merchants in Edinburgh complained that the Conservator in Flanders made them sell their exported goods at Veere rather than allow them to transport their goods for sale in other markets in Flanders, as was usual in some circumstances. The burgh council wrote to the Conservator upholding Broun's requests.

=== Robert Denniston ===
Robert Denniston or Danielstoun of Mountjoy (died 1625) was appointed as Conservator of Privileges in 1589, preferred by James VI for the role instead of George Kincaid. The burgh towns of Scotland resisted his appointment at first, until Denniston negotiated with their commisioners. His submission addressed the issue raised in 1581 by William Broun, allowing trade in other towns than Veere. Denniston later served as a Privy Councillor. In 1592, he corresponded with Lord Menmuir, the master of metals in Scotland, about the prospector Eustachius Roche. Denniston offered to assist Menmuir's business interests.

Denniston's deputy was Gilbert Baty. On 13 August 1594, Denniston was at Leith with Adrian Damman to welcome the Dutch ambassadors Walraven III van Brederode and Jacob Valcke. They came to Scotland for the baptism of Prince Henry. By February 1595, King James accredited Denniston as his ambassador to the States General.

Denniston was related to two goldsmiths in Edinburgh, James and Robert Denniston. He married Helen Myreton (died 1608), a daughter of the laird of Cambo near Kingsbarns. His brother-in-law John Myreton studied abroad with a classmate Thomas Morison, and returned to Scotland as a Jesuit in March 1595 carrying a jewel depicting the crucifixion. Denniston got in trouble in September 1596 after allowing the exiled Catholic Francis Hay, 9th Earl of Erroll to escape from his custody. Denniston was summoned by the Privy Council in November 1596 and suspended from his duties as Conservator for a time. After a period of sickness, Denniston came to Edinburgh and was forgiven and reinstated as Conservator by James VI at Holyrood Palace on 31 January 1597.

Denniston's second wife was Catherine Gibson, the widow of Anne of Denmark's physician Martin Schöner. Denniston died on 15 June 1625 and was buried at Greyfriars Kirkyard in Edinburgh, where there is a monument. The Latin inscription refers obliquely to his dealings with exiled Catholics for King James. Denniston left 1,200 merks to complete the monument. His will mentions a gilt cup with his enamelled coat of arms, he left his cloak and best suit of clothes to his stepson James Schöner, and £100 to Margaret Schöner for her bridal gown.
