= Sleeping Silenus =

Coordinates: 51°13′2″N 4°24′33″E

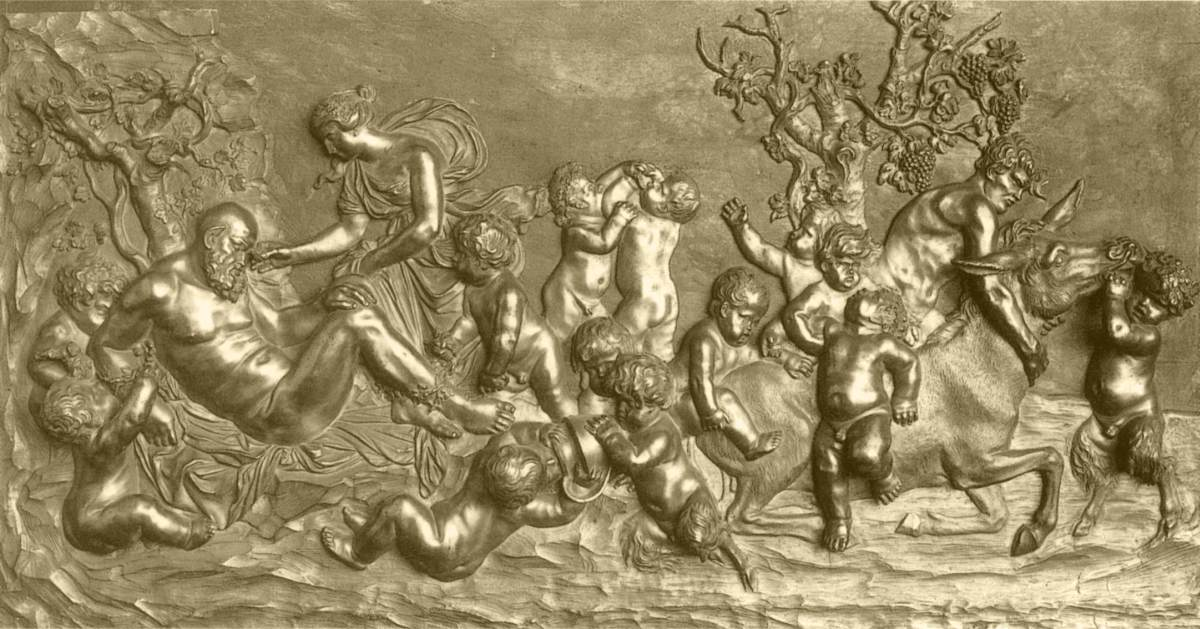
- Copy of Sleeping Silenus
- Artist: François Duquesnoy
- Year: 1620s
- Type: Relief
- Medium: Bronze
- Location: Rubenshuis, Antwerp

Sleeping Silenus is a bronze relief by Flemish sculptor François Duquesnoy. The original relief in marble was completed by Duquesnoy in the early 17th century. The original Sleeping Silenus is known today only through copies. A well-preserved version in bronze is currently housed at Rubenshuis in Antwerp.

== Relief ==
According to Bellori, the Silenus relief is "an invention according to the poetry of Virgil." Virgil's fourth eclogue goes thus:

In a cave, two boys
Chromis, and Mnasylos, Silenus found
Lying asleep, all swollen with the wine
Of yesterday, as always he is seen.
His garlands lay beyond, fall'n from his head;
His heavy wine-jar from worn handle hung:
They seize him (for he oft had promised fair
To sing them songs) and bind, with his own wreaths
Now comes the fairest of the Naiads near,
Ægle, encouraging the coward boys,
And, as he opes his eyes, she with the juice
Of mulberries, stains his brows and temples red.

In the relief, Silenus is leaning against a vitis, sleeping off his intoxication. Some putti are tying him up with shoots, while a nymph, Aegle, is smearing his face with mulberries. To the right, there are satyrs prodding Silenus' donkey, opening its mouth to make it stand up.

The version housed at the Rubenshuis was cast in bronze, with an expensive background in lapis lazuli. The Antwerp relief might come from the collection of Philip IV of Spain, where it might have arrived as a gift from Francesco Barberini, perhaps together with Duquesnoy's Bacchanal of Putti, which according to Bellori was indeed sent as a gift to the king by Barberini.
