= The Physician (disambiguation) =

The Physician may refer to:

- The Physician, a 1986 novel by Noah Gordon
- The Physician (1928 film), a British silent drama film directed by Georg Jacoby
- The Physician (2013 film), a German drama film directed by Philipp Stölzl
- The Physician (Dou), a 1653 painting by Gerrit Dou
