= Bacchanal of Putti =

Marble relief by Flemish sculptor François Duquesnoy

Coordinates: 41.8939°N 12.4722°E

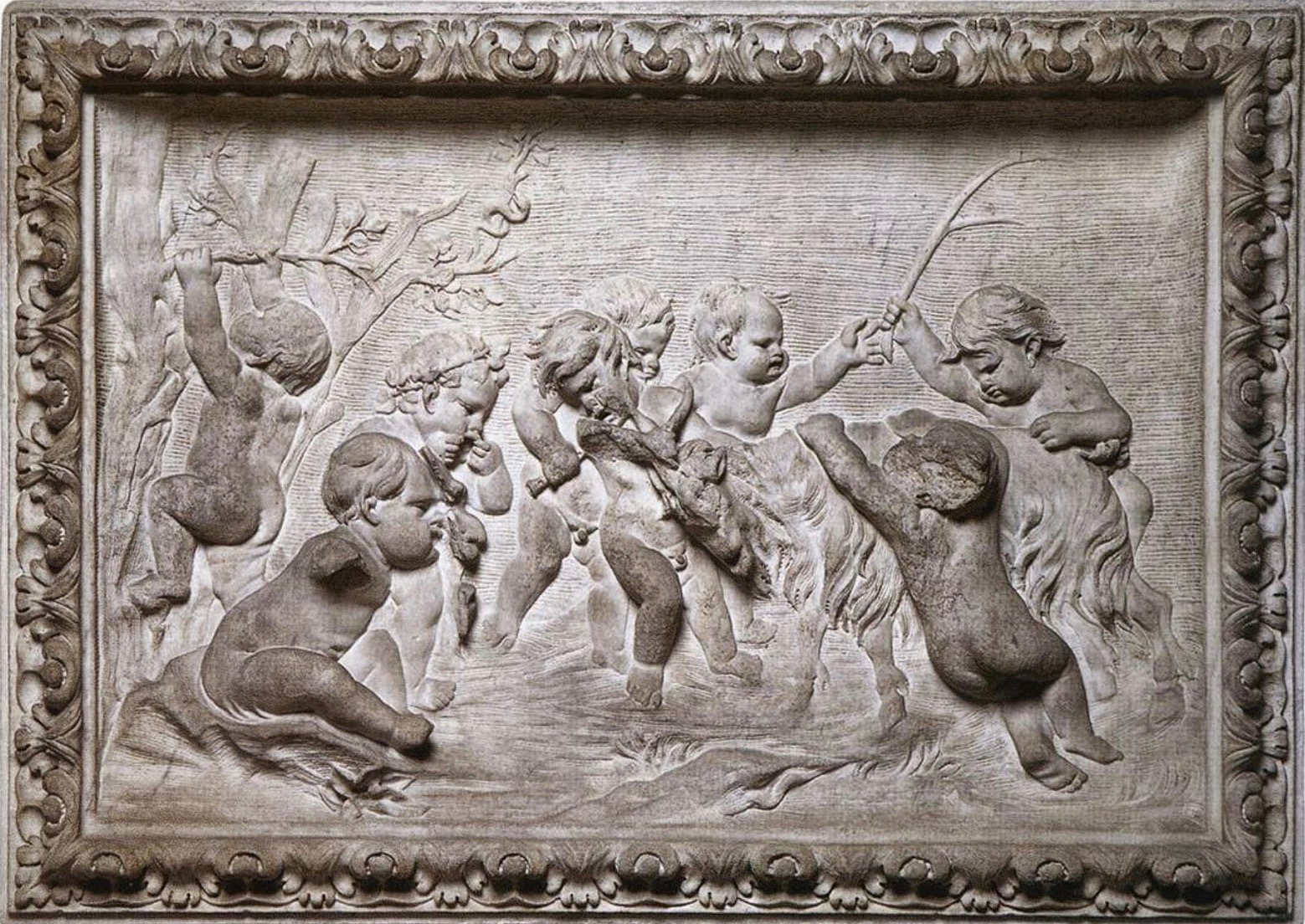
- Duquesnoy's Bacchanal of Putti
- Artist: François Duquesnoy
- Year: 1620s
- Type: Relief
- Medium: Marble
- Location: Galleria Doria Pamphilj; Rome

The Bacchanal of Putti or Bacchanal of Putti with a Goat is a marble relief by Flemish sculptor François Duquesnoy. The commissioner of this relief is unknown.

== Relief ==
Regarding this oeuvre, Gian Pietro Bellori said:

[Duquesnoy] fece una Baccanale della medesima grandezza [as the Victory of Sacred Love over Profane Love relief], con putti che tirano per le corna, e sferzano una capra, figuratovi il Giuoco che è un fanciullo, il quale si pone al volto una maschera, & il modello di creta fu imitato, e scolpito, sul porfido da Tomaso Fedele, Romano chiamato Tomaso del porfido, per la facilità sua nel lavorarlo, e condurlo con tenerezza in perfezione, come veramente riuscì questo mezzorilievo che dal Signor Cardinale Francesco Barberini fu donato a Filippo Quarto Re di Spagna, e si conserva oggi in Madrid nel palazzo del re

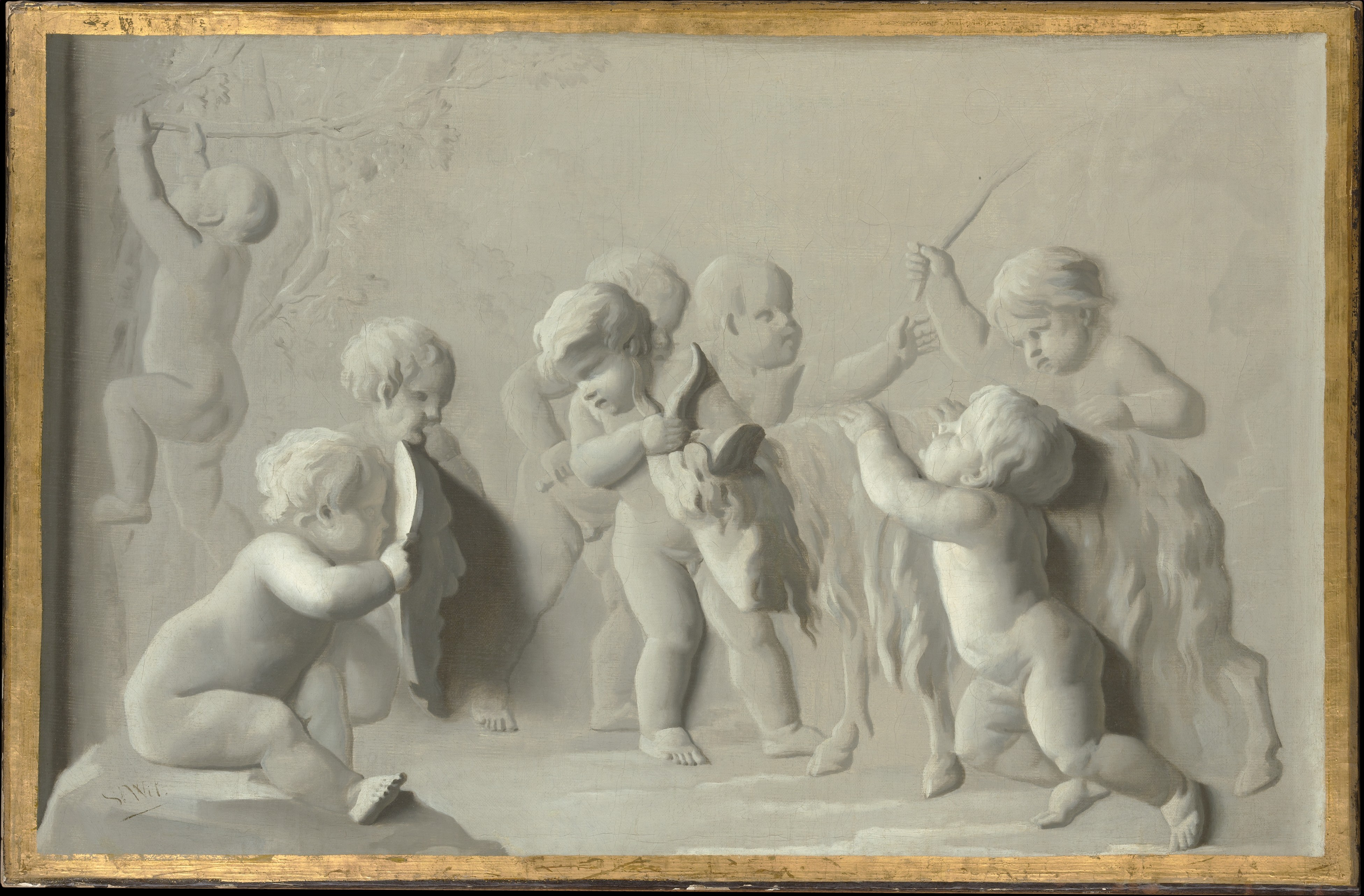
Oil on canvas copy at the Met

The relief shows a group of putti pulling a goat by the horns. One of them is lashing it with a stick, while the putto next to him is reaching his left hand to the hovering stick. One putto is hanging over the goat's back with both hands, while another putto is breaking another stick off a tree to the left. Bellori says that the model in chalk was imitated by a local sculptor noted for his work with porphyry. According to Bellori, Cardinal Francesco Barberini donated the relief to Philip IV of Spain, and at the time of writing it was kept at the Royal Palace of Madrid. The relief is currently housed at the Galleria Doria Pamphili in Rome.

Duquesnoy's Bacchanal of Putti is closely related to Nicolas Poussin's own paintings. Both Duquesnoy's Bacchanal of Putti and Poussin's painting of the same name reflect the study of ancient sarcophagi of the Flemish sculptor and the French painter. Duquesnoy would go on to improve his putti, until he reached the apotheosis of the putto with his putti of the Tomb of Ferdinand van den Eynde.
