= The Physician (Dou) =

Painting by Gerrit Dou

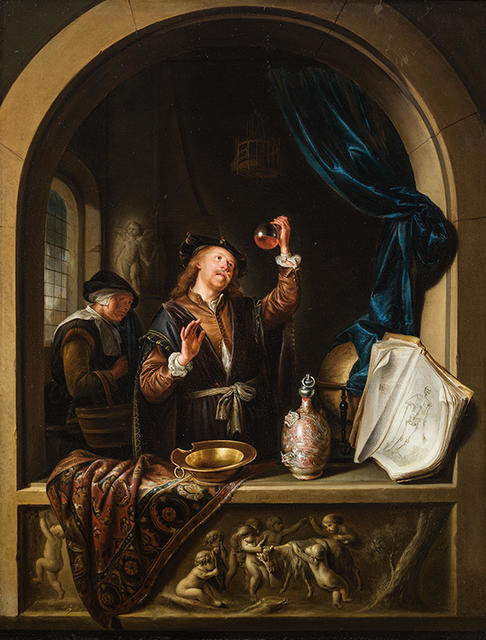
The Physician (1653) by Gerrit Dou

The Physician ("Doctor Studying a Bottle") is a 1653 oil painting by Dutch Golden Age artist Gerrit Dou, and is now part of the Christchurch Art Gallery. It exists in two versions: one (oil on copper sheet) in the Christchurch Art Gallery and the other in the Kunsthistorisches Museum. Vienna.

== Description ==
The artwork is a typical Leiden fijnschilders Dutch style "niche painting" of the 17th century. It depicts a figure (the physician) holding a bottle of orange liquid up to the light. A nosy maid or patient pokes her head around her basket to see what the physician (or, to the maid, her master) is doing. The theme is that of a common medical practice of uroscopy, and this popular art subject is commonly called a "piskijker" in Dutch inventories. The physician is painted with the features of Dou himself, and another version is in the Kunsthistorisches Museum. The relief below the window of children by Francois Duquesnoy was one that Dou repeated for many of his “niche paintings.” The open book is Andreas Vesalius' 'De human corpora fabrica illustrated by Vesalius and Stephan von Calcar, of the school of Titian, and published in 1543.

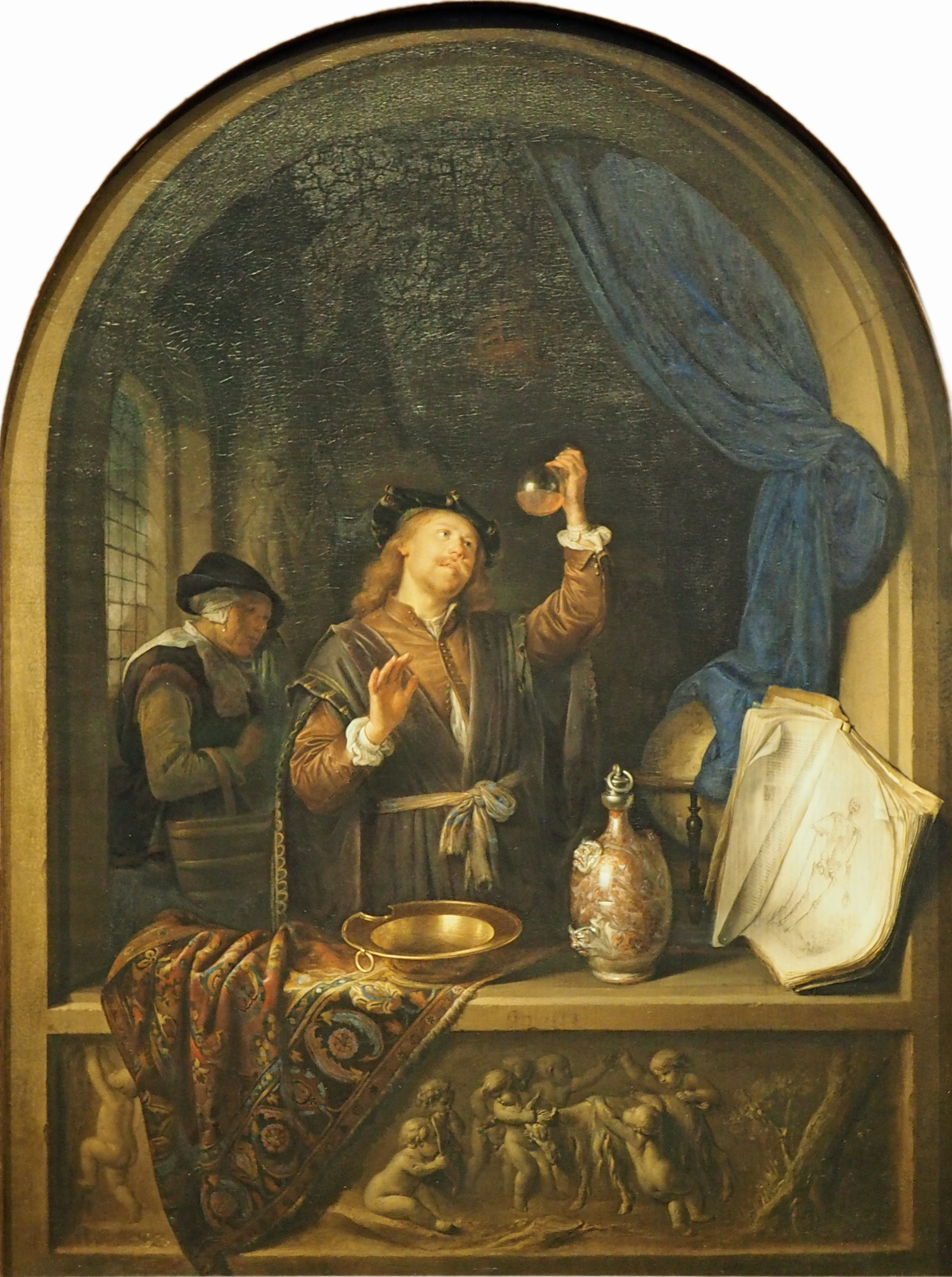
Version in Vienna

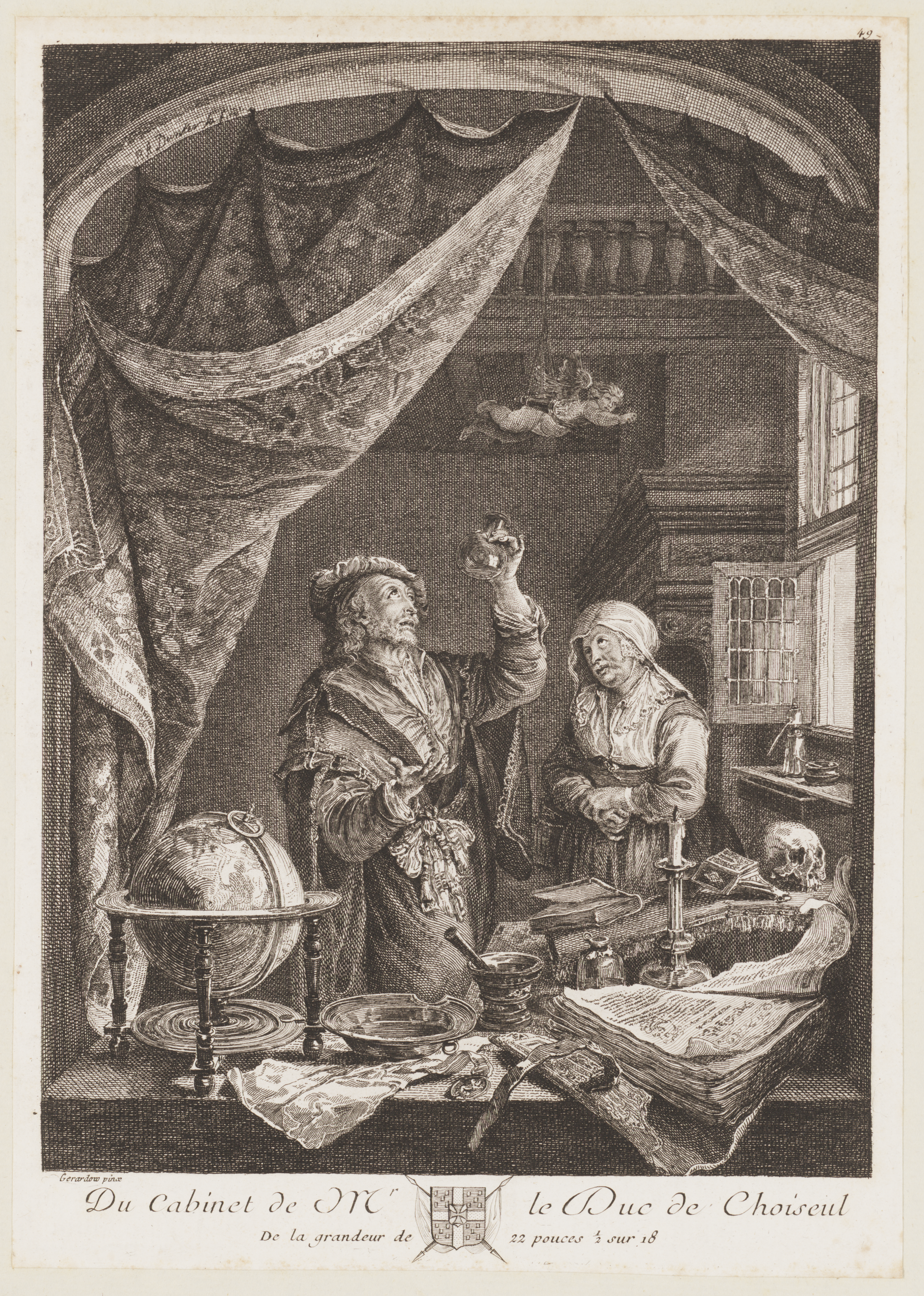
Version owned by Étienne François, duc de Choiseul
