= Children Playing with a Goat =

Painting in the style of Jacob de Wit

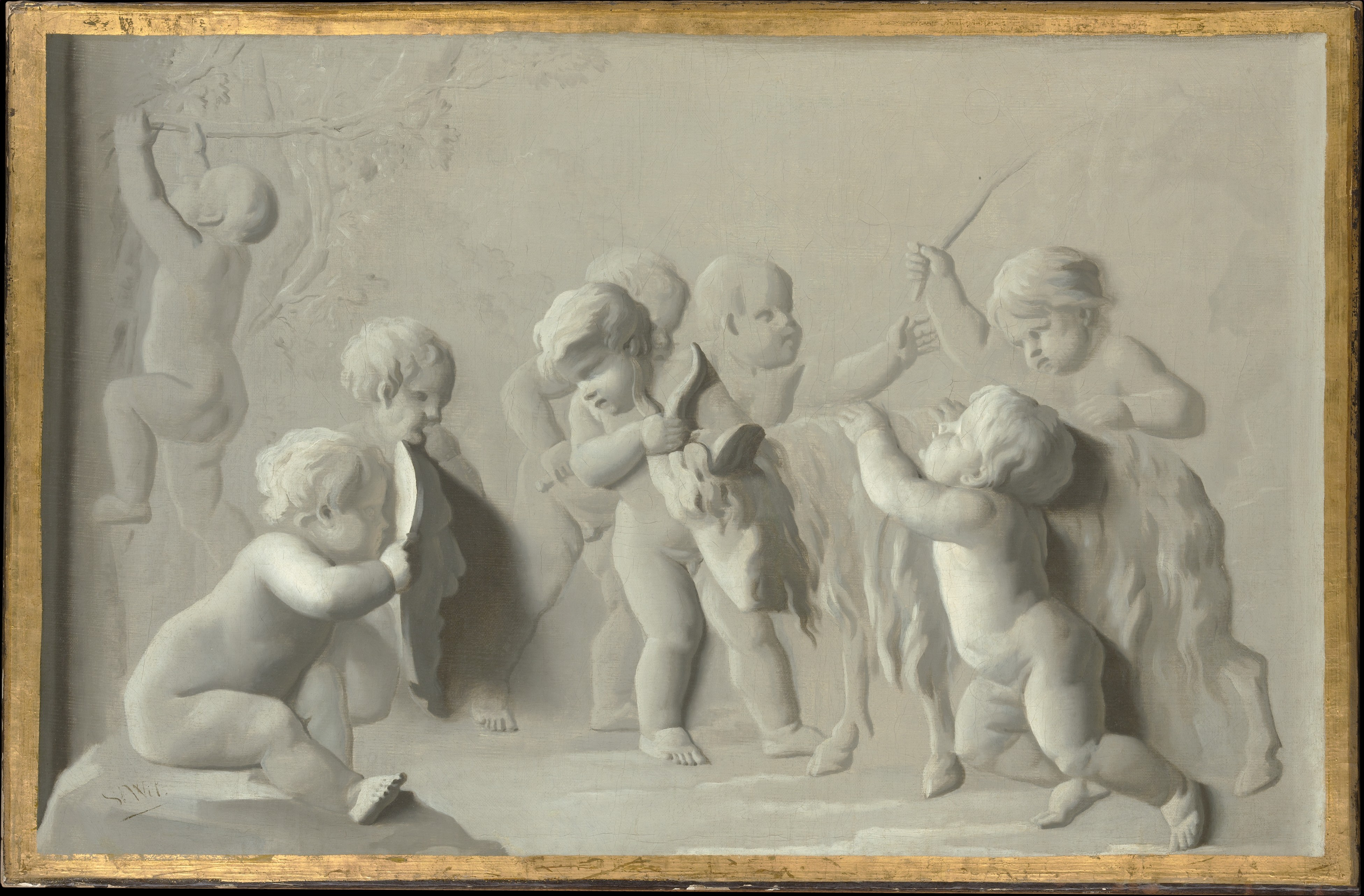
- Year: 18th century
- Medium: oil paint, canvas
- Dimensions: 67.9 cm (26.7 in) × 104.1 cm (41.0 in)
- Location: Metropolitan Museum of Art
- Accession: 07.225.257

Children Playing with a Goat is an 18th-century grisaille painting in the style of Jacob de Wit, known as a "witje". It is an oil painting on canvas depicting a relief of children playing with a goat after a relief by Francois Duquesnoy. It is in the collection of the Metropolitan Museum of Art.

== Description ==
Several paintings of this specific scene dating from the 17th century and 18th century have survived, and sometimes these were incorporated into other paintings. Though the paintings themselves have survived, the interpretation has not. In general, the popularity of putti in "witjes" as overdoors or room panels had to do with a trompe-l'œil effect when the viewer walks into a room. Stucco work as a decorative scheme was quite popular in the Netherlands from the late 17th century throughout the 18th century, but these imitation-stucco paintings were valued for their cleverness, their clarity even on a cloudy day without shadows, and of course the ease with which they could be moved and reinstalled, an aspect which has made them also difficult to trace. In fact, the genre itself existed well before De Wit was active and they were just called "grauwtjes" (little grays, or grisailles), and through De Wit's art they slowly became known as "witjes" (little whites). The shadows in the painting are supposed to be aligned with the light source, so in this case, the painting was probably an overdoor with a window on the left. The painter Jacob de Wit excelled at this "painting of putti in a bas-relief" style of grisaille, and though no original autograph version of this specific scene is known, the art historian Hessel Miedema discovered two "grauwtjes" by De Wit after reliefs by Duquesnoy in the estate sale of Lambert ten Kate. According to Walter Liedtke, a comparison of this painting with autograph "witjes", however, shows that it is not as masterful as an actual Jacob de Wit.

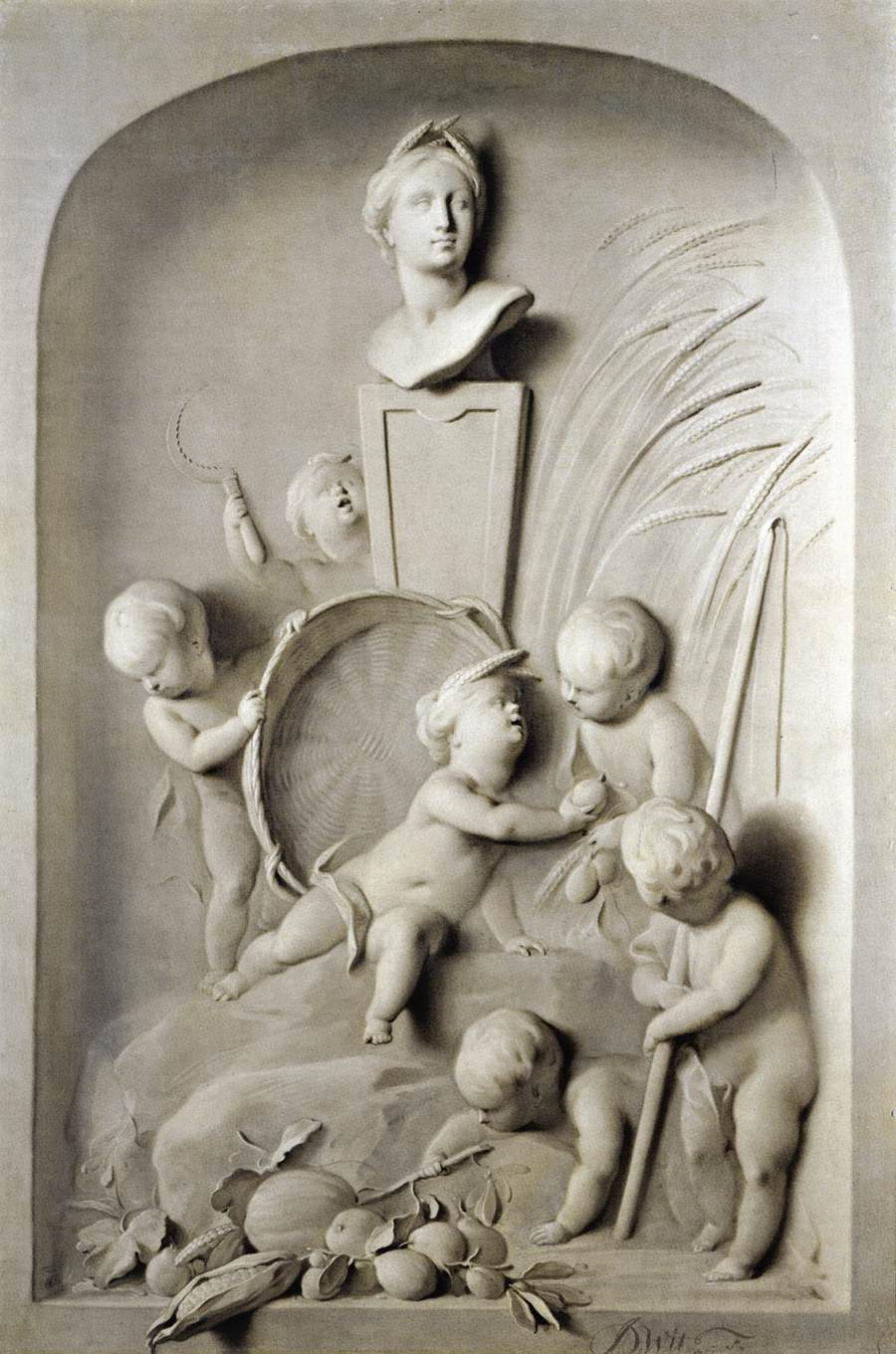
Witjes by De Wit seem to "pop out" of the canvas

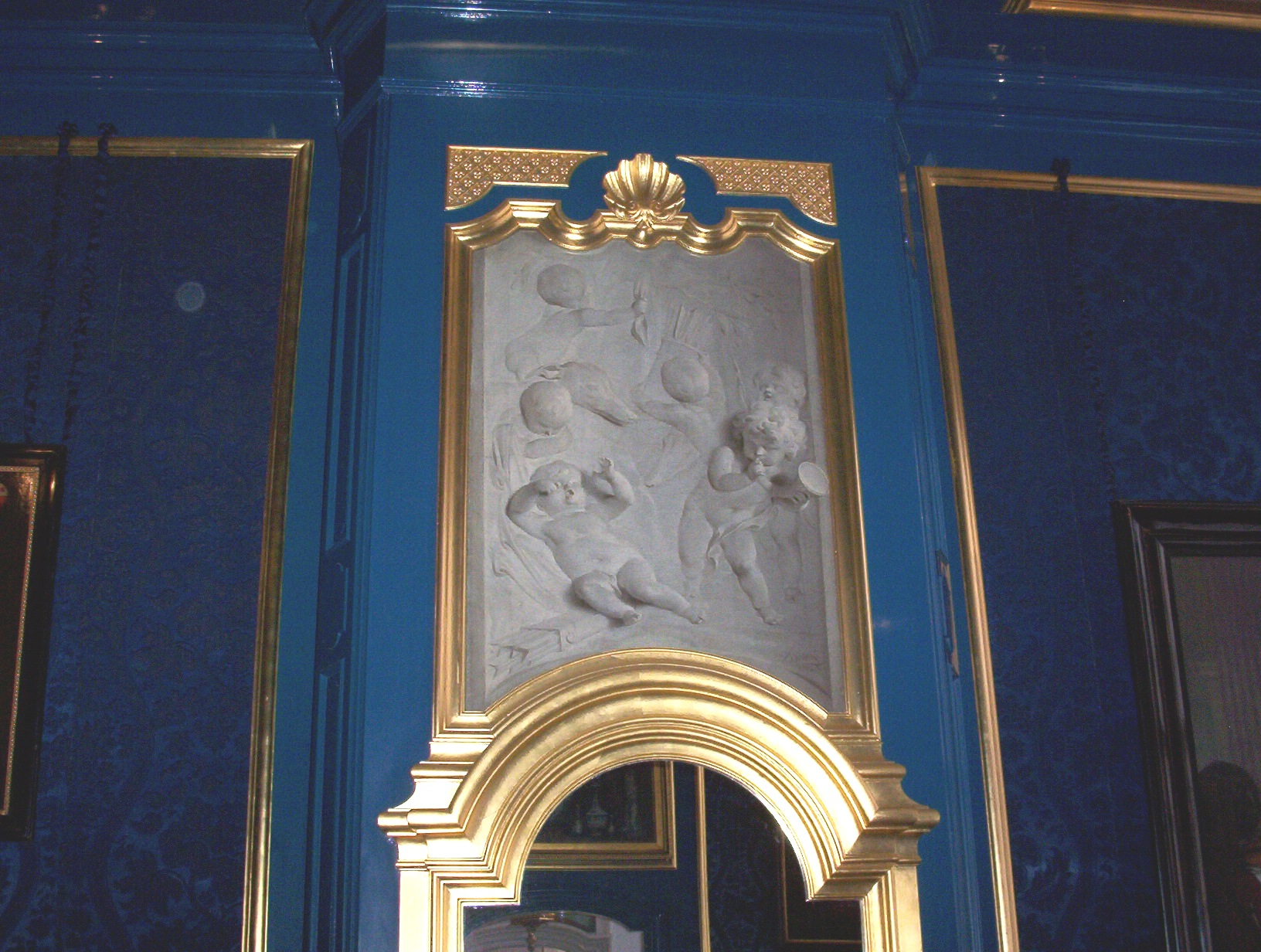
A De Wit overdoor with window on the right

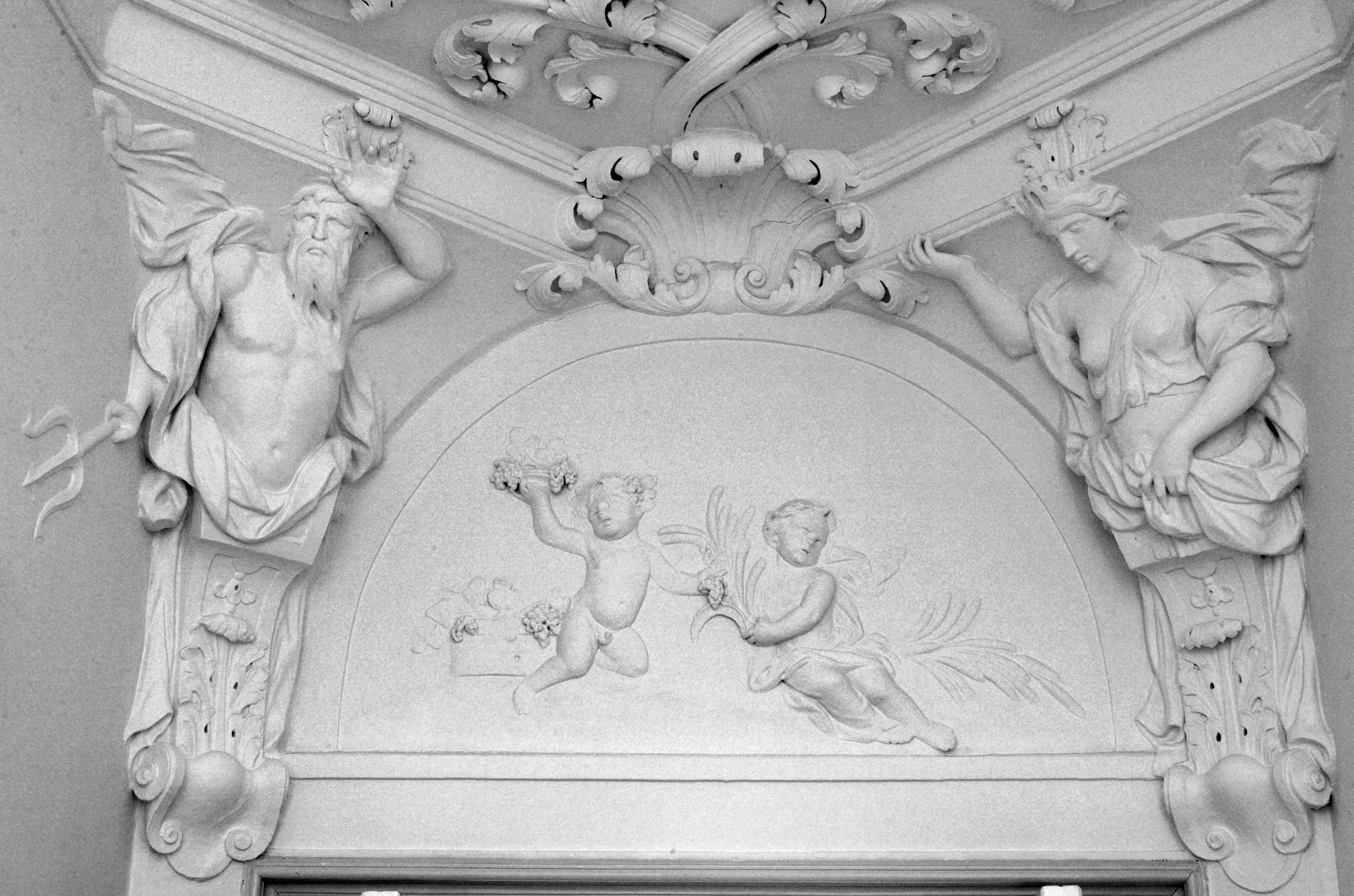
Actual stucco in Herengracht 436

The reason this painting is important for the art historical record has therefore more to do with its subject than with its painterly qualities. Indeed, the subject is featured in another painting owned by the Metropolitan Museum of Art, namely their self-portrait by Gerard Dou. This painting came into the collection via the John Pierpont Morgan bequest, and the Dou was bequeathed by Benjamin Altman. In Dou's case, he painted this scene several times in the lower "balcony" part of his popular "niche paintings" and the art historian Hofstede de Groot would just refer to it as "well-known relief by Duquesnoy of children playing with a he-goat".

Known versions by Dou:

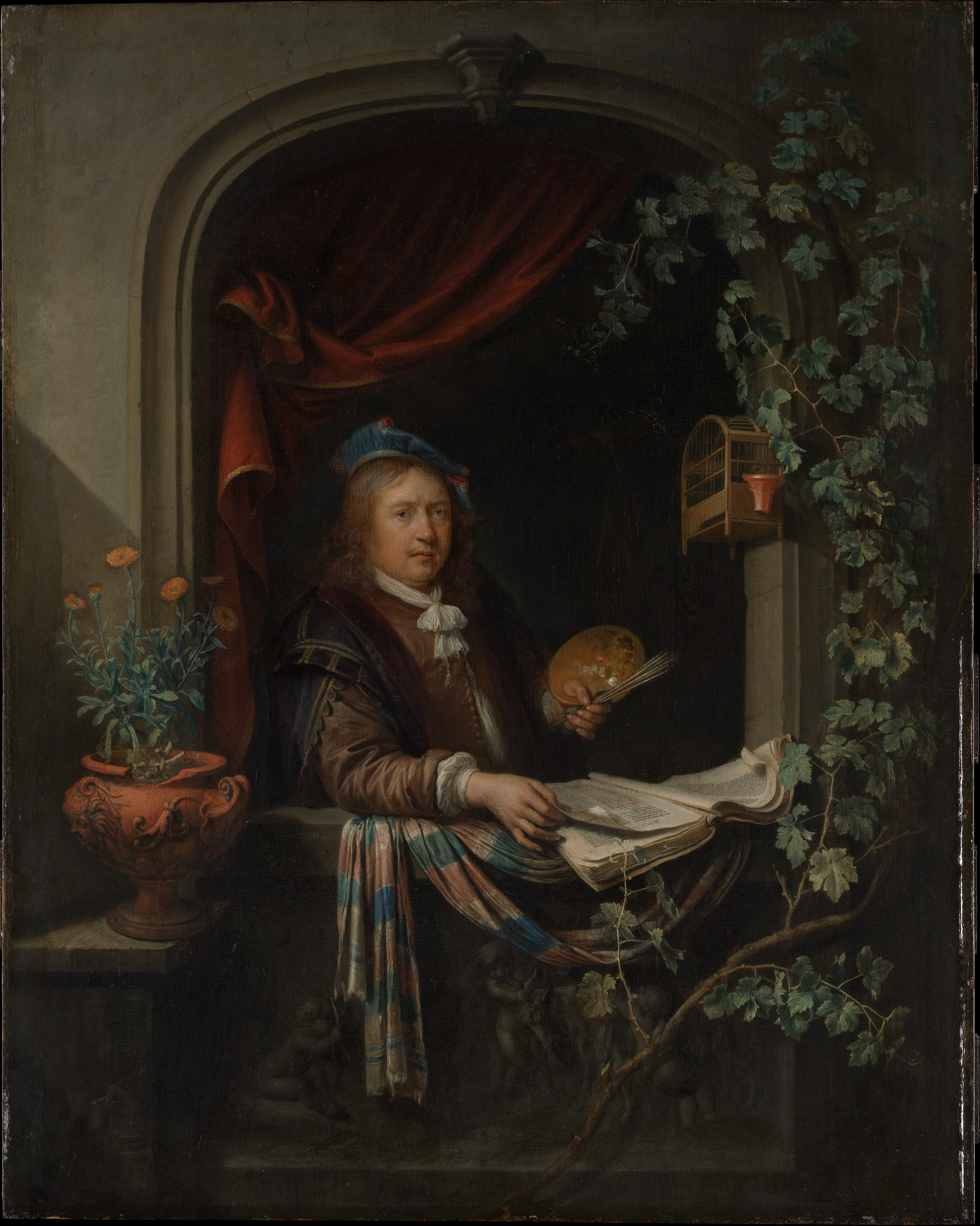
Self-Portrait (Dou, New York)

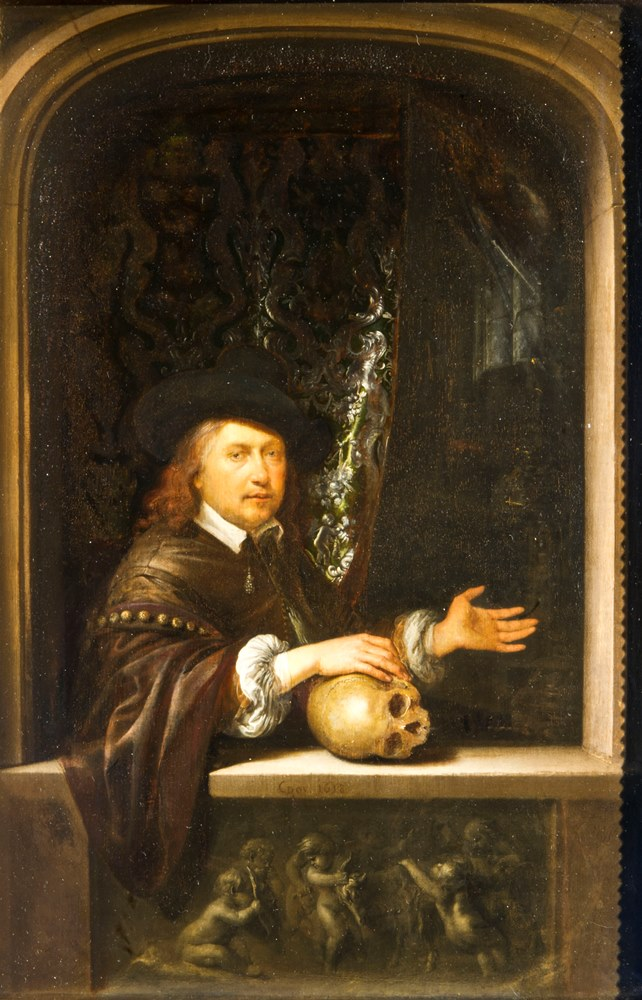
Self-Portrait, Uffizi

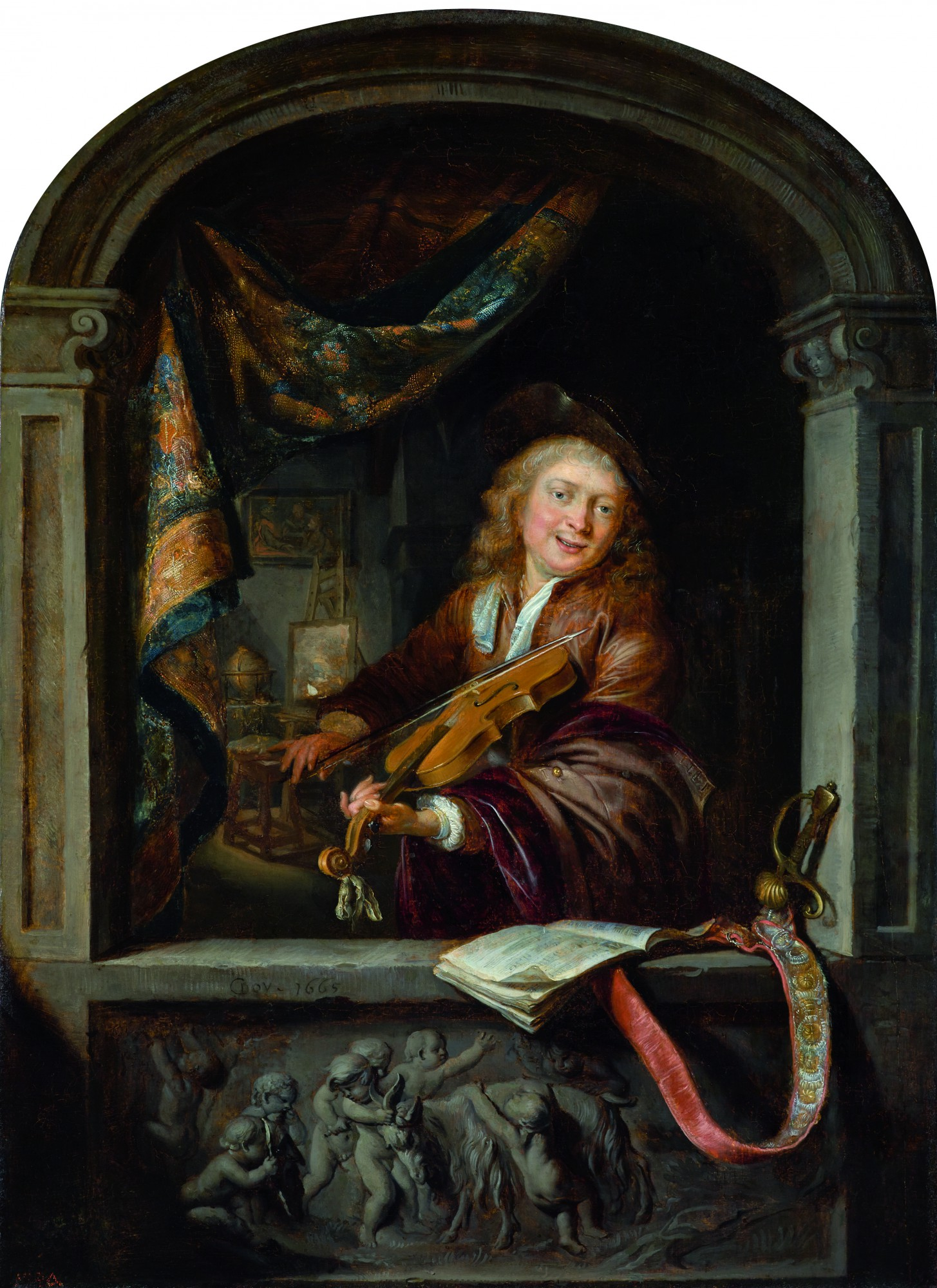
The Violinist

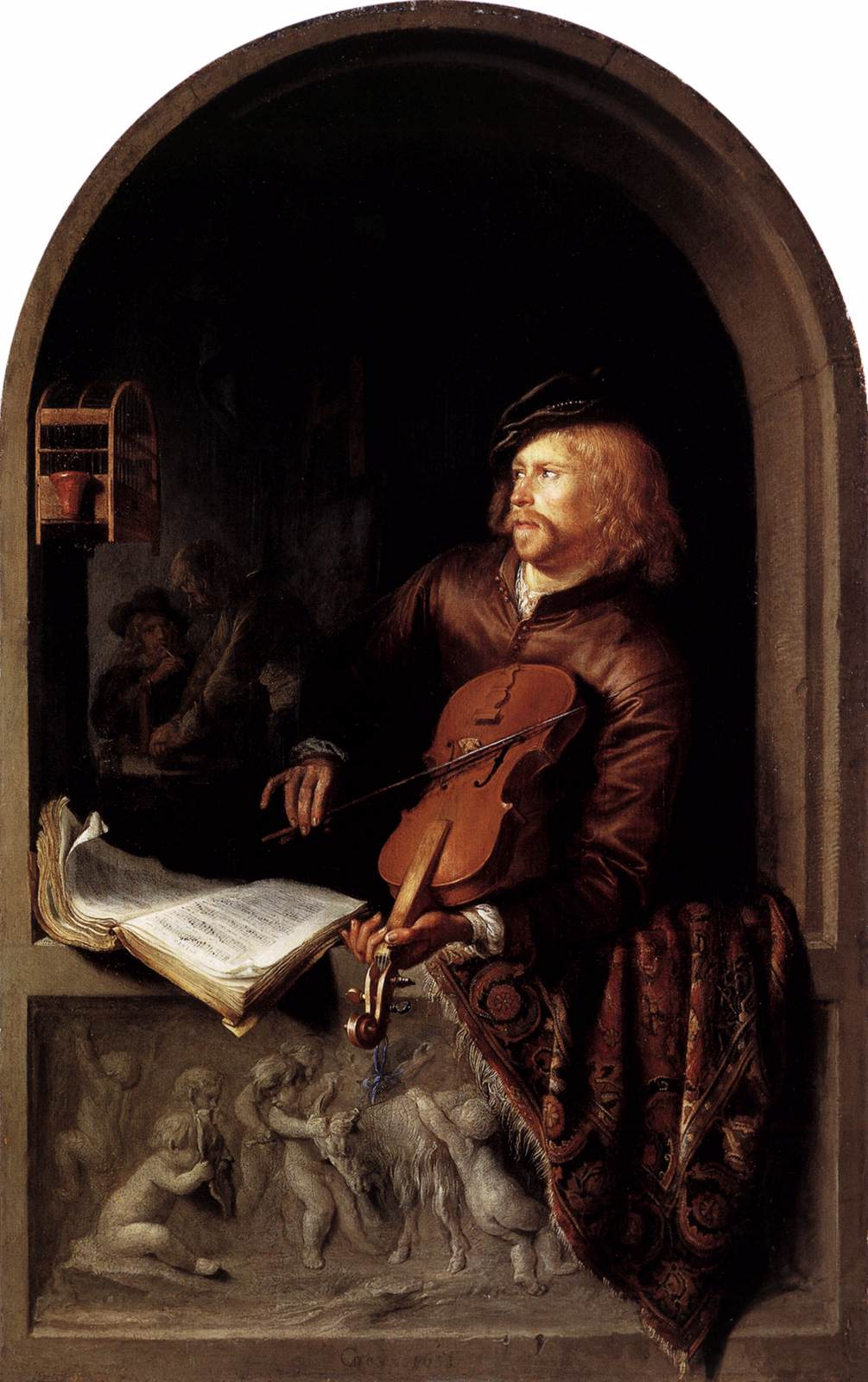
The Violin Player

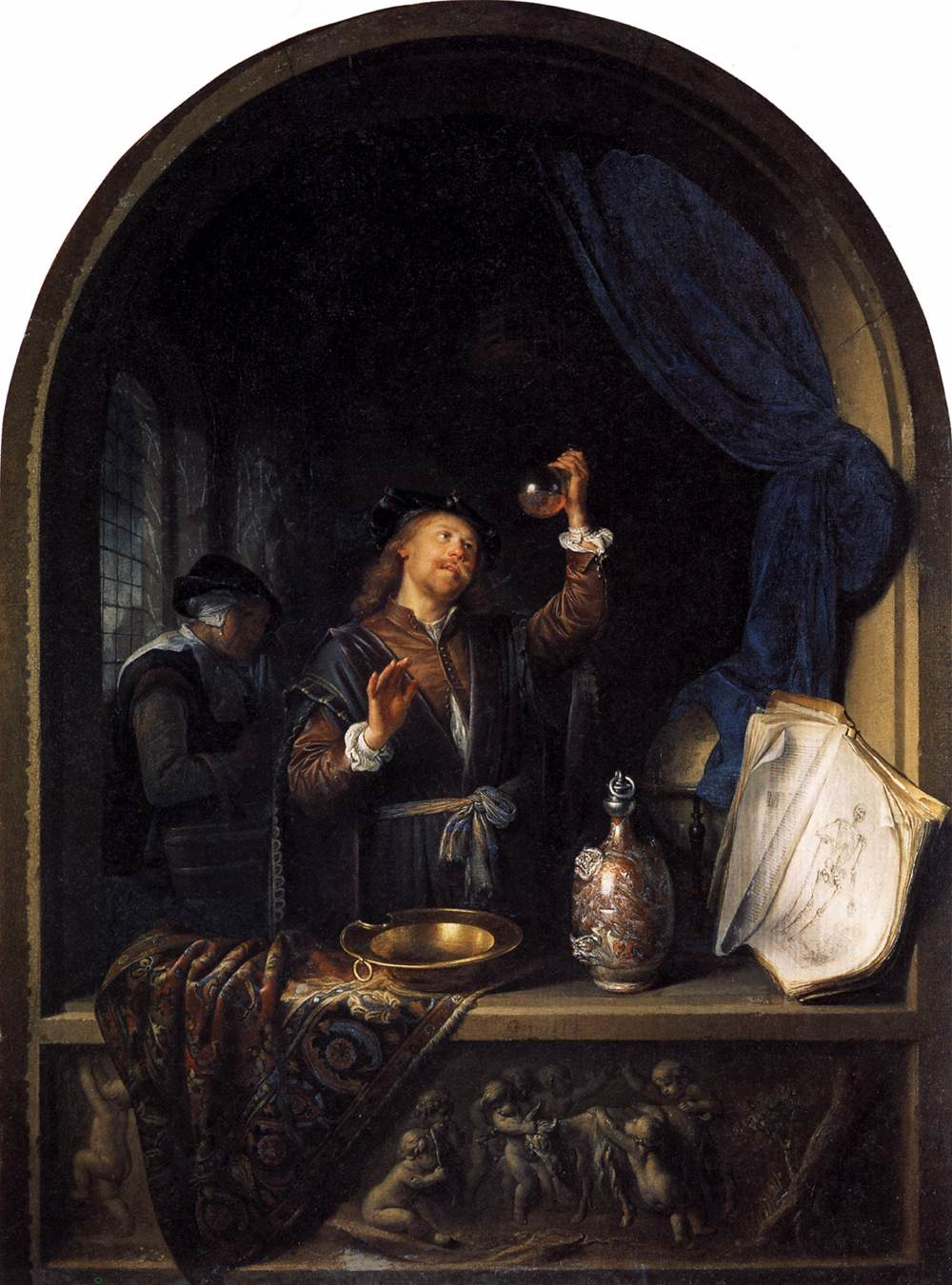
The Doctor

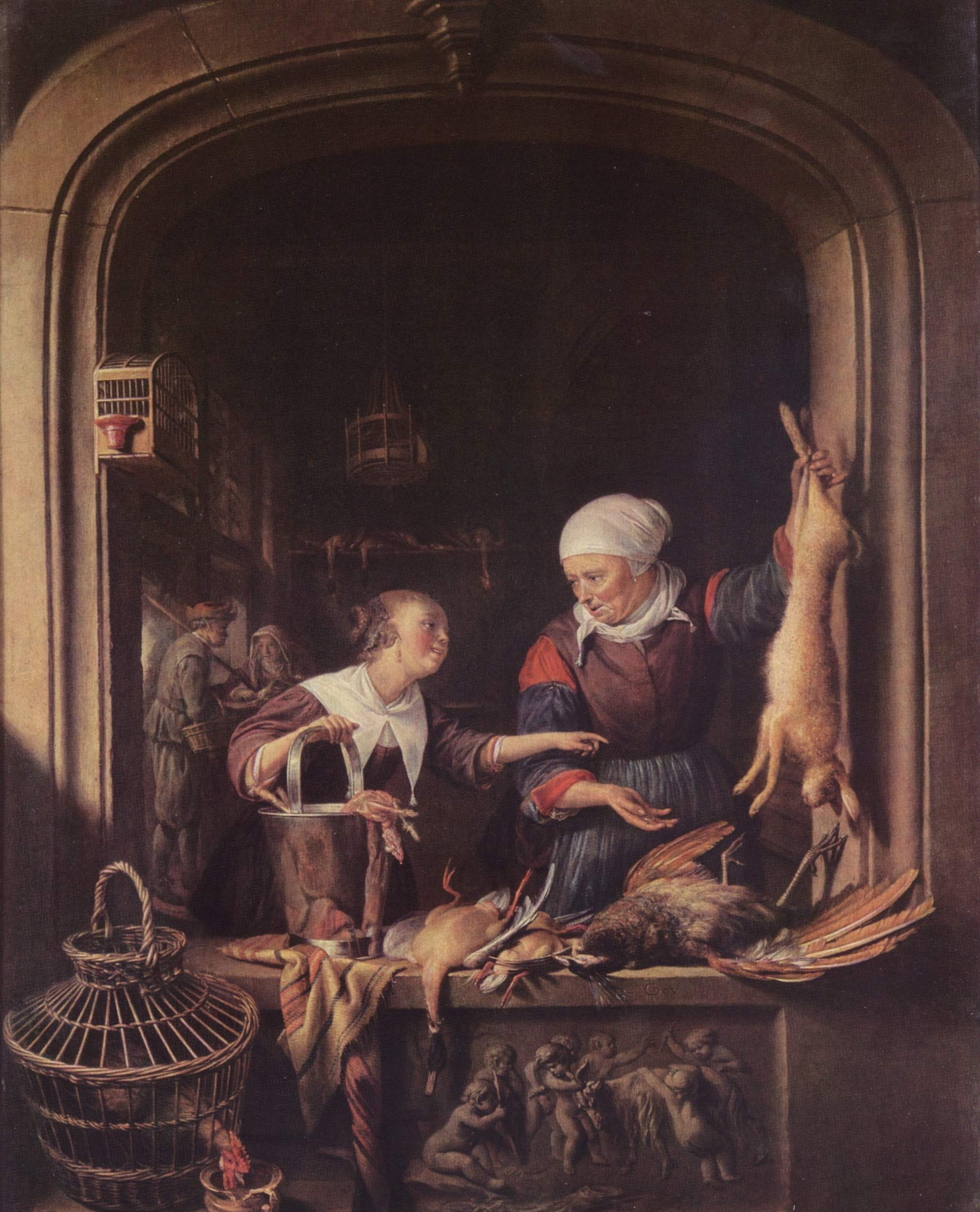
A Poulterer's Shop

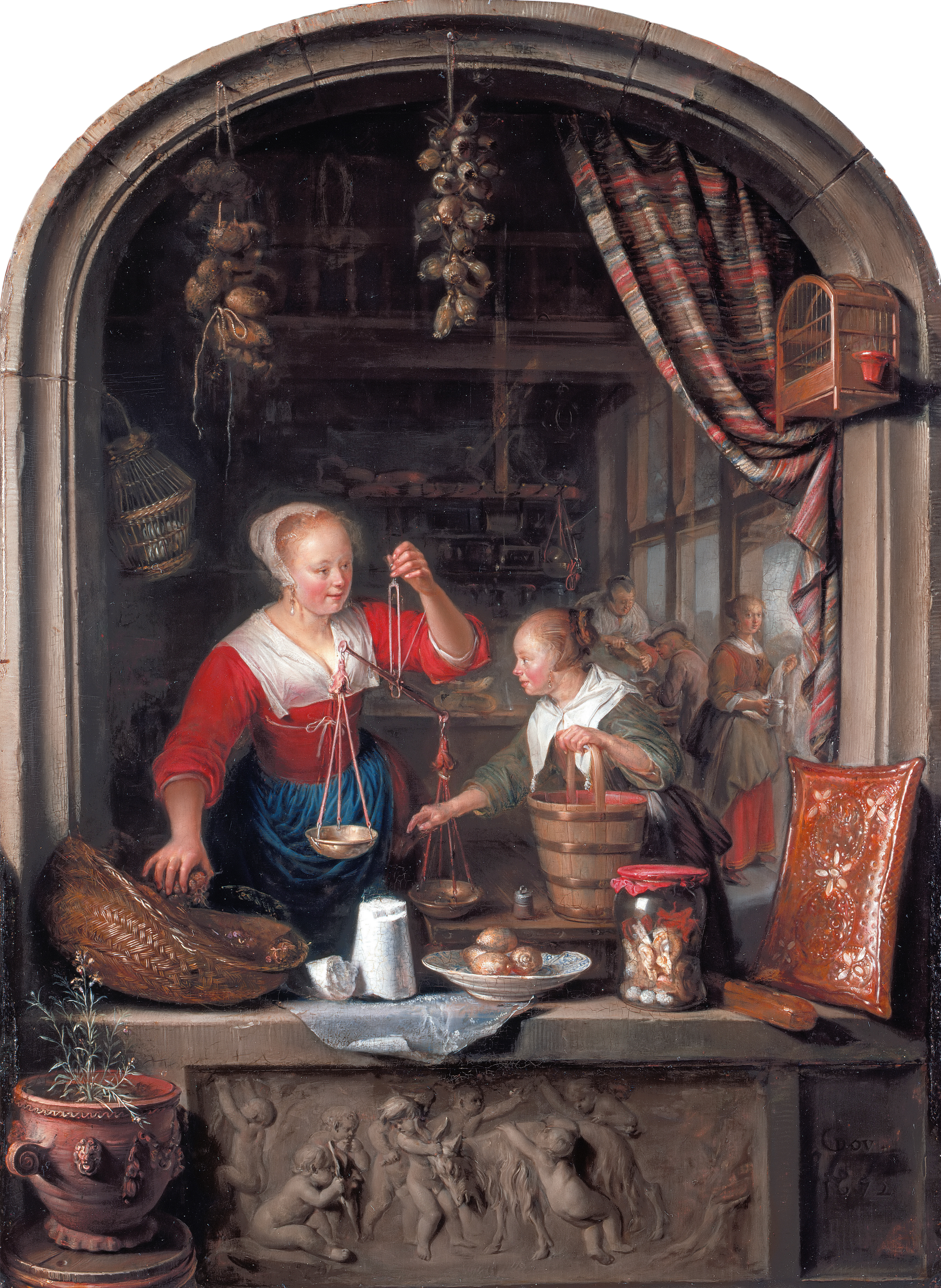
The Grocer's Shop

The popularity of "witjes" as a decorative element, but also as a collector's item, caused De Wit to have many followers, including Piat Sauvage, who also created a copy of the same Children Playing with a Goat theme. Two of Sauvage's trompe-l'œil bas-reliefs are also in the J.P. Morgan bequest, though it is unknown whether Morgan knew about Sauvage's copy of the other painting in his collection:

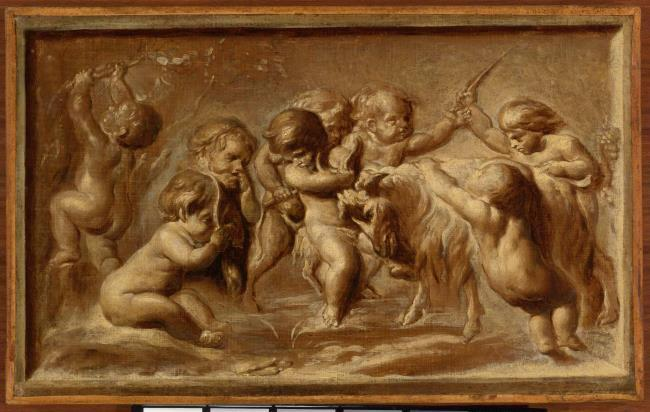
Children Playing with a Goat

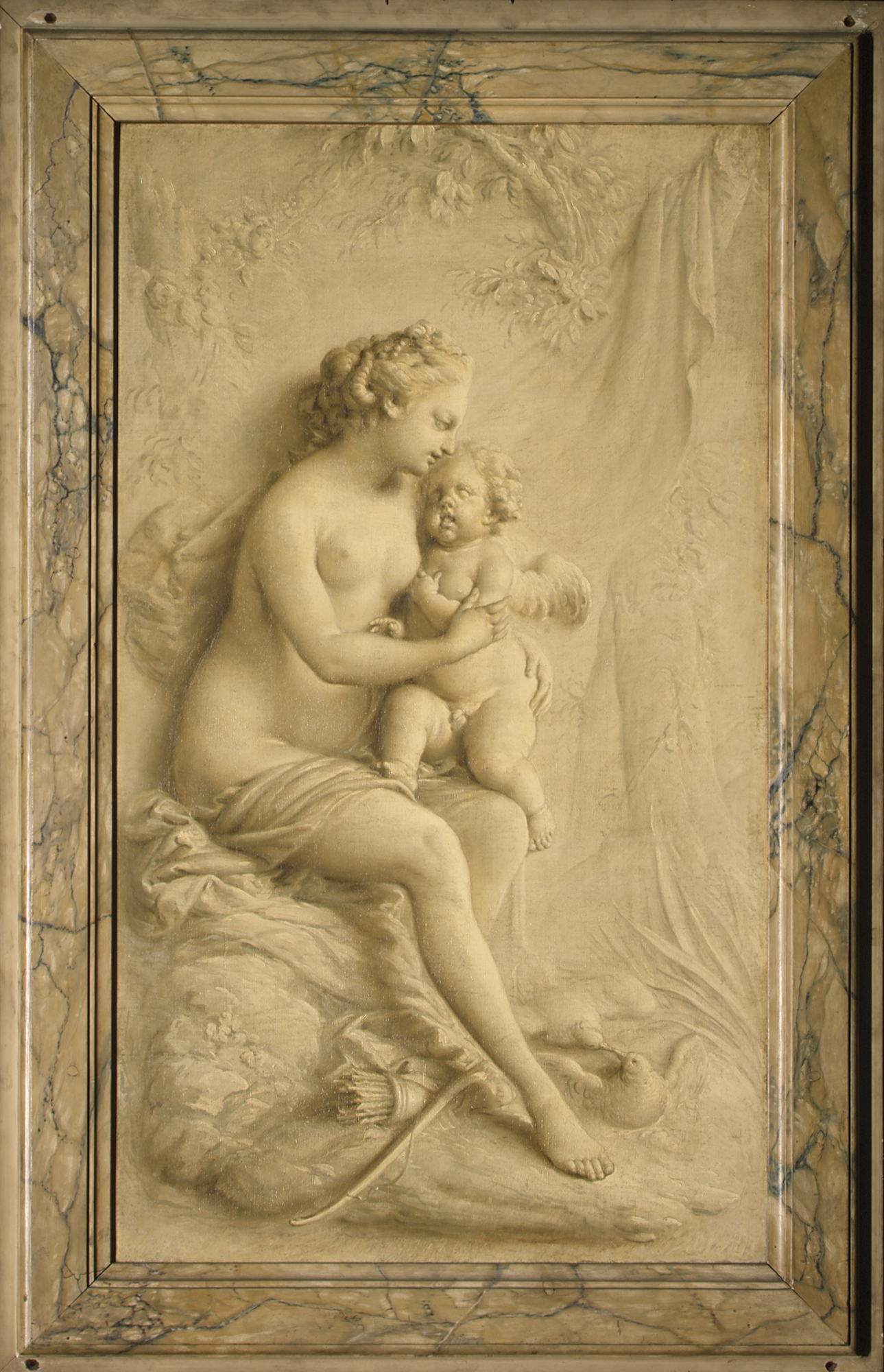
Venus and Cupid

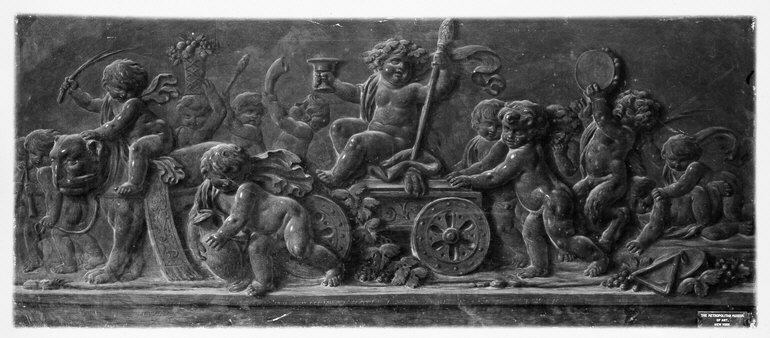
The Triumph of Bacchus

== Putti with a Goat theme ==
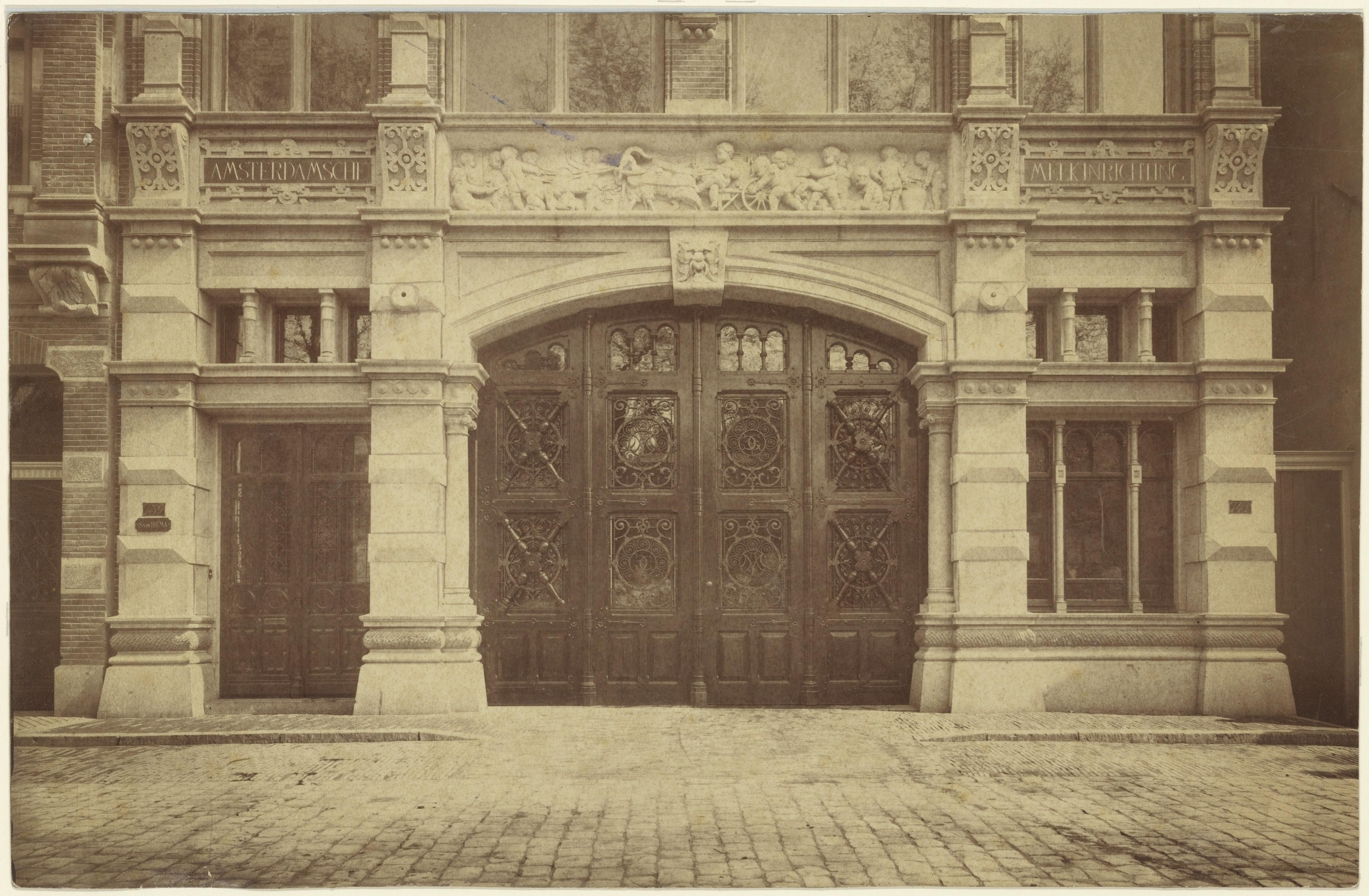
Putti with a Goat, by P.E. van den Bossche on an Amsterdam building designed by Pierre Cuypers

The subject remained popular through the 19th century, when it was used by the sculptor P.E. van den Bossche for a sculpted frieze above the doors of a building on the Prinsengracht in Amsterdam.
