= Victory of Sacred Love over Profane Love =

Coordinates: 41.8939°N 12.4722°E

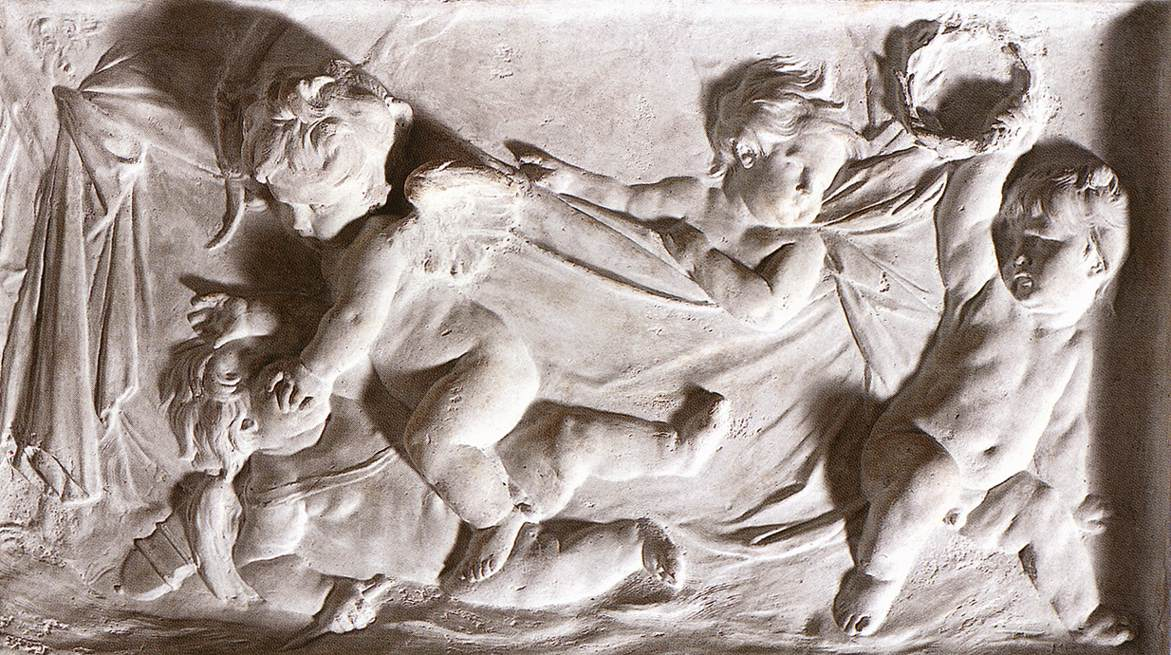
- Stucco model of Victory of Sacred Love over Profane Love, Galleria Spada, Rome
- Artist: François Duquesnoy
- Year: Early 17th century
- Type: Relief
- Medium: Marble
- Location: Galleria Doria Pamphilj; Rome

The Victory of Sacred Love over Profane Love is a marble relief by Flemish sculptor François Duquesnoy. The patron of the relief is unknown. However, the oeuvre's stucco copy came into the possession of Cardinal Bernardino Spada (1594 – 1661) early on. The original marble relief is currently housed at the Galleria Doria Pamphilj in Rome. A stucco copy is housed at the Galleria Spada in Rome.

== Relief ==
Gian Pietro Bellori described this oeuvre thusly:

[Duquesnoy] figurò l'Amor divino che abbatte l'Amor profano calcandolo [sic] col piede, e chiudendogli la bocca con la mano, per farlo tacere, mentre un'altro [sic] fanciullo inalza [sic] la corona di lauro in premio della vittoria immortale

According to Bellori, Duquesnoy pushed for the commission of such a relief after becoming fascinated with the subject of the putti. This, according to Bellori, happened after Duquesnoy observed Titian's putti (incidentally, Titian also produced a painting with the same title as Duquesnoy's relief, Sacred and Profane Love). Duquesnoy would later revise and markedly improve his putti, becoming the greatest master in the representation of the winged infants and setting an example for other sculptors to follow with the putti of the Tomb of Ferdinand van den Eynde.

According to Lingo, there is a poem ("The Battle of Sacred and Profane Love") in Pope Urban VIII's Poëmata that is associable with Duquesnoy's opus. In that poem, "Urban envisioned his conflicting spiritual and worldly desires as twin loves in vigorous combat."

In the relief, the Sacred Love's putto smacks down the Profane Love's putto by kicking him and shutting his mouth with his hand, "so as to silence him." Another putto raises a laurel wreath in sign of everlasting victory. The relief is remarkable for the careful treatment of the surfaces and its "subtly graduated layers."
