= Daniel Mijtens the Younger =

Dutch Golden Age painter (1644–1688)

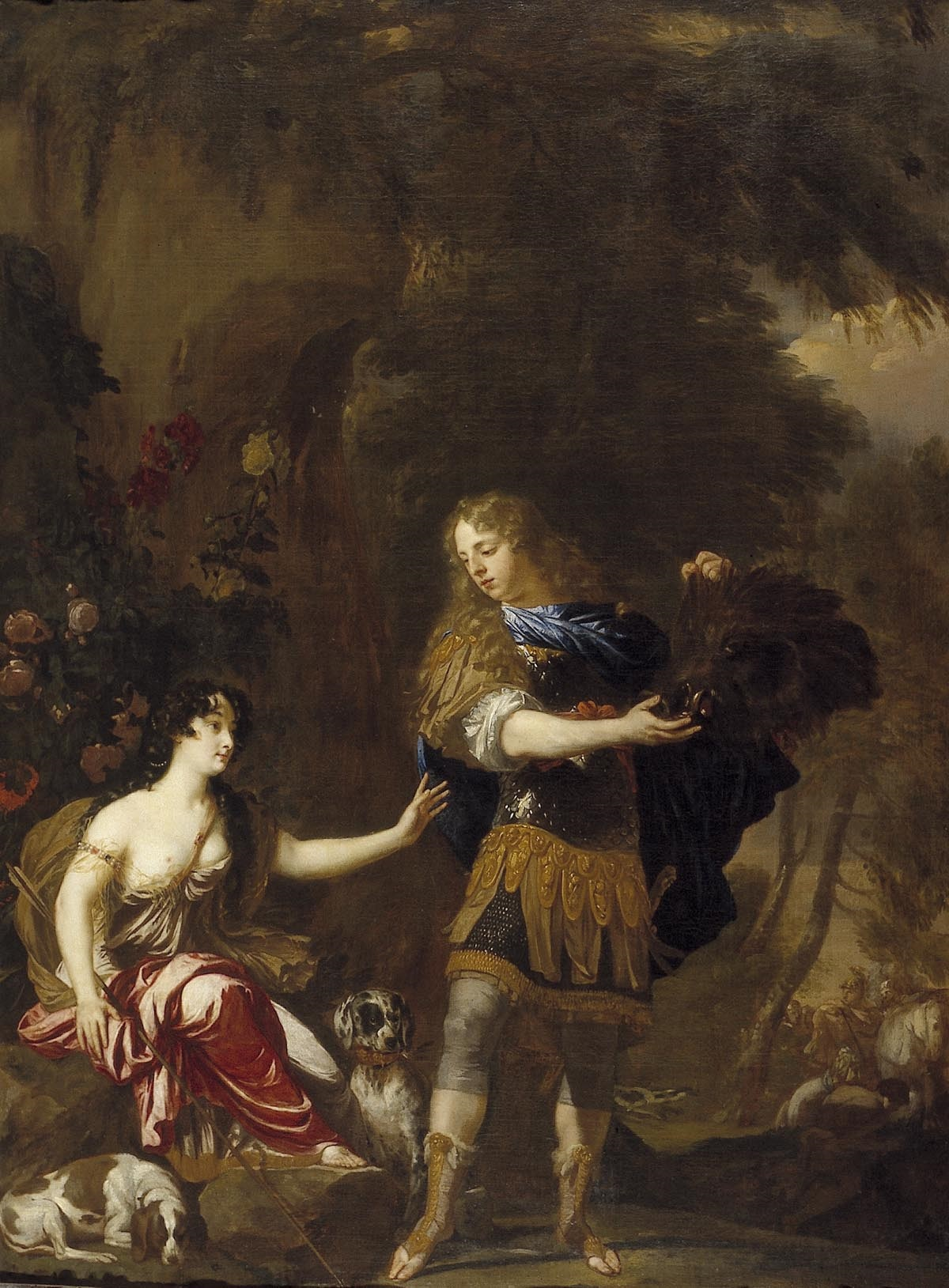
Meleager presenting the head of the Calydonian Boar to Atalanta.

Daniël Mijtens the Younger (Dutch pronunciation: [ˈdaːnijɛl ˈmɛitəns]; 7 August 1644 in The Hague – buried on 23 September 1688 in The Hague) was a Dutch Golden Age painter and the son of Daniel Mytens the Elder, although some early sources indicate that his father was Jan Mijtens. His year of birth is sometimes given as 1636 or 1647.

== Biography ==
According to a biography by Arnold Houbraken, Mijtens travelled to Italy in 1666, where he became friends with Carlo Maratta and studied with Johann Carl Loth. he also joined the Bentvueghels and took the nickname "Bontekraay" (The Hooded Crow).

From 1672 to 1688, he was back in The Hague and was one of the 48 signers of the founding charter of the Confrerie Pictura in the Hague, and painted one of the four corner pieces of the ceiling of the "Boterwaag" where the guild members met. The other corners were painted by Theodor van der Schuer, Augustinus Terwesten, and Robbert Duval. Later, he joined with them to create the Royal Academy of Art.

According to the RKD, he was a pupil of his father, who was court painter in the Hague, and his uncle. He is known for mythological subjects, interior decorations and portraits. His pupils were Lourens Bruyning, Nicolaes Hooft, Mattheus Terwesten, and Elias Vinie.
