= Johannes Gottlieb Glauber =

Dutch Golden Age painter

Johannes Gottlieb Glauber (1656–1703) was a Dutch Golden Age painter.

== Biography ==
Glauber was born in 1656 in Utrecht. According to Houbraken he was the son of the Amsterdam chemist Johann Rudolph Glauber (1604–1670), after whose death he left home at 15 to travel with his brother Johannes Glauber and the two brothers Van Doren by boat to Paris in 1671, where they stayed together for a year. When his brother Johannes departed for Lyon, young Jan Gotlieb became a pupil of the Haarlem painter Jacob Knijff and stayed painting for him until Knijff left Paris on a commission, whereupon Jan Gotlieb joined his brother in Lyon. Together they then travelled to Italy with two French painters. After 6 months in Rome he joined the Bentvueghels with the nickname Mirtillus.

After 2 years in Rome the brothers set off for Padua with the Flemish painter Robbert Duval, where they stayed a year. After that they travelled to Venice, where they stayed two years, attending the funeral of their friend Karel Dujardin. They finally left Italy in 1679 and went north to Hamburg, where they lived until 1684 when Jan Gotlieb went into the service of a German prince. From there he traveled to Vienna and from there to Wrocław, where he died in 1703.

According to the Netherlands Institute for Art History Jan Gotlieb Glauber was born in Utrecht as the younger brother of the painter Diana Glauber, accompanied his brother on all his travels, but left Hamburg in 1685 for Vienna.
