= Theodor van der Schuer =

Dutch Golden Age painter

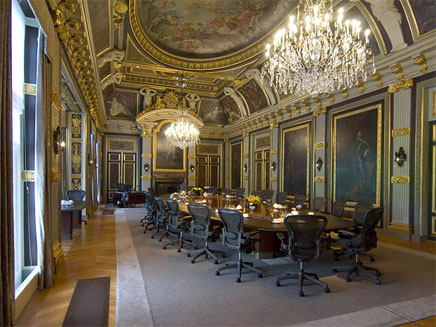
Trêveszaal with ceiling by Theodor van der Schuer

Theodor van der Schuer (1634–1707) was a Dutch Golden Age painter.

== Biography ==
Van der Schuer was born and died in The Hague. According to Houbraken he travelled to Italy where he joined the Bentvueghels with the nickname "Vrientschap", or friendship. He was one of the 48 signers of the founding charter of the Confrerie Pictura in the Hague, and painted one of the four corner pieces of the ceiling of the "Boterwaag" where the guild members met. The other corners were painted by Daniel Mijtens the Younger, Augustinus Terwesten, and Robbert Duval. Around 1705, he painted the ceiling of the entrance hall of the Maastricht Town Hall, as well as two allegorical chimney pieces for the same building.

According to the RKD he was a pupil of Sébastien Bourdon and on his return from Rome became court painter in the Hague. His pupils were Richard van Bleeck, Jan Hendrik Brandon, Cornelis de Bruyn, François Mannes, Hendrick Nieulant, Abraham Oosthoorn, and Cornelis van der Salm.
