= Johannes Glauber =

Dutch painter (1646–1726)

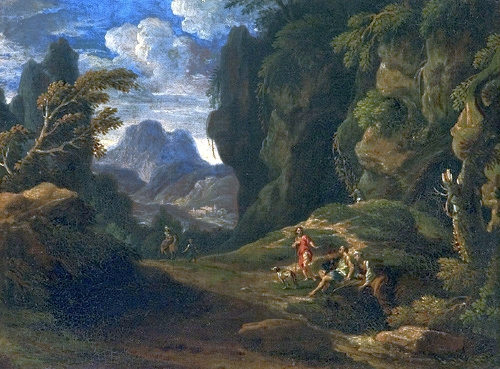
Rocky landscape with vagrants, Wilanów Palace, Warsaw

Johannes Glauber (1646, Utrecht (city) – c. 1726, Schoonhoven), was a Dutch Golden Age painter.

== Biography ==
According to Houbraken he became a painter against the wishes of his father, the chemist Johann Rudolph Glauber (1604–1670), and became a pupil of Nicolaes Berchem on his own, living with Gerrit van Uylenburgh and working on copies of Italianate landscapes for a growing market of connoisseurs in Amsterdam. After the death of his father, he travelled with his brother Johannes Gottlieb Glauber and the two brothers Van Doren by boat to Paris, where he stayed a year painting for Mr. Picart, an art dealer on the Pont Neuf who was a flower painter from the Low Countries. Then he travelled to Lyon, where he stayed for two years painting for Adriaen van der Kabel. He then travelled to Italy with his brother and two French painters. After 6 months in Rome he joined the Bentvueghels with the nickname Coridon, but since he knew that name had already been given to Van der Cabel, they changed it to Polidoor (after the landscape painter Polidoro da Caravaggio). He was friends with Karel Dujardin in Rome, who didn't want to join the Bentvueghels, but who received the somewhat negative nickname Bokkebaard (goatee) anyway. According to Houbraken another painter who didn't want to become a member after receiving an invitation received the epithet Platluizenbaard or lice-beard.

After 2 years in Rome he set off for Padua with his brother and the Flemish painter Robbert Duval, where they stayed a year. After that they travelled to Venice, where they stayed two years. They finally left Italy in 1679 and went north to Hamburg, where they lived until 1684 except for a short stay in Copenhagen when Johannes went to work for Ulrik Frederik Gyldenløve, Count of Laurvig on decorations fot Charlottenborg Palace.

After 1684 Johannes left his brother to return to Amsterdam, where he lived with Gerard de Lairesse and made wall decorations for various large homes and estates, including Soestdijk Palace, where he was assisted by Albert Meijeringh and Dirk Maas. Houbraken also mentions the house of Jacob de Flines on Herengracht 132, which Glauber helped decorate along with De Lairesse and Frederick de Moucheron. That house burned in 2008, but the wall paintings had been removed in 1910 and are located today in Beeckestijn. A ceiling decoration that Glauber made for Herengracht 446, Huis van der Graeff (home of Andries de Graeff) was sold at auction in 1903 and is installed today at the Peace Palace in the Hague. Houbraken also mentioned decorations for gentlemen in Rotterdam 'in the style of De Lairesse'. Glauber married the sister of the architect Steven Vennecool and at the time Houbraken was writing, he lived in the Proveniershuis in Schoonhoven.

According to the RKD Glauber was the brother of the painter Diana Glauber and settled in the Hague, where he became a member of the Confrerie Pictura in 1687. He was the teacher of the painter Willem Troost.
