= Johan Graham =

Dutch painter

Johan Graham (1705-1775) was an 18th-century painter from London active in The Hague and Amsterdam.

== Biography ==
According to the RKD (the Netherlands Institute for Art History), he was born in London but lived mostly in the Hague, where he was active at a young age. He travelled to Rome and returned to London but came back to The Hague and was still living there in 1750. He became a member of the Confrerie Pictura in 1742, and was registered as a pupil of Arnold Houbraken, Jacques Ignatius de Roore and Mattheus Terwesten. Houbraken died in 1718, so he can't have studied with him very long, and in 1719 he travelled to Italy, visiting Bologna, Venice, and Rome. He taught English lessons on the side and is known for wall & ceiling decorations. In 1775 he sold his collection of 136 paintings and moved with his elderly sister to London, where he died that year.
