= Frans Beeldemaker =

Dutch Golden Age painter

Francois, or Frans Beeldemaker (18 January 1659, Dordrecht – 27 April 1728, Rotterdam), was a Dutch Golden Age painter.

== Biography ==
According to Houbraken he was a painter from the Hague who travelled to Rome and joined the Bentvueghels who awarded him the derogatory nickname "Aap" (Ape).

According to Jan van Gool, who continued Houbraken's work after his death, he was the son of Johannes Beeldemaker, a painter who specialized in painting scenes of deer and boar hunts. He was the younger brother of Cornelis Beeldemaker and became a pupil of Willem Doudijns. He travelled to Rome and became a member of the Bentvueghels, but he was so unfriendly that an argument broke out among the bent members what to call him as nickname, and when someone cried out "Why are we arguing over such an ape?", the tempers were calmed by the idea of calling him "Aap" or ape. Later, after his return to the Hague, he became popular as an interior painter and made several notable decorations. He joined the Confrerie Pictura but was not popular there and everyone could understand why he had been given the name of ape. He later lost customers to Augustinus Terwesten who returned from Rome in 1677 and who painted interiors in a similar style, but qualitatively better.

According to the RKD his bentname was Aap and he was taught by his father Adriaen Cornelisz Beeldemaker (also known as Johannes), Doudijns, and Augustinus Terwesten. He was the grandfather of the painter François Beeldemaker II, and joined the guild in 1687.
