= Diana Glauber =

Dutch golden age artist (1650– c. 1721)

- Born: 11 January 1650; Utrecht, Dutch Republic
- Died: c. 1721; Hamburg, Holy Roman Empire
- Occupation: painter
- Relatives: Johann Rudolph Glauber (father); Johannes Gottlieb Glauber (brother); Johannes Glauber (brother)

Diana Glauber (11 January 1650, Utrecht – c. 1721, Hamburg), was a Dutch Golden Age painter.

== Biography ==
Born on 11 January 1650, Diana Glauber was a Dutch painter. According to Houbraken she was the daughter of the Amsterdam chemist Johann Rudolph Glauber, and the sister of the painters Jan Gotlief and Johannes Glauber. She was good with portraits and historical allegories, but lost her sight and stopped painting. She was still living in Hamburg while Houbraken was writing.

According to the RKD no works are known, but 6 works are described in a period inventory of the Schloss Salzdahlum, of which five form a series of the five senses. (Note: Her birthdate was given as 11 January 1650. She died c. 1721. Unknown 1650 as her birthdate.)
