= Pieter van der Hulst (IV) =

Dutch painter

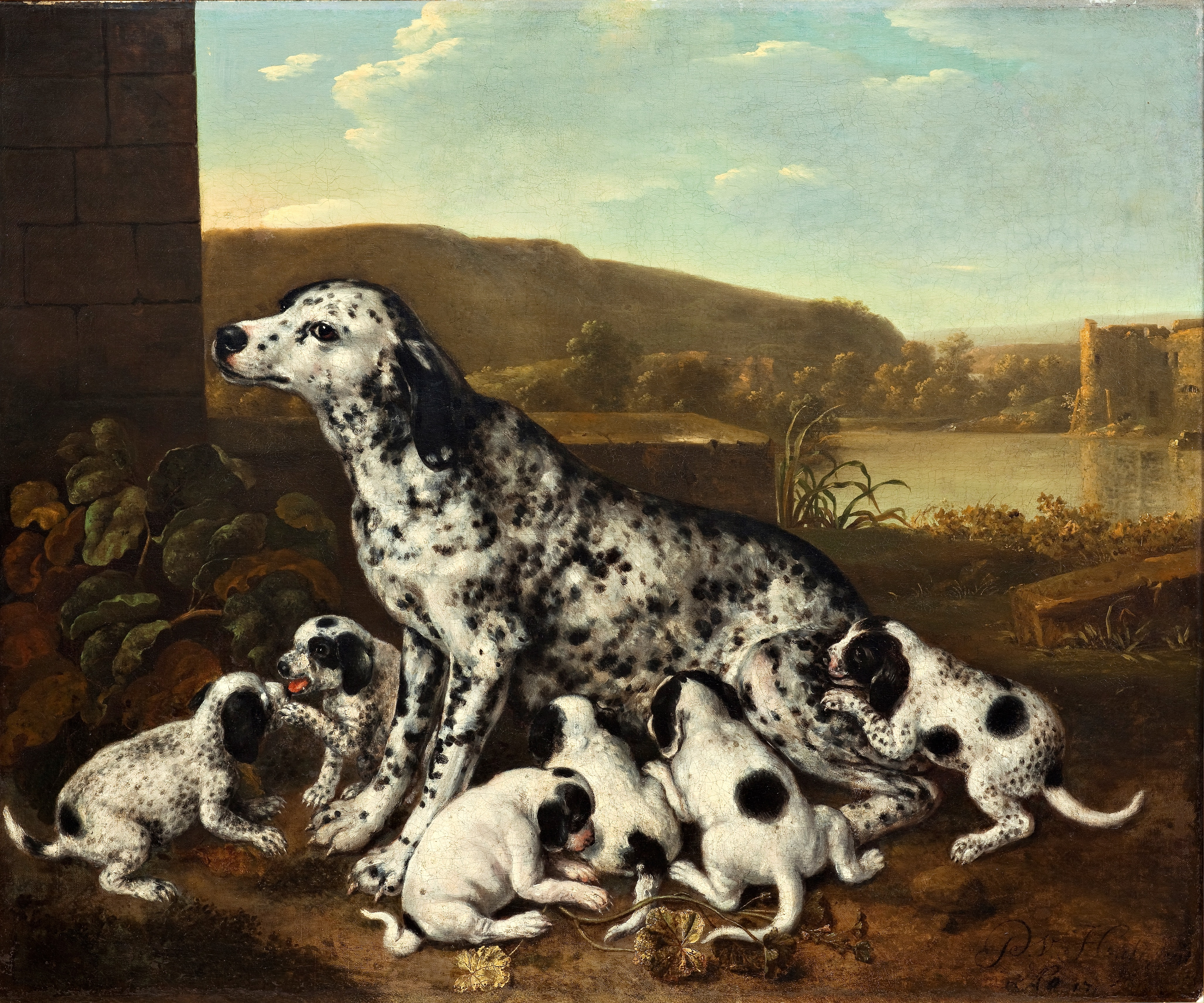
Dalmatian dog with puppies

Pieter van der Hulst (26 February 1651, Dordrecht – 14 February 1727, Dordrecht), was a Dutch painter of portraits, still lifes, forest still life, game pieces and animal paintings.

== Biography ==
Born in Dortrecht, he studied in The Hague as a pupil of Willem Doudijns in 1668. He travelled to Rome, possibly together with Cornelis de Bruyn. There he stayed from 1674 to 1677, concentrating on painting flowers. He would also join the Bentvueghels, an association of mainly Dutch and Flemish artists working in Rome. It was customary for the Bentvueghels to adopt an appealing nickname, the so-called 'bent name'. He was given the bent name "Zonnebloem" for his preference for a "sort of flower that was wilder" than those depicted by Jan Davidsz de Heem or Daniel Seghers.

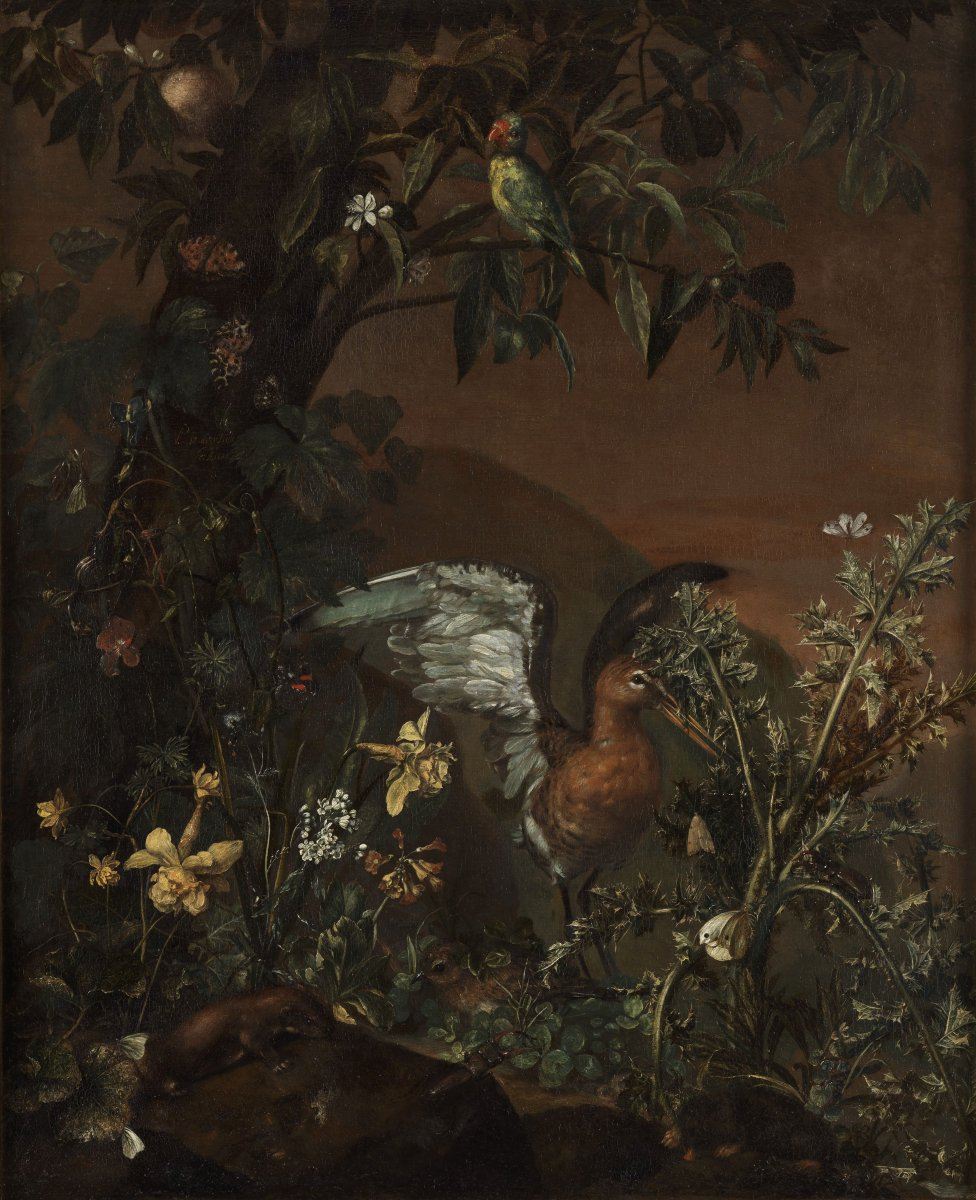
Undergrowth

He returned to Holland where he is registered in the Hague from 1681 to 1683 and joined the local Guild of Saint Luke. He resided in Dordrecht from 1684 to 1691. From 1691 to 1699 he was in Denmark as a court painter to the king. He later returned to Dordrecht.

== Works ==
He painted portraits, still lifes, forest still life, game pieces and animal paintings. He decorated his flower paintings with wild herbs, snakes, toads, salamanders, and that sort of thing. Later he tried his hand at painting portraits, but these were nowhere near as popular as his earlier work.
