= Ezaias Terwesten =

Dutch painter

- Born: 1661; The Hague, Dutch Republic
- Died: 1724 (aged 62–63); Rome, Papal States
- Known for: Painting
- Notable work: Allegory of the Arts
- Movement: Baroque

Ezaias Terwesten (1661–1724) was an 18th-century painter from the Dutch Republic.

== Biography ==
Terwesten was born in The Hague. According to Houbraken he was two years younger than his brother Augustinus Terwesten who was his first teacher, along with his brother Mattheus. He travelled to Rome, joined the Bentvueghels, and received the bent "Paradysvogel" (Bird of Paradise).

As well as Paradysvogel, he was also known by the pseudonym "Den Brander", and signed his Christian name Esayas, not Ezaias. He is often confused with a brother of the same name who was born 10 years before Terwesten's birth and who died early. He travelled to Rome in 1694, got married, and remained there for the rest of his life.
