= Albert Meijeringh =

Dutch Golden Age landscape painter

Albert Meijeringh (1645, Amsterdam – July 17, 1714, Amsterdam), was a Dutch Golden Age landscape painter.

== Biography ==
According to the RKD he was friends with Johannes Glauber and was in Italy from 1672 to 1683. He is known for painting Italianate landscapes.

According to Houbraken he learned to paint from his father Frederik together with his brother Hendrik, who painted and sold room dividers (kamerschermen) in Amsterdam. He travelled through France and Italy, sometimes in the company of Johannes Glauber and his brother, and was gone for 10 years before he returned to Amsterdam. He specialized in large wall decorations with landscape views of garden houses ore Belvederes, with shade trees reflected on water.

Together with Glauber, he decorated the dining room of Soestdijk Palace for Mary II of England in the 1680s.
