= Adriaen Cornelisz Beeldemaker =

Dutch Golden Age painter

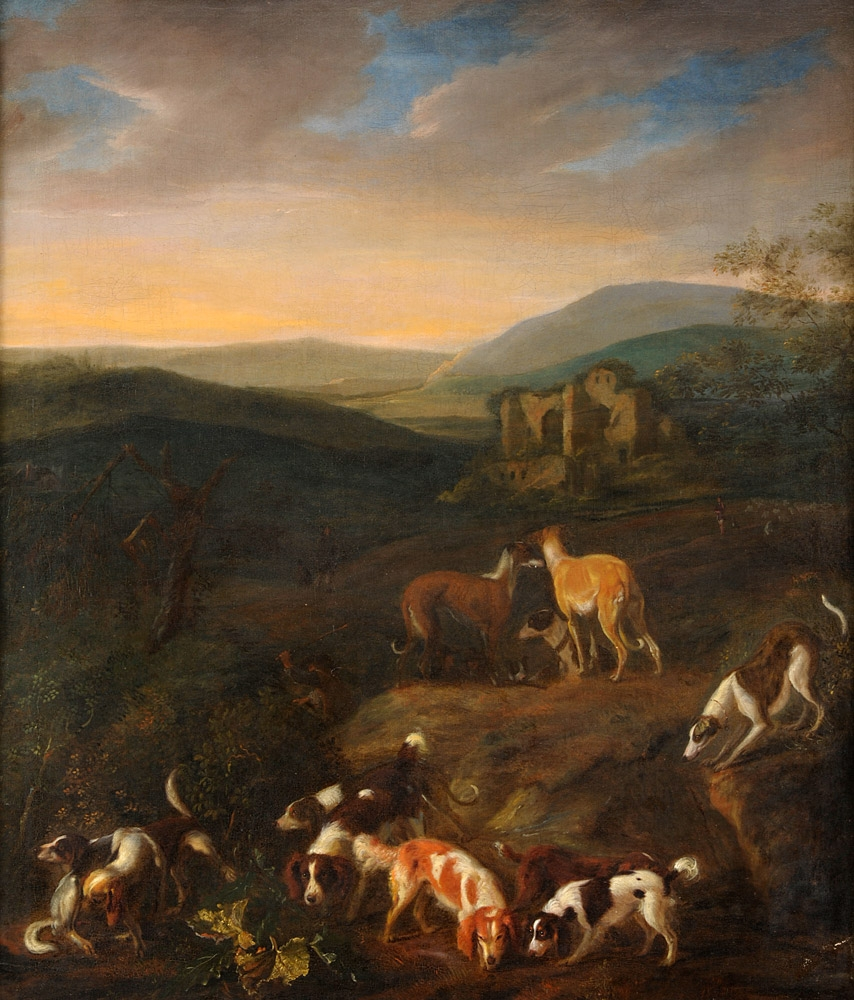
Pack of dogs, 1660

Adriaen Cornelisz. Beeldemaker (1618, Rotterdam – 1709, The Hague), was a Dutch Golden Age painter.

== Biography ==
According to Jan van Gool he specialized in painting scenes of deer and boar hunts. His paintings were popular, probably because he asked modest prices for them. He had many pupils and many children; two of his sons later became painters.

He was also known as Johannes, and became the father of the painters Cornelis and Frans Beeldemaker. He worked in Leiden and Dordrecht.

Examples of his work are represented at Kadriorg Palace, (part of the Art Museum of Estonia) in Tallinn, Estonia.
