= Mattheus Terwesten =

Dutch painter

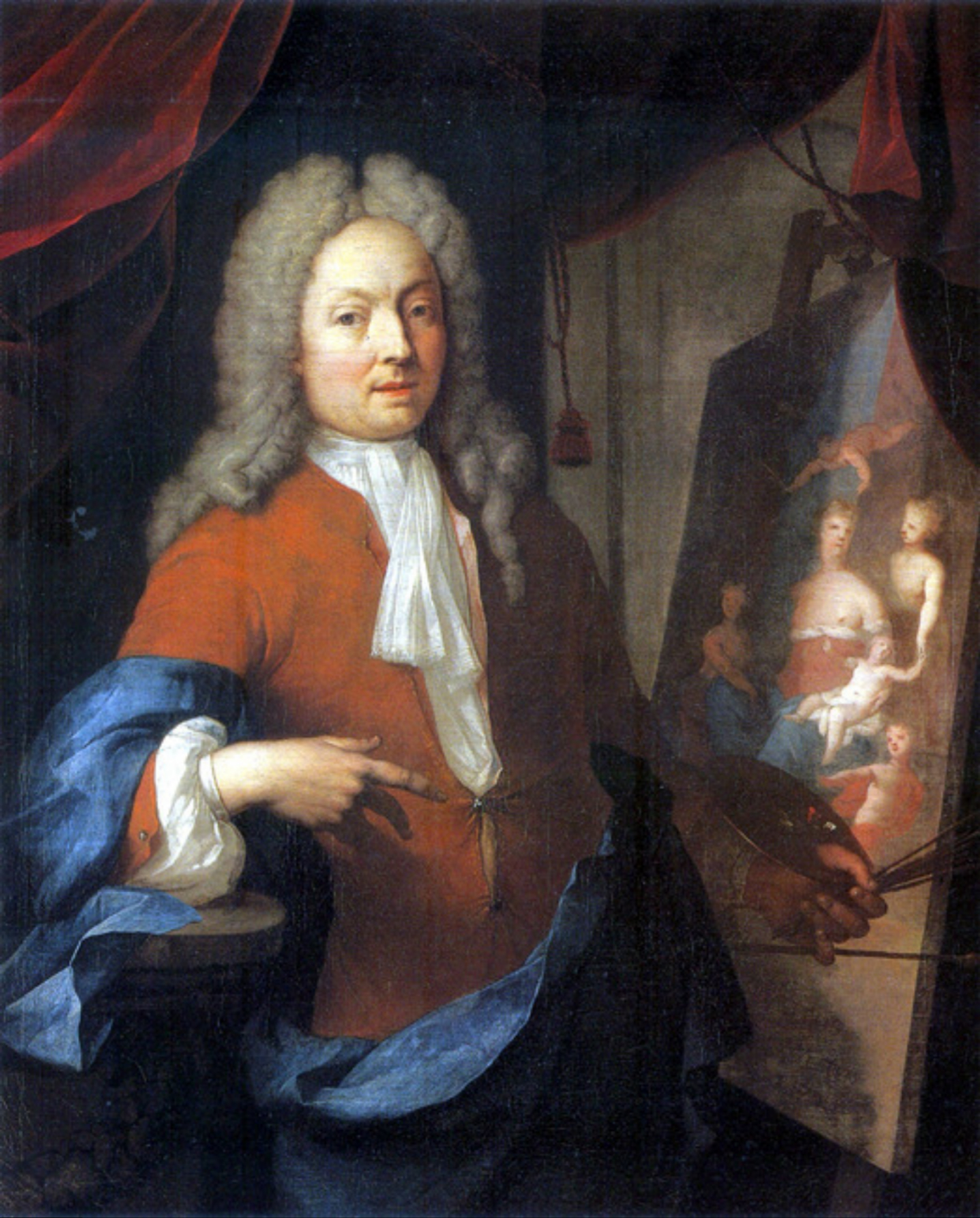
- Self-portrait, c. 1705
- Born: 23 February 1670, the Hague
- Died: 11 June 1757, Berlin
- Known for: Painting, engraving

Mattheus Terwesten or Matthäus Terwesten (23 February 1670 – 11 June 1757) was a Dutch painter and art educator. He is known for his portraits as well as of mythological and allegorical subjects. He was a decorative painter he painted chimney pieces, overdoors, wall hangings and ceilings for the luxurious buildings of his time. He was director of The Hague Drawing Academy. He became court painter to Frederick William I of Prussia and professor at the Prussian Academy of Arts.

== Life ==
Terwesten was born in The Hague of parents of German origin. His father, Hans Jacob Terwesten or Zurwesten, was originally from Augsburg while his mother Catharina came from Berlin. They had married in The Hague in 1648, where Hans Jacob worked as a goldsmith. The marriage produced ten children, of whom three sons and two daughters survived. Augustinus was the oldest son. In his father's workshop Augustinus learned the art of engraving, goldsmithing and wax modelling. This was followed by two years of apprenticeship with the history painter Nicolaes Willingh, who became court painter to the Great Elector in Berlin in 1667. Ezaias, the middle son of the family, also worked temporarily in his father's workshop and settled later in Rome as a flower and fruit painter.

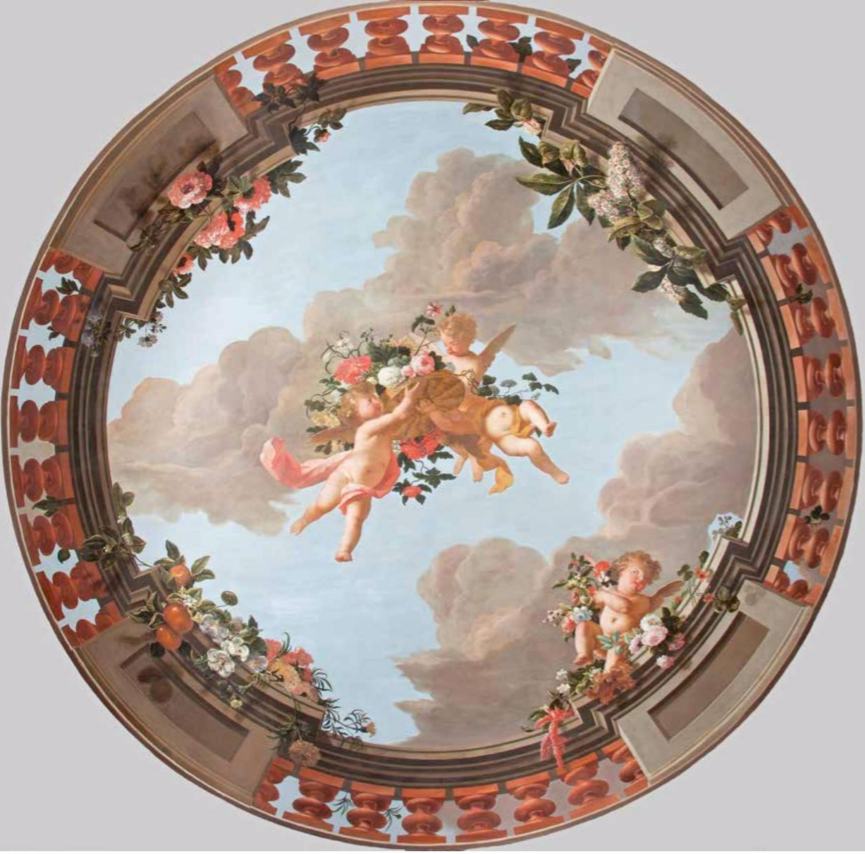
Ceiling painting with putti and flowers, collaboration with Gaspar Peeter Verbruggen the Younger

He initially studied under his 21 years older brother Augustin. He further received training from Willem Doudyns and Daniel Mijtens the Younger. When Augustin moved to Berlin in 1690, he finished several of the works left unfinished by his brother. He also received his own commissions.

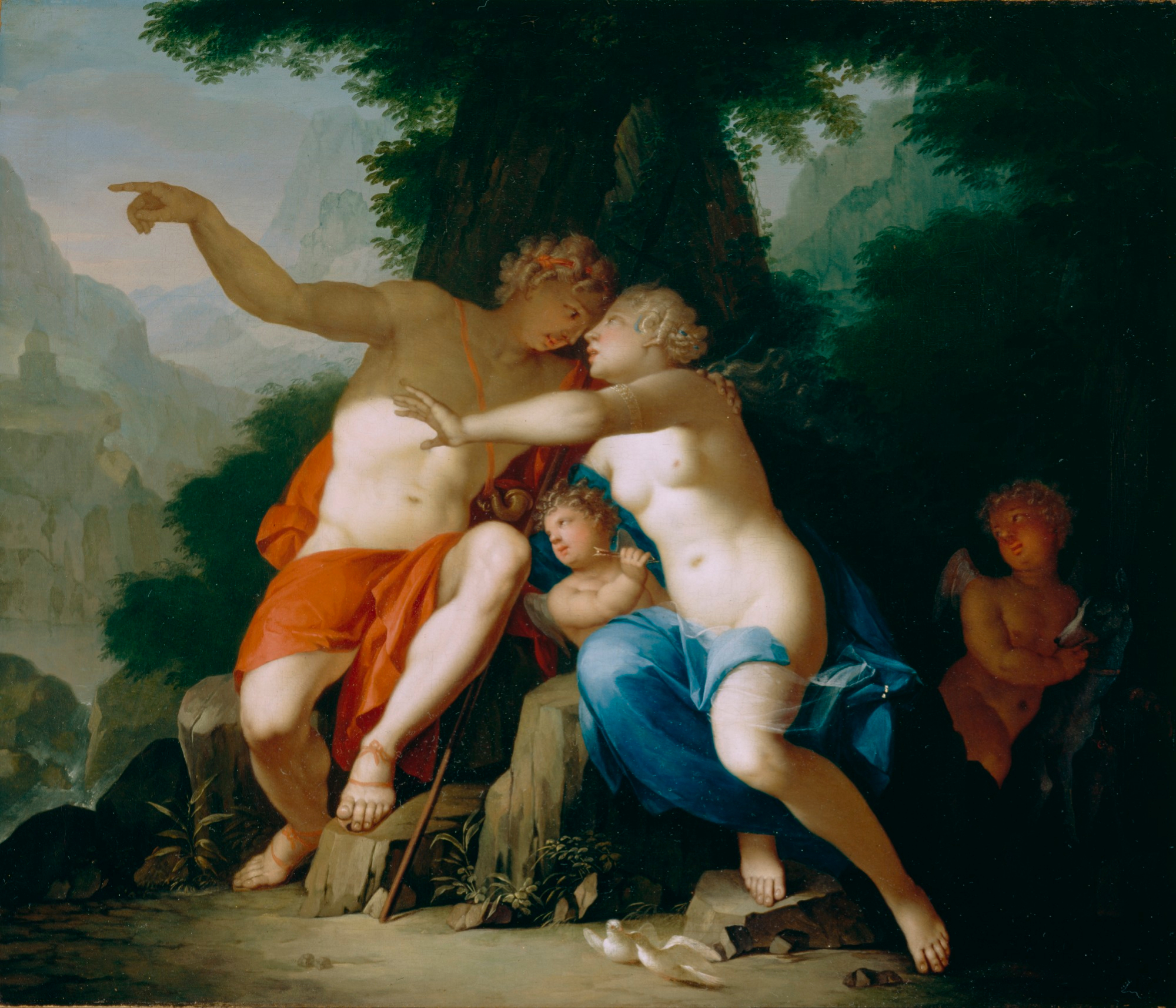
Venus and Adonis

In 1695 he traveled via Berlin to Rome, where his mother and brother Augustinus were living. He took drawing classes at the Academy of Arts in Berlin for which he received a certificate. In the spring of 1696 he travelled via Leipzig and Neurenberg to Augsburg where to his regret no family members were still living. He then continued on to Florence and Siena to arrive in Rome. Here he produced in 1697 an extensive album of drawings after Antique models. In Rome he became a member of the Bentvueghels, an association of mainly Dutch and Flemish artists working in Rome. It was customary for new members of the Bentvueghels to adopt an appealing nickname, the so-called 'bent name'. Terwesten took the nickname "Arend", "Arents" or "Aquila", meaning "eagle".

He travelled to Berlin to visit his sick mother. He passed via Loreto, Bologna, Venice and Vienna. He stayed one month in Venice and met the Flemish painter Anthoni Schoonjans during his three-month stay in Vienna. He then continued on via Prague to Berlin where he resided in the years 1698/99. In June 1699 he was back in The Hague, where he worked on commissions from important public figures. He was recorded back in Berlin in April 1710 where his brothers Ezaias and Augustinus were active. When the latter died in 1711, he succeeded him as court painter in Berlin, while Ezaias went to Italy, where he married and settled permanently. He also became professor at the Academy of Berlin. He returned to The Hague in 1710. He married that same year Thedora van Rheenen with whom he had five children. Two of them—Augustinus the Younger and Pieter—also became painters.

His pupils were Herman Diederik Cuipers, Pieter van Cuyck (I), Jan van Gool, Johan Graham, Hendrik van Hulst, Jacob van Nachenius, Andries Storck, as well as his two sons Augustinus the Younger and Pieter.

He was active in the drawing academy of The Hague throughout his professional life. He worked until old age. As late as 1751, at the age of 81, he was commissioned to decorate a courtroom and executed it. After two strokes he died in The Hague on 11 June 1757.

== Work ==
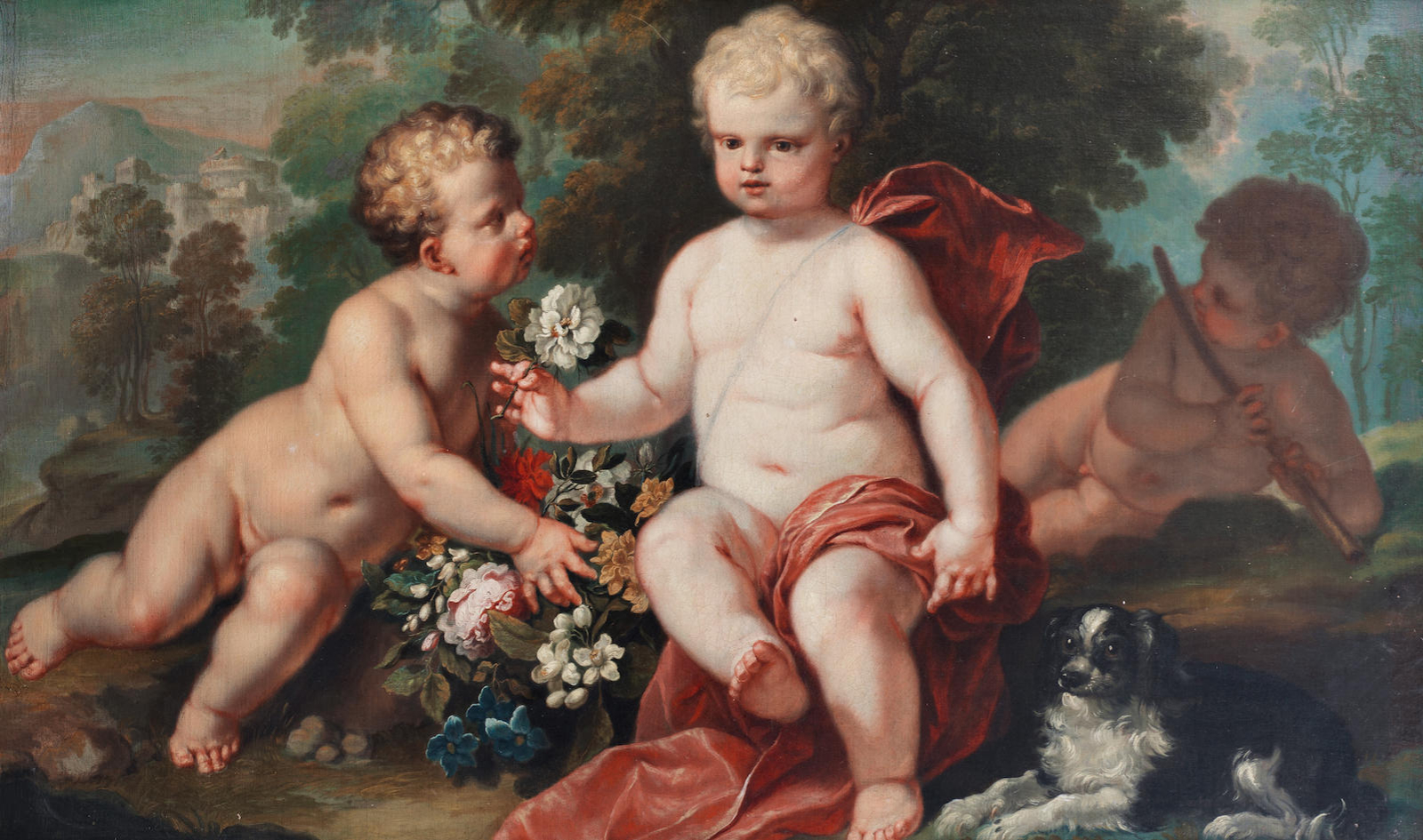
Cherubs and a spaniel before a landscape, collaboration with Pieter Hardimé

He painted portraits and wall and ceiling decorations with historical allegories.

He collaborated with his brothers and specialist still life painters on his decorative paintings. The Flemish still life painters Pieter Hardimé and Gaspar Peeter Verbruggen the Younger who both worked in the Dutch Republic during their careers are among his known collaborators. These collaborations were usually on decorative ceiling paintings, as well as chimney pieces and overdoors. When one of the flower painters was without a commission, Terwesten would occasionally paint a simple background motif such as a vase with drapery or playing putti and the specialist would add the flowers and have the finished painting offered for sale. Such a work was signed, if at all, by the flower painter.
