= Johannes Mytens =

Dutch Golden Age painter (c.1614 – 1670)

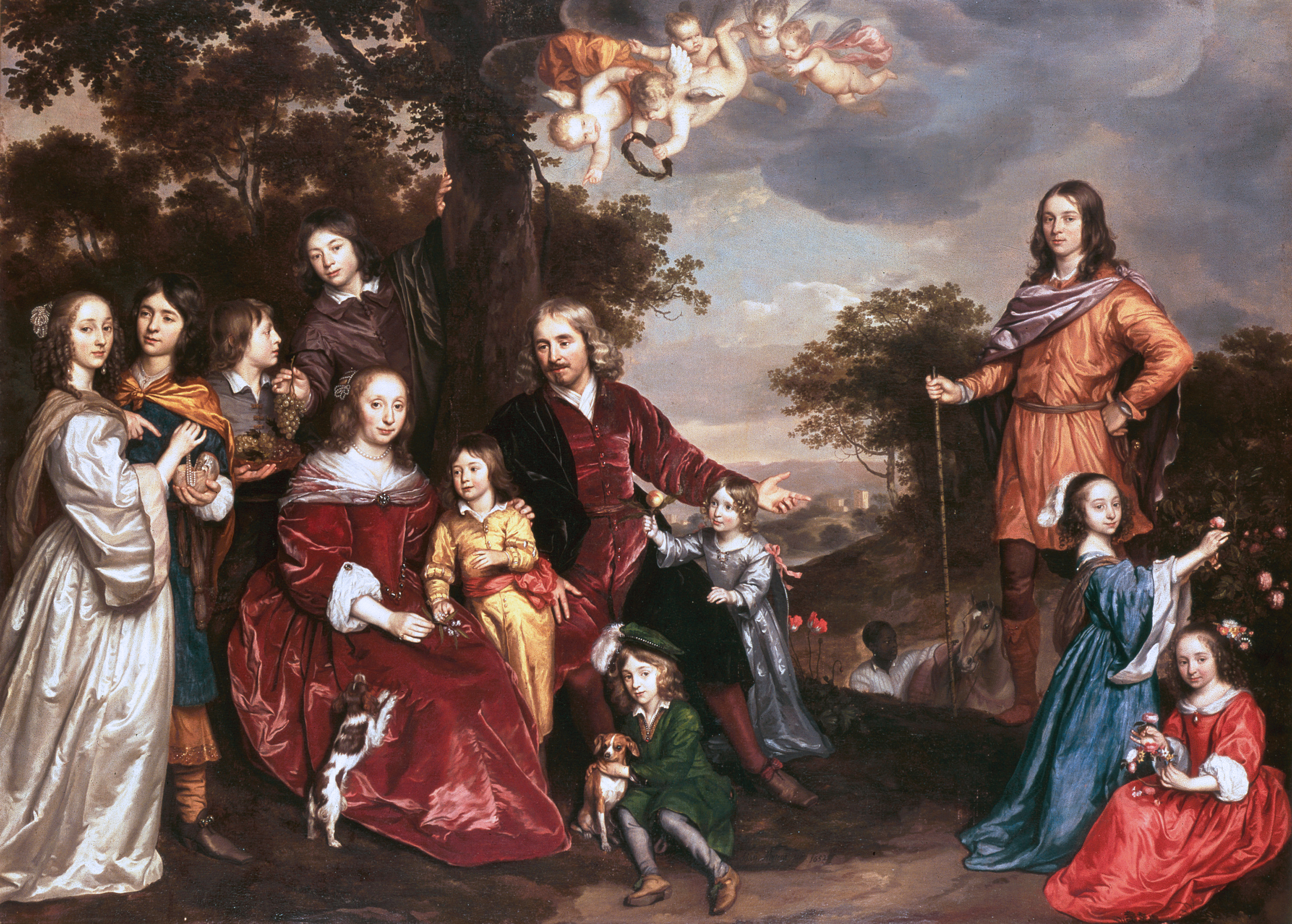
The family of Mr. Willem van den Kerckhoven (1607–1686) and Reijmerick de Jonge, by Jan Mijtens (c. 1652–1655)

Johannes Mytens or Jan Mijtens, or "Mytens" to the English (c. 1614 – 24 December 1670) was a Dutch Golden Age painter, almost entirely as a portraitist.

Mytens was born in The Hague. According to Houbraken, Johannes (Jan) Mijtens was trained by Anthony van Opstal and later by Nicolas van der Horst. Both of his uncles, Isaac Mijtens and Daniël Mijtens, were painters, and his son Cornelis became an engraver. This statement has often been repeated by various art historians, but Houbraken mixed up his notes on this artist with his notes on Jan Meyssens, the engraver. This Jan Mytens did not have a son Cornelis who was a good engraver. That was Jan Meyssens (and the Meyssens lived in Antwerp, not the Hague).

Mytens became a member of The Hague Guild of Saint Luke in 1642 and helped set up the Confrerie Pictura. He painted for Dutch royalty and specialized in portraiture, genre pieces, and historical allegories. Mytens was especially skilled at rendering the clothing of affluent Dutch. According to the RKD, his students were Nicolaes Lissant, Gerard de Nijst, Adriaen Stalpert van der Wiele, Pouwels van de Velde, Andries Thijsz. de Wit, and Urbanus Talibert van Yperen. He died in The Hague.

In his 1652 painting of the family of Mr. Willem van den Kerckhoven, the youngest son Pellegrom (leaning against his father's leg) was added later in 1655 (he was not yet born in 1652). The five angels depict other children who died in infancy.
