= Willem Doudijns =

Dutch Golden Age painter and engraver

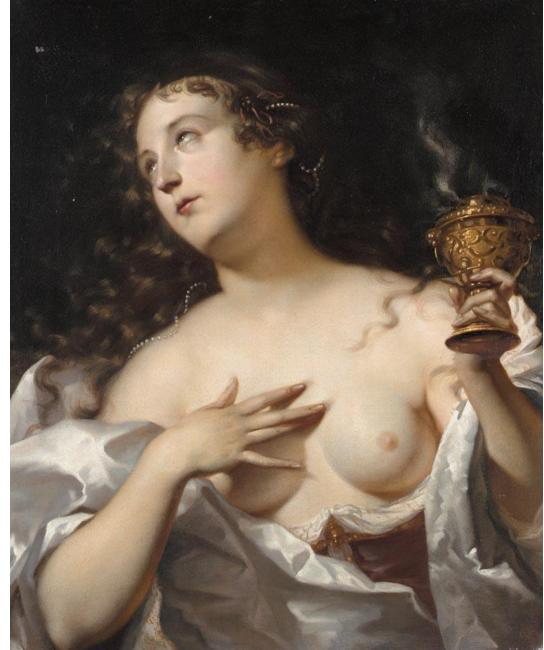
- 'A Vestal Virgin with a fuming incense burner .
- Born: Willem; 1630; The Hague
- Died: 1697 (aged 68–69); The Hague
- Known for: Painting, Engraving
- Movement: Baroque

Willem Doudijns (1630–1697), was a Dutch Golden Age painter and engraver.

== Biography ==
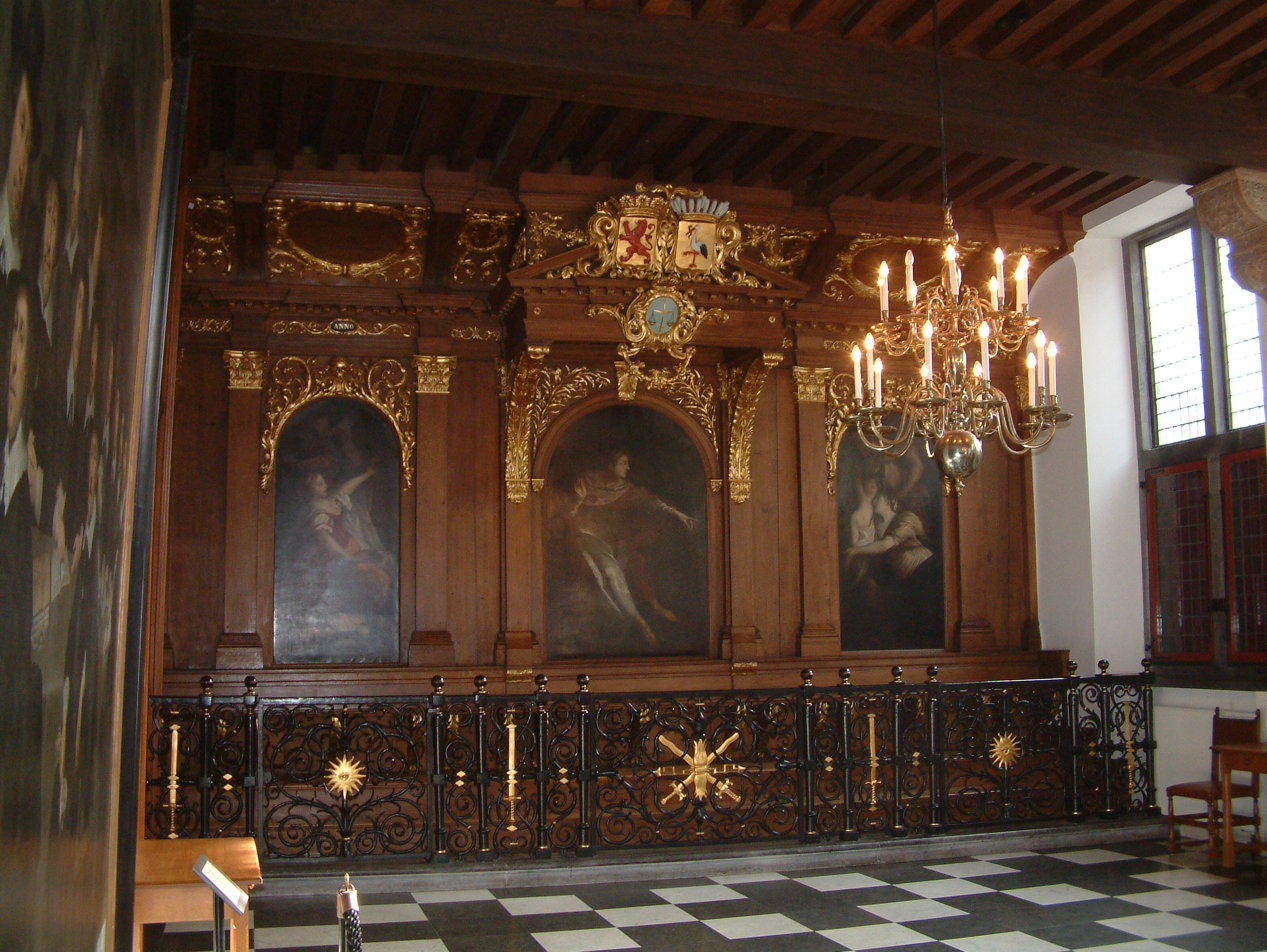
Vierschaar with three paintings depicting the judgement of Salomon in The Hague city hall, by Doudijns

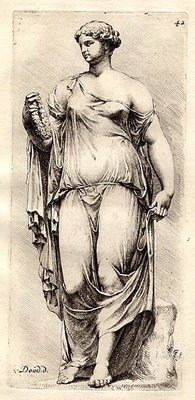
Roman sculpture seen from the front, drawn by Doudijns, and engraved by Jan de Bisschop.

According to the RKD he learned to draw from Alexander le Petit, and he spent 12 years in Italy. He returned home in 1661, where he collaborated with Jan de Bisschop on engravings. Both he and Bisschop were founding members of the Confrerie Pictura and Doudijns painted a large ceiling painting for the meeting hall that has not survived. His pupil Mattheus Terwesten made a sketch of this Allegory of the artists leaving the Hague Guild of St. Luke which is now in the Rijksmuseum print cabinet.

According to Houbraken he was the son of a mayor, and in Rome he joined the Bentvueghels with the nickname Diomedes. On his return became the head of the Confrerie Pictura. He was known for his wall and ceiling paintings, most notably the Judgment of Solomon in the Vierschaar, or courtroom, of the Hague city hall.

His pupils were Erasmus Arondeus, Frans Beeldemaker, Gijsbert de Bije, Bartholomeus van Burgindis, Arnoldus Gouda, Nicolaes Hooft, Pieter van der Hulst, Daniël Jacobsz., Lowys Paen, Nicolaes van Ravesteyn, Pieter van Reenen, Pieter Jansz van Ruyven, Augustinus Terwesten, Mattheus Terwesten, Michiel van der Valck, Daniël Walewijns, Domenicus van Wijnen, and Willem Wissing.
