= Robbert Duval =

Dutch painter

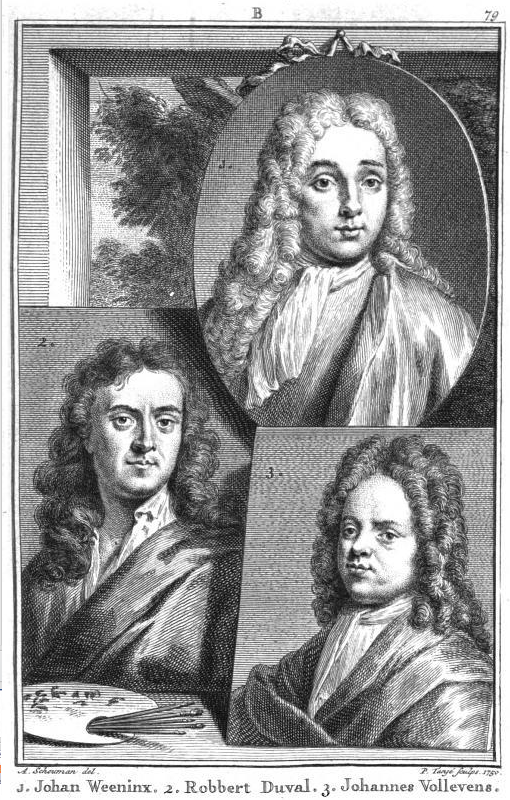
Portrait of Robbert Duval (lower left) in Jan van Gool's "Nieuw Schouburg", 1750

Robbert Duval (21 September 1639 – 22 January 1732) was a Dutch Golden Age painter who lived well into the 18th century. He was born and died in The Hague.

== Biography ==
According to the RKD he learned to paint from Nicolaes Willingh and became his assistant in Berlin in 1667. He left Berlin to make a trip to Rome in 1668, where he joined the Bentvueghels with the nickname Fortuyn. He is known for painting portrait and historical allegories, of which none survive today.

According to Houbraken he left Rome for Padua in 1677 with Johannes Glauber and his brother. He probably left Padua with them for Venice, where he stayed until 1681. In 1682 he returned to the Hague, where he helped set up the Royal Academy of Art (The Hague) with Willem Doudijns, Theodor van der Schuer, and Daniel Mijtens the Younger. In the same year he became court painter to William III of England and worked at Het Loo Palace and Hampton Court. He lived to a great age.
