= Karel Dujardin =

Dutch painter (1626–1678)

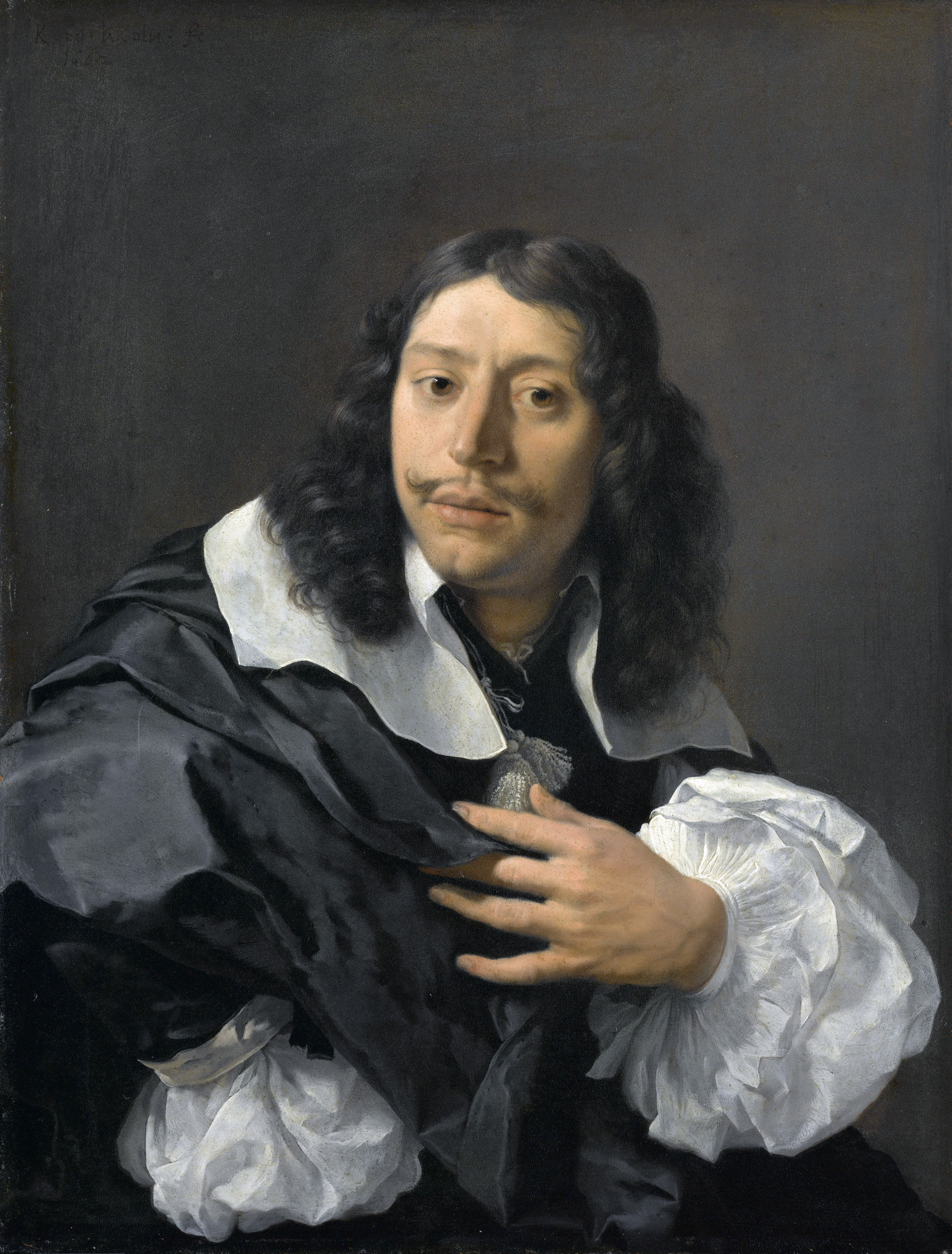
- Self-portrait, 1662
- Born: Karel Dujardin; 1626; Amsterdam
- Died: 1678 (aged 51–52); Venice
- Known for: Painting
- Movement: Dutch Golden Age painting

Karel Dujardin (September 27, 1626 – November 20, 1678) was a Dutch Golden Age painter. Although he did a few portraits and a few history paintings of religious subjects, most of his work is small Italianate landscape scenes with animals and peasants, and other genre scenes. Dujardin spent two extended periods, at the beginning and end of his career, in Italy, and most of his paintings and landscape etchings have an Italian or Italianate setting.

== Biography ==
Karel Dujardin was a Dutch painter and etcher, born in Amsterdam in 1626. Typical of his landscape paintings is Farm Animals in the Shade of a Tree (1656; National Gallery, London). He died in Venice in 1678.

After supposedly training with Nicolaes Berchem, the young Dujardin went to Italy, and joined the Bentvueghels group of painters in Rome, among whom he was known as "Barba di Becco", "goat-beard", or Bokkebaart. Here he encountered his first artistic successes.

According to Houbraken, while in Lyon in France, he contracted considerable debts, and married his (older) landlady to free himself of them. He went with her to Amsterdam, where his pictures were valued very highly. In 1675, he returned to Rome, on an invitation from his friend Joan Reynst and was welcomed by his old friends and admirers. Renst and Dujardin went on a Grand Tour to other Italian cities, but when Reynst went back to Amsterdam, Dujardin remained in Italy, and gave him a message for his wife that he would follow soon.

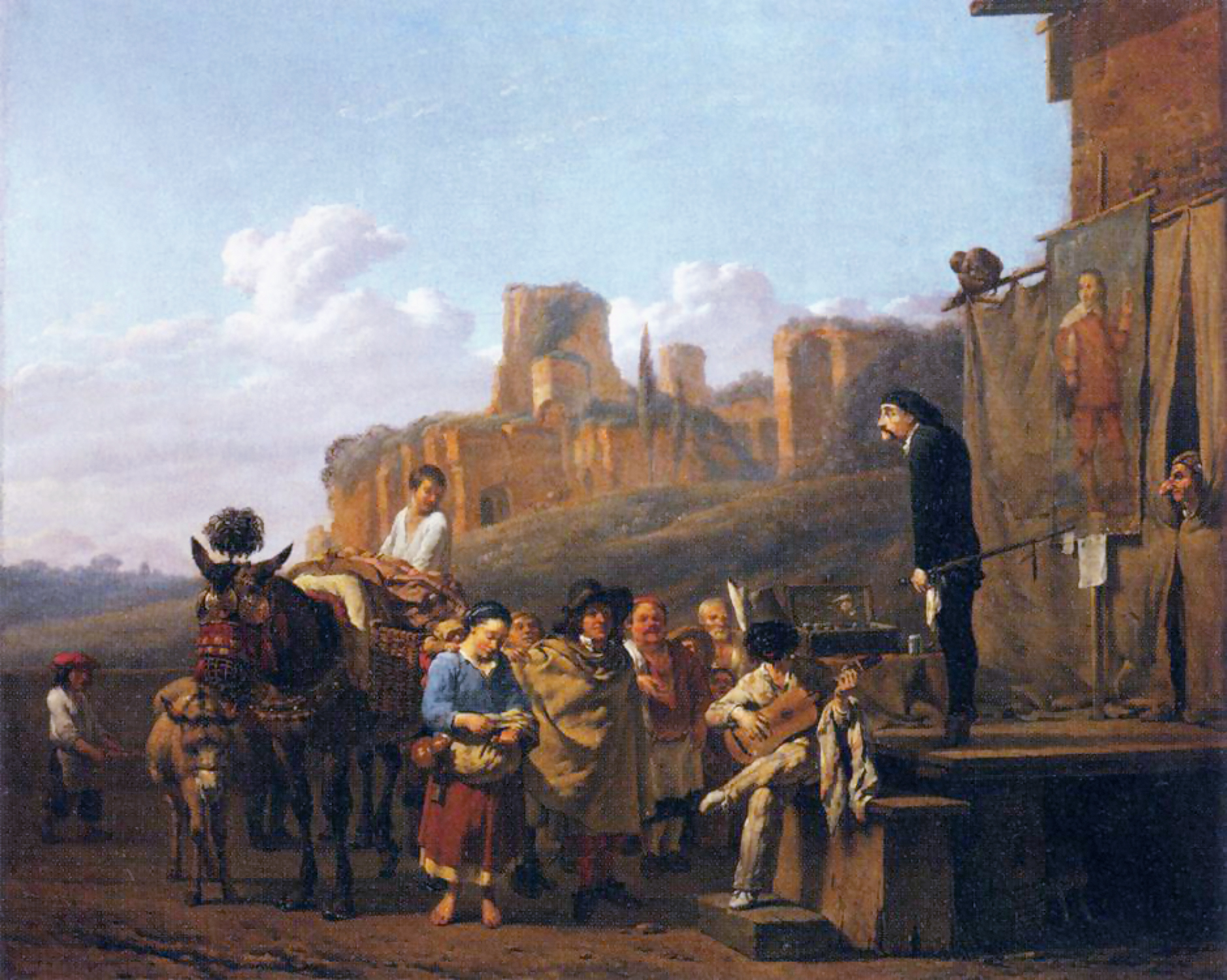
Karel Dujardin, Commedia dell'Arte Show, dated 1657 (Louvre)

He travelled on to Venice but died there unexpectedly in 1678. According to Reynst, he had said: "why should I be in a hurry to go back? I am where I want to be". According to his friend Johannes Glauber, who he had met previously in Rome, he was painting for a Dutch merchant in Venice when he suddenly became unwell. Though he seemed to recover, his stomach was too full and he died. Though he was a member of the Dutch Reformed Church, he was laid to rest in the Catholic manner (wrapped in a white shroud) and was carried to his grave by his friends Govert van der Leeuw and Glauber.

Among his pupils were Jacob II, son of Jacob van der Does, Martinus Laeckman, and Erick van den Weerelt.

== Collections ==
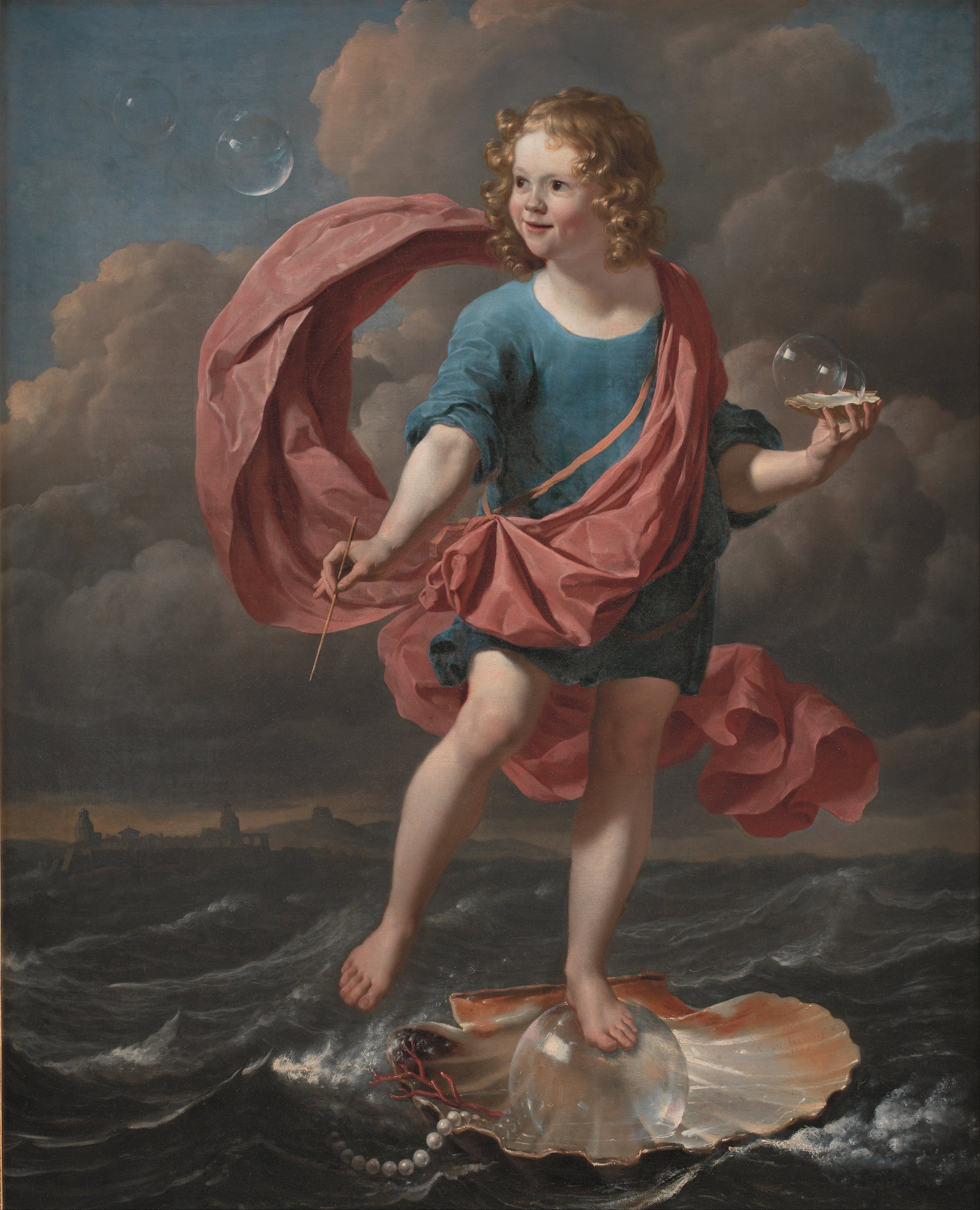
Boy Blowing Soap Bubbles. Allegory on the Transitoriness and the Brevity of Life

Dujardin is represented in the following collections amongst others: Detroit Institute of Arts, Michigan; Fine Arts Museums of San Francisco; Fitzwilliam Museum at the University of Cambridge, UK; Hermitage Museum, Saint Petersburg, Russia; Indianapolis Museum of Art, Indiana; J. Paul Getty Museum, Los Angeles; Louvre Museum, Paris; Mauritshuis Royal Picture Gallery, The Hague; Minneapolis Institute of Arts, Minnesota; National Gallery, London, UK; Norton Simon Museum, Pasadena, California; Rijksmuseum, Amsterdam; Art Gallery of Greater Victoria, British Columbia; Ashmolean Museum, Oxford, UK; Cleveland Museum of Art, Ohio; Crocker Art Museum, California; Dulwich Picture Gallery, London, UK; Harvard University Art Museums, Massachusetts; Hunterian Museum and Art Gallery, University of Glasgow, Scotland; Norton Museum of Art, West Palm Beach, Florida; Ringling Museum of Art, Florida; Royal Museums of Fine Arts of Belgium; Smart Museum of Art at the University of Chicago; Szépmûvészeti Múzeum, Budapest; The Wallace Collection, London, UK; Thyssen-Bornemisza Museum, Madrid; Rhode Island School of Design, RI; Beecroft Art Gallery, Southend-on-Sea.

== Work ==
Karel Dujardin's paintings

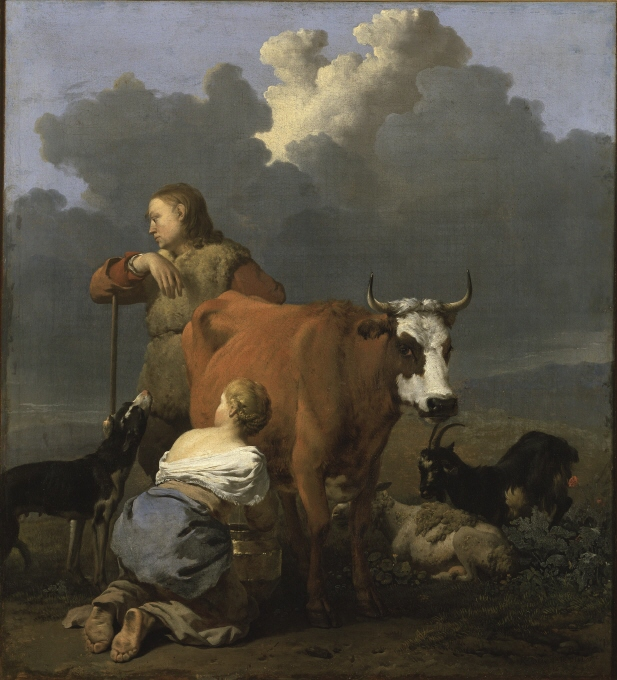
Woman Milking a Red Cow, oil on canvas.

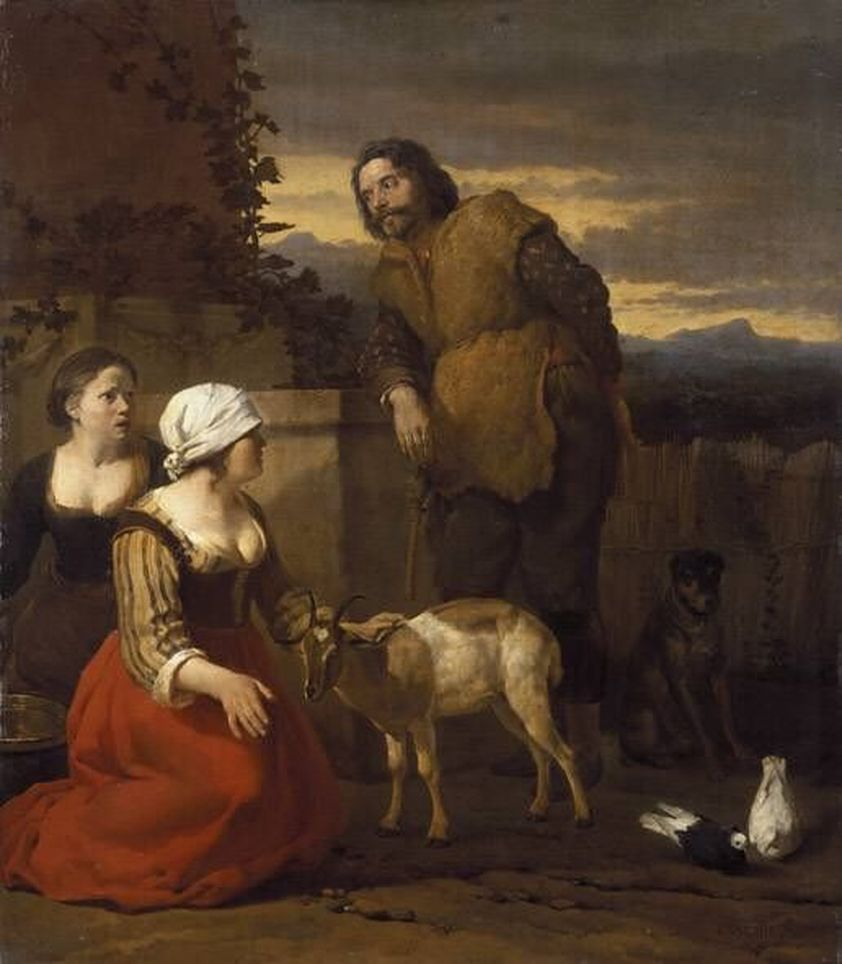
The sick kid

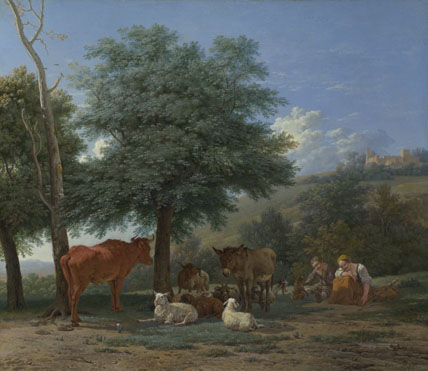
Farm Animals in the Shade of a Tree, 1656, London, National Gallery.

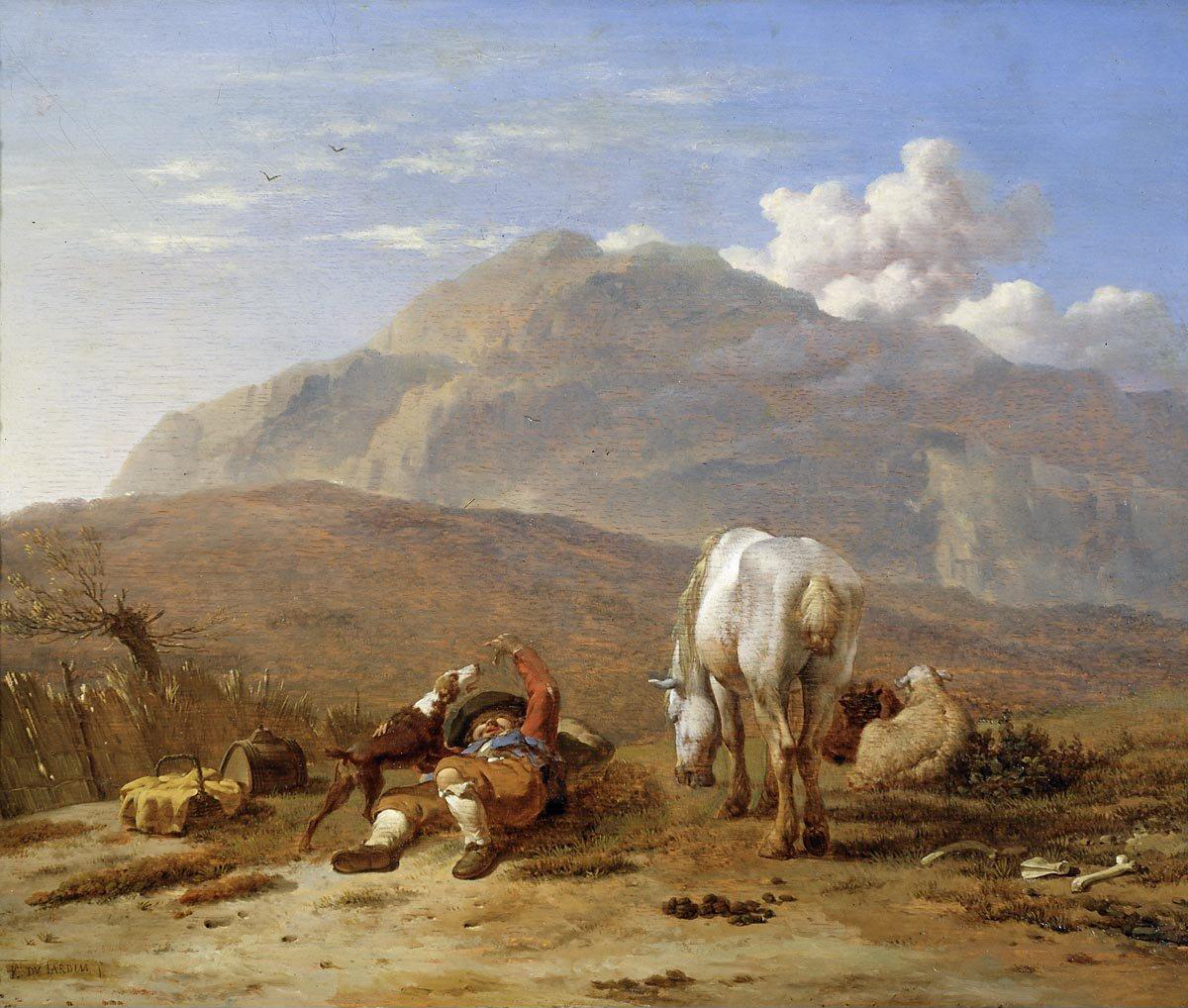
The Herding boy

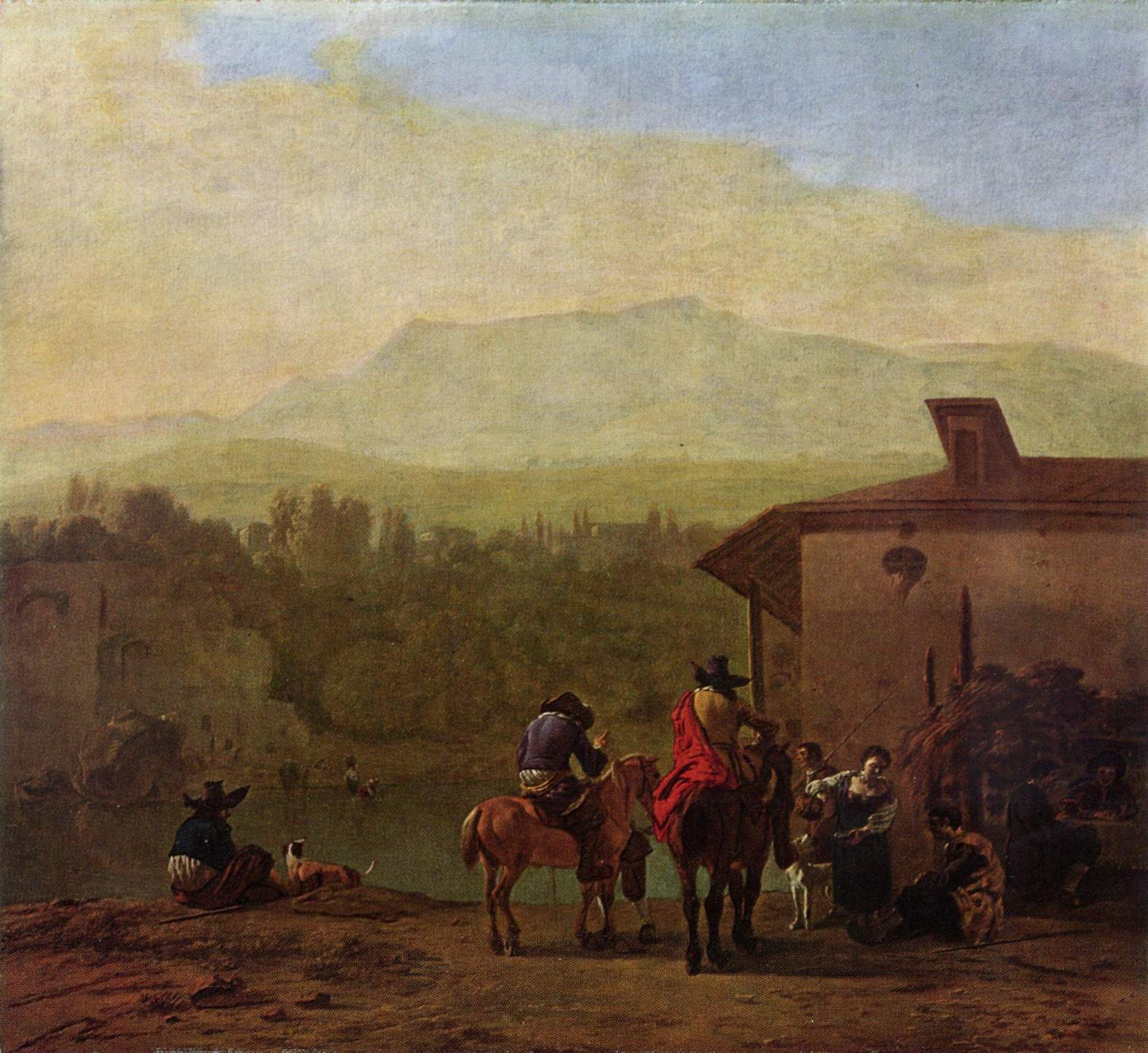
Rest at an Italian inn

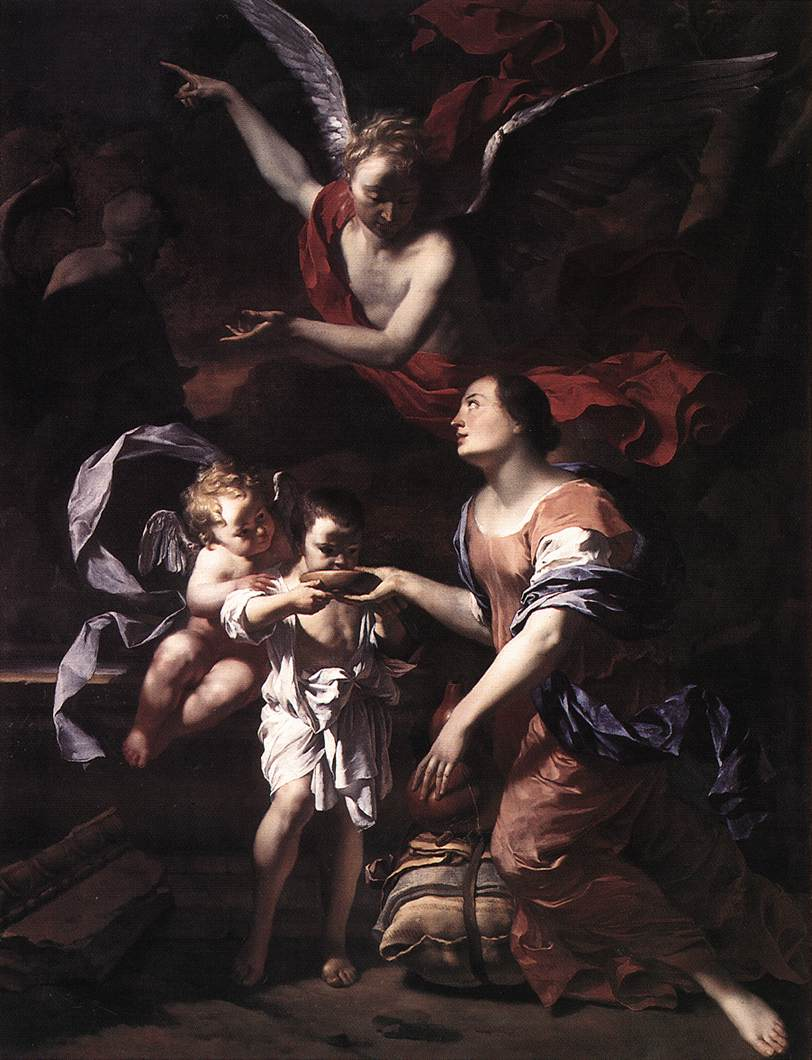
Hagar and Ishmael in the Wilderness

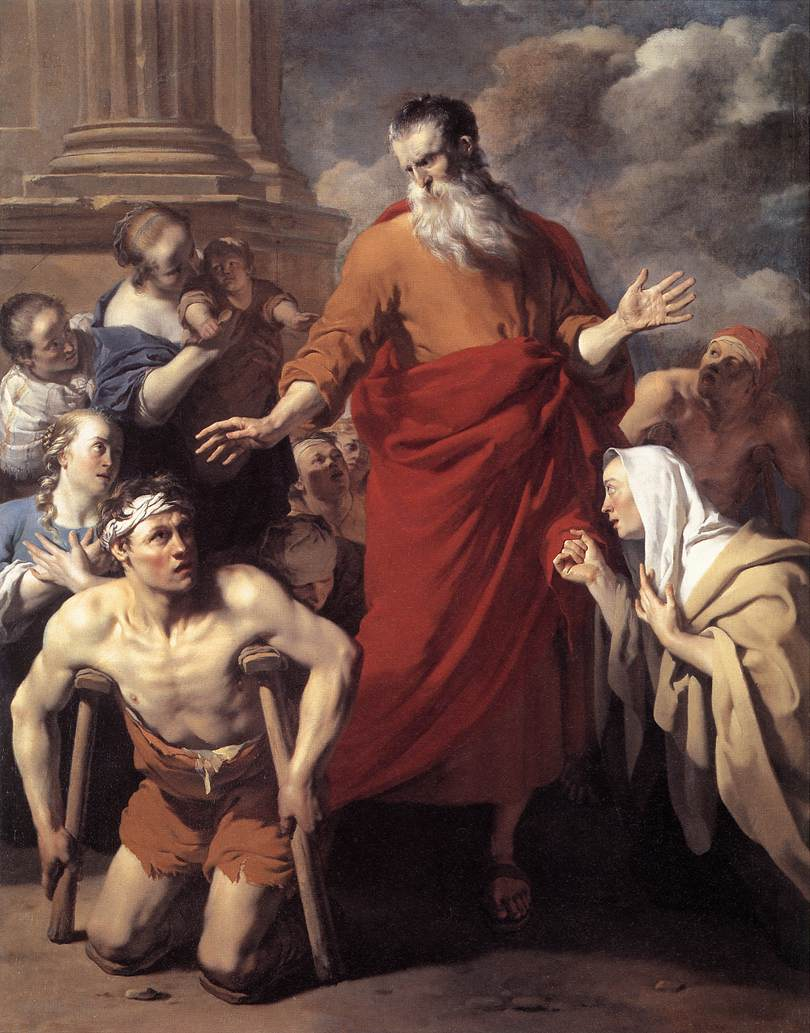
St. Paul healing the cripple at Lystra

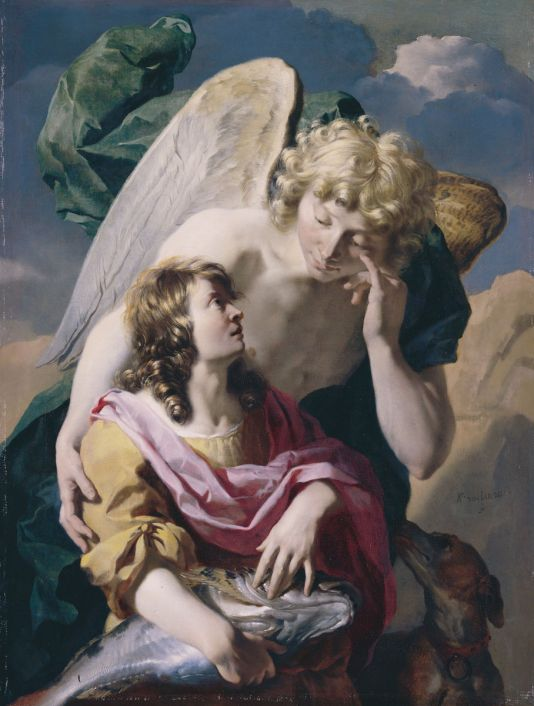
Tobias and the angel

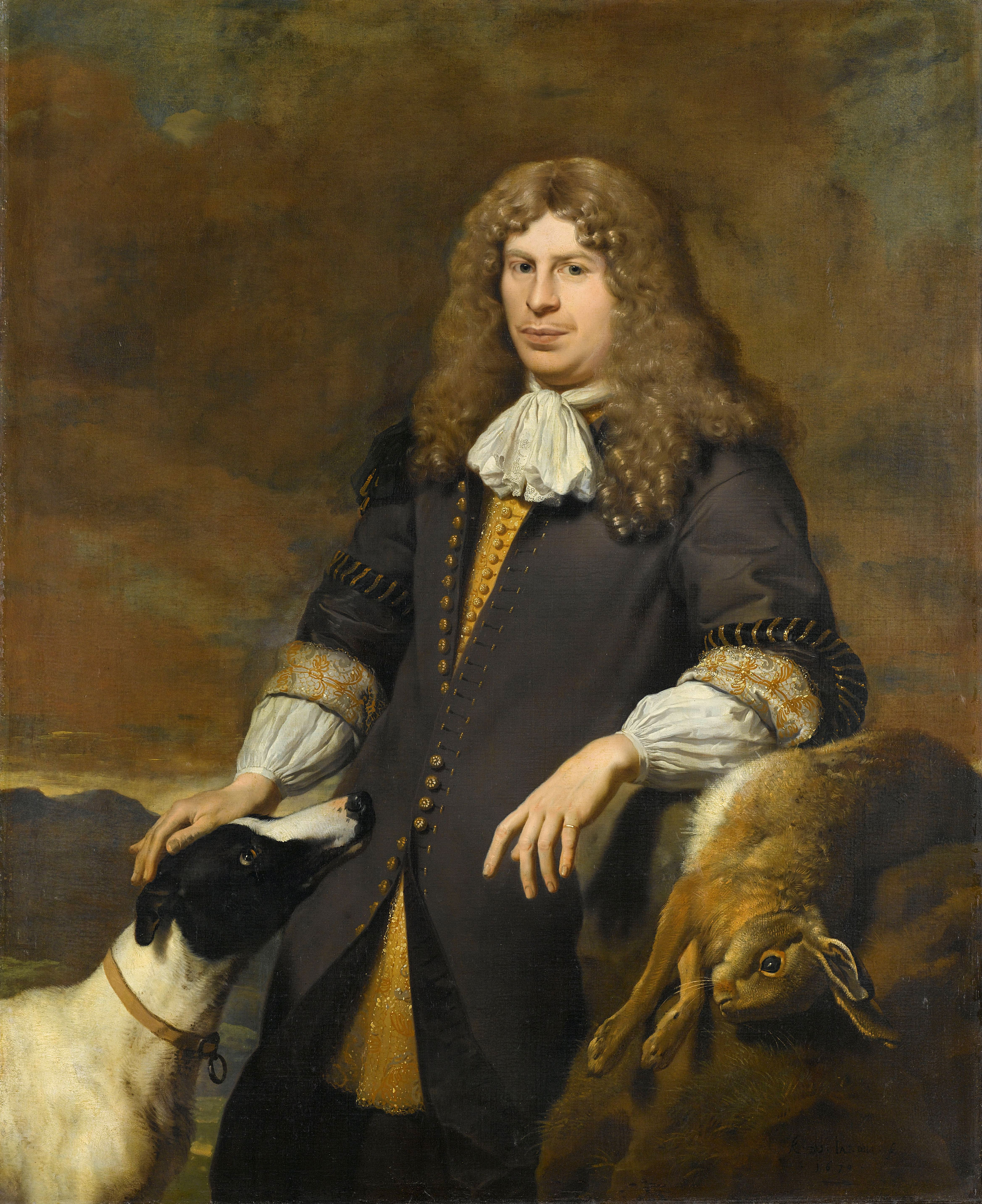
Jacob de Graeff (?), 1670
