= Confrerie Pictura =

Dutch painters' organization

The Confrerie Pictura was a more or less academic club of artists founded in 1656 in The Hague (the Netherlands) by local art painters, who were unsatisfied by the Guild of Saint Luke there.

== History ==
The guild of St. Luke in the Hague existed already in the 15th century and like most large Dutch cities, it catered not just to painters, but were united also with glaziers, engravers, sculptors, goldsmiths, printers and book sellers. In those days guilds were represented in churches with their own altars, and in the case of the painters' guild, they were sponsored by the church, and sometimes even ensured an income for church fathers through donations to the St. Luke's altar. After the Protestant Reformation, this all changed, and the churches were no longer a part of guild life. With the altarpieces gone that had traditionally been the public signboard for the artists, a new venue was necessary for sales. In addition, with the influx of talented painters from the Southern Netherlands cities such as Antwerp, the guild fathers felt that more protective measures were necessary. When securing a new protective charter for the St. Luke's guild failed to have the desired effect, the Confrerie Pictura was set up by 48 dissatisfied painters. They were led by the first deacon and popular Hague portrait painter Adriaen Hanneman.

Among the founders were Willem Doudijns (1630–1697), Jacob van der Does (1623–1673), Jan de Bisschop (1628–1671), Theodor van der Schuer, Dirck van der Lisse, Daniel Mijtens the Younger, Johannes Mytens, Willem van Diest, Adriaen van de Venne, Robbert Duval, Joris van der Haagen and Augustinus Terwesten.

== Charter of 1656 ==
The goal of the Confrerie Pictura was to protect the Hague painters and to reinforce ties between its members. Everyone working as a painter in The Hague was obliged to be a member of the Confrerie. Guilds installed strict rules to restrict what was seen as unfair trading, but also obliged its members to attend the funerals of its members for instance. The Confrerie had a set of 28 rules. One important rule was that its members were obliged to exhibit their works permanently at their meeting room. As soon as a work had been sold it had to be replaced by a new one. The Confrerie started meeting upstairs at the Boterwaag building, where butter was traded at the Prinsegracht. They paid rent by donating a painting to the city council. The Confrerie was governed by a deacon (deken), three governors (hoofdmannen) and a secretary, who were chosen every two years by the Magistrate of The Hague.

== Haagse Tekenacademie ==
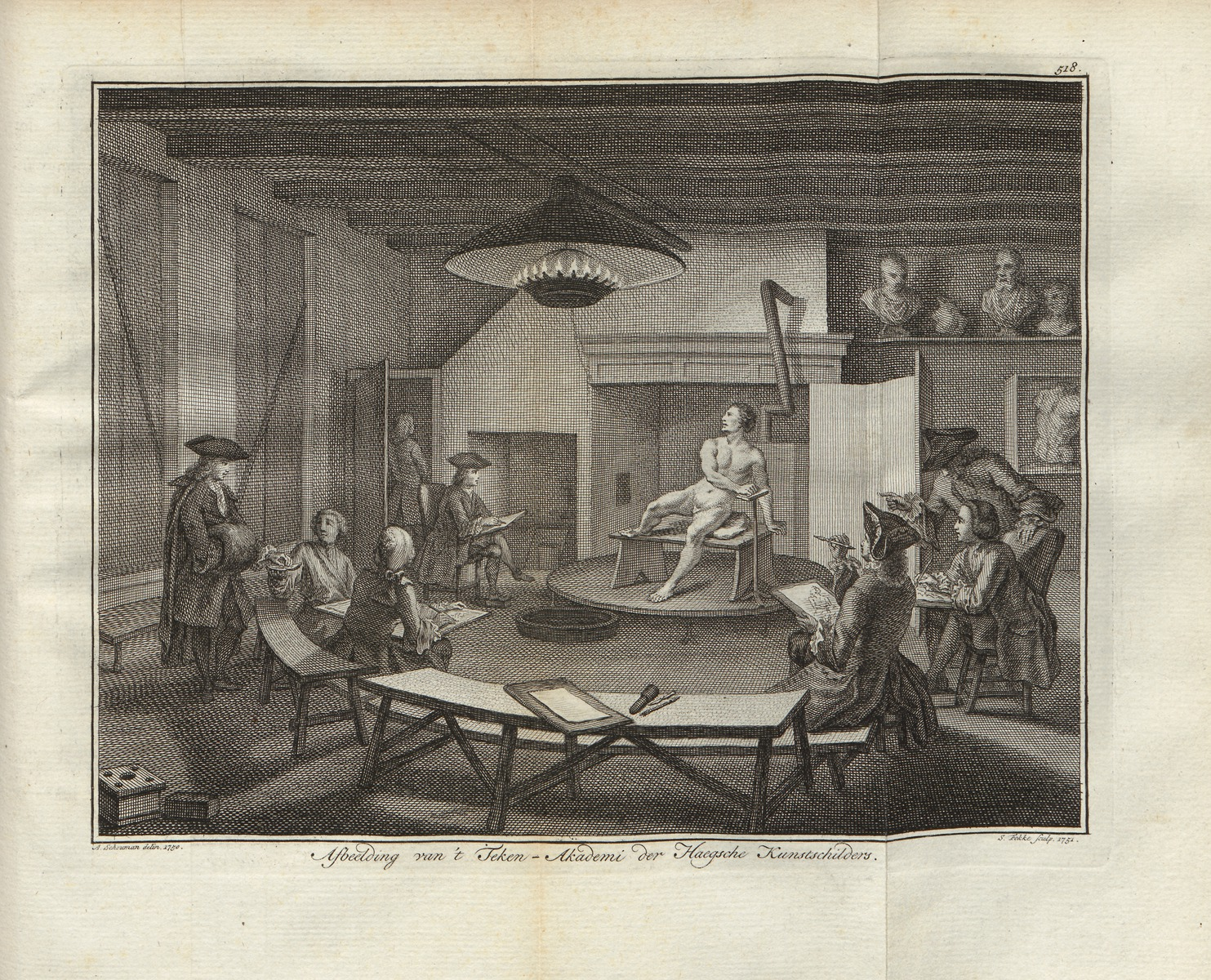
Engraving by Simon Fokke after Aart Schouman of a drawing lesson from live model at the "Teken-Akademi der Haagsche Kunstschilders", first published in 1750 in Johan van Gool's "Nieuwe Schouburg

Later, in the 1680s the Confrerie received a somewhat better place at the Koorenhuis, the building where wheat was traded, also on the Prinsegracht. They had four separate rooms at the upper floor of this building.

In 1682, several members of Confrerie Pictura: Willem Doudijns, Daniel Mijtens the Younger, Augustinus Terwesten, Theodor van der Schuer and Robbert Duval, founded a proper art school called The Hague Drawing Academy. (Dutch: Haagsche Teekenacademie) It would occupy one of the rooms in the Koorenhuis building. The academy proved to be a success, and later on it would transform into the Royal Academy of Art, The Hague, which still exists today. The original building is undergoing a restoration and expansion, but still exists (though damaged in the second world war) on the Prinsessegracht 4 in the Hague. Many original works of the founders and early members can be seen in the building's decorations.

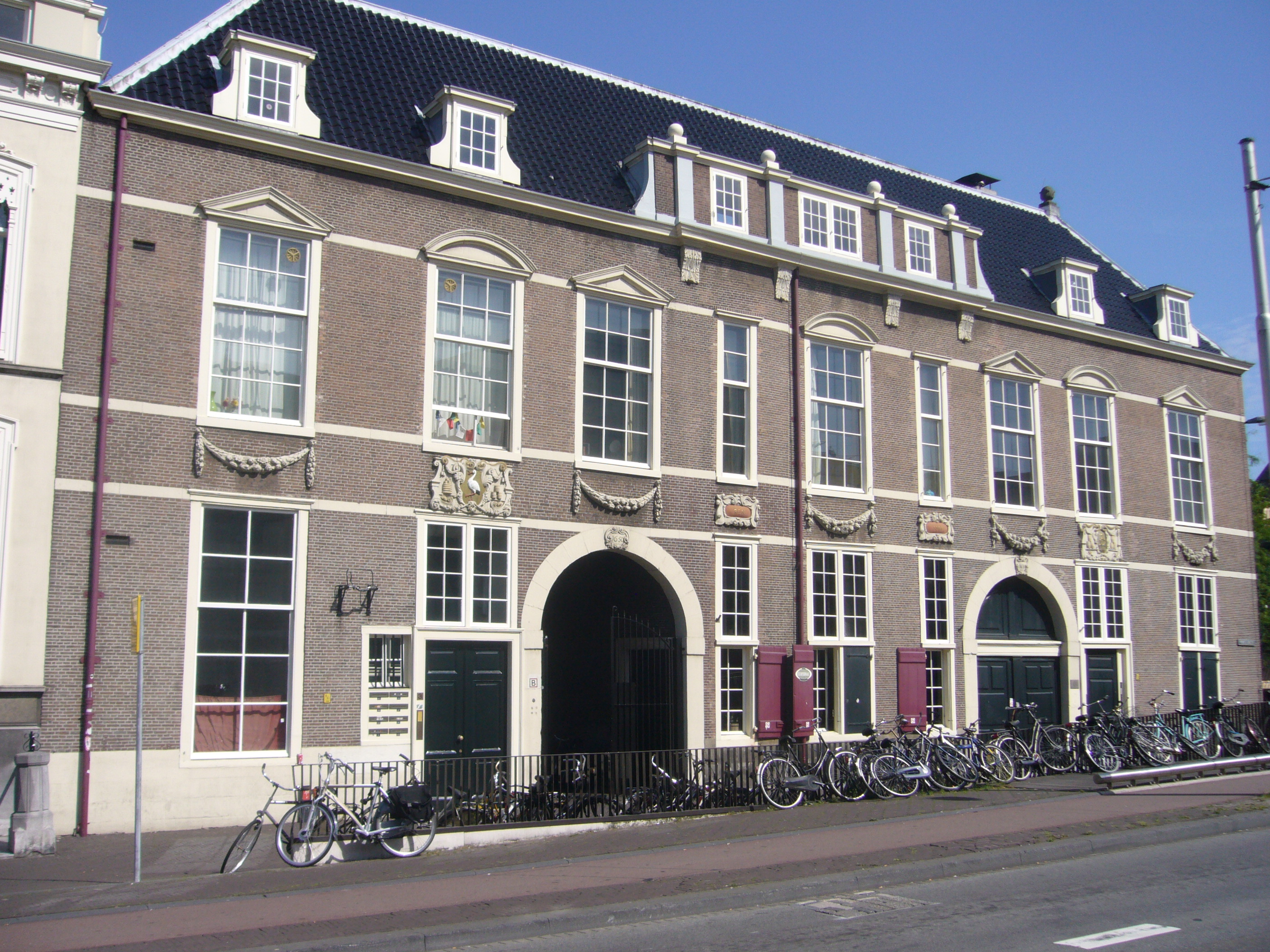
The Boterwaag on the Prinsegracht in Den Haag. The leftmost side was the original building from 1650 with the swan above the door. The painters moved in when the butter weighing moved to the larger right side extension.

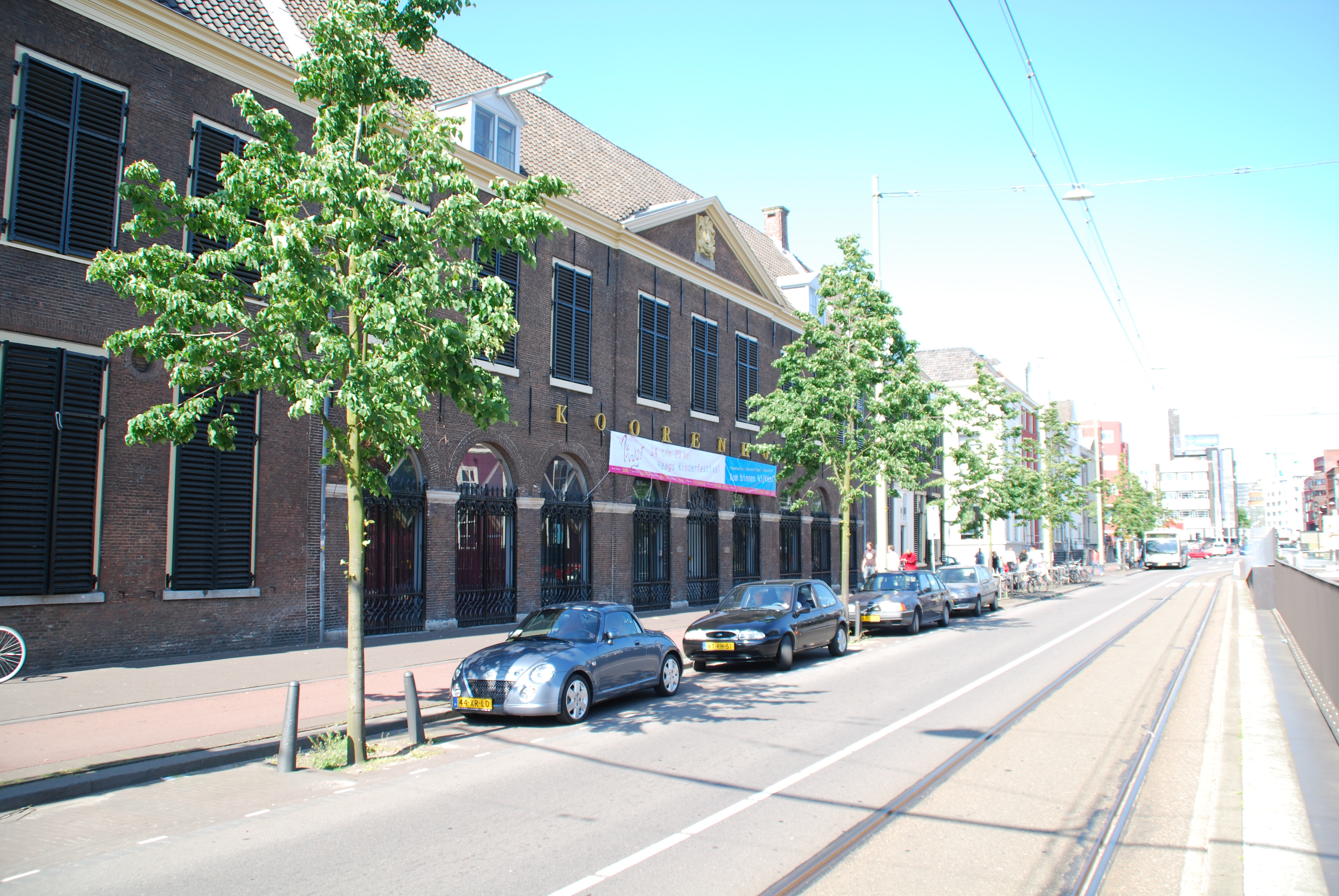
Koorenhuis on Prinsegracht 27, built in 1662–1663, now an arts center, only the facade and hall remain of the original building.

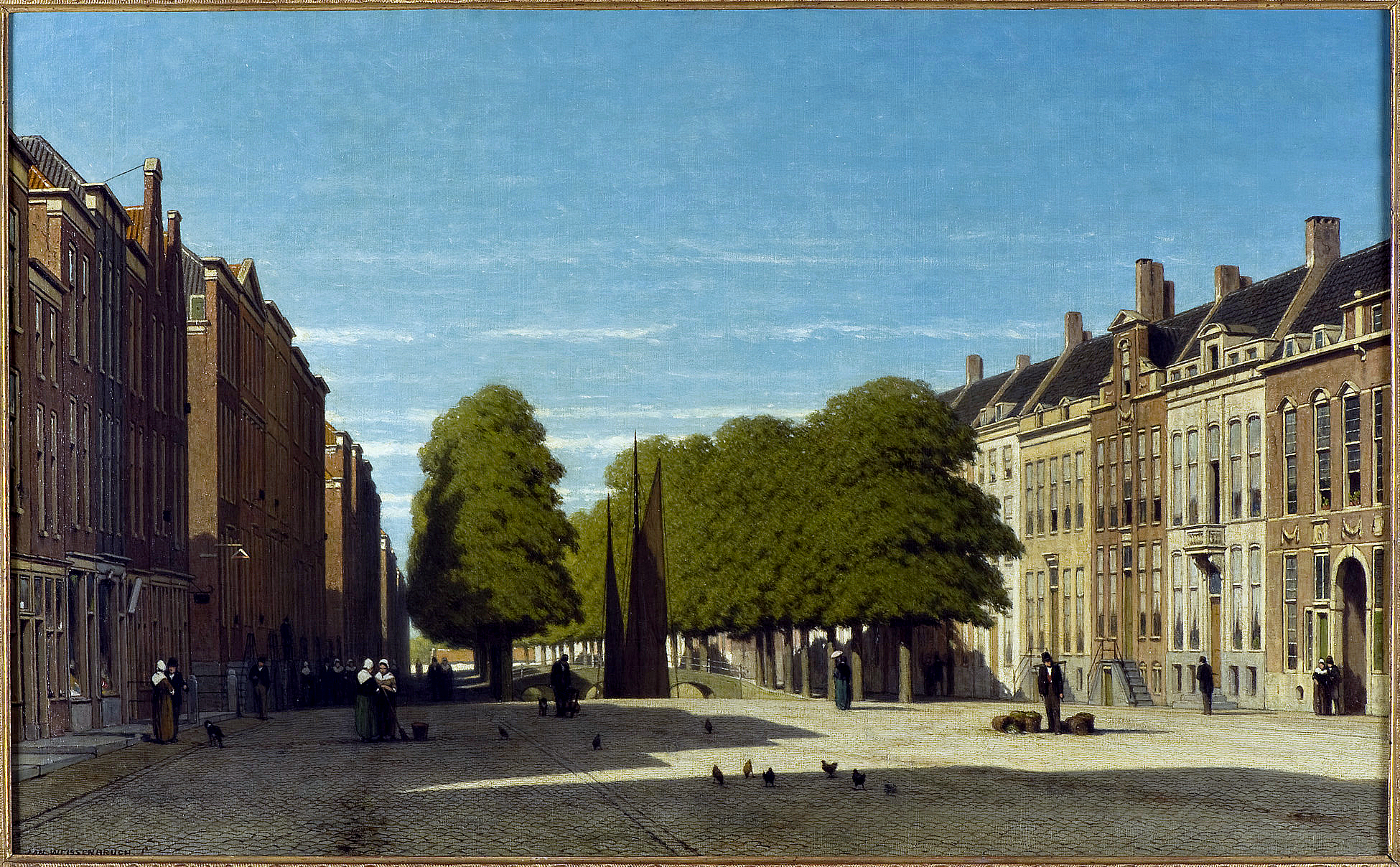
Prinsegracht in The Hague, ± 1850, by Jan Weissenbruch

== Legacy ==
Paying dues to a second guild in addition to Confrerie Pictura proved too expensive for most painters, however protective it was, and the St. Luke's guild was soon to be dissolved. Confrerie Pictura existed until 1849, when the newly founded art society Pulchri Studio (founded 1847) proved to be a more modern alternative.

== See also ==
- Guild
- Guild of Saint Luke
- Royal Academy of Art, The Hague
