= Augustinus Terwesten =

Dutch painter and engraver (1649–1711)

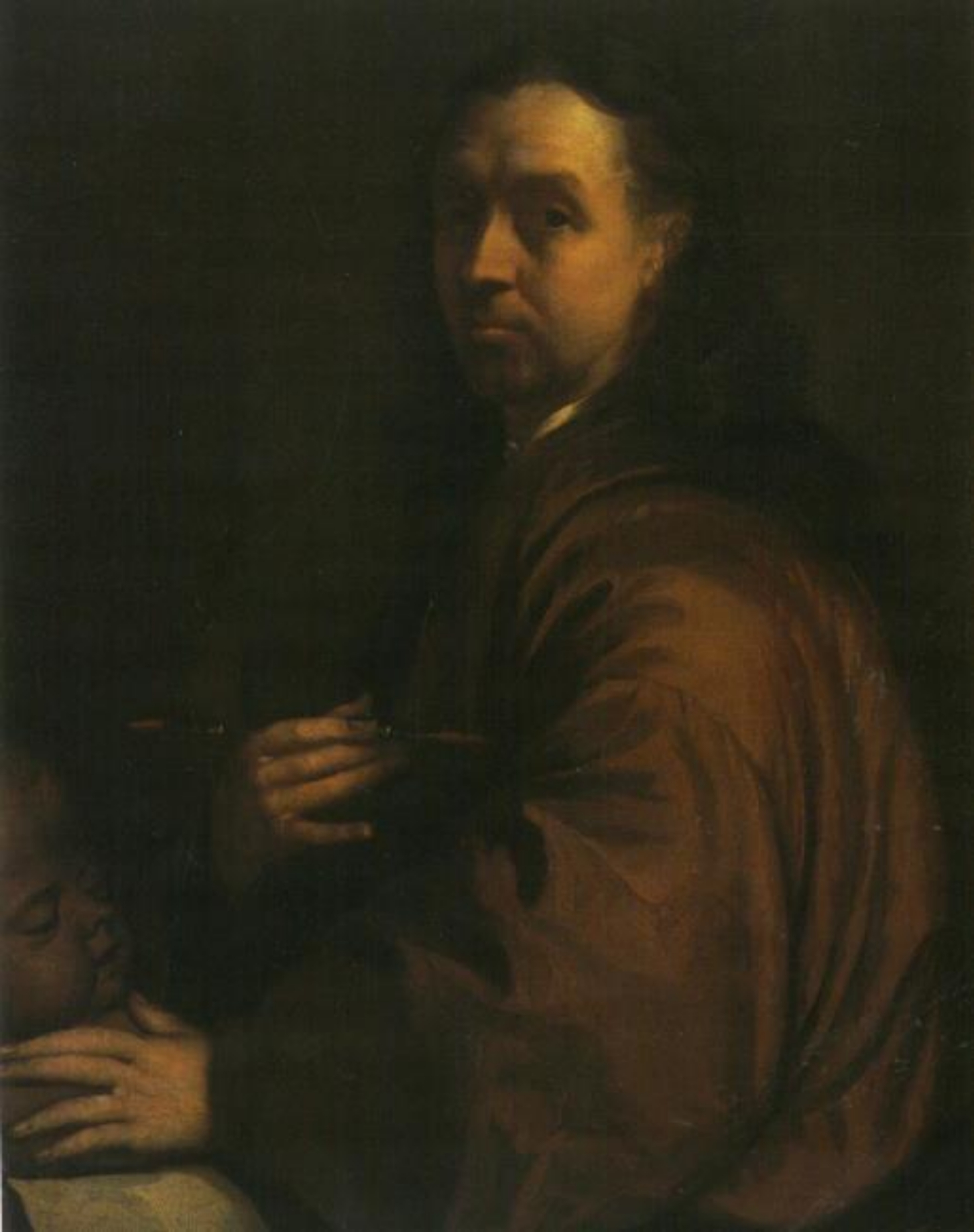
- Self-portrait, c. 1682
- Born: 4 May 1649; The Hague, Netherlands
- Died: 21 January 1711; Berlin, Germany
- Known for: Painting, engraving

Augustinus Terwesten or Augustinus Terwesten the Elder (4 May 1649 – 21 January 1711) was a Dutch painter, draughtsman, printmaker and art educator. He specialized in portraits, architectural and historical themes. He was known in his time for his decorative paintings in luxurious residences many of which have since disappeared. He left a great many preparatory drawings. He was a co-founder of The Hague Drawing Academy. He worked for a long time in Berlin where he was court painter to Frederick William I of Prussia and one of the cofounders of the Prussian Academy of Arts.

== Early years in the Hague ==
Terwesten was born in The Hague of parents of German origin. His father, Hans Jacob Terwesten or Zurwesten, was originally from Augsburg while his mother Catharina came from Berlin. They had married in The Hague in 1648, where Hans Jacob worked as a goldsmith. The marriage produced ten children, of whom three sons and two daughters survived. Augustinus was the oldest son. Ezaias, the middle son of the family, also worked temporarily in his father's workshop and settled later in Rome as a flower and fruit painter. The youngest brother Mattheus later followed in Augustinus footsteps and often worked together with him on commissions.

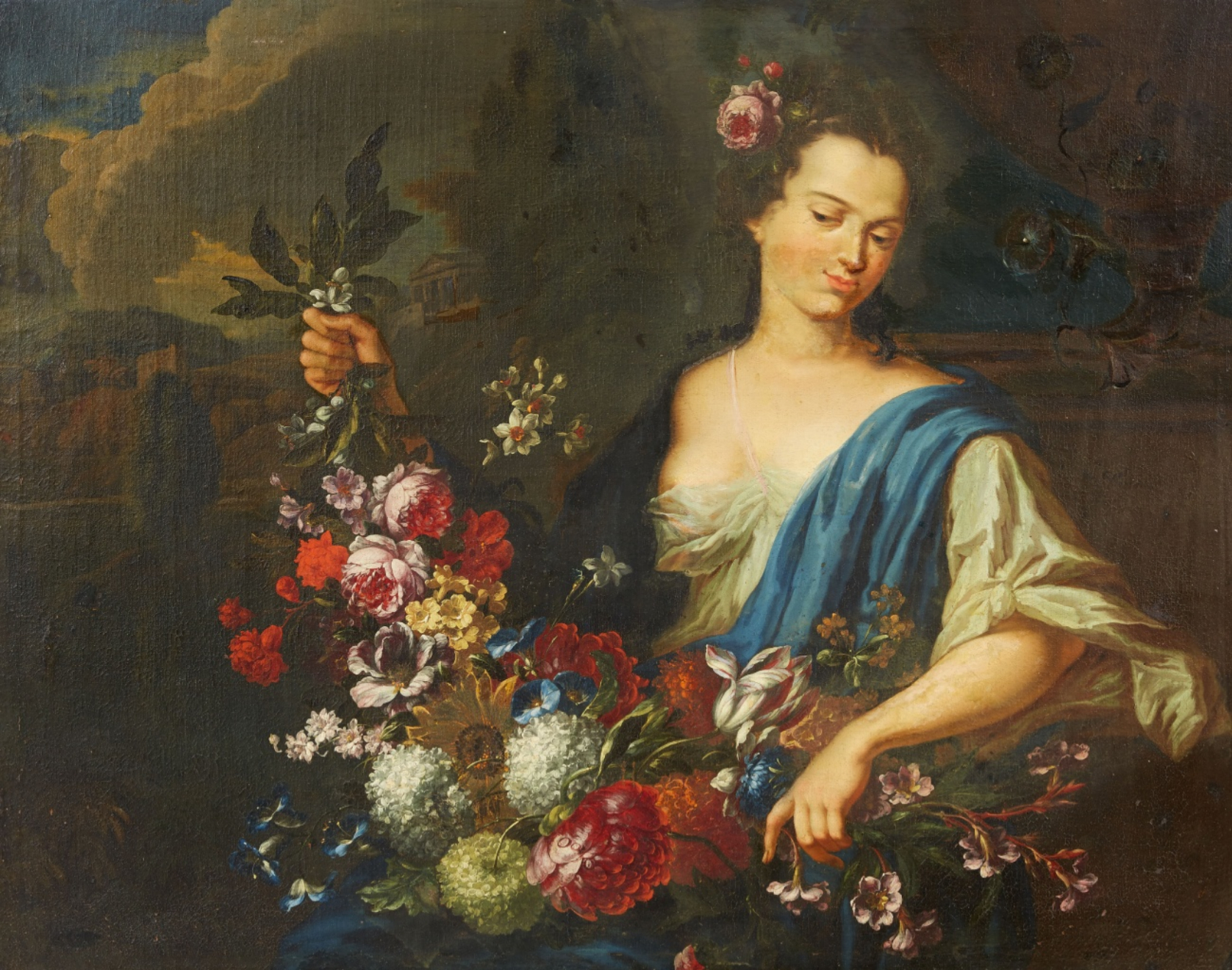
Young woman with flower garland

In his father's workshop Augustinus learned the art of engraving, goldsmithing and wax modelling. This was followed by two years of apprenticeship with the history painter Nicolaes Willingh, who became court painter to the Great Elector in Berlin in 1667. He then took lessons from Willem Doudyns for two years before setting off on a Grand Tour through Germany to Italy in 1672, where he spent three years.

== Grand Tour to Rome and the Bentvueghels ==
In Rome he became a member of the painters' circle known as the Bentvueghels, where he earned the nickname "Patrysvogel", or partridge, after the story of Perdix by Ovid. He went back to the Hague via France and England, and was gone for a total of 6 years. In 1678, he set up a workshop in the Hague specialized in wall and ceiling decorations. 1682–1683 he helped to set up the Drawing Academy in the Hague set up by the "Confrerie Pictura".

== German professor ==
In 1692 he became court painter to the son of his former royal patron, Frederick I of Prussia, in Berlin, and talked him into sponsoring an Akademie der Künste. After overseeing the building of this academy which was completed in 1697, he became professor there and lived there until his death in 1711. He taught both of his brothers Elias and Mattheus Terwesten, but also the painters Frans Beeldemaker, Nikolaus Bruno Belau, Andries Bertoen, Jacobus Bisschop, Nicolaes Hooft, and Cornelis Michiarus.

He is remembered today for his historical allegories and portraits.

Three of his paintings, including 'Hera, Queen of the Heavens', are on display in the Crush Room at the Royal Opera House, Covent Garden, London.
