= Johann Rudolf Glauber =

German-Dutch alchemist (1604–1670)

- Born: 10 March 1604; Karlstadt am Main, Germany
- Died: 16 March 1670 (aged 66); Amsterdam, Netherlands
- Known for: "Glauber's salt"
- Children: 8, including Johannes Glauber

Johann Rudolf Glauber (10 March 1604 – 16 March 1670) was a German-Dutch alchemist and chemist. Some historians of science have described him as one of the first chemical engineers. His discovery of sodium sulfate in 1625 led to the compound being named after him: "Glauber's salt".

== Life ==
Born in 1604 in Karlstadt am Main, the son of a barber, he was one of a large family and did not finish school, but is thought to have studied pharmacy and visited laboratories. He said that he was glad that he had not suffered the grind of high school but had instead learned by experience. He lived in Vienna (1625), Salzburg, Giessen, Wertheim (1649–1651), Kitzingen (1651–1655), Basel, Paris, Frankfurt am Main, Cologne and Amsterdam (1640–1644, 1646–1649, 1656–death). He worked first manufacturing mirrors and later for two periods as Apothecary to the court in Giessen, the second time as the Chief Apothecary, leaving because of the Thirty Years War. In Amsterdam he built up a business manufacturing pharmaceuticals (including chemicals such as Glauber's salt). This led to both great financial success and, in 1649, bankruptcy, which is the reason for his move from Amsterdam to Wertheim.

He married twice and, with his second wife Helena Cornelius (married 1641), had eight children. His son Johannes Glauber probably helped him with his engraved illustrations.

In 1660 he became seriously ill, which has been attributed to poisoning from the various heavy metals used in his work, and in 1666 was crippled by a fall from a wagon and was confined to bed for the rest of his life. As a result, he had to sell off books and equipment to provide for his family. He died on 16 March 1670 in Amsterdam.

== Work ==
Glauber conducted studies on the chemistry of wine production and had commercial success through licensing improvements. He was also an apothecary, supplying medicines and known for providing free medical treatment to the poor. He is known for his contributions to inorganic chemistry and the fact that he was able to live from the proceeds of chemical production based upon his discoveries and was thus an industrial chemist. His improvements to chemical processes and equipment (notably furnaces and distillation devices) make him an early chemical engineer.

He was the first to produce concentrated hydrochloric acid in 1625 by combining sulfuric acid and table salt. He also made an improved process for the manufacture of nitric acid in 1648 by heating potassium nitrate with concentrated sulfuric acid. His production of sodium sulfate, which he called sal mirabilis or "wonderful salt", brought him fame and the honor of being named "Glauber's salt". It was an effective and relatively safe laxative at a time when purging (emptying the digestive tract) was a popular treatment for many diseases.

The chemical garden (or silica garden) was first observed by Glauber and described by him in 1646. In its original form, the chemical garden involved the introduction of ferrous chloride (FeCl_{2}) crystals into a solution of potassium silicate (K_{2}SiO_{3}, water glass).

He was the first to synthesize and isolate antimony trichloride, arsenic trichloride, tin tetrachloride and zinc chloride.

In addition, he wrote about 40 books. A visionary one is Dess Teutschlands Wohlfahrt (Germany's Prosperity), in which he proposed the chemical industries as a means for Germany's economic recovery after the Thirty Years War.

== Selected publications ==
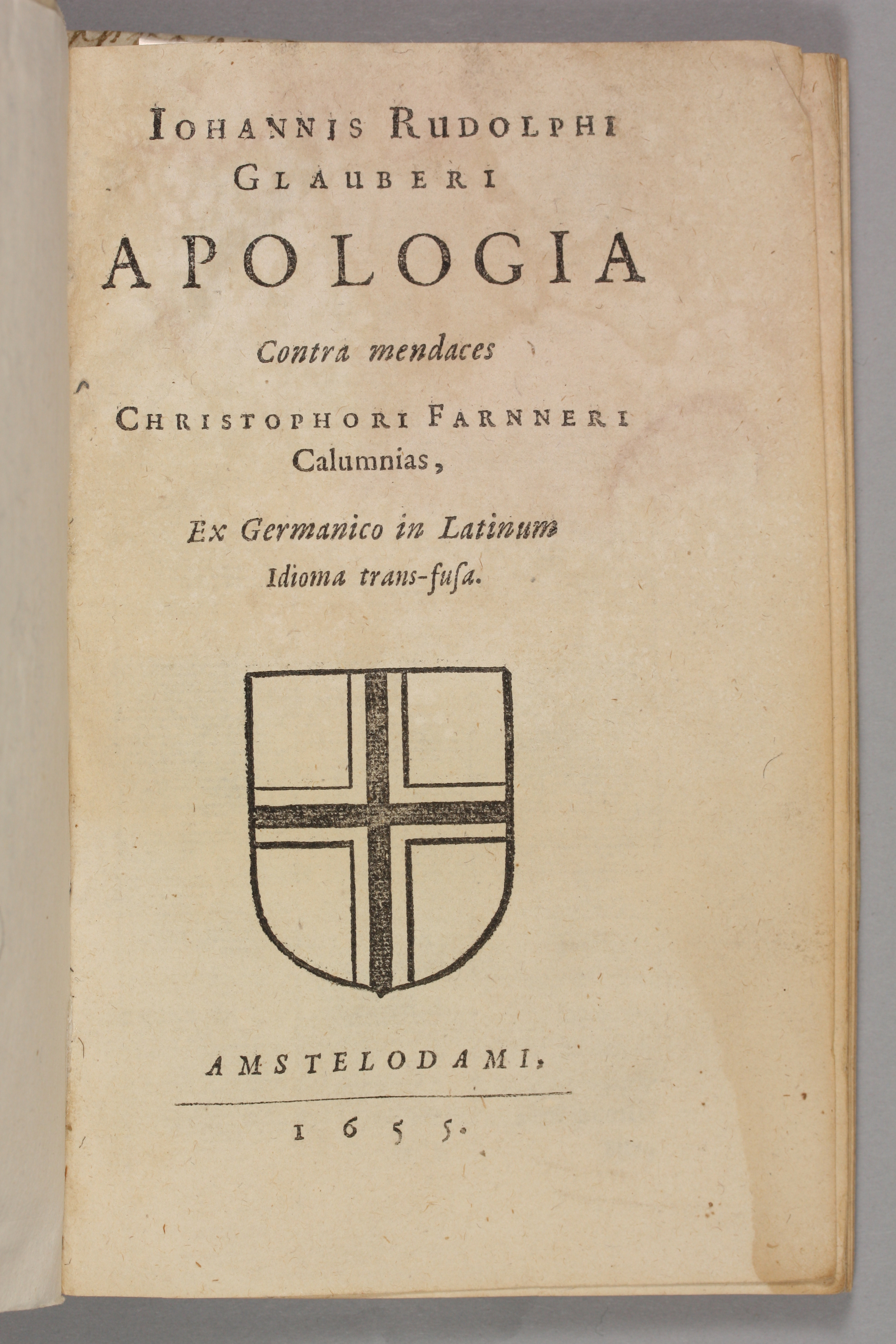
Apologia contra mendaces Christophori Farnneri, 1655

- Dess Teutschlands Wohlfahrt 1656–1661
- Operis mineralis Oder Vieler künstlichen und nutzlichen metallischen Arbeiten Beschreibung, 1651–1652
- Opera omnia (Collected Works), 7 vols 1669
- De Auri Tinctura sive Auro Potabili Vero: Was solche sey/ vnnd wie dieselbe von einem falschen vnd Sophistischen Auro Potabili zu vnterscheiden vnd zu erkennen ... wozu solche in Medicina könne gebraucht werden. Beschrieben vnd an Tag gegeben Durch Joh. Rud. Glauberum 1646
- Furni Novi Philosophici Oder Beschreibung einer New-erfundenen Distilir-Kunst: Auch was für Spiritus, Olea, Flores, und andere dergleichen Vegetabilische/ Animalische/ und Mineralische Medicamenten/ damit ... können zugericht und bereytet werden, 2 vols. 1646-1647
- Miraculum Mundi, oder Außführliche Beschreibung der wunderbaren Natur/ Art/ vnd Eigenschafft/ deß Großmächtigen Subiecti: Von den Alten Menstruum Vniversale oder Mercurius Philosophorum genandt. . - an Tag geben/ vnd jetzo auff das newe corrigiret vnd verbesert Durch Iohann Rudolph Glaubern, 7 vols. 1653–1658
- Johann Rudolf Glauberi Apologia oder Verthaidigung gegen Christoff Farners Lügen und Ehrabschneidung, 2 vols 1655
- Zweyte Apologia, oder Ehrenrettung gegen Christoff Farnern, Speyerischen Thom-Stiffts Schaffnern zu Löchgaw, unmenschliche Lügen und Ehrabschneidung 1656
- Tractatus De Medicina Universali, Sive Auro Potabili Vero. Oder Außführliche Beschreibung einer wahren Universal Medicin: wie auch deroselben Wunderbahrlichen grossen Krafft und Wirckung. . - Der jetzigen blinden Welt ... wolmeinend beschrieben und an Tag gegeben Durch Johan. Rudolph. Glauber, 2 vols. 1657
- Tractatus de natura salium, 2 vols 1658–1659
- Tractatus de signatura salium, metallorum, et planetarum, sive fundamentalis institutio, evident. monstrans, quo pacto facillime non solum salium, metall., atque planetarum ... supputari queant (1658) (Digital edition from 1703)
- Opera chymica: Bücher und Schrifften, so viel deren von ihme bißhero an Tag gegeben worden; jetzo vom neuen übersehen und vermehret (Collected Works), 2 vols 1658–1659 (Digital edition)
- Explicatio oder Außlegung über die Wohrten Salomonis: In herbis, verbis, et lapidibus, magna est virtus, 2 vols. 1663–1664
- Libellus dialogorum, sive colloquia, nonnullorum Hermeticae medicinae, ac tincturae universalis 1663
- Novum lumen chimicum: oder e. new-erfundenen u.d. Weldt noch niemahlen bekand-gemachten hohen Secreti Offenbarung 1664
- Von den dreyen Anfangen der Metallen, alß Schwefel, Mercurio und Salz der Weisen 1666
- Tractatus de tribus principiis metallorum, videlicet sulphure, mercurio et sale philosophorum, quemadmodzum illa in medicina, alchymia aliisque artibus associatis utiliter adhiberi valeant 1667
- Glauberus Concentratus Oder Laboratorium Glauberianum: Darinn die Specification, vnd Taxation dehren Medicinalischen/ vnd Chymischen Arcanitäten begriffen; Sambt Aller dehren künstlichen Oefen vnd Instrumenten ... Durch Den Authorem ... obgedachter Raritäten ... an tag gegeben 1668
- De Elia artista 1667
- De tribus lapidibus ignium secretorum: Oder von den drey Alleredelsten Gesteinen 1667 (Digital edition 1703)
- De lapide animali 1669
- Libellus ignium: Oder Feuer-Buechlein, Darinnen von unterschiedlichen frembden und biß Dato noch gantz unbekandten Feuern gehandelt: Wozu sie dienen und was für unglaubliche Dinge und unaußsprechlicher Nutzen dem Menschlichen Geschlecht dadurch kommen und zu wegen gebracht werden koenne. Zu Gottes Ehre und Dienst deß Nechsten wolmeinend beschrieben und an Tag gegeben durch Joh. Rudoph. Glauberum 1663 (Digital edition 1703)

== External sources ==
- Biography at the Galileo Project
