= Boterwaag =

Butter weigh house, The Hague
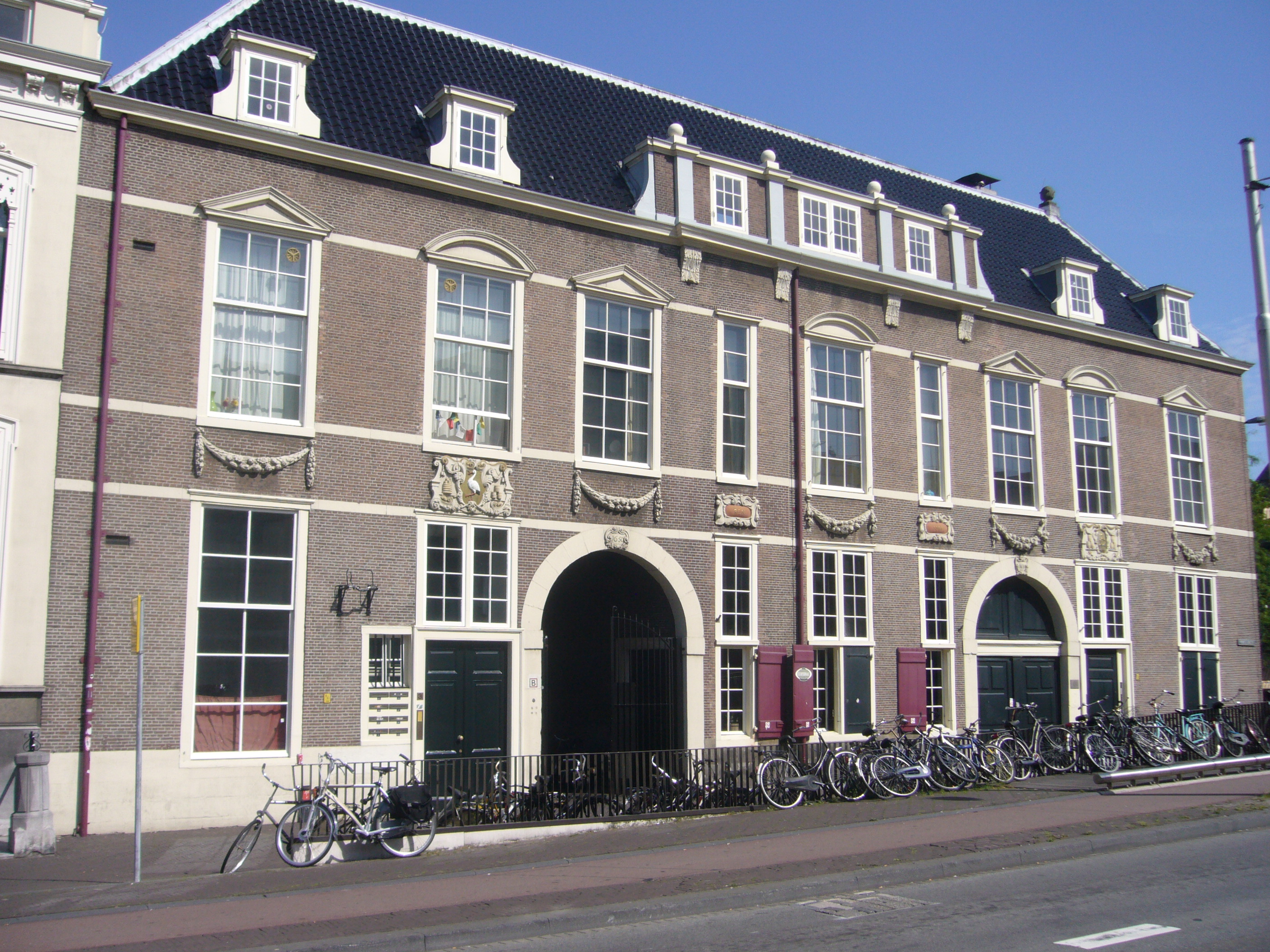
- The Boterwaag on the Prinsegracht
- Interactive map of the Butter weigh house, The Hague area
- Alternative names: Boterwaag

General information
- Type: Weigh house
- Architectural style: Neoclassical style
- Location: The Hague, Prinsegracht
- Coordinates: 52°4′31″N 4°18′31″E
- Completed: 1650/1681

Design and construction
- Architect: Bartholomeus van Bassen

The Boterwaag is a former weigh house for butter in The Hague, Netherlands. The right half is a café.

== History ==
The left-half of the building was designed by the architect-painter Bartholomeus van Bassen. He designed and built it in 1650, after the Prinsegracht canal was dug in 1640. He oversaw both projects in his role as city architect and headman of the Guild of St. Luke. After he died in 1652, the local painters became dissatisfied with the guild and founded the Confrerie Pictura in 1656, which met upstairs. They shared their meeting room upstairs with the guild of apothecaries, and the city apothecary shop was across the street. In 1681 the right half was built as an extension, and new scales were installed inside that can still be seen by visitors to the café there.

In 2013 a replica of the 17th-century brass bell was replaced on the facade that had been stolen in 1980s.

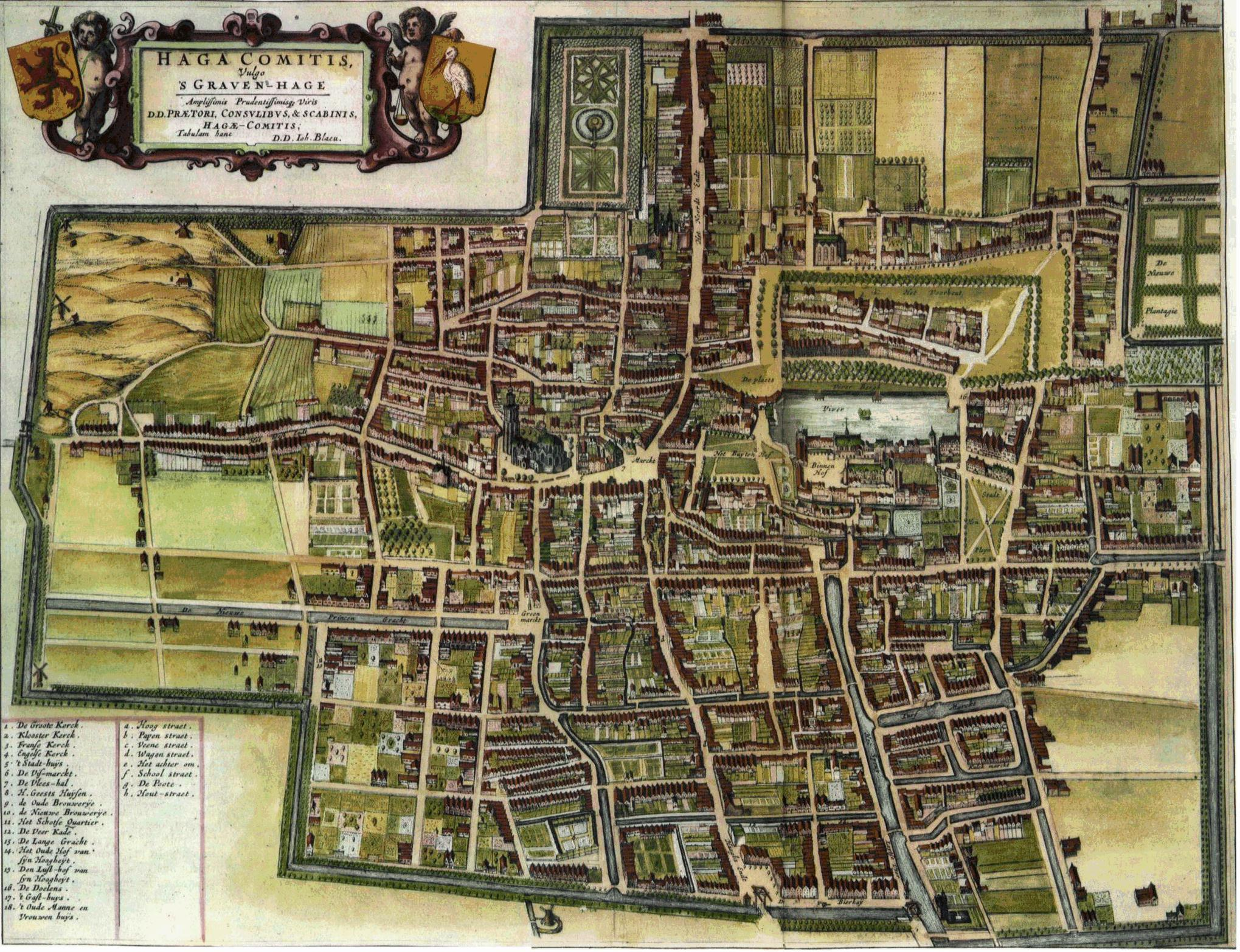
1652 map of The Hague by Joan Blaeu. The left half of the Boterwaag can be seen on the Princen Gracht.

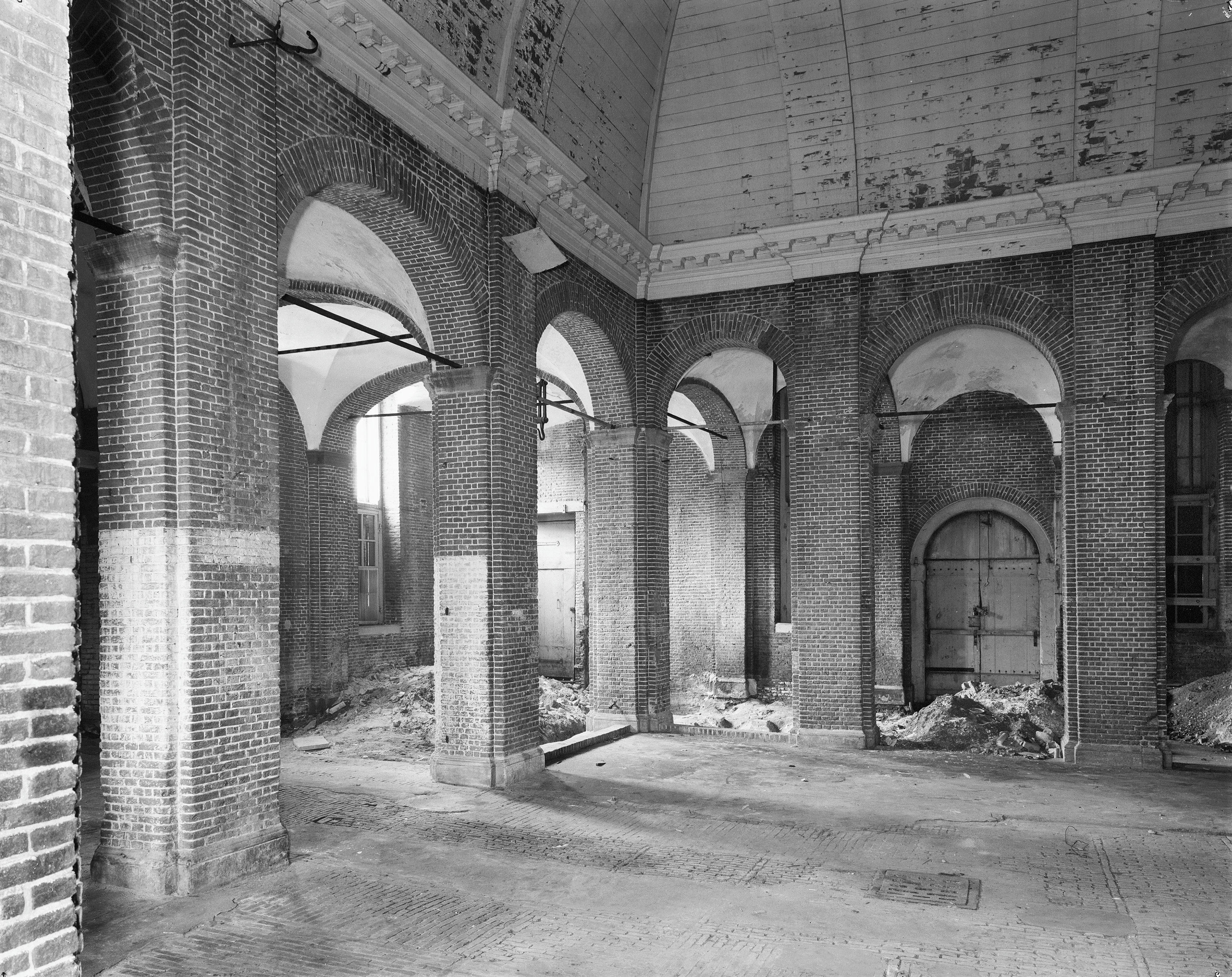
Inside the right half before restoration activity in 1980.

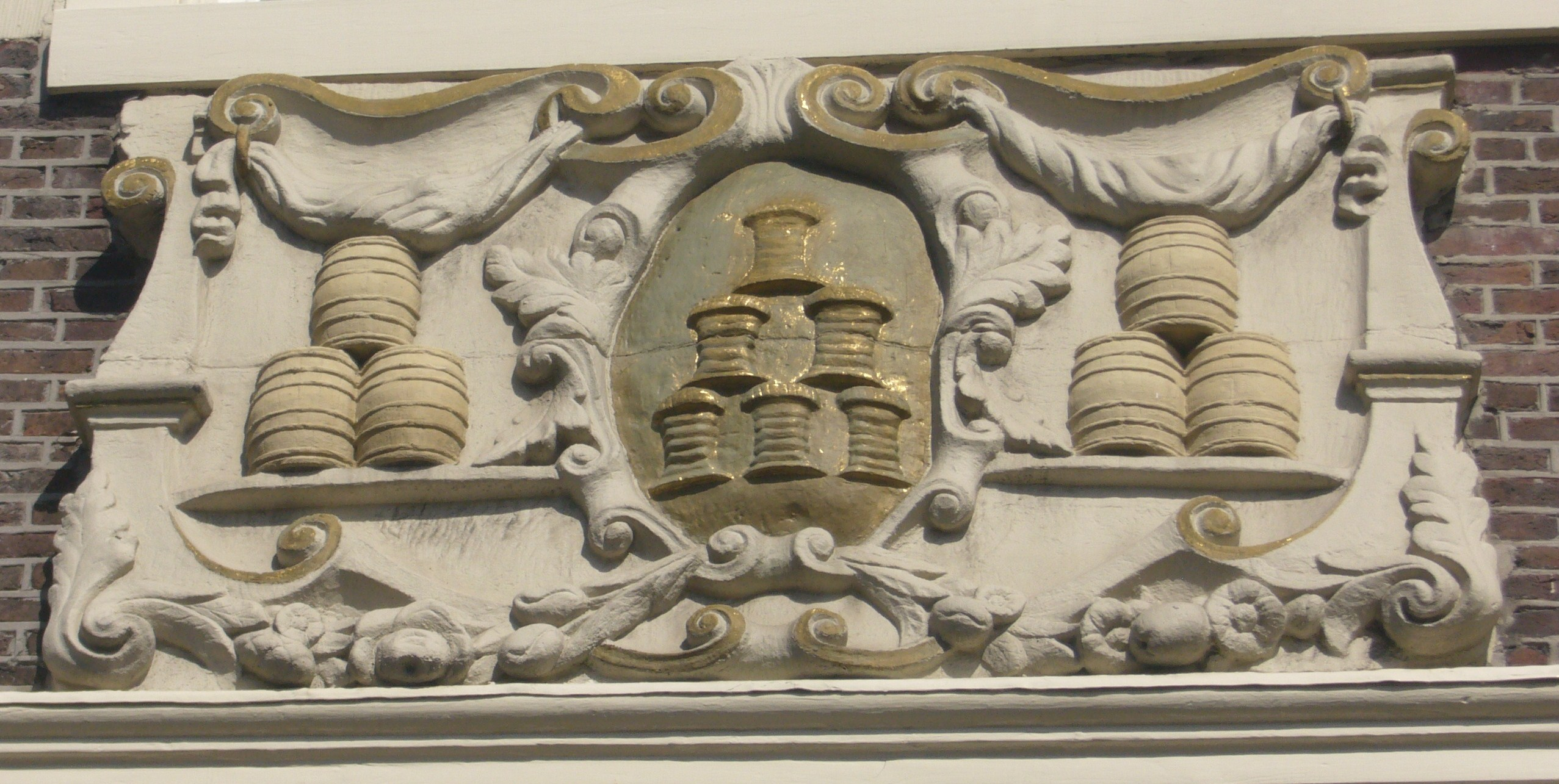
Gable stone with butter vats
