= Louis Fabricius Dubourg =

Dutch painter

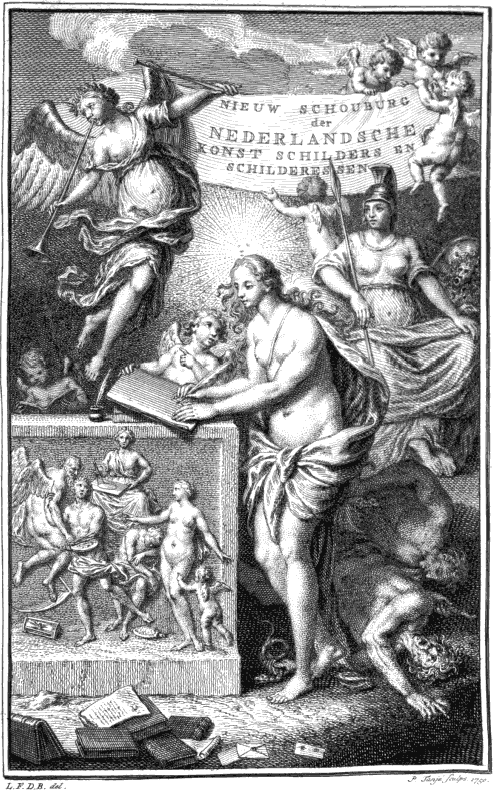
Titleplate from "Nieuw Schouburg", Jan van Gool's 1750 sequel to Arnold Houbraken's "Schouwburg" (1718). This version presents the writers in alphabetical order, rather than birth order, and makes many corrections and additions to the text. Later editions after 1751 do not include the original titlepage plate.

Louis Fabricius Dubourg or Louis Fabritius du Bourg (1693–1775) was an historical and academic painter of arcadian landscapes, and an engraver.

== Life ==
His parents Jean du Bourg(h) and Elisabeth Burlamacchi married in 1681. Louis Fabrice was baptized on 5 July 1693 in the Walloon church. He was a pupil of Gerard de Lairesse, Gerrit Rademaker (1672–1711) and Jacob van Huysum. In 1718 he became sexton of a small wooden church on Kerkstraat. Around 1726 he was practising foreshortening and may have been a member of an academy. When he married Eva de Kaarsgieter in 1729 he cooperated with Bernard Picart. After producing several beautiful pictures, some of which may be seen at the Westerkerk, the New Church and town hall of Amsterdam, he exchanged the brush for the graver, and executed some vignettes and other small compositions, and also etched a number of plates from his own designs.

He cooperated with members of the Stadstekenacademie, Amsterdam, as Jacob Folkema, François Morellon, Cornelis Troost, Simon Fokke, Michiel Elgersma and Pieter Tanjé, engravers. He was buried on 22 September 1775 the Amstelkerk, where he had lived most of his life. His collection of pictures and drawings was sold at an auction in 1776.

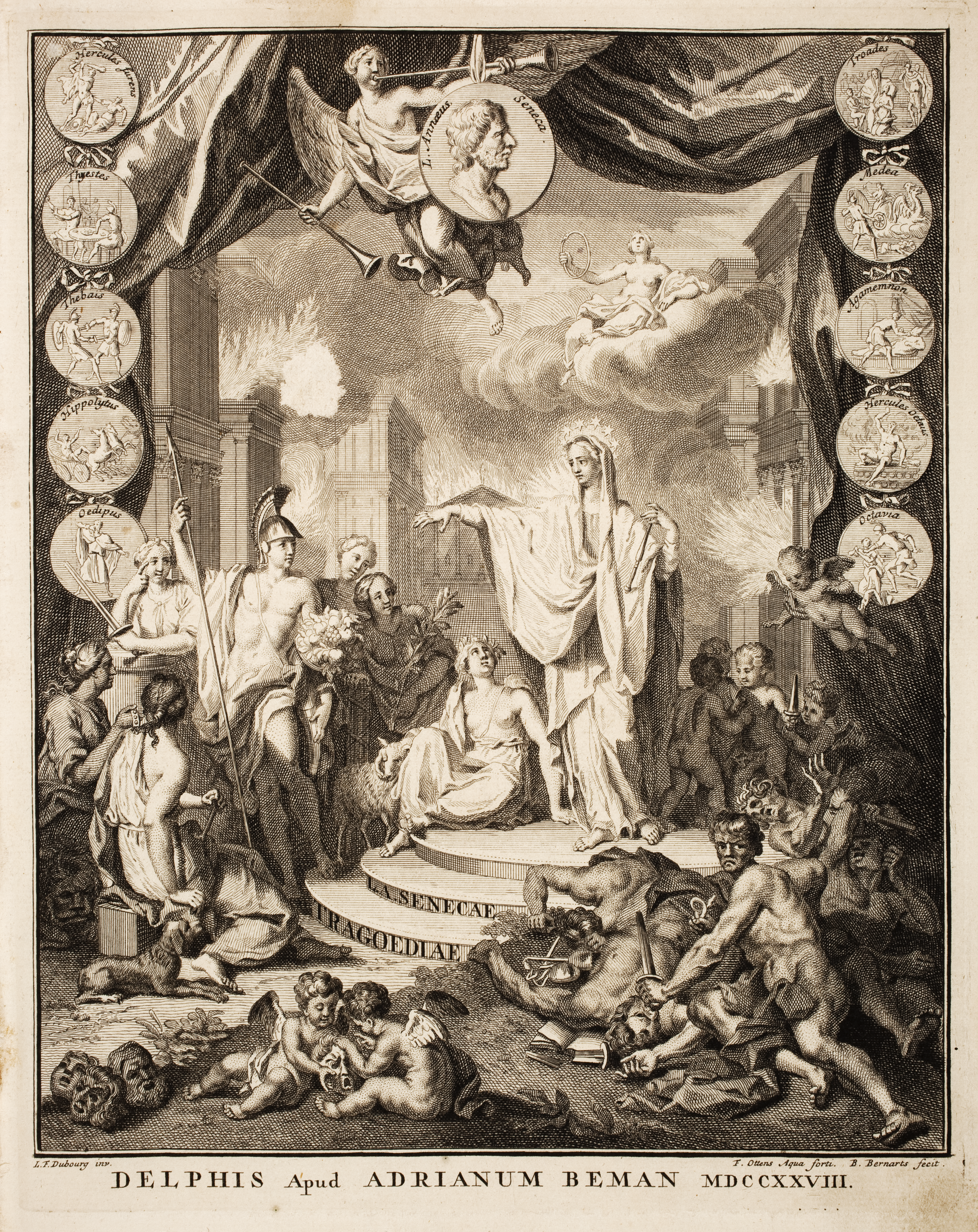
Title page after an image by Dubourg of an edition of Seneca's Tragedies, Delft 1728
