= Louis Dubourg =

Louis Dubourg may refer to:

- Louis William Valentine DuBourg (1766–1833), American Sulpician bishop of the Roman Catholic Church
- Louis Fabricius Dubourg (1693–1775), Dutch painter and engraver
