= Sara Troost =

Dutch artist (1732–1803)

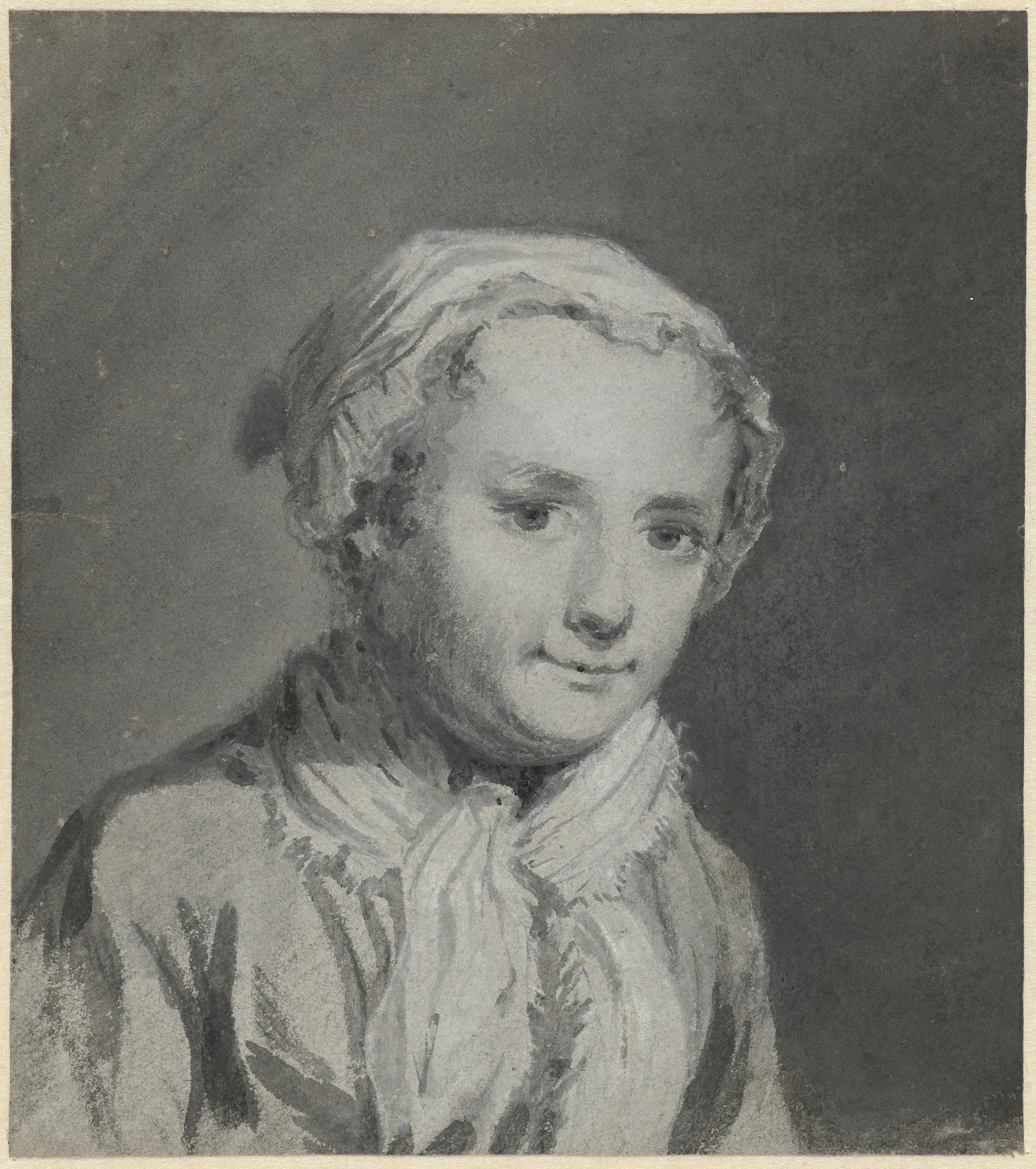
Portrait of Sara Troost by her father Cornelis Troost

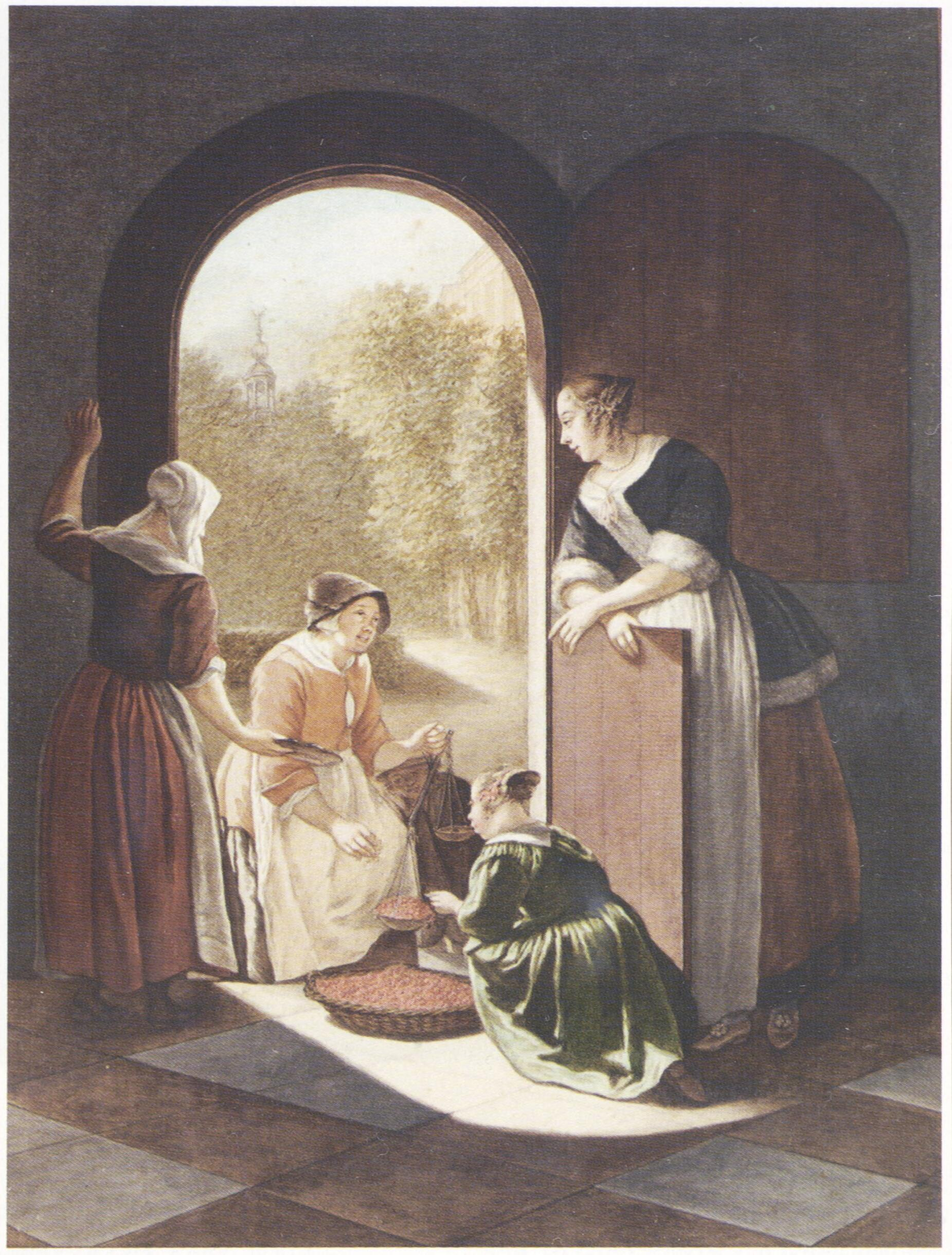
The Cherry Seller - watercolor after Jacob Ochtervelt, 1787

Sara Troost, or Sara Ploos van Amstel (1732–1803) was an 18th-century painter from the Dutch Republic.

== Biography ==
Troost was born and died in Amsterdam. According to the RKD, she was the daughter of the painter Cornelis Troost and actress and embroiderer Susanna Maria van der Duyn. She was a teacher of her cousin Christina Chalon. She married the printer Jacob Ploos van Amstel, and her sister Elisabeth married his brother, Cornelis Ploos van Amstel. Like him, she is known for watercolor copies of 17th century artists.
