= Christina Chalon =

Dutch artist (1748–1808)

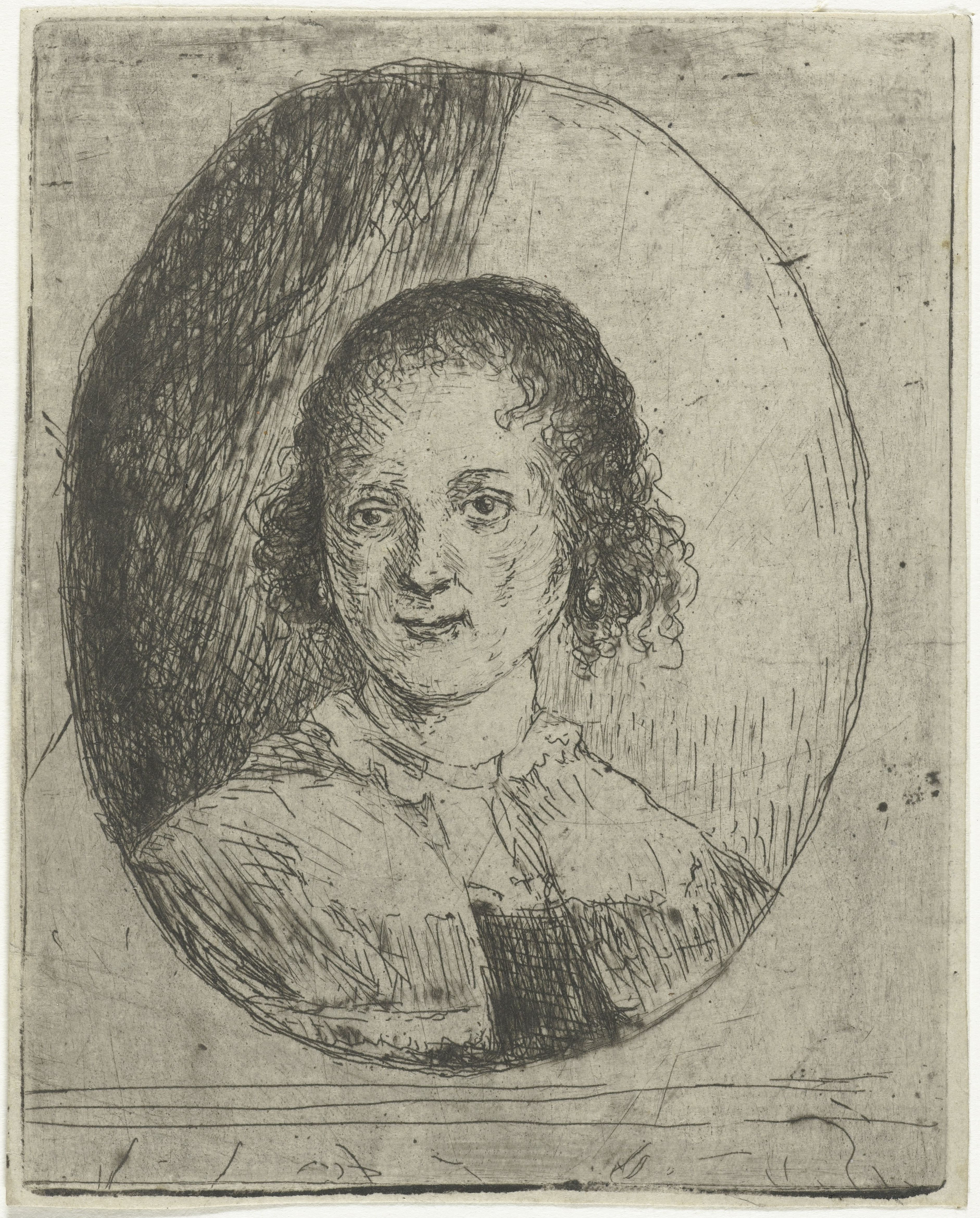
- Portrait of Christine by her brother Jan Chalon
- Born: 25 May 1749; Amsterdam, Netherlands
- Died: 18 December 1808 (aged 59); Hazerswoude, Netherlands
- Known for: Painting
- Spouse: Christiaan Frederik Rüppe (m. 1784)

Christina Chalon (25 May 1748 – 18 December 1808) was a Dutch artist.

Chalon was born in Amsterdam, and studied painting under Sara Troost and Ploos van Amstel. She, however, devoted herself more particularly to etching, in which she acquired great proficiency. She has left some thirty plates, for the most part in the style of Adriaen van Ostade. She died at Hazerswoude in 1808 and was buried in Leiden. Her etchings are marked with Chr^{a} Cha., or Chr^{a} Chal., or else CC. Amongst the best may be noticed:

- An Interior, with three Boors.
- A Mother taking three children to School.
- An Old Woman saluting a peasant Boy.
