= Jacobus Buys =

Dutch painter and engraver

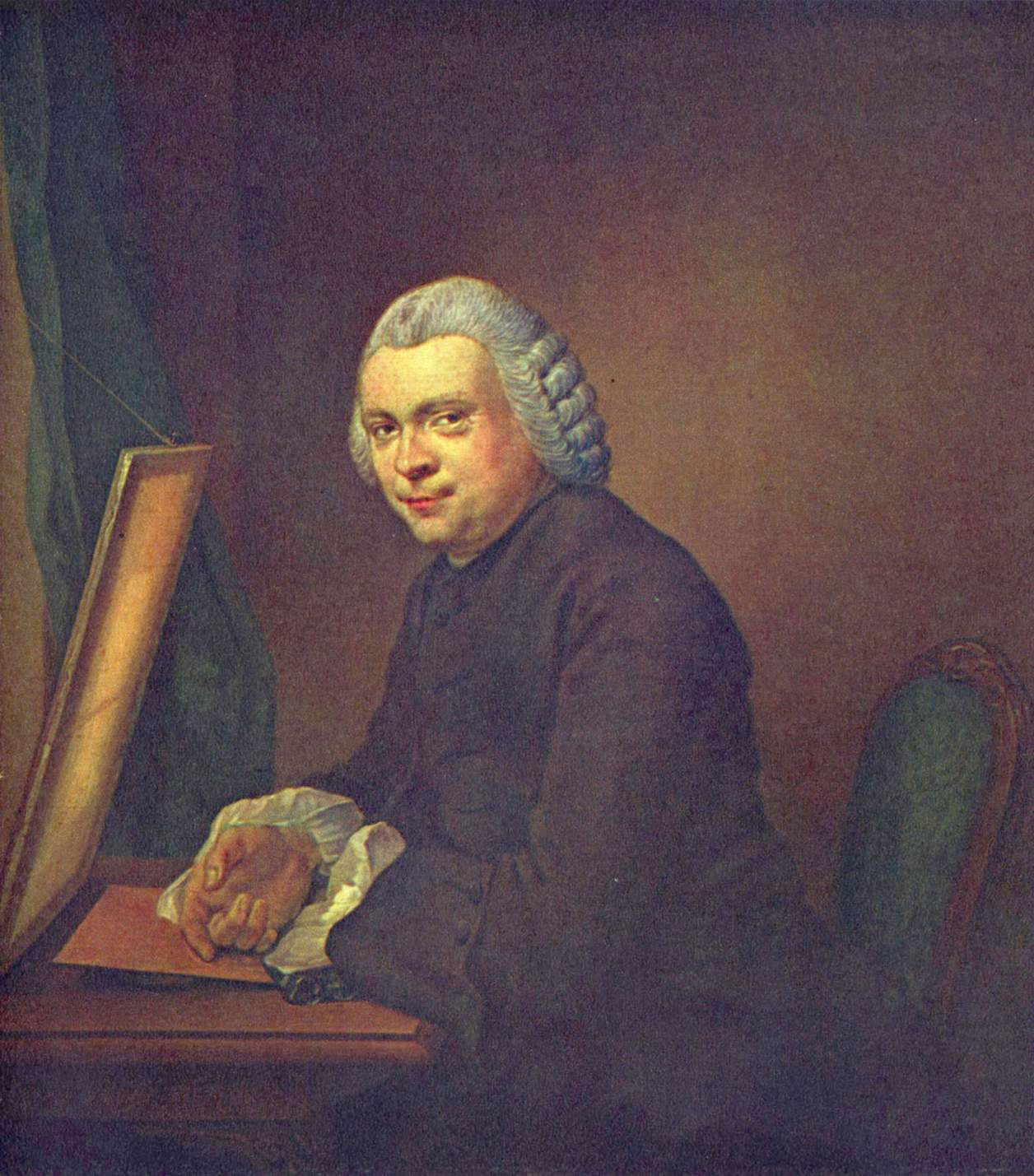
Portrait of Cornelis Ploos van Amstel, Dutch art collector, 1766, Rijksmuseum Amsterdam

Jacobus Buys (19 November 1724 – 7 April 1801) was a Dutch painter and engraver.

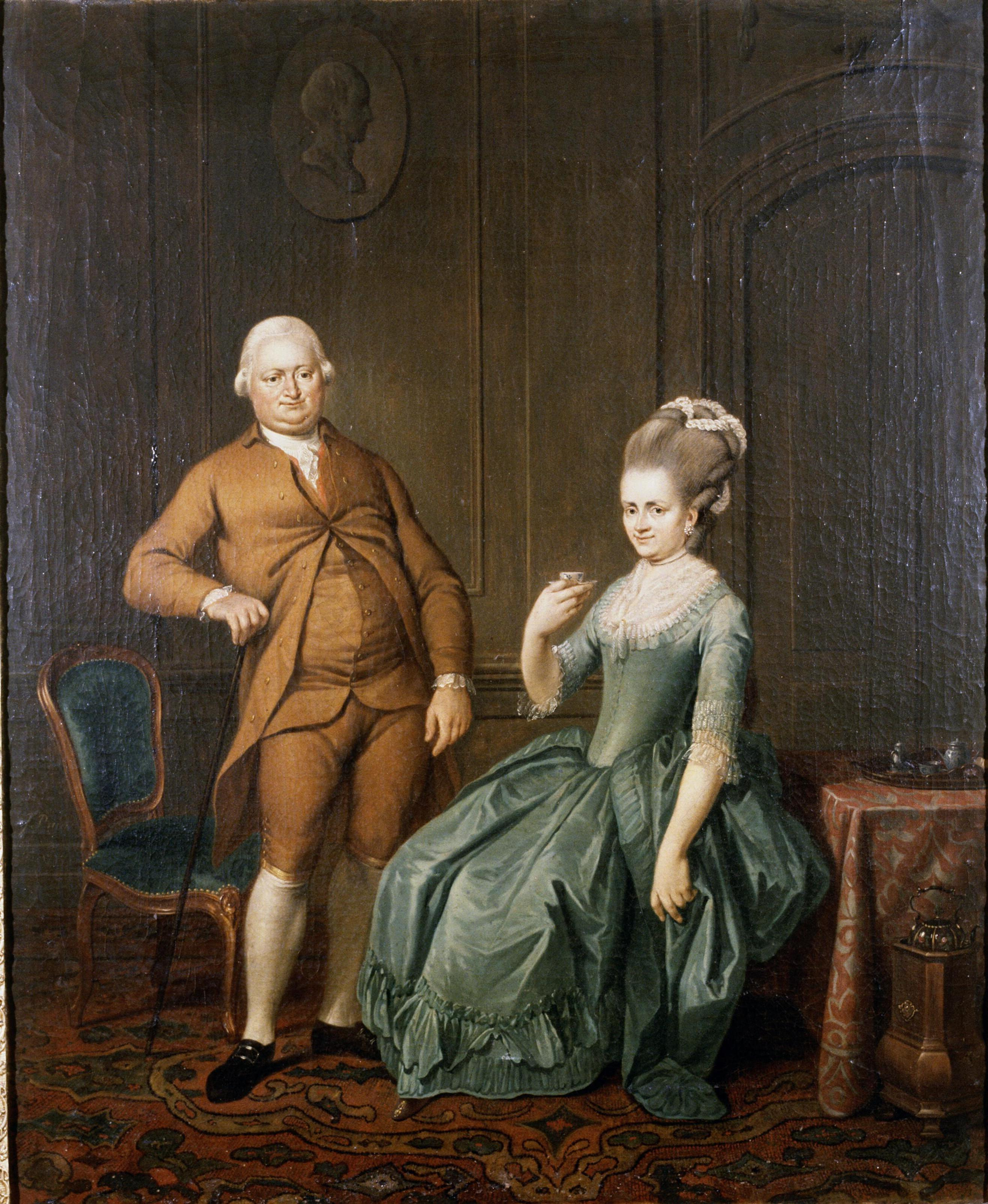
Portrait of industrialist Jan Modderman and his wife, 1777

Buys was born in Amsterdam the son of a wig-maker. He studied under Cornelis Pronk, Jacob de Wit, and Cornelis Troost, and ultimately became director of the Amsterdam Drawing Academy. He painted portraits, designed bas-reliefs, tapestry, and book-illustrations, and made copies of the works of the best masters of the seventeenth century. Buys became a member of Amsterdam's Guild of St Luke in 1750, and died in 1801.
