= Bernard Picart =

French engraver (1673–1733)

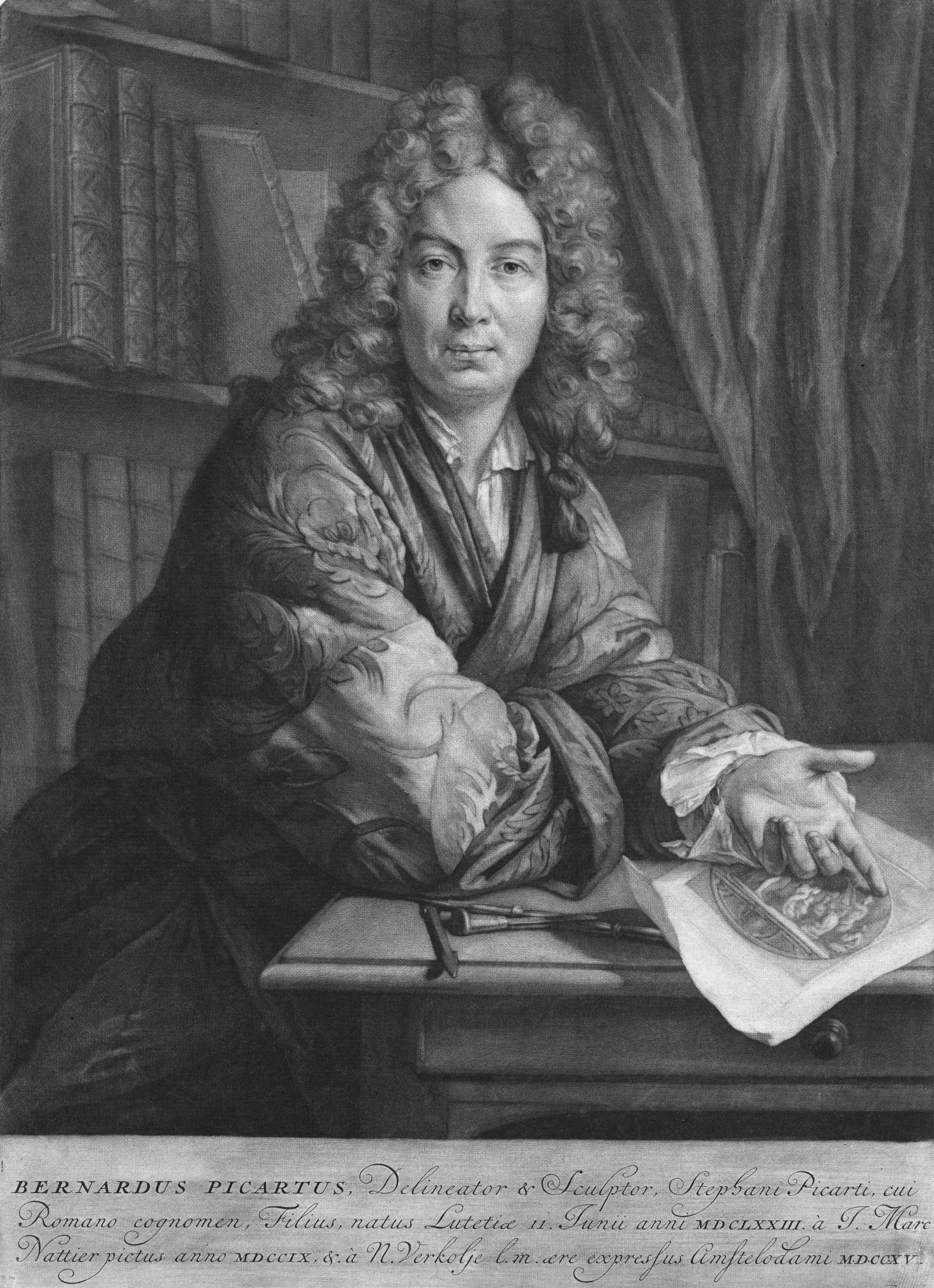
Bernard Picart (mezzotint by Nicolaas Verkolje after Jean-Marc Nattier, 1715)

Bernard Picart or Picard (11 June 1673 – 8 May 1733), was a French draughtsman, engraver, and book illustrator in Amsterdam, who showed an interest in cultural and religious habits.

== Life ==
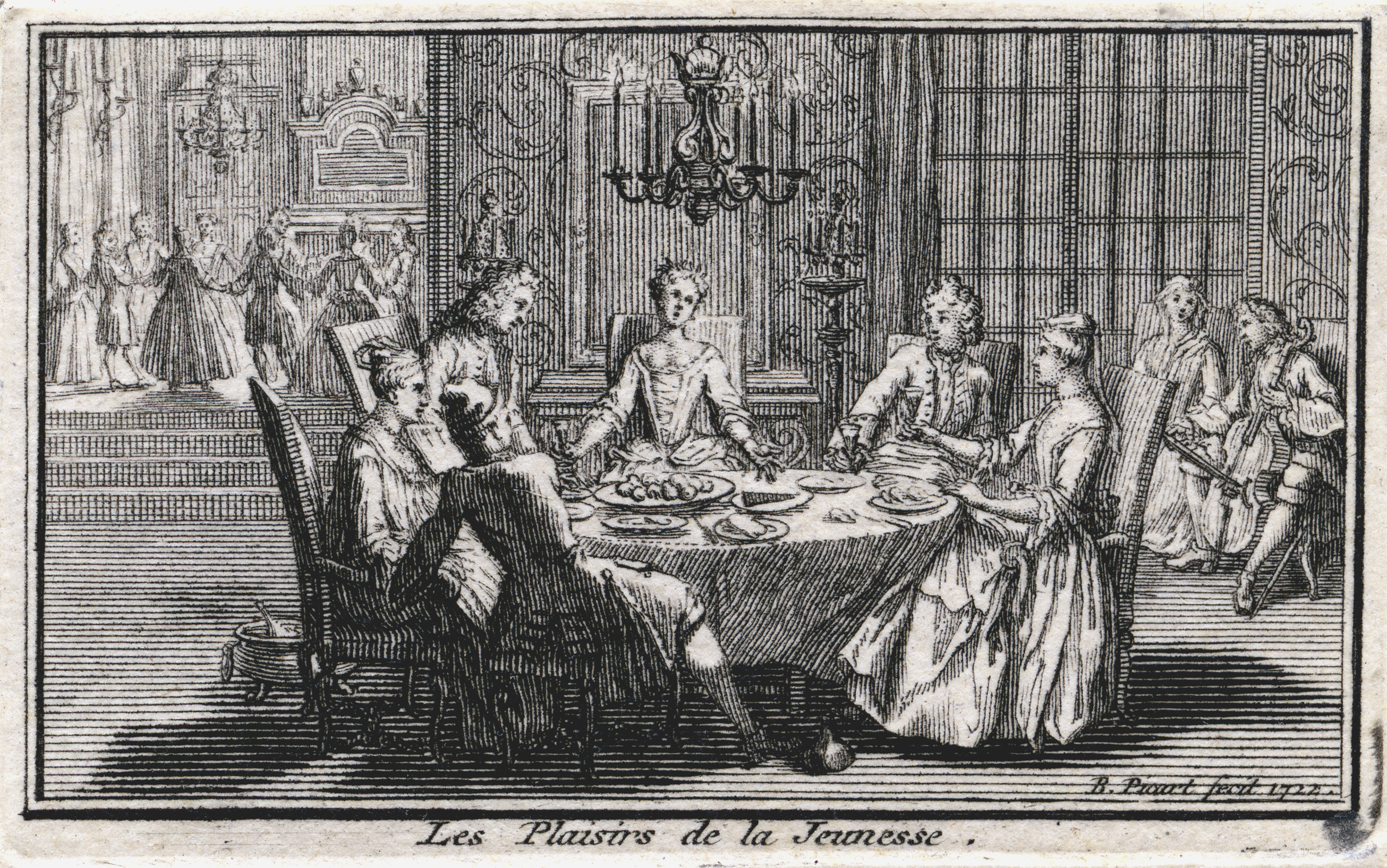
Les Plaisirs de la Jeunesse

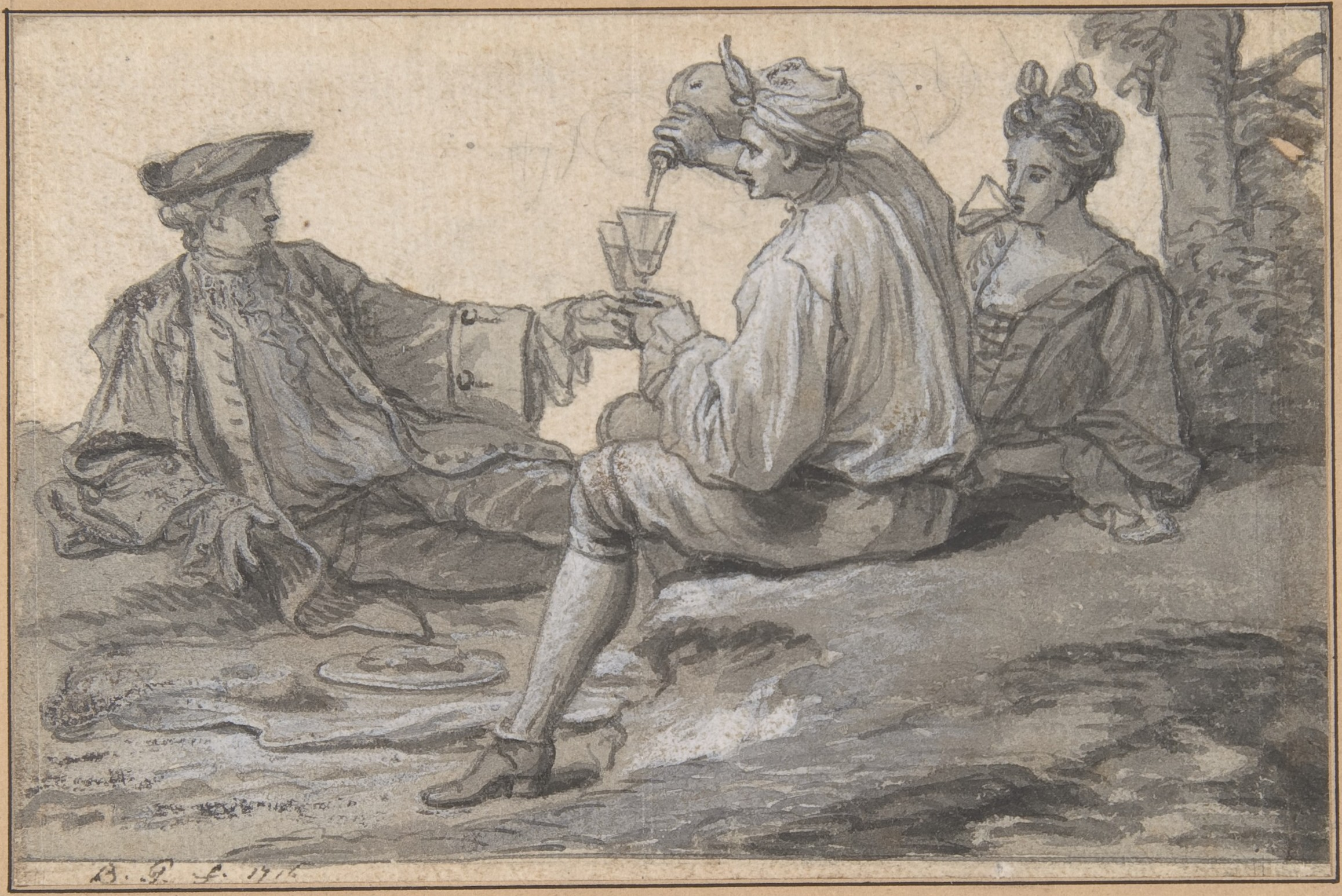
A Picnic Party

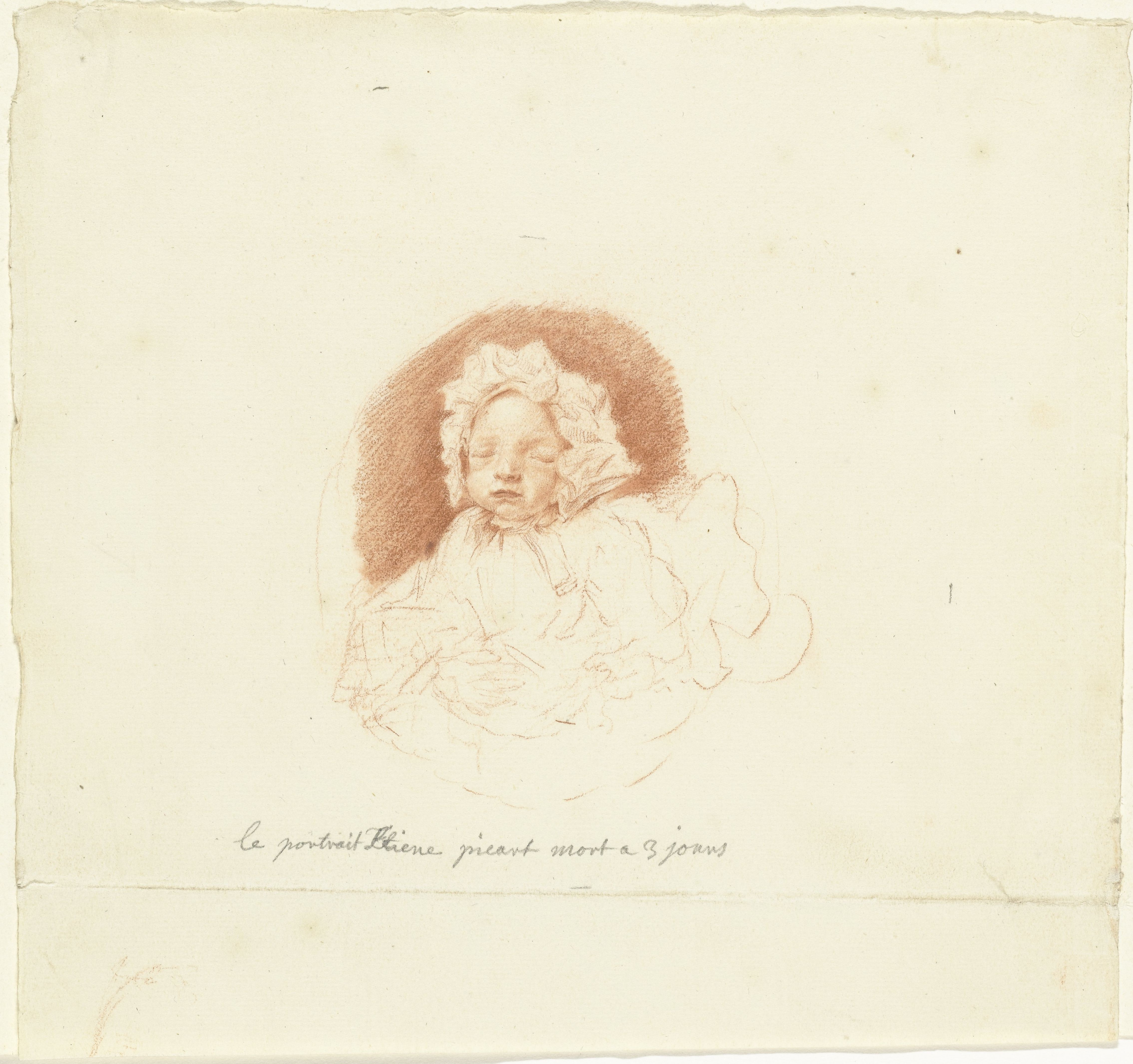
Portrait of Estienne Picart, who died after three days

Picart was born in rue Saint-Jacques, Paris as son of Etienne Picart, a famous engraver. In 1689, he studied drawing and architecture at the Académie royale de peinture et de sculpture. He was taught by Charles le Brun, along with Benoît Audran the Elder, Sébastien Leclerc and Antoine Coypel. In 1696 he wintered in Antwerp, where he was well received. He stayed in Amsterdam for more than a year and had commissions before returning to France at the end of 1698. He took over his father's workshop. From 1702 on, he was editor of playwrights written by himself or the other members of Nil volentibus arduum.

After his wife, Cloudina Pros, the daughter of a bookseller, and their children died, he settled in The Hague together with Prosper Marchand in January 1710. There Picart, Marchand and Charles Levier belonged to a "radical Huguenot coterie", who studied the works of John Locke, which promoted the separation of church and state. (Note: The bookshop in the Hague was called L'Étoile.) They joined the Walloon church but were influenced by Jean Claude and Pierre Bayle who both fled to the Dutch Republic in earlier years. Picart accepted a commission to draw prints for the Bible. He and Marchand moved to Amsterdam in 1711 (later being joined by his father Étienne Picart (le Romain).

=== Amsterdam ===
In April 1712 he married Anna Vincent (1684–1736) in Haarlem, the marriage was assisted by her father Ysbrand Vincent (1642–1718) who had initially disagreed with the marriage. Ysbrand was a rich paper seller, who moved to France but fled in 1686. Levinus Vincent became his uncle, a Mennonite who owned a cabinet of curiosities in Haarlem. Picart moved in with his father-in-law and designed several book frontispieces. Picart lived across the Old Lutheran Church but also close to a Mennonite Church. (Note: The house was owned by Mr Coenraad van Beuningen (1678-1744) a Mennonite; he and his sister lived next door.) In May 1713 the couple had male twins, who both died within a few weeks; he portrayed them both. Picart became a citizen, joined the guild and published a book about his teacher Charles Le Brun. His three daughters were baptized in Westerkerk. Picart may have had a better understanding of the Dutch language.

He collaborated with Cornelis de Bruyn on the frontispiece of Reizen over Moskovie, door Persie en Indie, published in 1718 as Voyages de Corneille le Brun par la Moscovie, en Perse, et aux Indes Occidentales. At some time Picart opened an engraving school. His pupils included Jacob Folkema, Jakob van der Schley (who portrayed him posthumously), Pieter Tanjé and François Morellon la Cave, who all used his drawings for engravings. According to RKD, Johann Philipp Endelich (?–1760) was also a pupil. In 1723/1726 Anna Yver, his mother-in-law and two of her children lived at Rokin; Picart may have used most floors for teaching drawing and engraving or storing paper. Picart was buried in the nearby Walloon Church, Amsterdam on 13 May 1733.

=== Collaboration ===
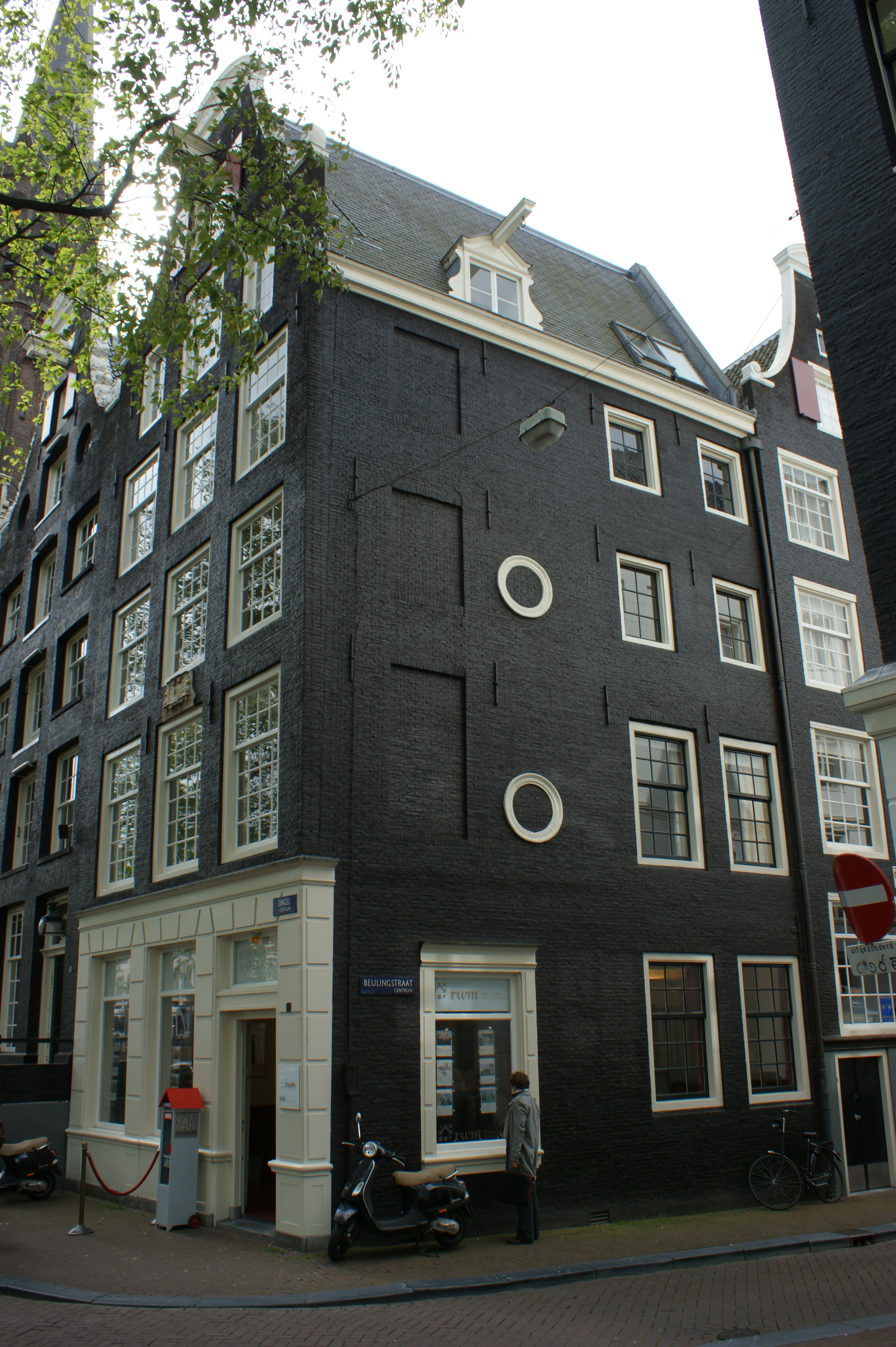
Singel 434, called "de drie Beulingen", rented out to Ysbrand Vincent and Bernard Picart.

In 1724, he worked with Philipp von Stosch, a Prussian antiquarian, whose Gemmæ Antiquæ Cælatæ (Pierres antiques graveés), Picart's engravings reproduced 70 antique carved hardstones such as onyx, jasper and carnelian from European collections, a volume of inestimable value to antiquarians and historians. His most famous work is Cérémonies et coutumes religieuses de tous les peuples du monde, appearing from 1723 to 1743 and in collaboration with Jean Frédéric Bernard, a successful author and publisher who promoted religious tolerance and gallicanism. Because of the many prints it also seems he sympathized with Jansenists, the Armenian Apostolic Church and Collegiants. In 1728 Les Césars de l'empereur Julien, traduits du grec par feu Mr. le Baron de Spanheim, avec des remarques & des preuves, enrichies de plus de 300 médailles, & autres anciens monumens, gravés par Bernard Picart le Romain was published. In 1729 he collaborated with Louis Fabricius Dubourg.

In 1731 he published a reprint originally by his father (Le Romain). After his death the widow ordered her three daughters to keep his collection of drawings together but sell the prints at an auction and the copperplates in Paris. In 1734 she published Impostures innocentes, ou recueil d'estampes d'après divers peintres illustres tels que Raphaël, Le Guide, Carlo Maratta, Le Poussin, Rembrandt, etc., gravées à leur imitation et selon le goût particulier de chacun d'eux, et accompagnées d'un discours sur les préjugés de certains curieux touchant la gravure, par Bernard Picart, dessinateur et graveur, avec son éloge historique et le catalogue de ses ouvrages, Veuve de Bernard Picart, Amsterdam. She published a book by Pierre Lebrun about superstition with his engravings: Superstitions anciennes et modernes, préjugés vulgaires qui ont induit les peuples à des usages et à des pratiques contraires à la religion, avec des figures qui représentent ces pratiques, chez Jean-Frédéric Bernard, Amsterdam, 1733-1736. His widow was buried in Nieuwe Kerk, Amsterdam. Her inventory (on 12 March 1736) mentioned around 400 portfolios with copperplates, books, drawings, paper, 54 paintings (not specified), jewellery and bonds. The website of the Rijksmuseum in Amsterdam has more than 2,000 works online by Bernard Picart.

== Works ==
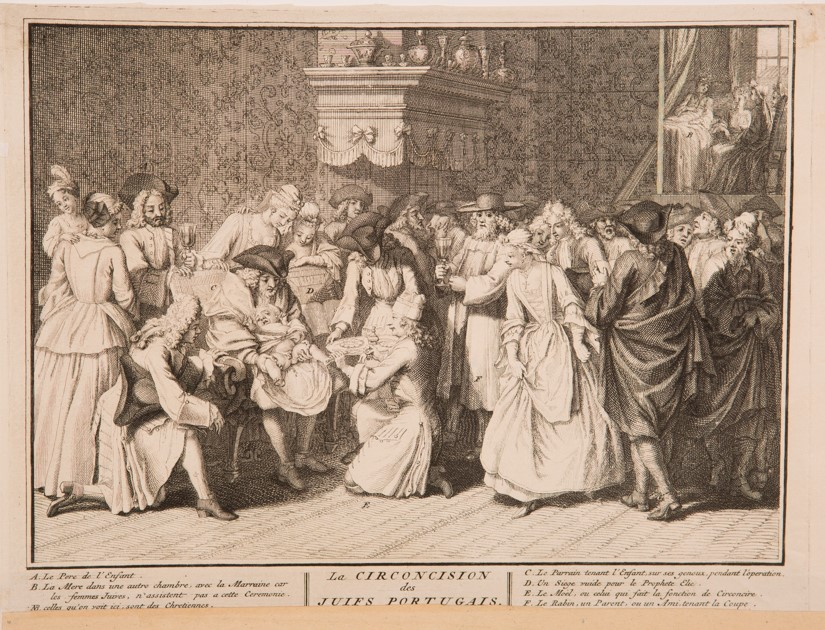
The Circumcision of the Portuguese Jews and the Redemption of the Firstborn,1722, in the collection of the Jewish Museum of Switzerland.

Most of his work was book-illustrations, for which he collaborated with local artists like Gerard Hoet and Arnold Houbraken. The illustrations were used in various publications including the Figures de la Bible (1720) and the Taferelen der voornaamste geschiedenissen van het Oude en Nieuwe Testament (1728). The latter was a picture bible comprising 214 large engravings of which Gilliam van der Gouwen had engraved 41. From 1720 Picart collaborated on the Cérémonies with the son of a Protestant minister Jean-Frédéric Bernard, with a commitment to religious toleration. Jonathan I. Israel calls Cérémonies "an immense effort to record the religious rituals and beliefs of the world in all their diversity as objectively and authentically as possible".

They put religion in comparative perspective, offering images and analysis of Jews, Catholics, Hindus, Muslims, the peoples of the Orient and the Americas, Protestants, deists, freemasons, and assorted sects. Despite condemnation by the Catholic Church, the work was a resounding success. For the next century it was copied or adapted, but without the context of its original radicalism and its debt to clandestine literature, English deists, and the philosophy of Spinoza.

Although Picart had never left Europe, he relied on accounts by those who had and had access to a collection of Indian sculpture. The original French edition of Cérémonies comprises ten volumes of text and 266 engravings.

=== "Cérémonies" engravings ===
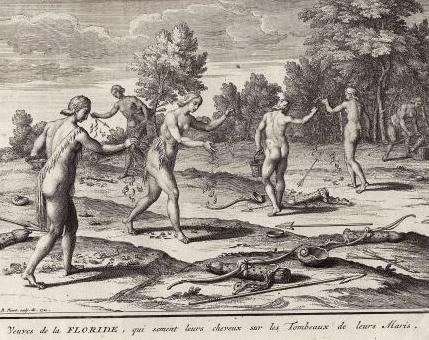
One of six copper plate engravings by Bernard Picart depicting Florida Indians (of 30 engravings total). Volume One of "Cérémonies et Coutumes Religieuses de tous les Peuples du Monde" (Private Collection, St. Augustine Beach)

- Vol. 1 – 30 engravings (1727)
- Vol. 2 – 33 engravings (1727)
- Vol. 3 – 19 engravings (1728)
- Vol. 4 – 14 engravings (1729)
- Vol. 5 – 26 engravings (1736)
- Vol. 6 – 45 engravings (1738)
- Vol. 7 – 58 engravings
- Vol. 8 – 5 engravings
- Vol. 9 – 24 engravings
- Vol. 10 – 12 engravings

=== The Temple of the Muses ===
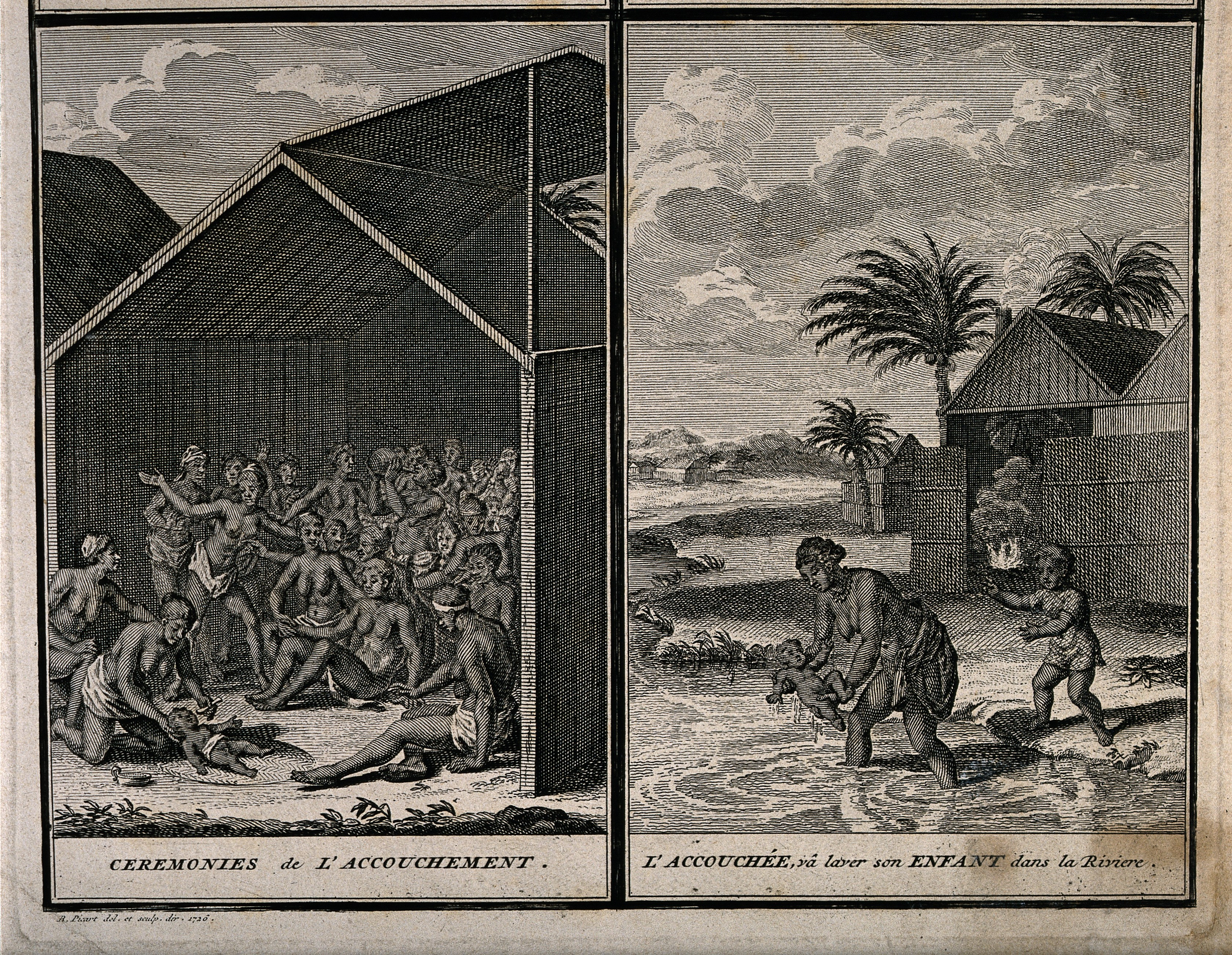
A celebration of the birth of a child (left). The child's first bath (right). 1726

This was an illustrated book of Ovid's Metamorphoses more popular fables published in 1733 in Dutch (Tempel der zanggodinnen, vertoond in LX heerlijke kunststukken, behelzende alle de voornaemste geschiedenissen van de Fabel-Oudheid), in 1738 in English (The Temple of the Muses, or, the principal histories of fabulous antiquity), and in 1742 in French (Le Temple des Muses, orné de LX tableaux où sont représentés les événemens les plus remarquables de l'antiquité fabuleuse), by Zacharias Chatelain. The engravings had captions in French, English, German, and Dutch. The artists involved were Michel de Marolles, Bernard Picart, Jacques Favereau, Abraham van Diepenbeeck, and Cornelis Bloemaert. A facsimile of the Dutch version was published in 1968.

== Bibliography ==
- Baskind, Samantha, “Judging a Book by its Cover: Bernard Picart's Jews and Art History,” Journal of Modern Jewish Studies 15, no. 1 (March 2015): 1-23.
- Baskind, Samantha, “Bernard Picart’s Etchings of Amsterdam’s Jews,” Jewish Social Studies 13, no. 2 (Winter 2007): 40–64.
- Grafton, Anthony. "A Jewel of a Thousand Facets." New York Review of Books (June 10, 2010) Vol. LVII, number 11. Page 38–40. Online summary
- Hunt, Lynn; Jacob, Margaret; and Mijnhardt, Wijnand (2010). The Book That Changed Europe: Picart and Bernard's Religious Ceremonies of the World. Cambridge, MA etc.: Harvard University Press. ISBN 978-0-674-04928-4. LCCN 2009-48372. OCLC 904748595 – via the Internet Archive.
- Hunt, Lynn and Margaret Jacob and Wijnand Mijnhardt (2010). Bernard Picart and the First Global Vision of Religion, Los Angeles: Getty Research Institute.Bernard Picart and the First Global Vision of Religion
- Wyss-Giacosa, Paola von (2006). Religionsbilder der frühen Aufklärung : Bernard Picarts Tafeln für die Cérémonies et coutumes religieuses de tous les peuples du monde. Wabern (Switzerland): Benteli, 2006. OCLC 65207871 See also Margaret Jacob, 'The Radical Enlightenment' (London:George Allen & Unwin, 1981).
- Israel, Jonathan I. (2001) Radical enlightenment: philosophy and the making of modernity, 1650–1750. Oxford University Press. OCLC 44425436
- Jacob, Margaret (2005) Bernard Picart and the Turn to Modernity, De Achttiende eeuw, vol. 37, 2005, pp. 1–16.

== Gallery ==
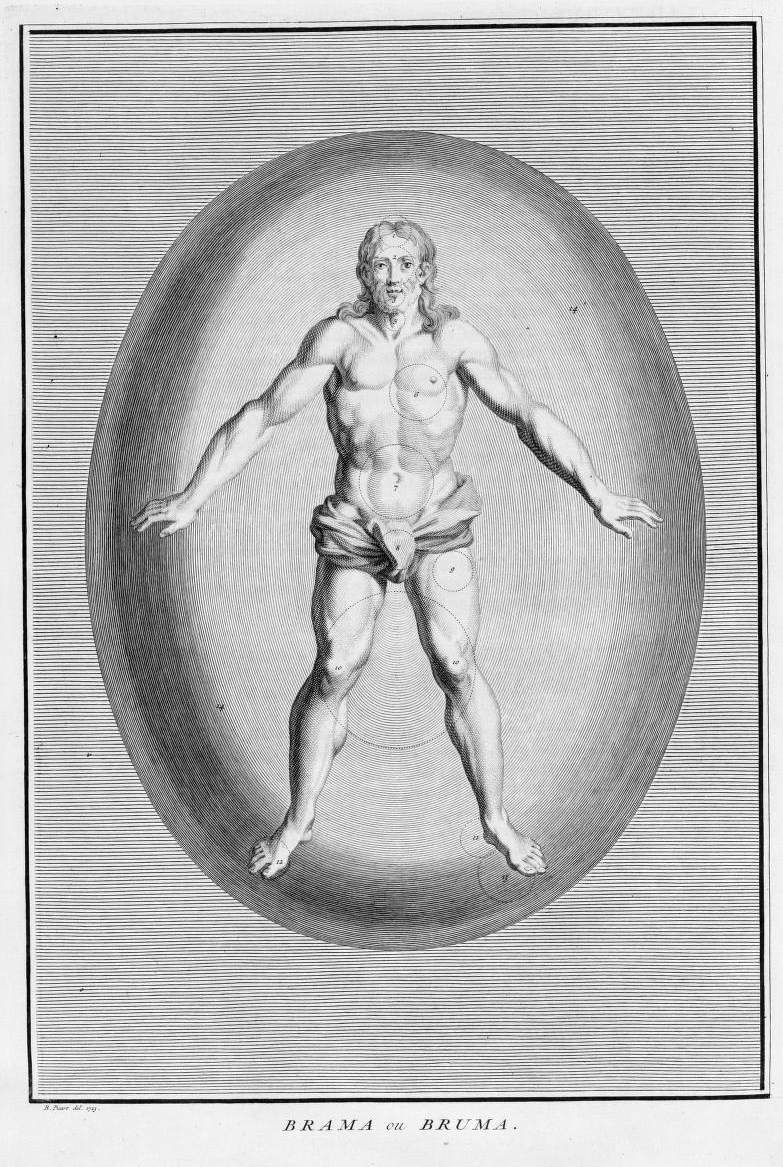
Brahma - Cérémonies & Coutumes Religieuses de tous les Peuples du Monde, 1723

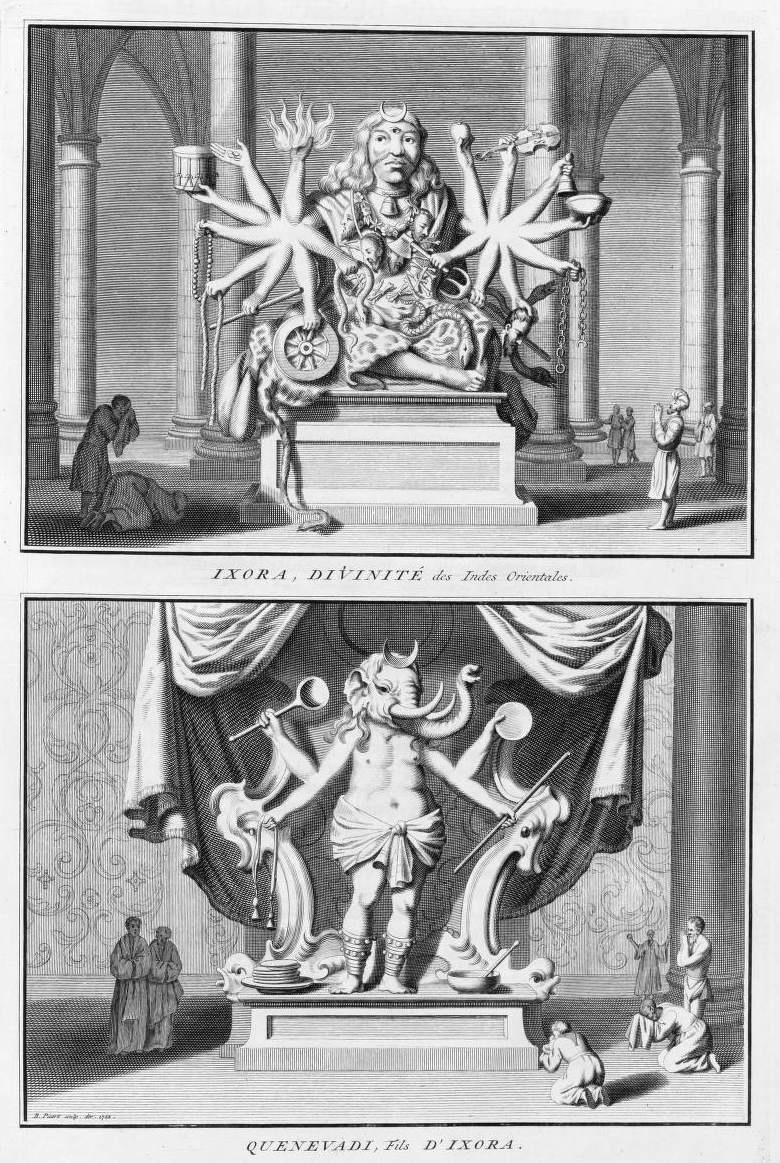
Shiva & Ganesha - Cérémonies & Coutumes Religieuses de tous les Peuples du Monde, 1723

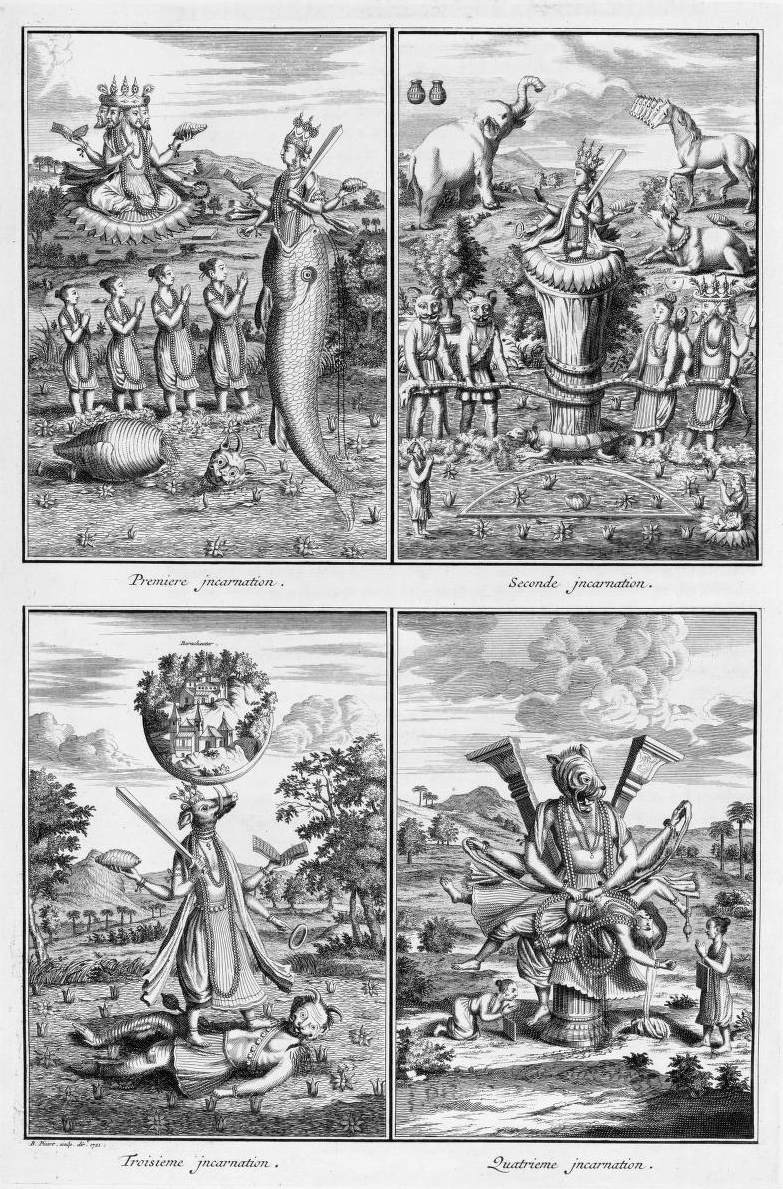
Matsya, Kurma, Varaha & Narasimha (avatars of Vishnu) - Cérémonies & Coutumes Religieuses de tous les Peuples du Monde, 1723

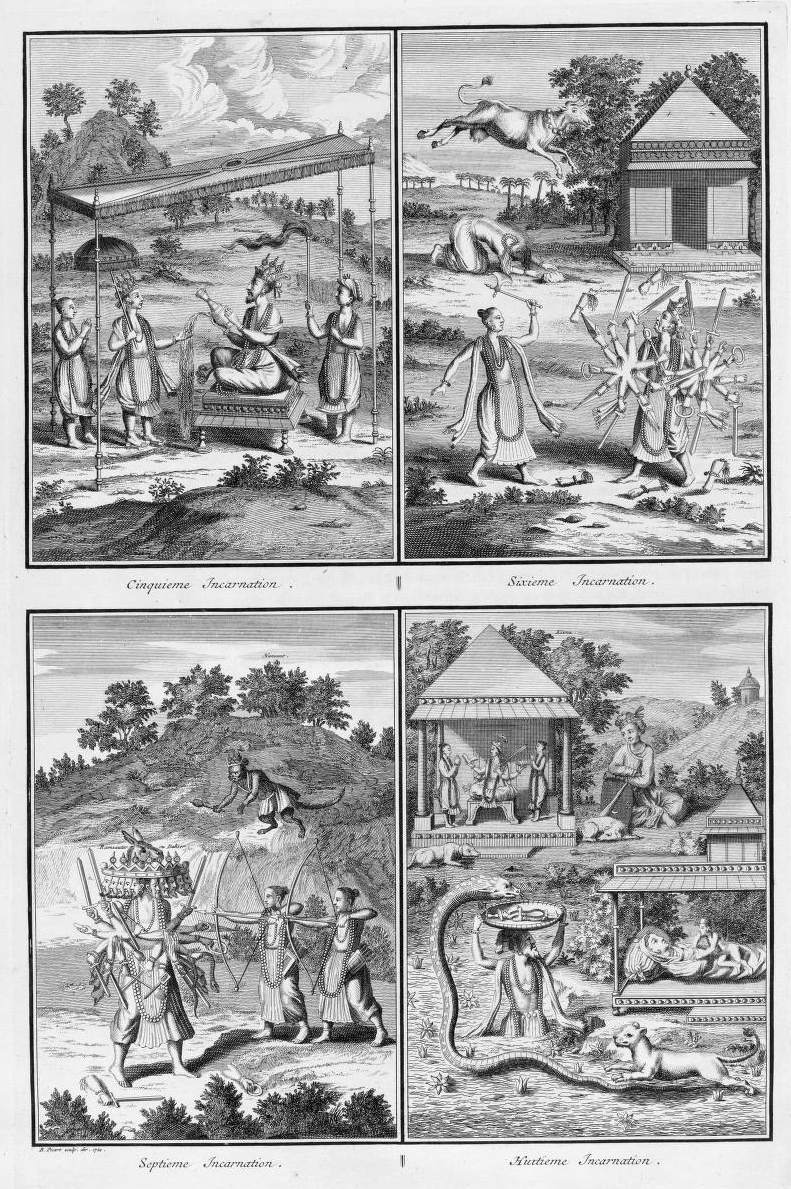
Vamana, Parashurama, Rama & Krishna (avatars of Vishnu) - Cérémonies & Coutumes Religieuses de tous les Peuples du Monde, 1723

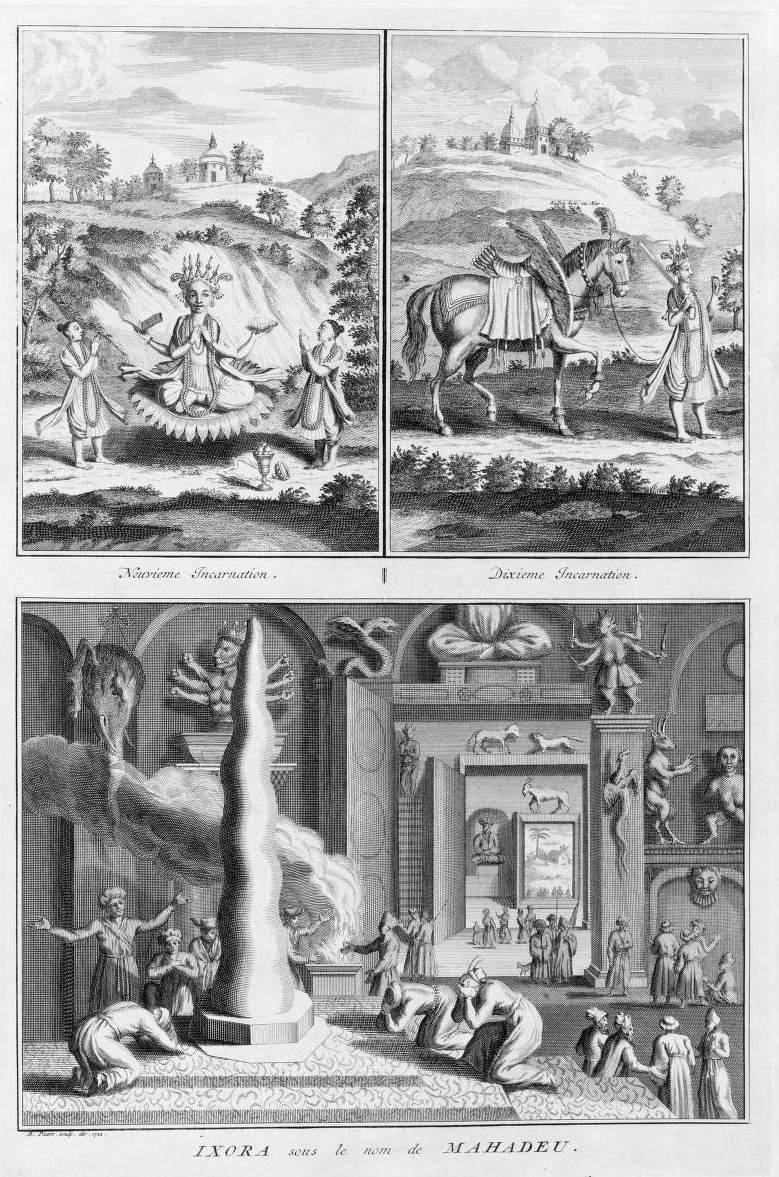
Buddha & Kalki (avatars of Vishnu) & Shiva (Mahadeva) - Cérémonies & Coutumes Religieuses de tous les Peuples du Monde, 1723

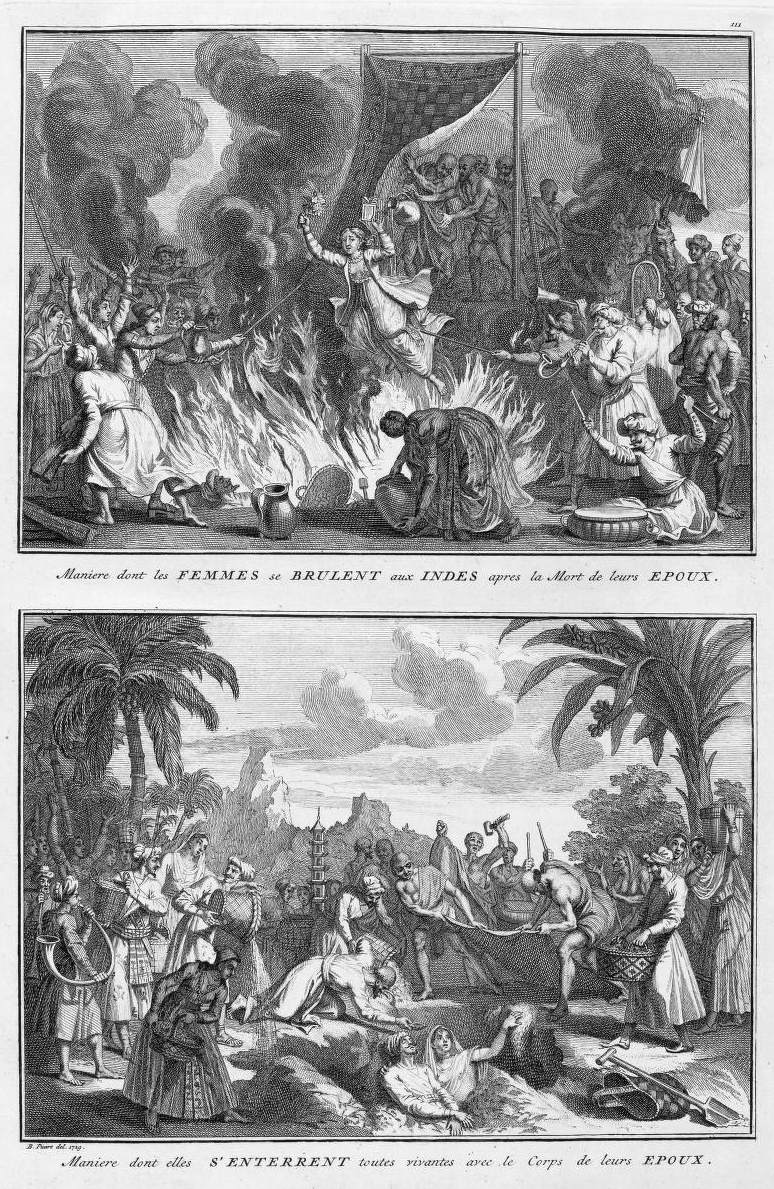
Sati, when a widow joins her dead husband in death - Cérémonies & Coutumes Religieuses de tous les Peuples du Monde, 1723

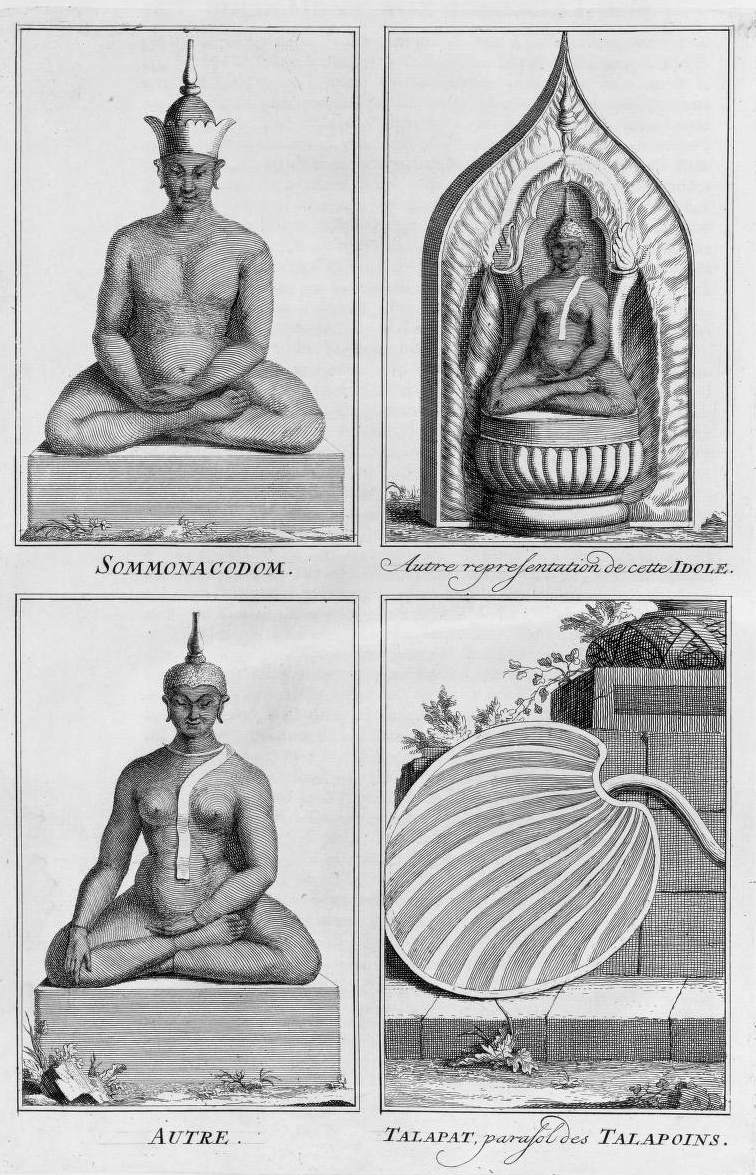
Statues of Buddha in Thailand - Cérémonies & Coutumes Religieuses de tous les Peuples du Monde, 1723
