= Cornelis Ploos van Amstel =

Dutch painter

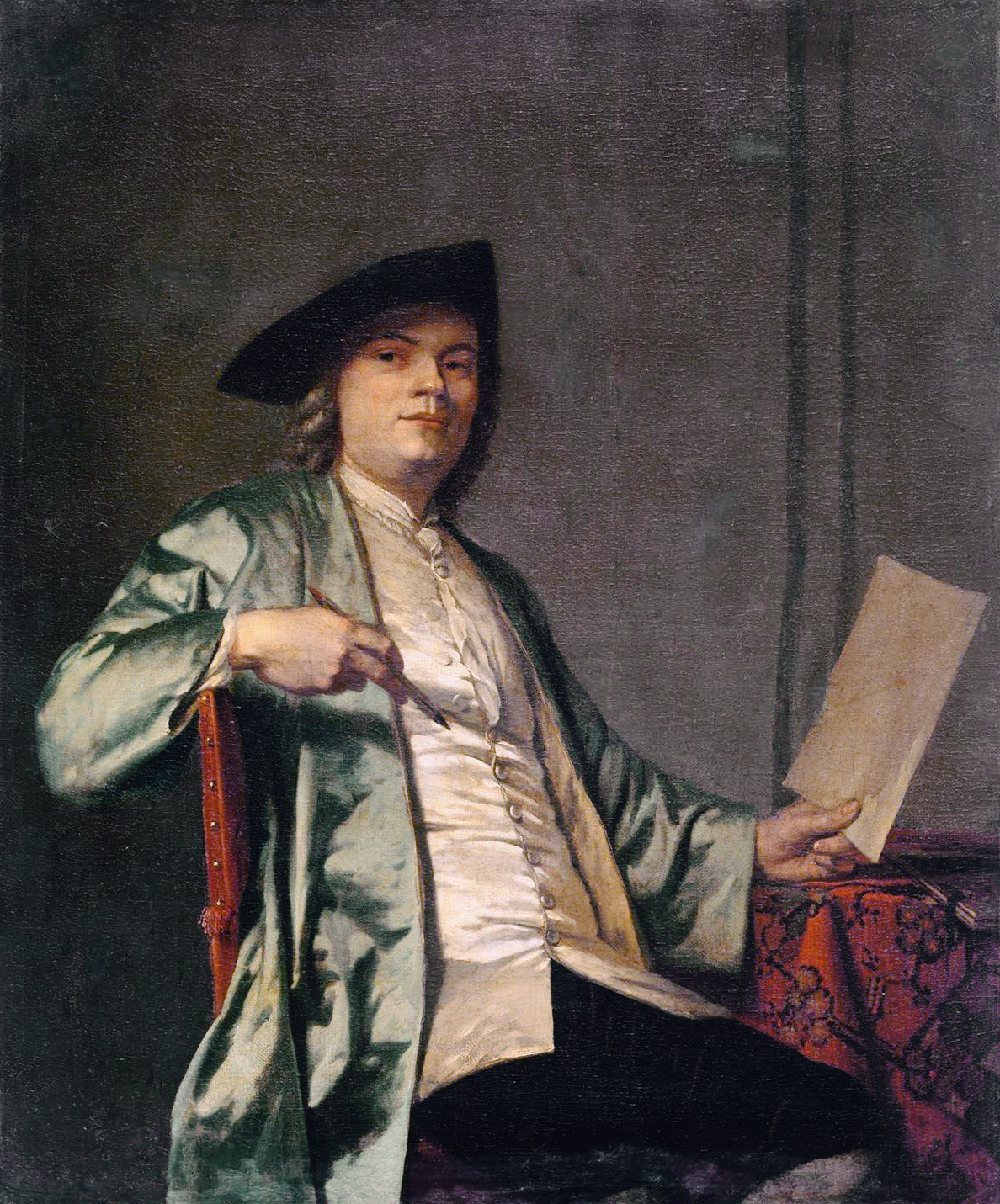
Portrait of Cornelis Ploos van Amstel, by George van der Mijn, c.1758

Cornelis Ploos van Amstel (1726–1798) was an eighteenth-century Dutch painter and art collector.

== Biography ==
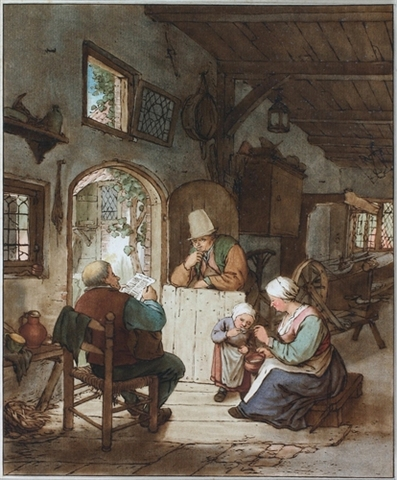
Etching with colored pencil by Ploos van Amstel, after Adriaen van Ostade, ca. 1765–1782, collection Teylers Museum

He was born in Weesp. According to the RKD, he was a pupil of Norbert van Bloemen and Jacobus Buys, and later became a member of the Amsterdam artist society Arte et Amicitia (De Kunstkrans). He is mostly known as a collector and copyist of 17th-century artists. He married dressmaker Elisabeth Troost, the daughter of Susanna Maria van der Duyn and Cornelis Troost. His pupils were Christina Chalon, William V, Prince of Orange, Elisabeth van Woensel, and Hermanus Petrus Schouten. He died in Amsterdam in 1798.

According to Van der Aa he kept an art cabinet with over 5,000 drawings, including many by Rembrandt. In 1800 his collection was auctioned (without the Rembrandts, which were auctioned later) for the enormous sum of 109,406 guilders.

== Works ==
He was not only a patron of the arts, he was also active as a teacher and writer of instructional materials. He attended lectures at the Athenaeum Illustre of Amsterdam and wrote the original report of the lectures of Petrus Camper on the facial angle. Together with Reinier Vinkeles, Jacob Houbraken, Jan de Beijer, and Caspar Jacobsz Philips, he illustrated a new atlas of Amsterdam. Together with Jacob van der Schley, he made a catalog of the art in the Amsterdam City Hall, with short biographical sketches of all the artists involved.

He invented a copying technique that could accurately reproduce images made by pencil, chalk or watercolour washes. Ploos identified these copies by a small stamp of his family coat of arms on the back of each print.
