= Pieter Tanjé =

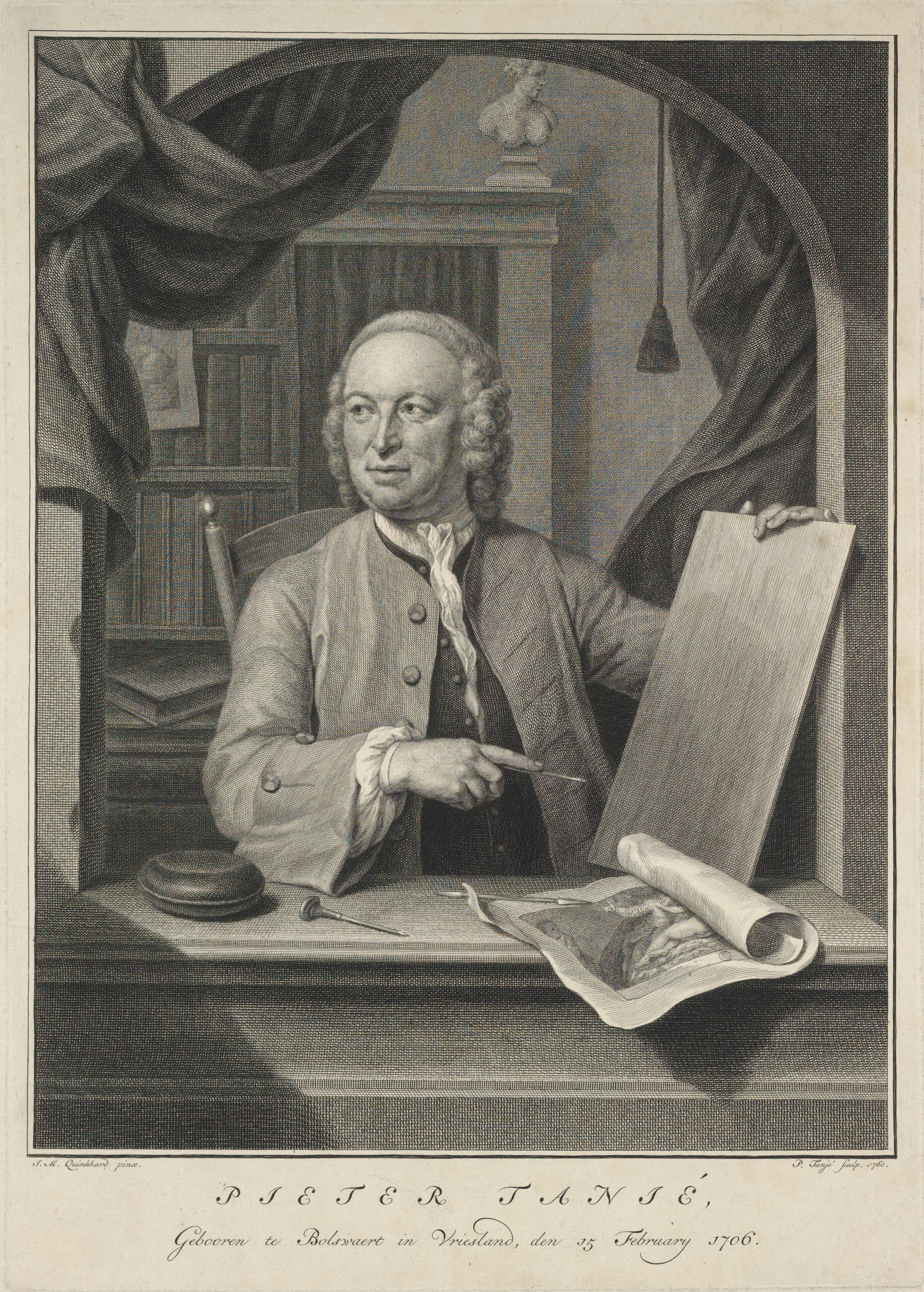
Self-portrait (1760)

Pieter Tanjé (1706–1761) was an 18th-century engraver from the Dutch Republic.

== Biography ==
Tanjé was born in Bolsward. According to the RKD he was a shipmate for the shipping service between Bolsward and Amsterdam who engraved designs for snuff boxes in his free time. He was so successful with his snuff boxes that Jacob Folkema encouraged him to enroll at the Amsterdam Stadsacademie, which he did at the age of 24 and became the pupil of Bernard Picart, Jacob Houbraken, Cornelis Troost, and Jacob de Wit. He engraved over 100 plates for Johan van Gool's book of artist biographies called Nieuw Schouburg in 1750, working mostly from portrait sketches by Aart Schouman. He died in Amsterdam.
