= Anna Folkema =

Dutch artist (1695–1768)

- Born: May 22, 1695; Dokkum, Netherlands
- Died: October 18, 1768 (aged 73); Amsterdam, Netherlands
- Known for: Engraving

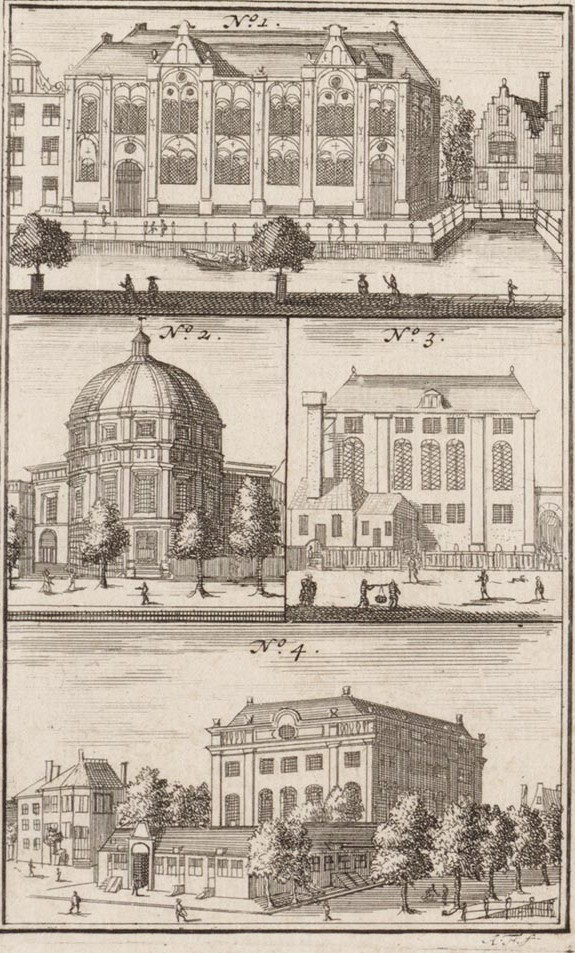
Two Lutheran churches and two Synagogues of Amsterdam

Anna Folkema (22 May 1695 – 8 October 1768), was an 18th-century engraver from the Dutch Republic.

== Biography ==
Folkema was born in Dokkum as the daughter of Johann Jakob Folkema, a goldsmith. She was the sister of Jacob Folkema. Their father moved the family to Amsterdam, where they ran a family business of making prints.

She died in Amsterdam.

== Selected works ==
- Two children drinking out of a bowl. Folkema Anna 1748. Line.
- Two children and a cat lying on a grassy bank. Folkema Anna 1748. Line.
