= Cornelis Troost =

Dutch actor and painter (1696–1750)

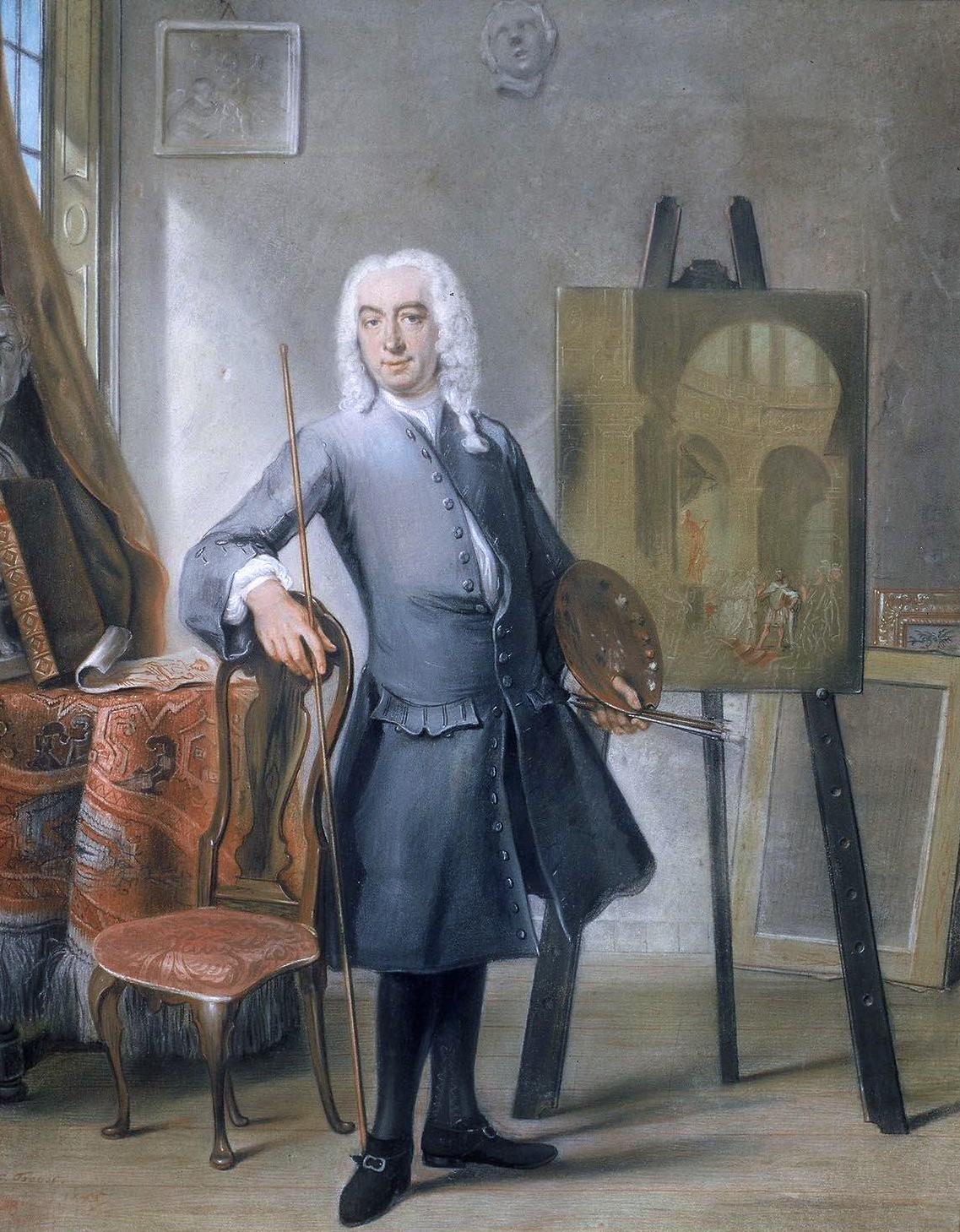
Self portrait, 1745

Cornelis Troost (8 October 1696 – 7 March 1750) was a Dutch actor and painter from Amsterdam.

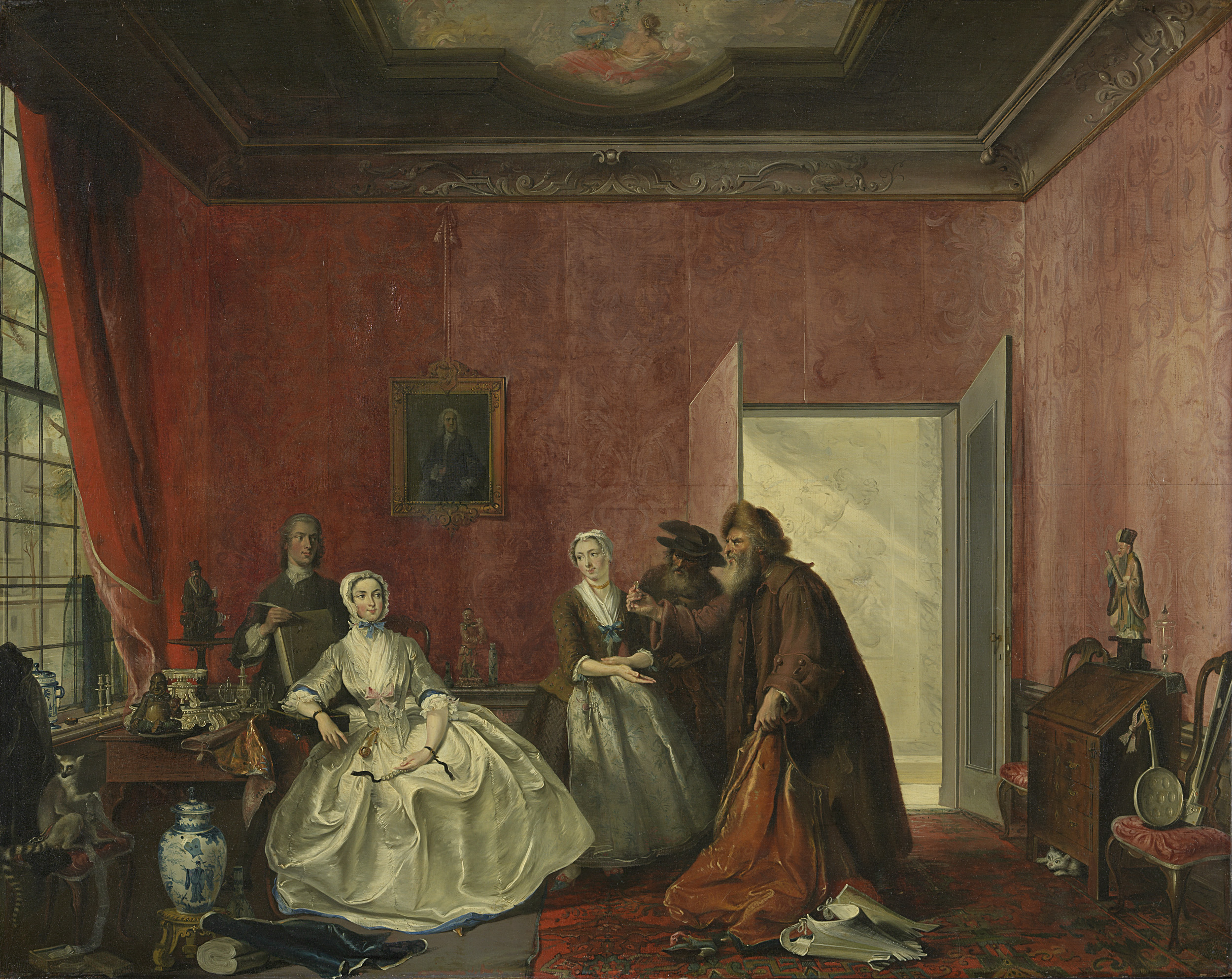
The Spendthrift or The Wasteful Woman

Troost was trained as an actor and married the actress Susanna Maria van der Duyn, but became a pupil of Arnold Boonen and gave up his career for painting in 1723.

He is primarily remembered for his works depicting scenes from the Amsterdam Theatre (he also made theatre decorations for plays) and daily life of the upper crust in Amsterdam. One of his earliest drawings dated 1708, is of Prince Eugene of Savoy and the bookseller and spy Louis Renard visiting a chic Amsterdam brothel. Then he had an early success with a lively group portrait depicting the Amsterdam Inspectors of the Collegium Medicum (Rijksmuseum, Amsterdam, 1724). Troost painted portraits, including one of Herman Boerhaave, the famous doctor from Leiden. Troost is known for his paintings of actors in famous roles as well as his witty and elegant Rococo genre scenes. Troost was possibly influenced by William Hogarth, and certainly by French artists such as Watteau, Boucher and Lancret.

His 1736 painting Jeronimus Tonneman and his Son shows the art collector seated in his parlour. He lived on the Keizersgracht, and collected Troost's paintings. It is assumed the book on the table is by Karel van Mander and on the chimney breast Argus and Mercury can be seen. Troost himself lived nearby on the banks of the river Amstel and at Prinsengracht.

A famous work, in his favorite medium of pastel and watercolor, is a five picture series entitled NELRI (Mauritshuis, The Hague, 1740). The name is derived from the first letters of the Latin inscriptions which accompany five views of the activities of a group of men during a night of reunion. The inscriptions on the NELRI paintings are:

- Nemo loquebantur (No one spoke)
- Erat sermo inter fratres (The brothers conversed)
- Loquebantur omnes (Everyone spoke)
- Rumor erat in casa (There was commotion in the house)
- Ibant qui poterant, qui non potuere cadebant (Those who could, went. Those who could not, fell over)
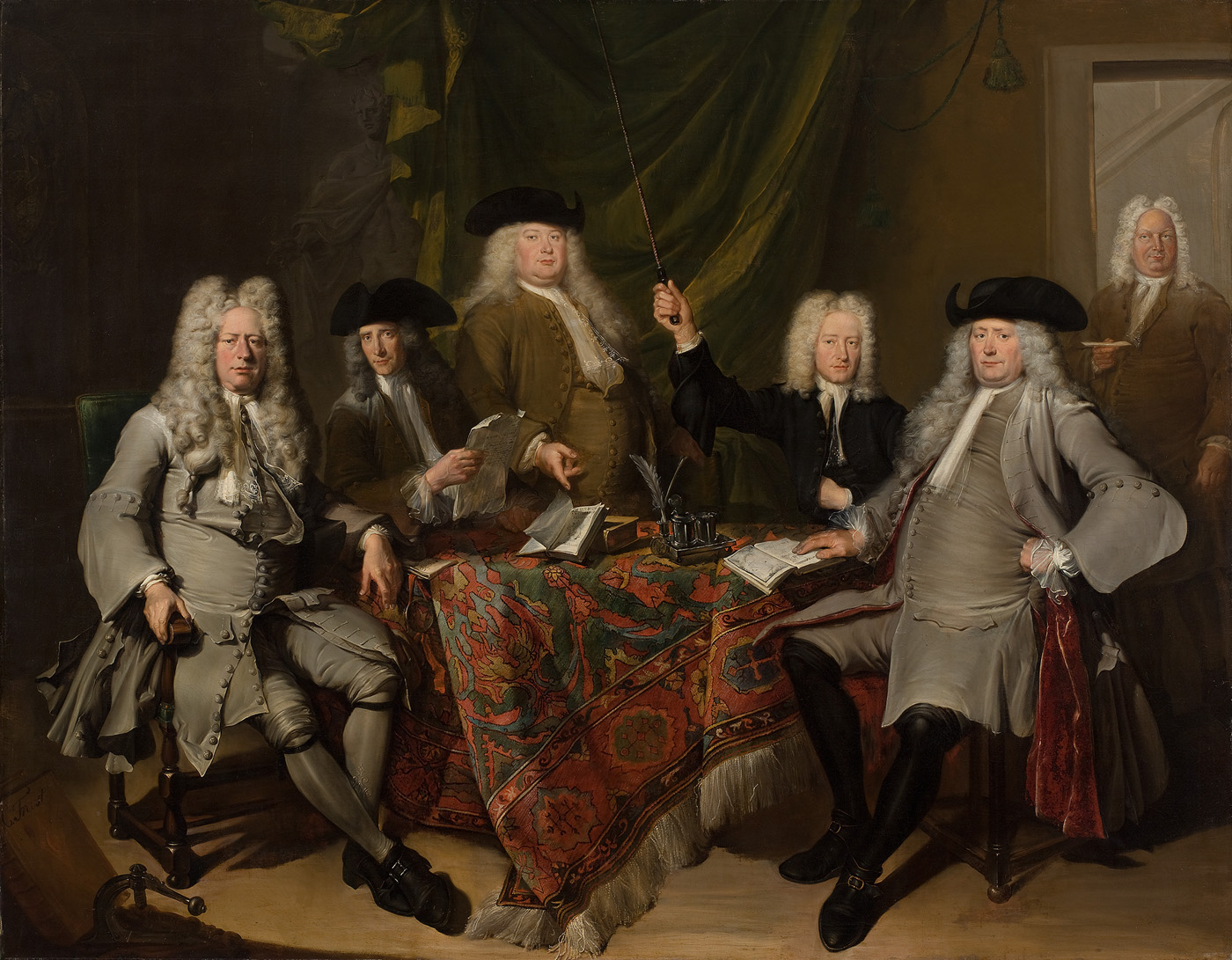
The inspectors of the Collegium Medicum in Amsterdam, 1724

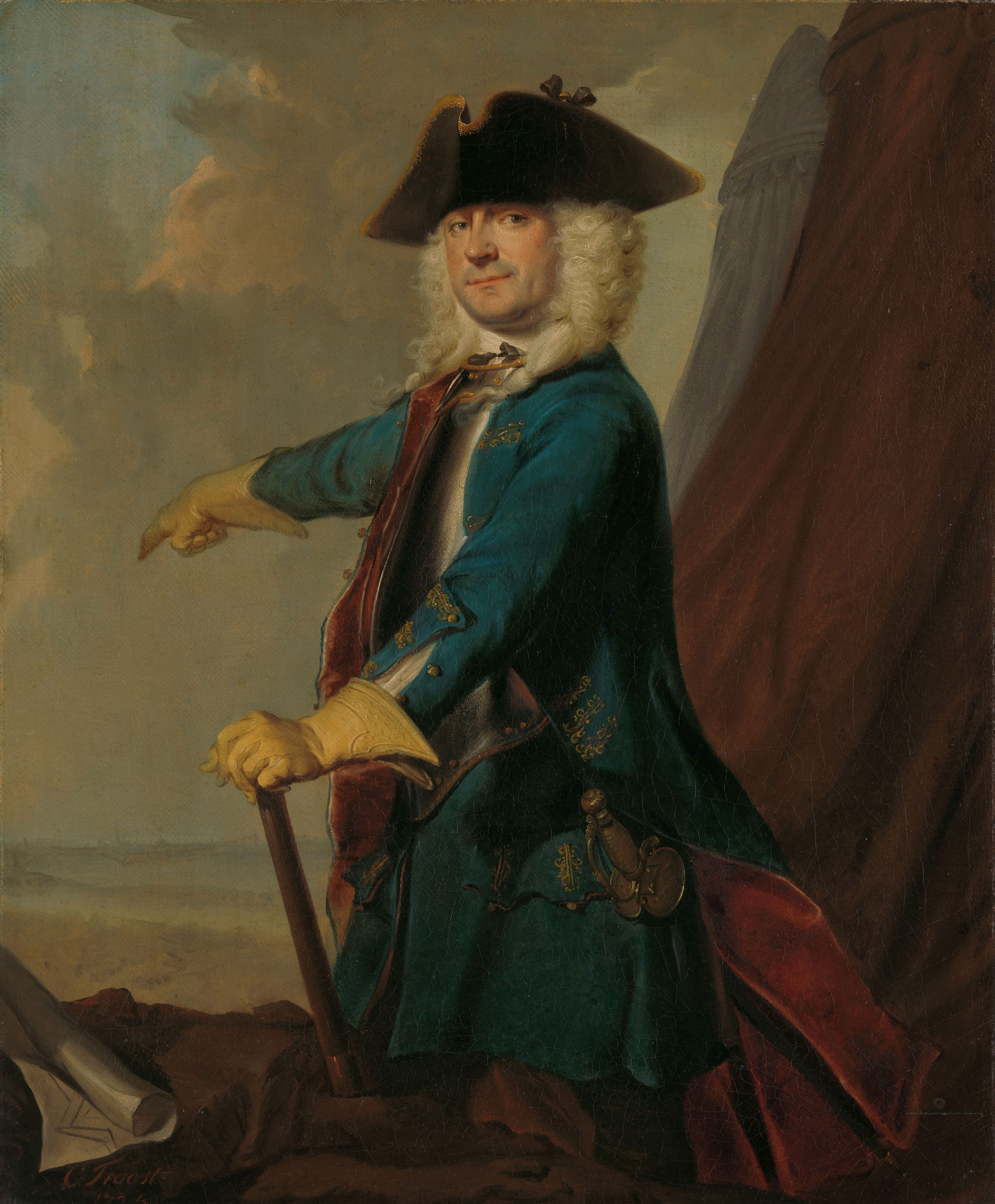
Portrait of Gerrit Sichterman, 1725

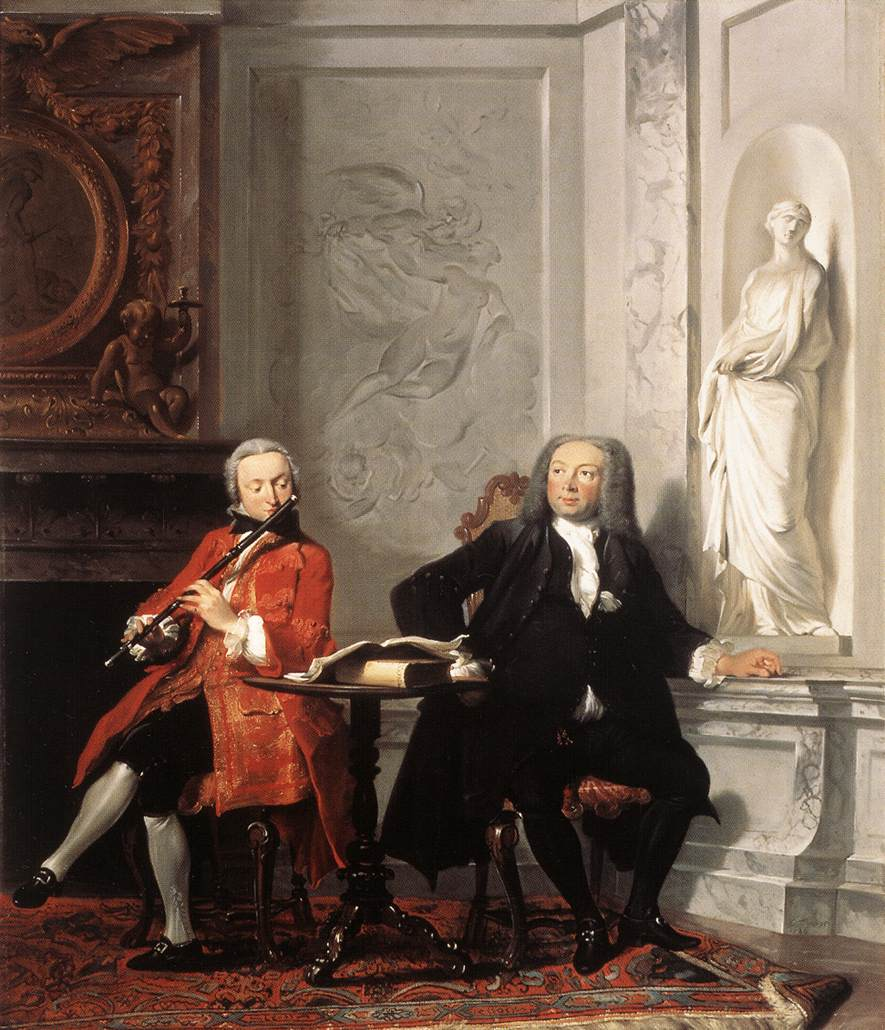
Jeronimus Tonneman and his Son, 1736, oil on canvas, National Gallery of Ireland, Dublin, Ireland

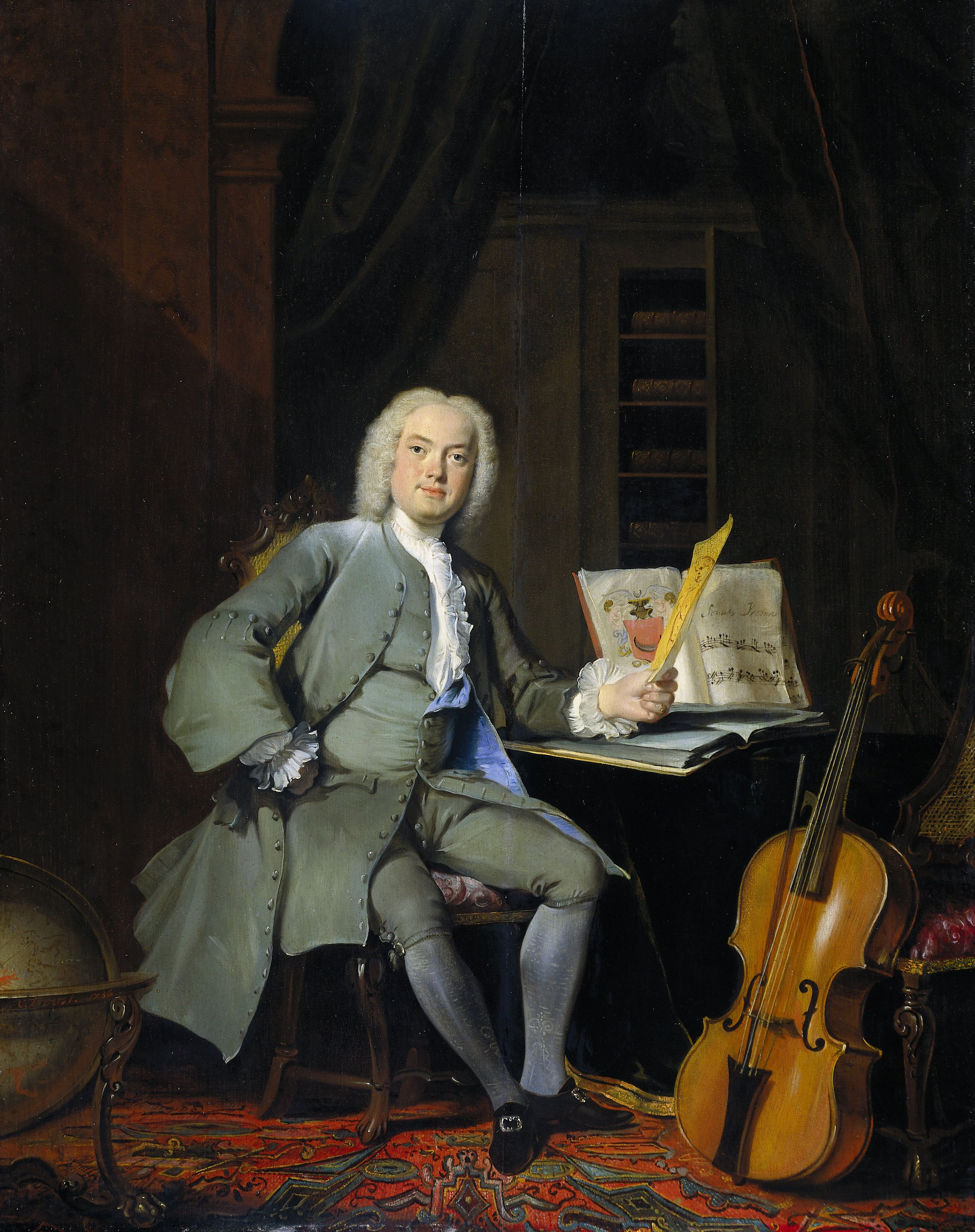
Portrait of a Member of the Van der Mersch Family, 1736, Rijksmuseum

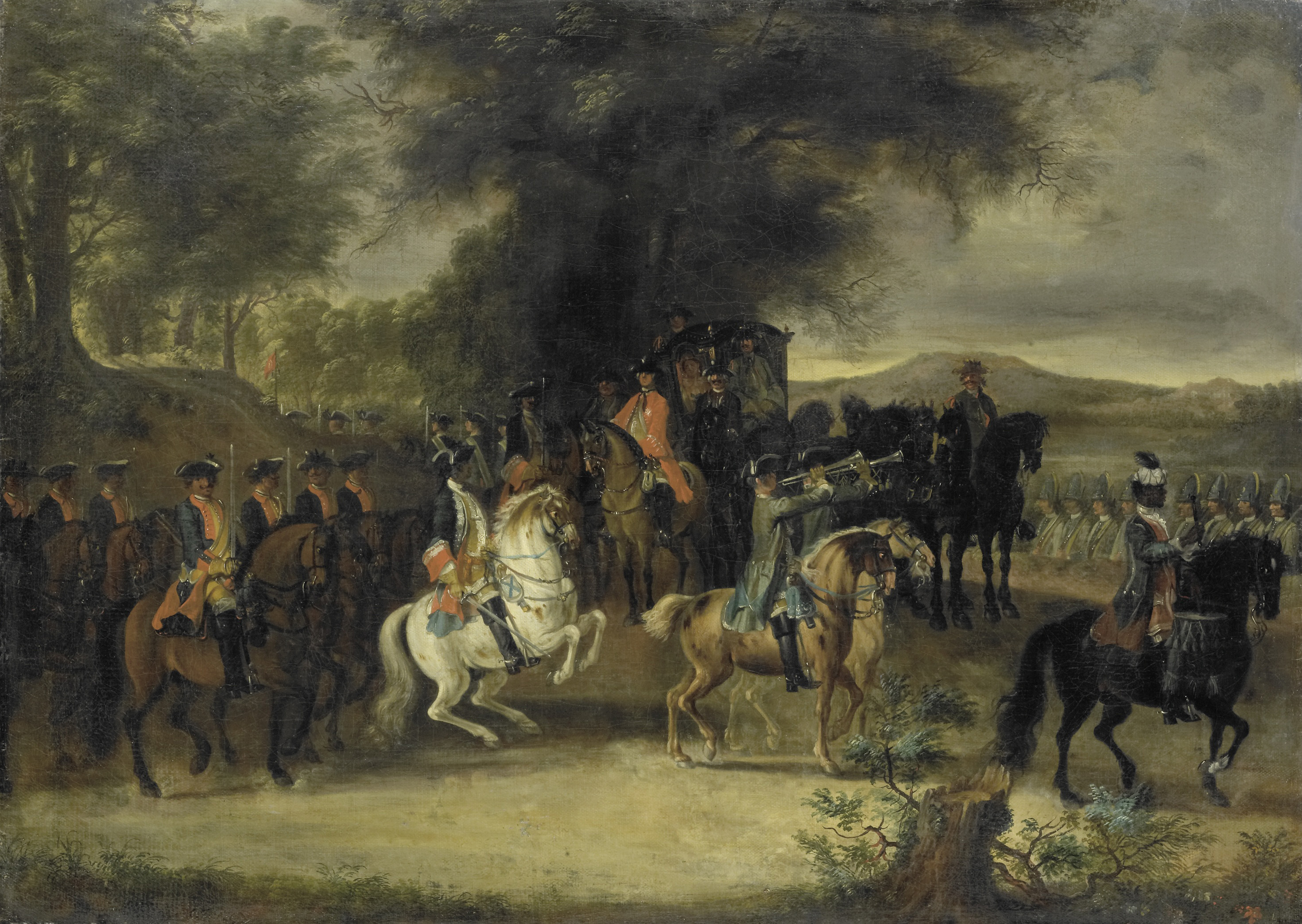
Inspection of a Cavalry Regiment, 1742

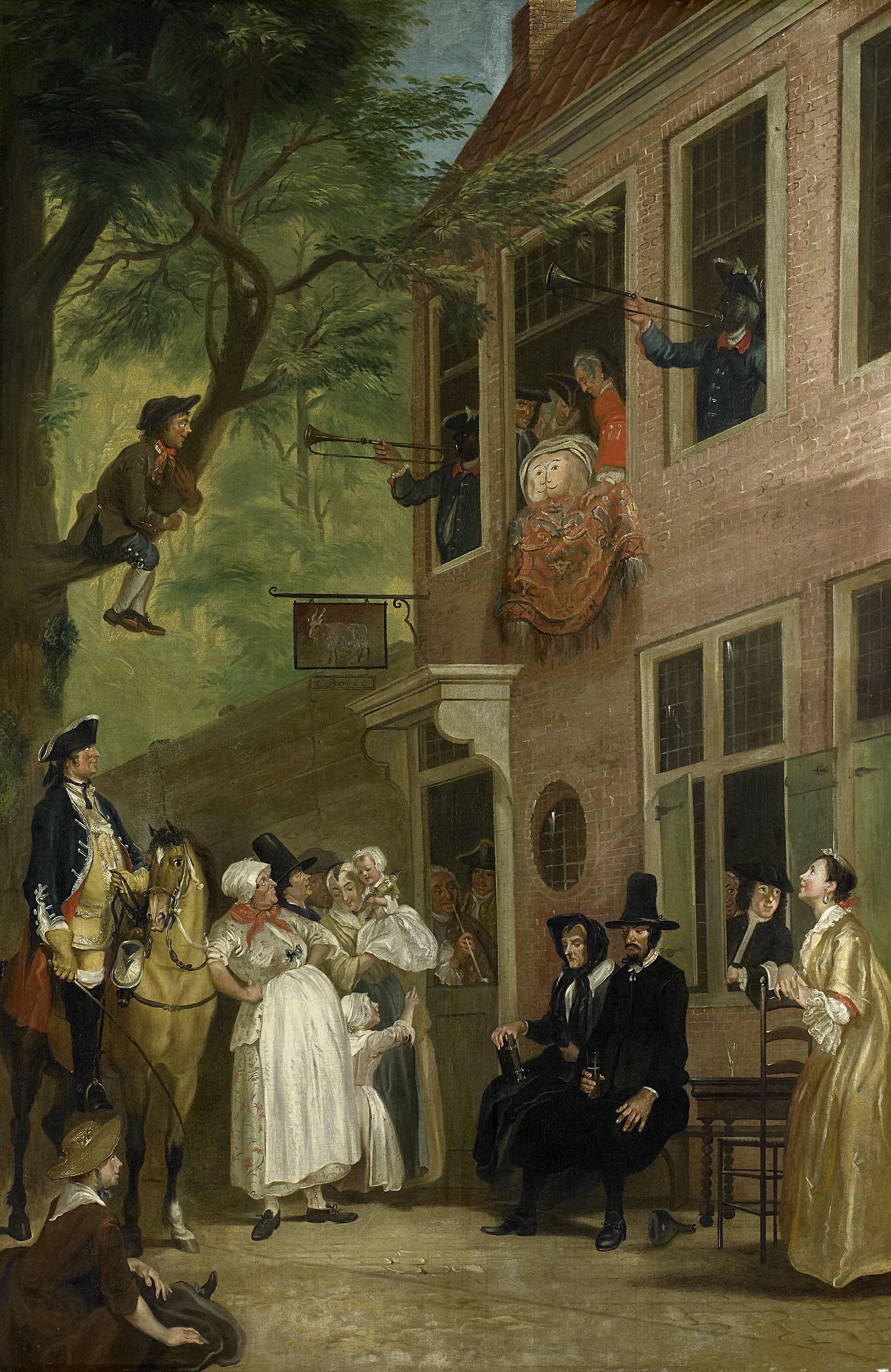
The Misleys, c.1720–1750, Rijksmuseum

His pupils were Jacobus Buys, Noël Challe, Pieter Tanjé, and his own daughter Sara Troost. He had five daughters and they were all trained in the arts, but only Sara had works engraved by other artists. She married the printer Jacob Ploos van Amstel and another daughter Elisabeth married his brother, the Amsterdam painter Cornelis Ploos van Amstel.

A famous descendant is Paul Ludwig Troost, a leading architect of Adolf Hitler.

== Public collections ==
Among the public collections holding works by Cornelis Troost are:

- Museum de Fundatie in Zwolle, The Netherlands
- Rijksmuseum Amsterdam, The Netherlands
- Mauritshuis, The Hague, The Netherlands
- Museo Municipal de Vigo "Quiñones de León", Spain
