= Amstelkerk =

Church in Amsterdam, Netherlands

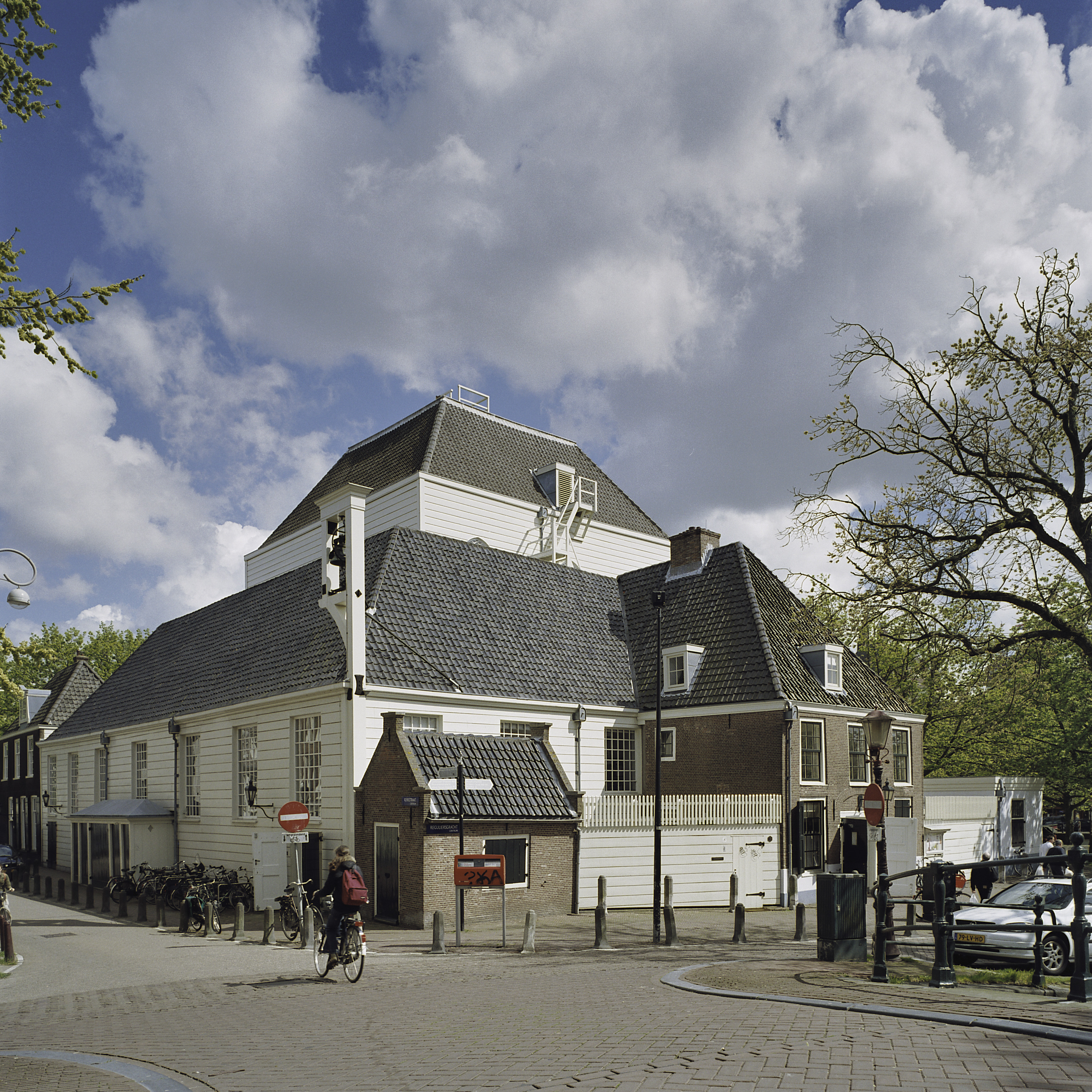
- The Amstelkerk in 2005

Religion
- Affiliation: Protestant Church in the Netherlands
- Rite: Calvinist

Location
- Location: Amstelveld 10, Amsterdam, Netherlands
- Interactive map of Amstelkerk
- Coordinates: 52°21′44″N 4°53′47″E

Architecture
- Architects: Daniël Stalpaert; Hendrik Springer
- Style: Dutch Renaissance
- Groundbreaking: 1668
- Completed: 1670

The Amstelkerk (English: Amstel Church) is a Reformed church building in central Amsterdam, Netherlands. It lies in the southern part of the Grachtengordel neighborhood, near the Amstel River, between the Prinsengracht, Reguliersgracht and Keizersgracht. The church was designed by Daniël Stalpaert and was originally intended as a wooden emergency church, erected to provide for church services in the fourth Golden Age extension of Amsterdam laid out in 1662, but it was never replaced by a more permanent building. The church was expanded several times starting in 1673 with annexes built of stone. The interior originally had a very modest appearance, but was replaced by a neogothic design by Hendrik Springer in 1842. In the early 19th century, plans were drawn up, but never executed, to build the Dutch Mint in the square next to church. The church was bought by Stadsherstel Amsterdam in the late 1980s, which completed renovations in 1990.

The building is no longer in use as a church. Some parts of the building have been converted to office space, and the church is used for classical concerts. The building is open to the public on weekdays from 9:00 to 17:00.

== Trivia ==
Johannes Paulus Stricker, the uncle of Vincent van Gogh, was a preacher in the Amstelkerk.
