= Susanna Maria van der Duyn =

18th century Dutch actress

Maria Chalon, or Susanna Maria van der Duyn (1698 The Hague – 1780 Amsterdam), was an 18th-century actress and embroiderer from the Dutch Republic. She is best known as the wife of Cornelis Troost.

She was the illegitimate daughter of the actress Anna Maria Rigo and the gentleman Nicolaas van der Duyn of Rijswijk. Her mother married the 12-year-younger actor Louis Chalon when Susanna was ten, and from that moment called herself Maria Chalon. She later married the actor Cornelis Troost, whom she had met when they were both accepted as actors for the Amsterdam Schouwburg in 1717 where they were paid one guilder per play. After the death of her mother, Maria travelled in a travelling actor troupe with her father. In 1720, she married Troost in Zwolle, and they settled for a steady job in Amsterdam, where they both acted and he made the backdrop decorations until 1724, when they quit from the stage, he to take up portrait painting. She continued to work for the theatre as an embroideress. One of her daughters was artist Sara Troost.
