= Jacob Folkema =

Dutch designer and engraver

Jacob Folkema (18 August 1692 – 3 February 1767), a Dutch designer and engraver, was born and died at Dokkum, in Friesland. He was first instructed by his father, Johann Jakob Folkema, a goldsmith, and studied afterwards under B. Picart at Amsterdam. During that time he worked for Royaumont's Bible, 1712, and Ruysch's Anatomy, 1737. Folkema was also an excellent engraver in mezzotint. He had a sister, Anna Folkema, who painted miniatures, assisted her brother, and engraved some few plates. She was born in 1695, and died in 1768. By Jakob Folkema there are, among others, the following plates:

- An Emblematical Print on the Death of the Prince of Orange.
- Time discovering the Bust of F. Rabelais, with figures and satirical and emblematical attributes.
- The Martyrdom of St. Peter and St. Paul; after Niccolò dell'Abbate.
- Several plates for the Dresden Gallery; after Le Brun and Niccolò dell'Abbate.

== Portraits ==
- Miguel Cervantes de Saavedra; after C. Kort.
- Johannes Ens, Professor of Theology at Utrecht; after Colla.
- Petrus de Maestricht, Professor of Theology at Frankfort; after the same.
- Humphrey Prideaux, Dean of Norwich; after Seeman.
- Suethlagius, Pastor at Amsterdam; after Anna Folkema.
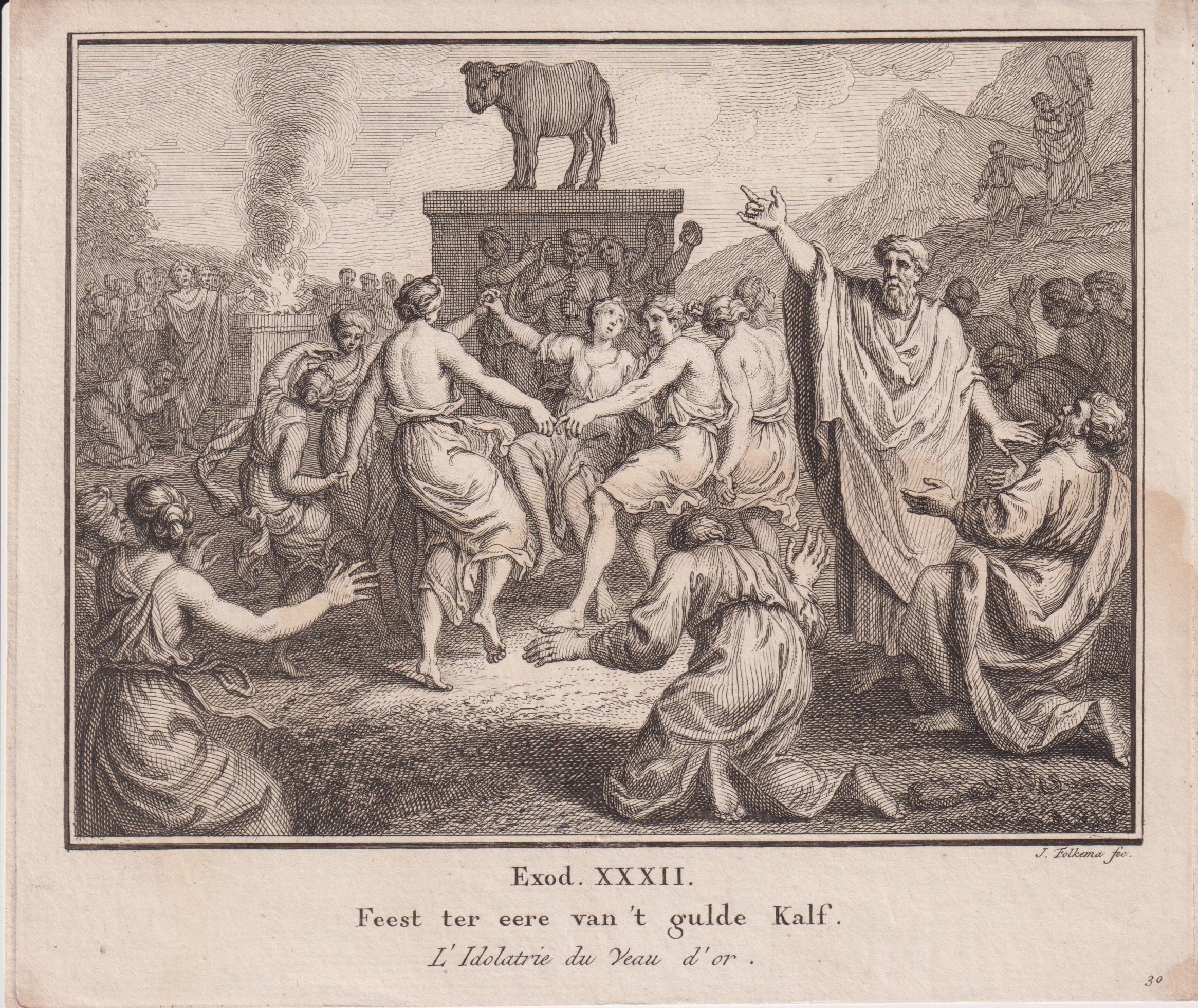
The Idolatry of the Golden Calf, dated around 1750, in collection of the Jewish Museum of Switzerland.

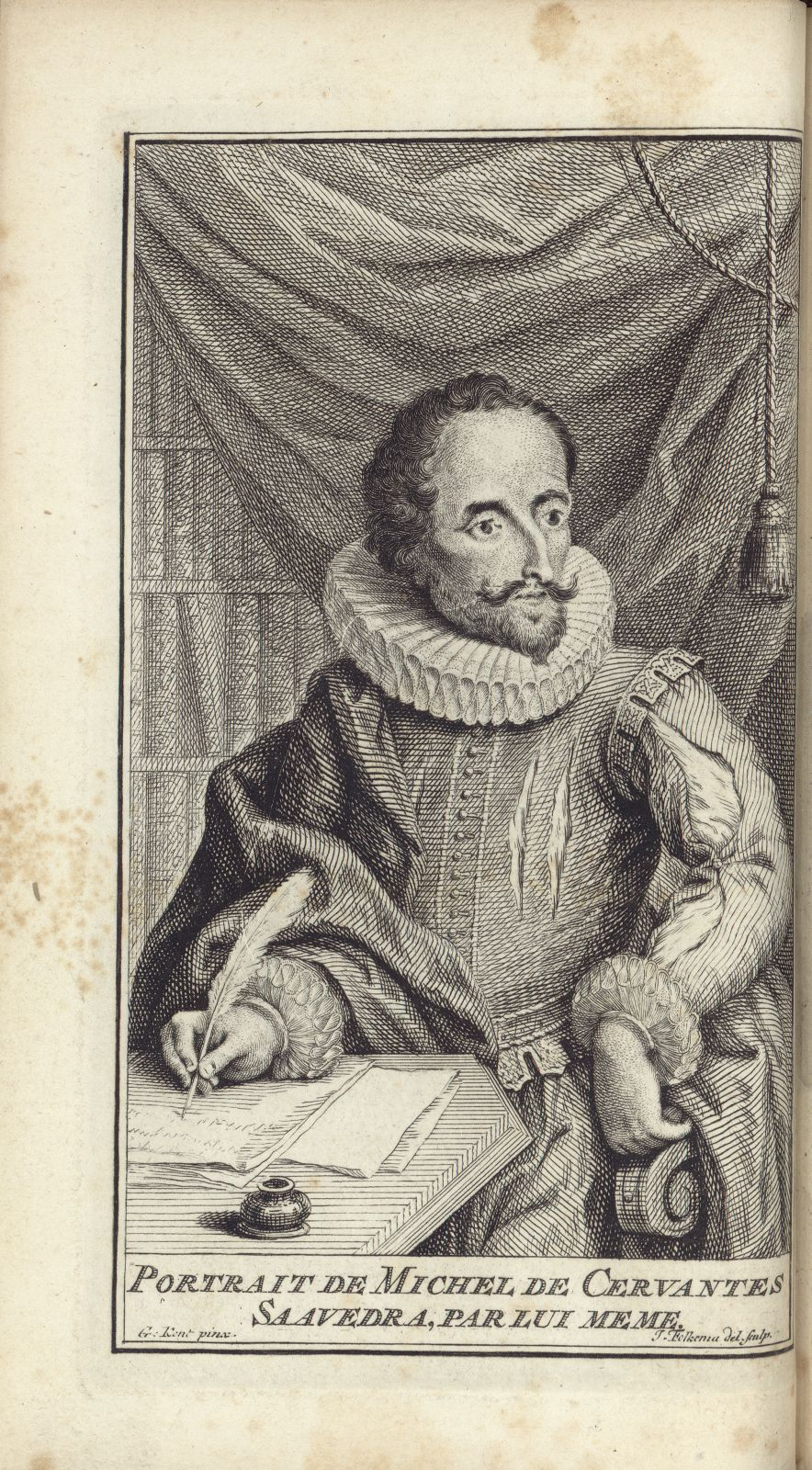
Portrait of Miguel de Cervantes, 1768

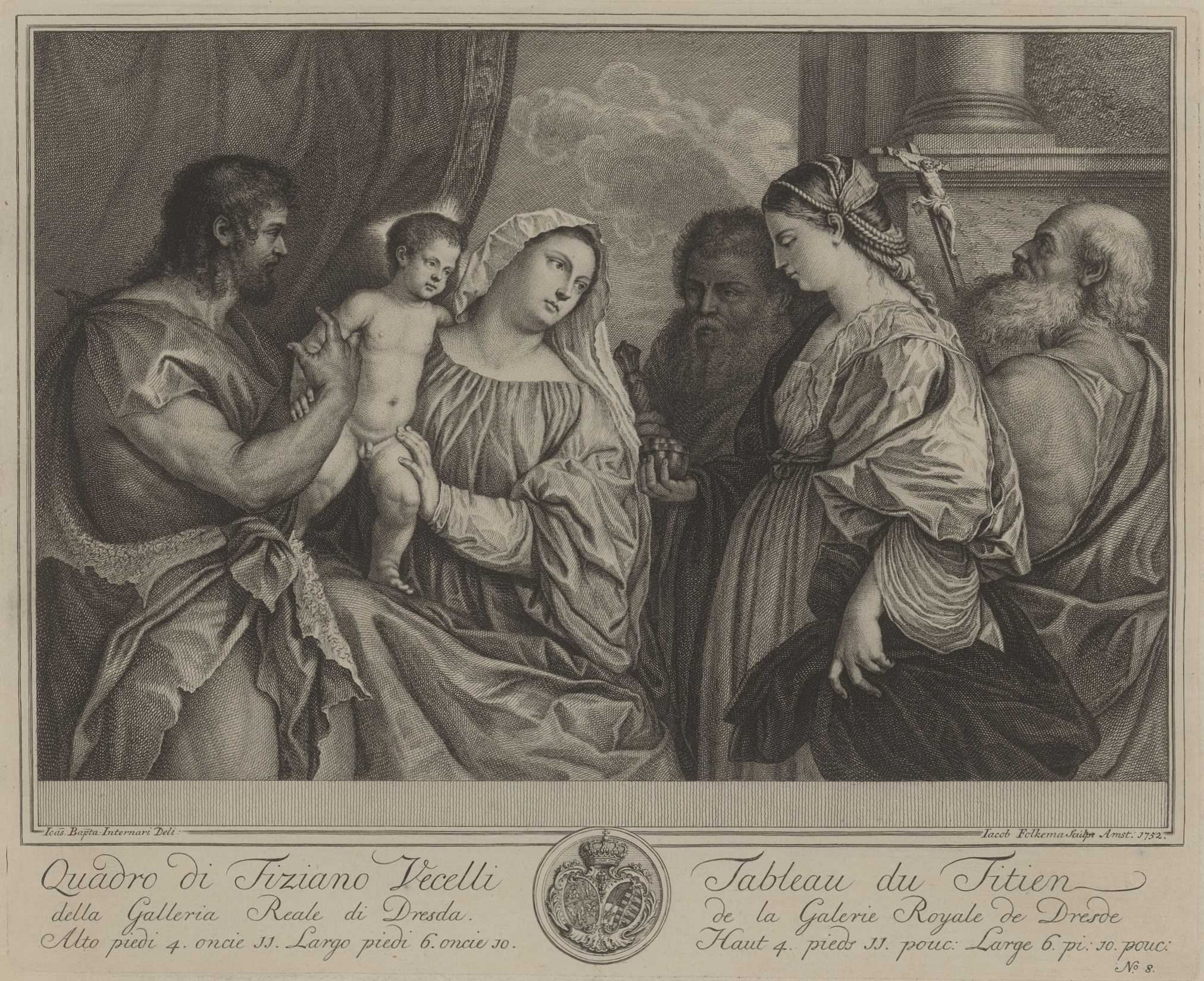
Virgin with child and four saints, after Titian, ca. 1750, in the Gemäldegalerie Alte Meister in Dresden.
