= Jan van Gool =

Dutch painter and writer

Johan van Gool
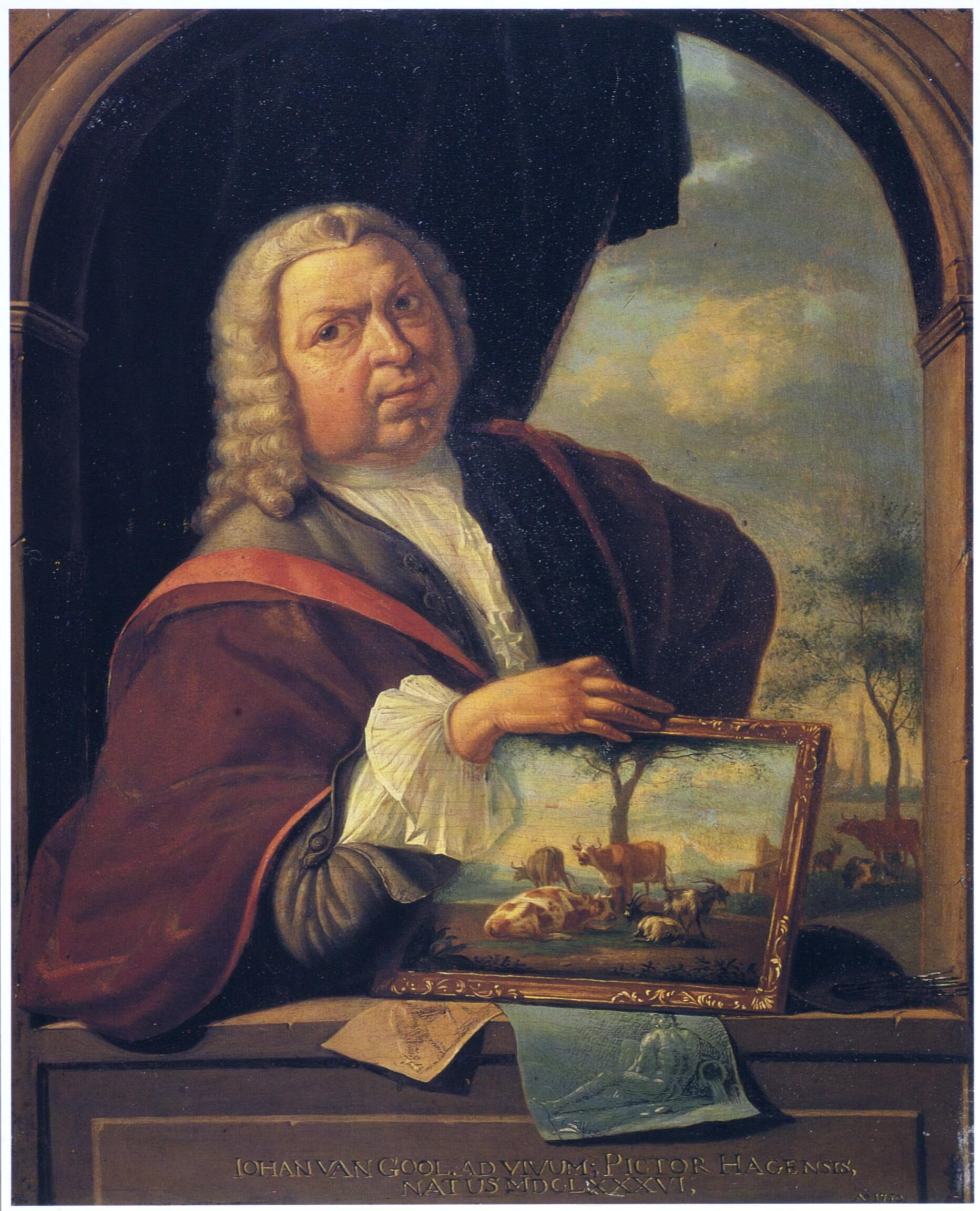
- Selfportrait, 1750
- Born: Jan van Gool; 1685; The Hague
- Died: 1763 (aged 77–78); The Hague
- Known for: Painting, Art History
- Movement: Dutch Golden Age painting

Johan, or Jan van Gool (1685–1763), was a Dutch painter and writer from The Hague, now remembered mainly as a biographer of artists from the Dutch Golden Age.

== Life ==
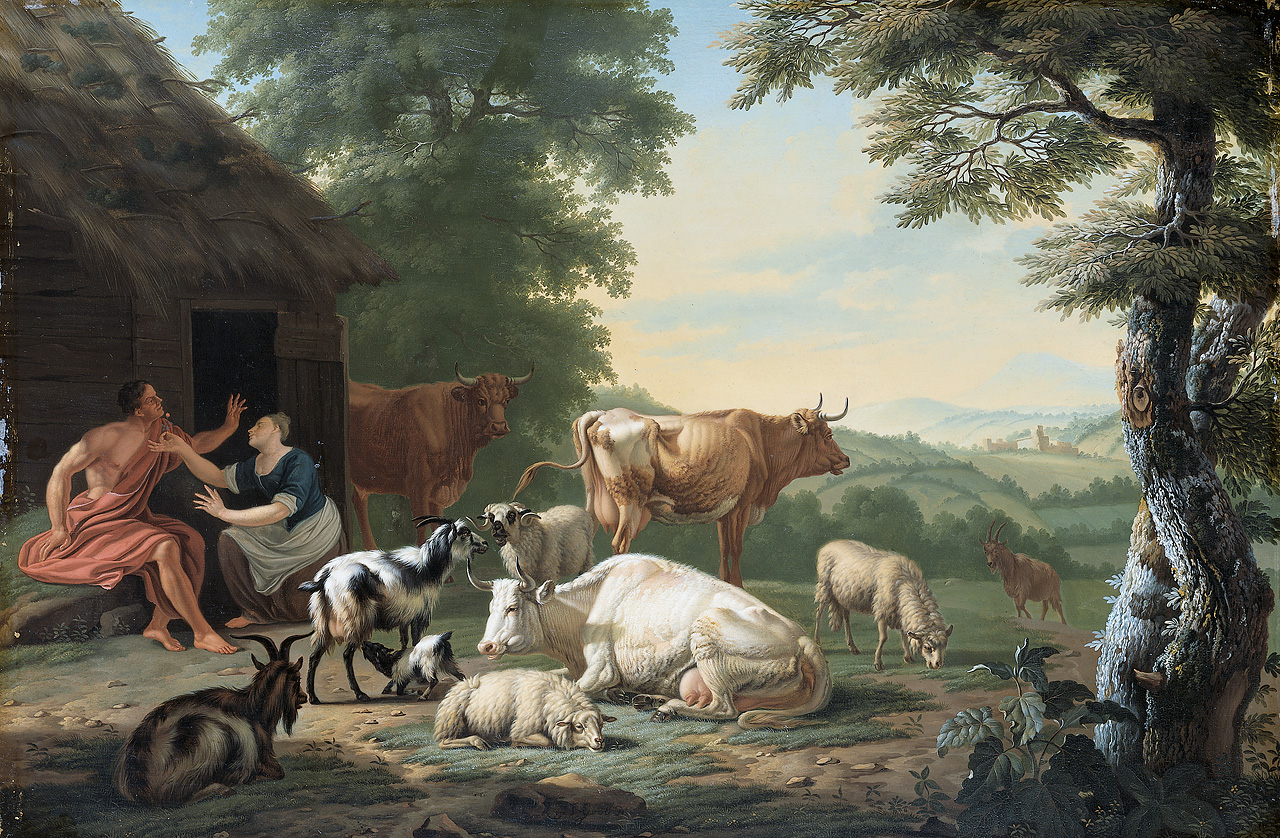
Landscape with shepherds

Jan van Gool was a pupil of Simon van der Does and Mattheus Terwesten. He became a member of the Confrerie Pictura in 1711. He was first regent, and then five years later became director, of the Hague Drawing School from 1720-1734. He spent most of his time in the Hague, but travelled to England twice and is recorded there in 1711. He specialized in Italianate landscapes.

He is best known today for his book of artist biographies, otherwise known as the "Nieuw Schouburg". The full title is De Nieuwe Schouburg der Nederlantsche kunstschilders en schilderessen: Waer in de Levens- en Kunstbedryven der tans levende en reets overleedene Schilders, die van Houbraken, noch eenig ander schryver, zyn aengeteekend, verhaelt worden. (The Hague, 1750). He meant this book as an update to the original "Schouwburg" written by his friend Arnold Houbraken, whose 3-volume Schouburg was written in order of birth year, ending with Adriaen van der Werff, born in 1659. Just as Houbraken before him, he starts his book with a tribute to his predecessors, most notably Karel van Mander and to Houbraken himself, noting however, that Houbraken included many insulting comments in his sketches that he felt were unnecessary. He starts with the artists that Houbraken left out, choosing for his first subjects two painters from the Hague, Jan van Ravensteyn and Adriaen Hanneman. He then proceeded to write short sketches in birth year order up to 1680, ending Volume I with Gerard Jan Palthe. In Volume II he continued from 1680 with Jan van Huysum and ended in 1700 with the brothers Bernard and Matthijs Accama.

His book contains many notes about Hague painters and the founding of the drawing academy in the Hague, where he lived and worked.

== List of painters in Part I ==
- Jan Antonisz. van Ravesteyn p. 15
- Cornelis Janssens van Ceulen p. 22
- Adriaen Hanneman p. 24
- Martinus Lengele p. 30
- Arnold van Ravesteyn p. 31
- Isaac Koedijck p. 36
- Jan Potheuck p. 36
- Abraham Lambertsz van den Tempel p. 37
- Jan Goedart p. 41
- Willem Eversdijck p. 43
- Cornelis Eversdyk p. 43
- Theodor van der Schuer p. 44
- Willem Doudijns p. 51
- Nikolaes Wieling p. 58
- Herman Verelst p. 59
- Pieter Hermansz Verelst p. 59
- Simon Pietersz Verelst p. 59
- Adriaen Cornelisz Beeldemaker p. 63
- Franciscus Carree p. 64
- Johan le Ducq p. 65
- Marcus de Bye p. 67
- Daniël Haring p. 69
- Daniel Mijtens the Younger p. 71
- Jan Weenix p. 79
- Robbert Duval (1639-1732) p. 83
- Johannes Vollevens p. 89
- Anthoni Schoonjans p. 94
- Jan Mortel p. 99
- Abraham Begeyn p. 100
- Elias Terwesten p. 102
- Theodoor Visscher p. 104
- Cornelis de Bruijn p. 112
- Jan van Call p. 117
- Jan Frans van Bloemen p. 121
- Pieter van Bloemen p. 122
- Hendrik Carré p. 122
- Michiel Carree p. 125
- Frank Pieterse Verheyden p. 127
- Arnold Houbraken p. 131
- N. Bodekker p. 147
- Jillis de Winter p. 150
- Jan Fielius p. 151
- Jacobus van der Sluis p. 151
- Bonaventura van Overbeek p. 154
- Theodorus Netscher p. 172
- Willem van Mieris p. 191
- Nikolaes Hooft p. 204
- Matheus de Meele p. 207
- Rachel Ruysch p. 210
- Matthijs Pool p. 234
- Pieter van der Werff p. 234
- Albert van Spiers p. 242
- Ottmar Elliger p. 243
- Herman Henstenburgh p. 248
- Elias van Nymeegen p. 256
- Kaspares Petro Verbruggen p. 264
- Theodor van Pee p. 272
- Adam Silo p. 287
- Frans Beeldemaker p. 289
- Jan Hendrik Brandon p. 293
- Arnold Boonen p. 294
- Jaques Parmantio p. 294
- Mattheus Terwesten p. 309
- Carel Borchaert Voet p. 329
- Alexander van Gaelen p. 340
- N. Cramer p. 341
- Jacob Christoph Le Blon p. 342
- Isaac de Moucheron p. 362
- Constantijn Netscher p. 367
- R. Bleek p. 374
- Gerard Rademaker p. 378
- Gerard Wigmana p. 386
- Nikolaas Verkolje p. 392
- Abraham Rademaker p. 403
- Anselmus Weeling p. 409
- Dirk Kint p. 413
- Jasper Boonen p. 414
- Margaretha Wulfraet p. 415
- Pieter Hardimé p. 418
- Simon Hardimé p. 418
- Jan Serin p. 423
- Coenraedt Roepel p. 426
- Jacob Campo Weyerman p. 434
- Philip van Dijk p. 440
- Henrik van Limborch p. 448
- Jan Palthe p. 370
- Gerard Jan Palthe p. 469

== List of painters in Part II ==
- Jan van Huysum p. 13
- Justus van Huysum p. 30
- Jacob van Huysum p. 30
- N. Haverman p. 32
- Hendrik Hulst p. 32
- Herman van der Mijn p. 34
- Frans Dekker p. 49
- Wilhelmus Troost p. 50
- Jacoba Maria van Nickelen p. 52
- Matthijs Balen p. 55
- Abraham Torenvlied p. 57
- Johannes Vollevens II p. 57
- Balthasar Denner p. 62
- Jacques Ignatius de Roore p. 86
- Isaak Walraven p. 116
- Hieronimus van der My p. 129
- Jan Maurits Quinkhard p. 130
- Dirk Dalens p. 134
- Bartholomeus Douven p. 136
- N. Anchilus p. 138
- Robbert Griffier p. 140
- Johannes Vogelsang p. 143
- Francis Vergh p. 145
- Frans van Mieris the Elder p. 147
- Jan Abel Wassenberg p. 152
- Antoni de Waerd p. 157
- Jacob Appel (painter) p. 158
- Pieter van Call p. 165
- Jan van Call p. 168
- Jan Wandelaer p. 169
- Henriëtta van Pee p. 179
- Harmanus Wolters p. 191
- Cornelis Pronk p. 193
- Abraham de Haen p. 198
- Jan de Beijer p. 199
- Louis Fabricius Dubourg p. 200
- Gerard Melder p. 205
- Adriaen van der Burg p. 212
- Abraham Carré p. 215
- Hendrik Carré II p. 217
- Johannes Carré p. 218
- Jacob de Wit p. 218
- Jacob van Liender p. 238
- Theodoor Hartzoeker p. 239
- Cornelis Troost p. 241
- Sara Troost p. 252
- Louis de Moni p. 259
- Leonard François Louis p. 262
- Johan Hendrik Keller p. 266
- Engel Sam p. 273
- Johan Graham p. 276
- Mattheus Verheyden p. 278
- Jan George Freezen p. 297
- Antoni Elliger p. 301
- Christina Maria Elliger p. 303
- Gerard Sanders p. 304
- Johannes Antiquus p. 307
- Dionys van Nymegen p. 318
- Andreas van der Myn p. 321
- Cornelia van der Mijn p. 321
- Gerard van der Myn p. 321
- Frans van der Mijn p. 322
- George van der Mijn p. 326
- Robbert van der Myn p. 326
- Herman Diederik Cuipers p. 327
- Pierre Lyonnet p. 330
- Kornelis Greenwood p. 338
- Aert Schouman p. 346
- Tibout Regters p. 353
- Augustinus Terwesten p. 355
- Jan Verbruggen p. 358
- Arnout Rentinck p. 361
- Jan ten Compe p. 364
- Ludolf Bakhuizen p. 366
- Hendrik de Winter p. 369
- Jan Palthe p. 370
- Jacobus Buys p. 372
- Nikolaes Reyers p. 372
- Hendrik Pothoven p. 374
- Adriaen van der Werff p. 376
- Huchtenburg p. 410
- Gerard Hoet p. 415
- Carel de Moor p. 422
- Roelof Koets p. 438
- Nicolaas Piemont p. 441
- Jan van Mieris p. 442
- Jan Boeckhorst p. 450
- Domenicus van Wijnen p. 451
- Dionys Godyn p. 454
- Nikolaes van Ravestein p. 455
- Isaak van der Vinne p. 455
- Jan Vincentsz van der Vinne p. 455
- Cornelis Dusart p. 457
- Jan Vermeer van Utrecht p. 460
- Norbert van Bloemen p. 463
- Abraham Brueghel p. 463
- Jan Batist Breugel p. 464
- N. de Winter p. 465
- Jacomo van Staveren p. 466
- Jacobus de Baen p. 466
- Jan Adriaensz van Staveren p. 466
- Dirk Valkenburg p. 477
- Jacob Ochtervelt p. 488
- S. van der Hoog p. 489
- Meindert Hobbema p. 490
- Jan Wijnants p. 490
- J. Fournier p. 492
- Bernard Accama p. 493
- Matthijs Accama p. 493
