= Vollevens =

Vollevens is a surname. Notable people with the surname include:

- Johannes Vollevens (1649–1728), Dutch painter
- Johannes Vollevens II (1685–1759), Dutch painter
