= Antiquus (name) =

Antiquus is a surname. Notable people with the surname include:

- Bernardus Compostellanus Antiquus (fl. 13th century), Spanish canonist
- Johannes Antiquus (1702–1750), Dutch painter
- Lucius Pullaienus Gargilius Antiquus (fl. 2nd century), Roman senator
- Quintus Coredius Gallus Gargilius Antiquus (fl. 2nd century), Roman senator
