= Van Mierevelt =

Van Mierevelt is a Dutch surname. Notable people with the surname include:

- Michiel Jansz. van Mierevelt (1566–1641), Dutch painter and draftsman
- Pieter van Mierevelt (1596–1623), Dutch painter
