= Jan George Freezen =

German painter

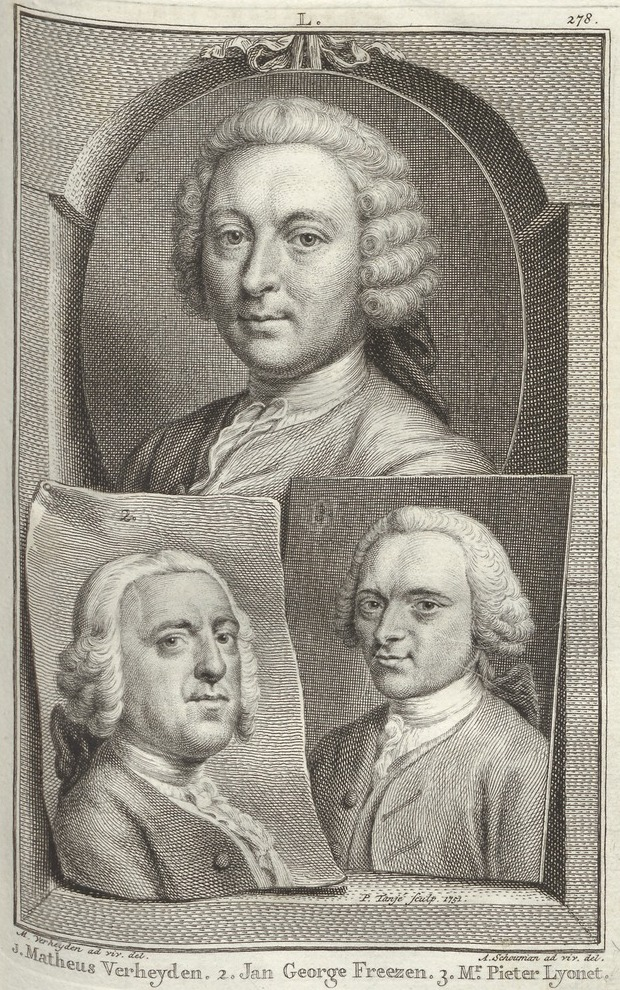
Portrait of Freezen (bottom left) and his fellow painters from The Hague, Mattheus Verheyden (top) and Pierre Lyonnet (bottom right), from Jan van Gool's Nieuw Schouburg from 1751

Jan George Freezen or Johann Georg Freesen (born 1701) was a portrait painter born in Palts, near Heidelberg. He first studied under Jan van Nikkelen, and afterwards under Philip van Dyk, with whom he became one of the best scholars, and with whom he stayed seven years at the Hague. He was patronized by the Duke of Hesse, and was appointed as the historical and portrait painter at the court of Cassel. He possessed a great knowledge of paintings, which he acquired in Germany, Italy, France, and in the school of Philip van Dyk — an acquisition which was of the greatest use in the establishment of the Cassel Gallery. He died in Cassel in 1775.
