= Mattheus Verheyden =

Dutch painter (1700–1776)

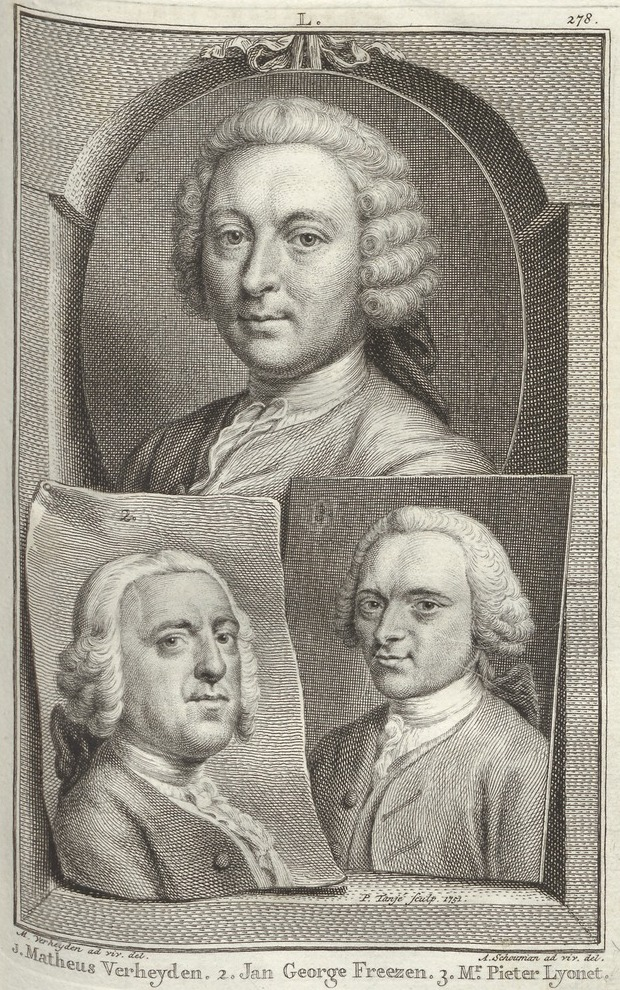
- Portrait of Verheyden (top) with fellow Hague painters Jan George Freezen and Pieter Lyonet in Johan van Gool's Schouburg
- Born: 1 July 1700; Breda, Dutch Republic
- Died: 3 November 1776 (aged 76); The Hague, Dutch Republic
- Parent: Franck Verheyden

Mattheus Verheyden (1 July 1700 – 3 November 1776) was a painter from the Dutch Republic.

== Biography ==
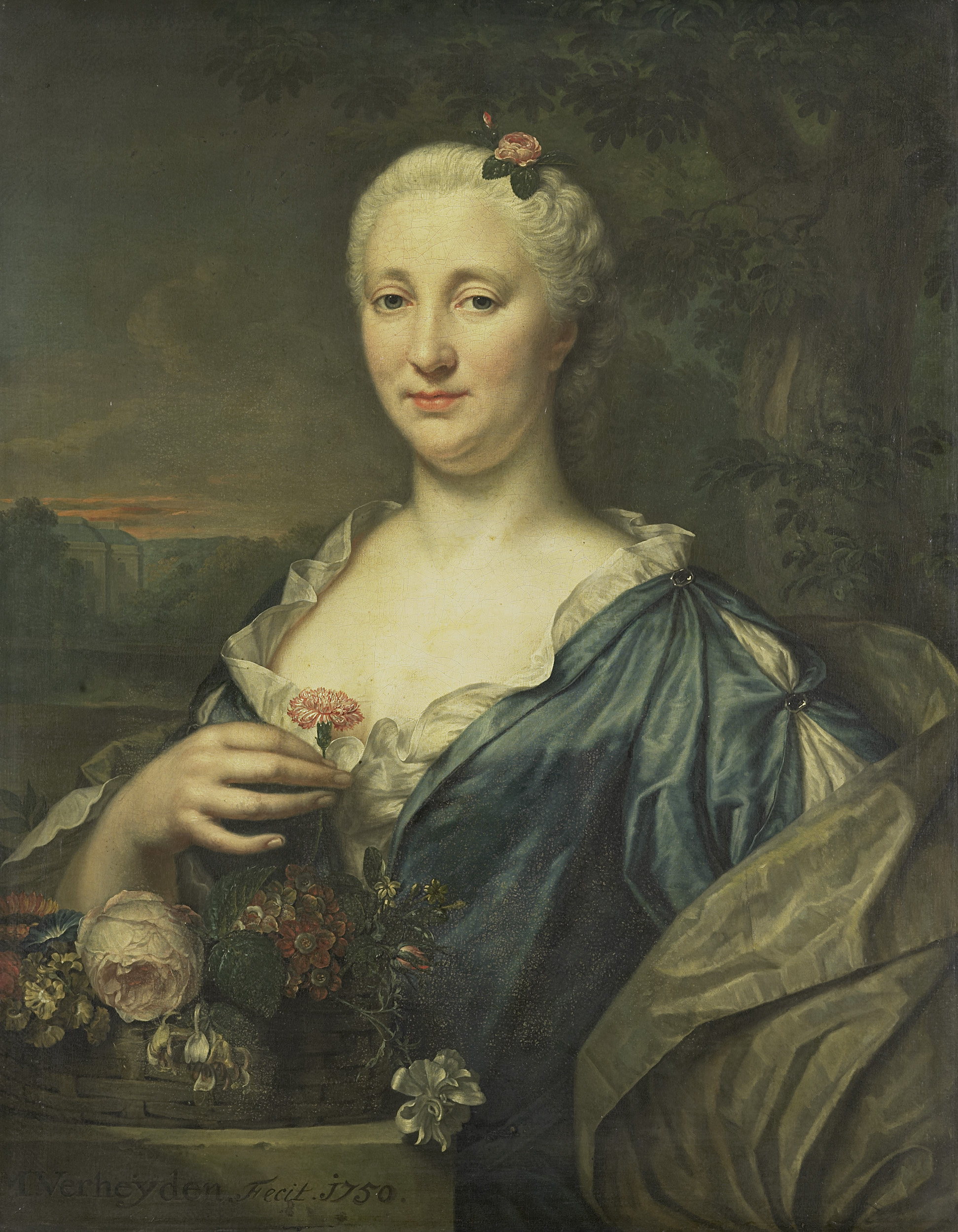
Portrait of Agnes Margaretha Albinus, 1750

Verheyden was born in Breda. According to the RKD, he was the son of the painter Franck Pietersz Verheyden who died before he could teach him to paint, though in fact his earliest work was painted at age 17. He was a pupil of Hendrik Carré II, Constantijn Netscher, Carel de Moor, and Augustinus Terwesten II and was a member of the Confrerie Pictura until 1762.

According to Johan van Gool, Verheyden's mother died when he was two, leaving his father with seven children, of whom Mattheus was the youngest. Though his father remarried, Mattheus became a ward of the city of Breda when his father died in 1711. The city orphanage regents sent him to The Hague, where he took lessons for a year from Hendrik Carré, and where he studied with and copied the works of Carel de Moor, and Augustinus Terwesten II (and the works of their fathers that they gave him). In 1722, he decided to make a trip to England, but stopped in Amsterdam first, where he painted several portraits. He then travelled to Breda to paint the regents who had helped him and to accept his inheritance money with which he was to travel. He made many portraits of the leading citizens of Breda and fell in love with a lady there whom he married instead of making his trip; Margareta Kraeimes. He kept a list of all the people he painted and Van Gool published a large selection of these names in his biographical sketch. He died in The Hague.

== Gallery ==
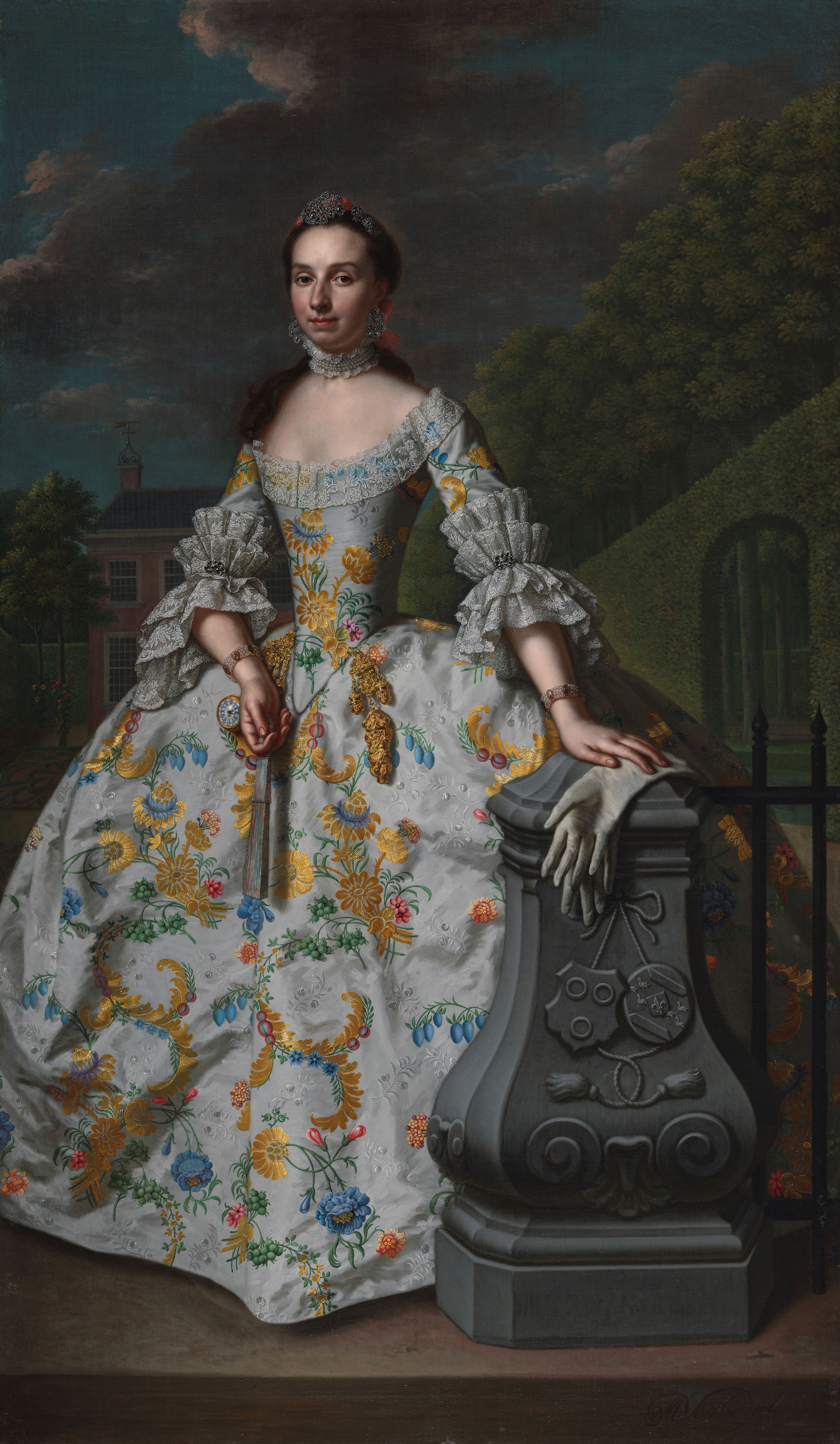
Charlotte Beatrix Strick van Linschoten, 1755

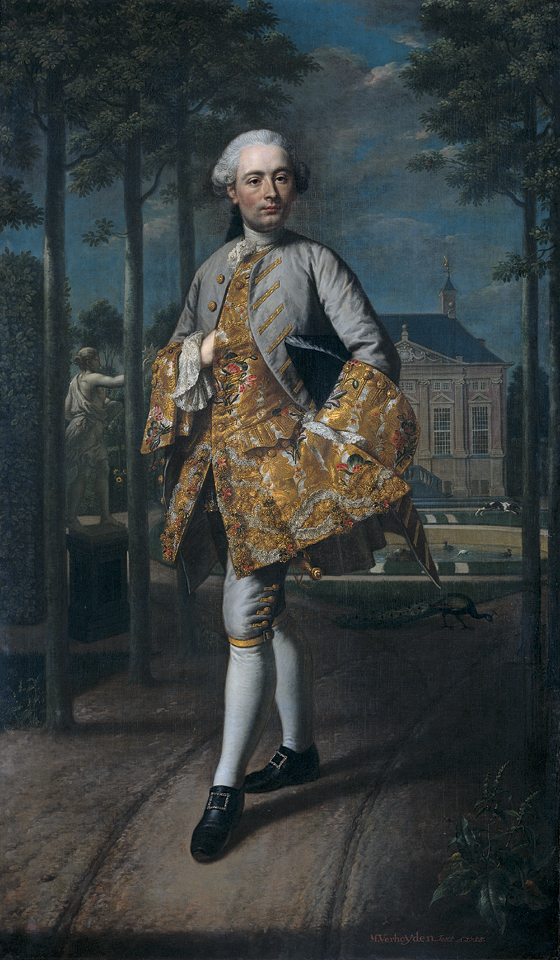
Gerard Cornelis van Riebeeck, 1755

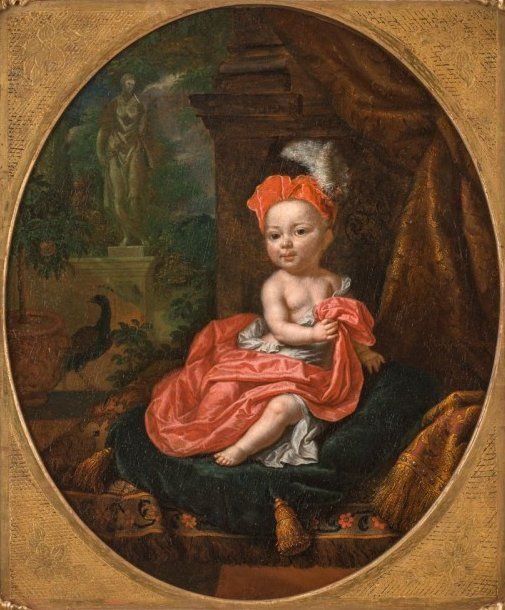
Little Prince in the Park of a Palace, 1727

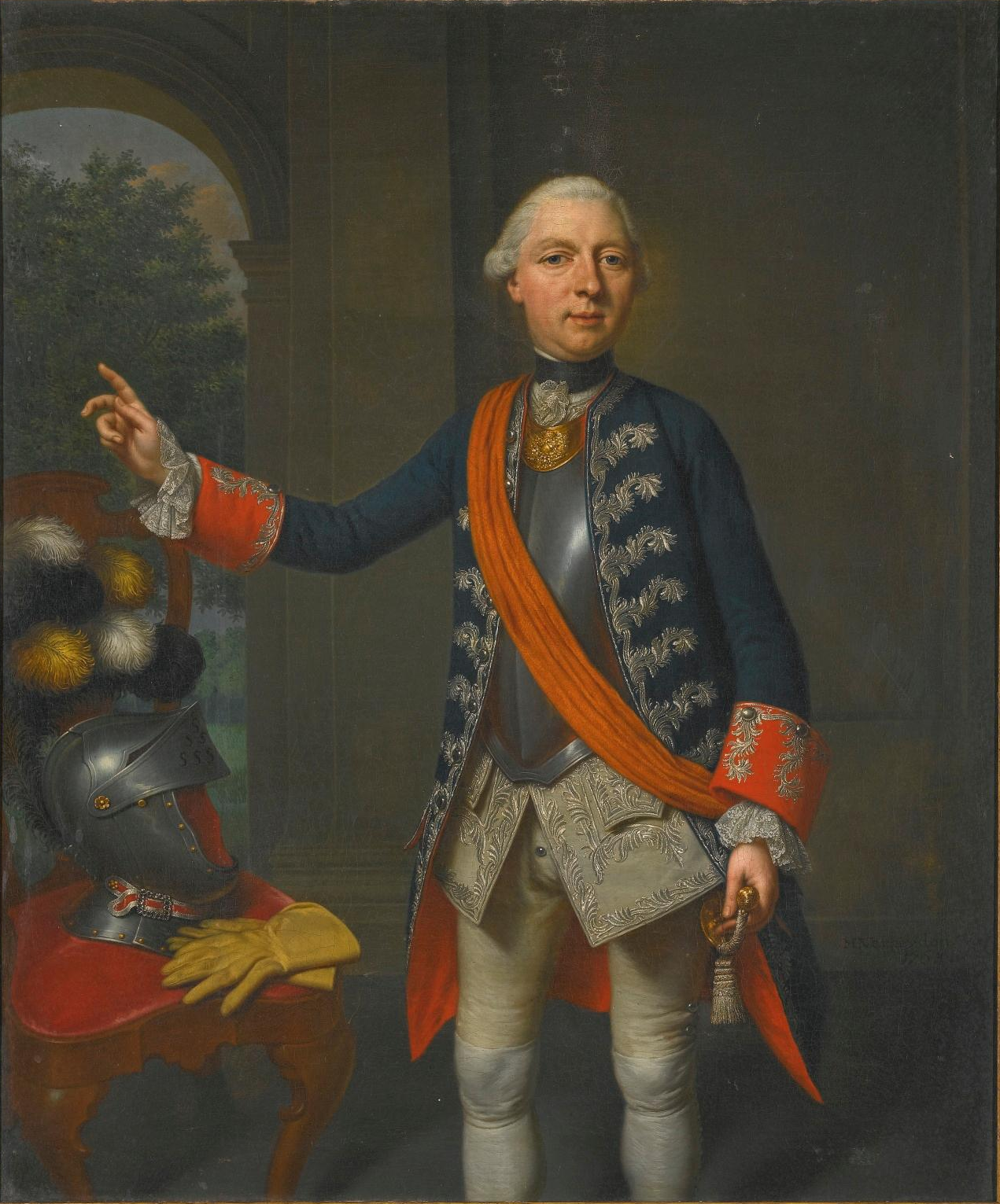
Friedrich Wilhelm Ernst Zu Schaumburg-lippe

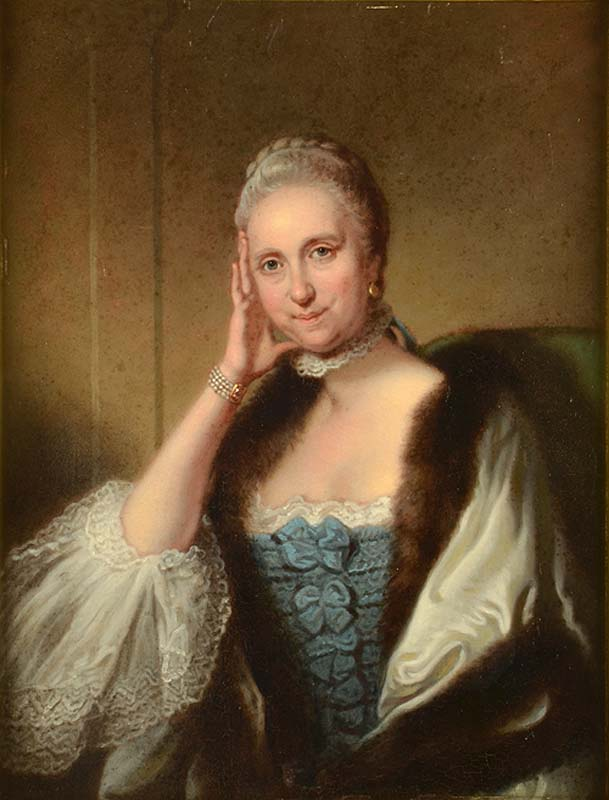
Anna Martina van Benthem

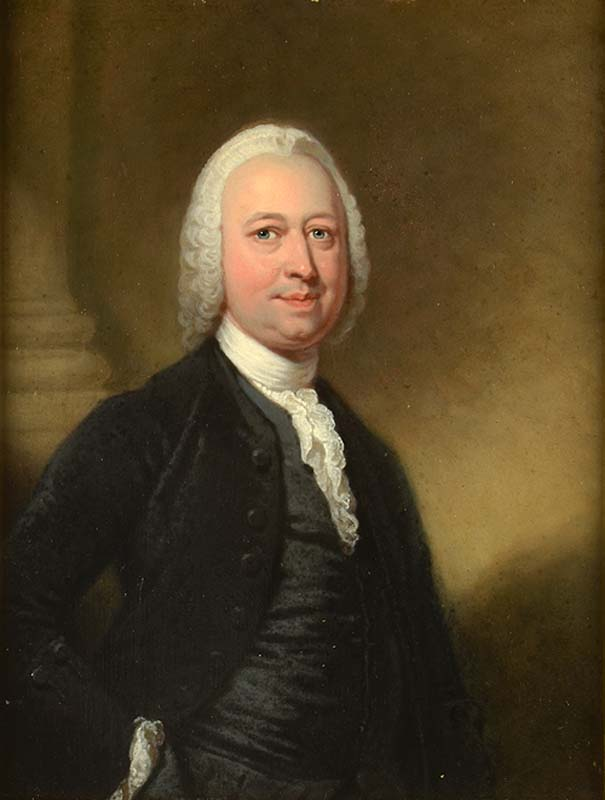
Christoffel van den Bergh

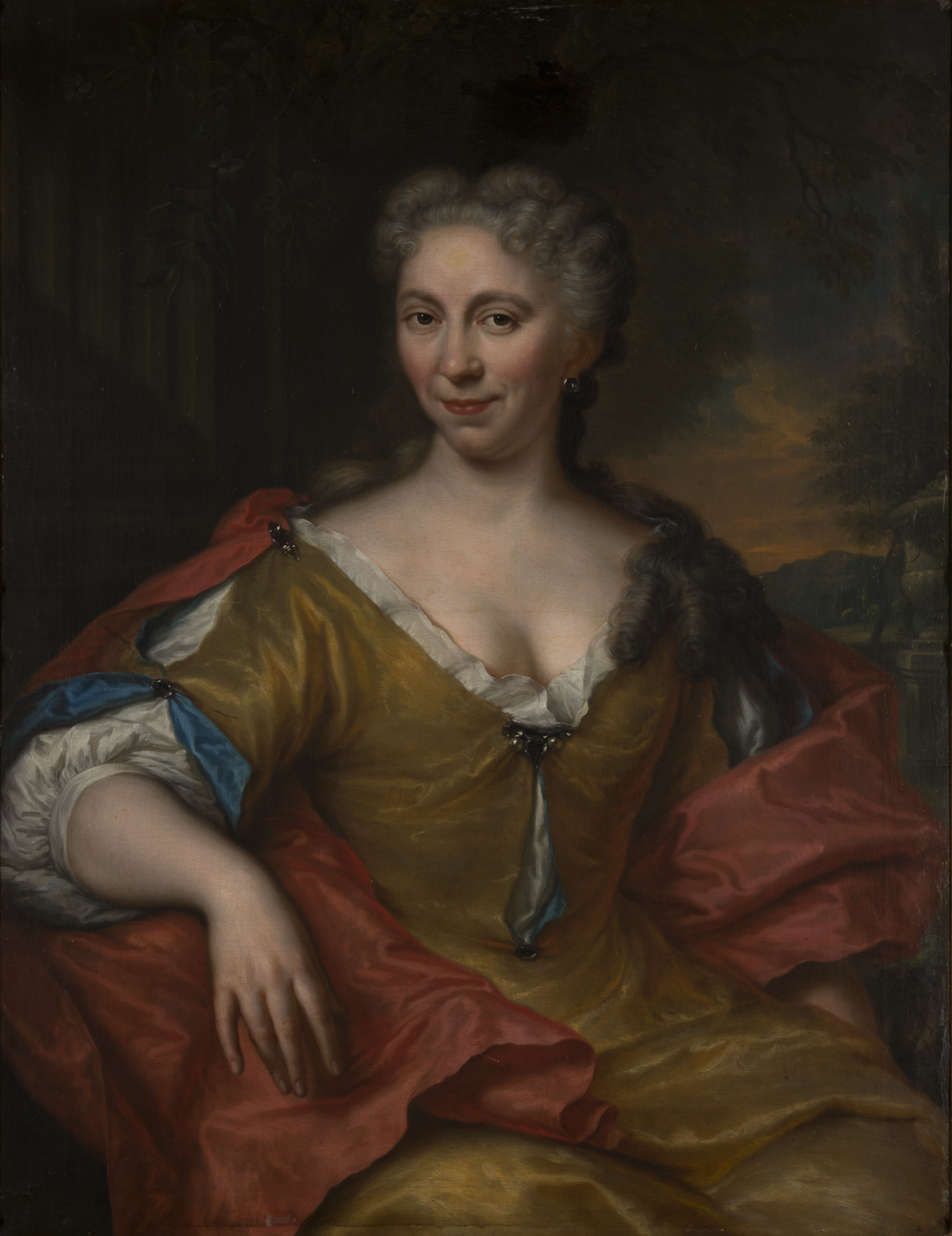
Catherina Johanna Braets
