= Johannes Christianus Roedig =

Dutch painter

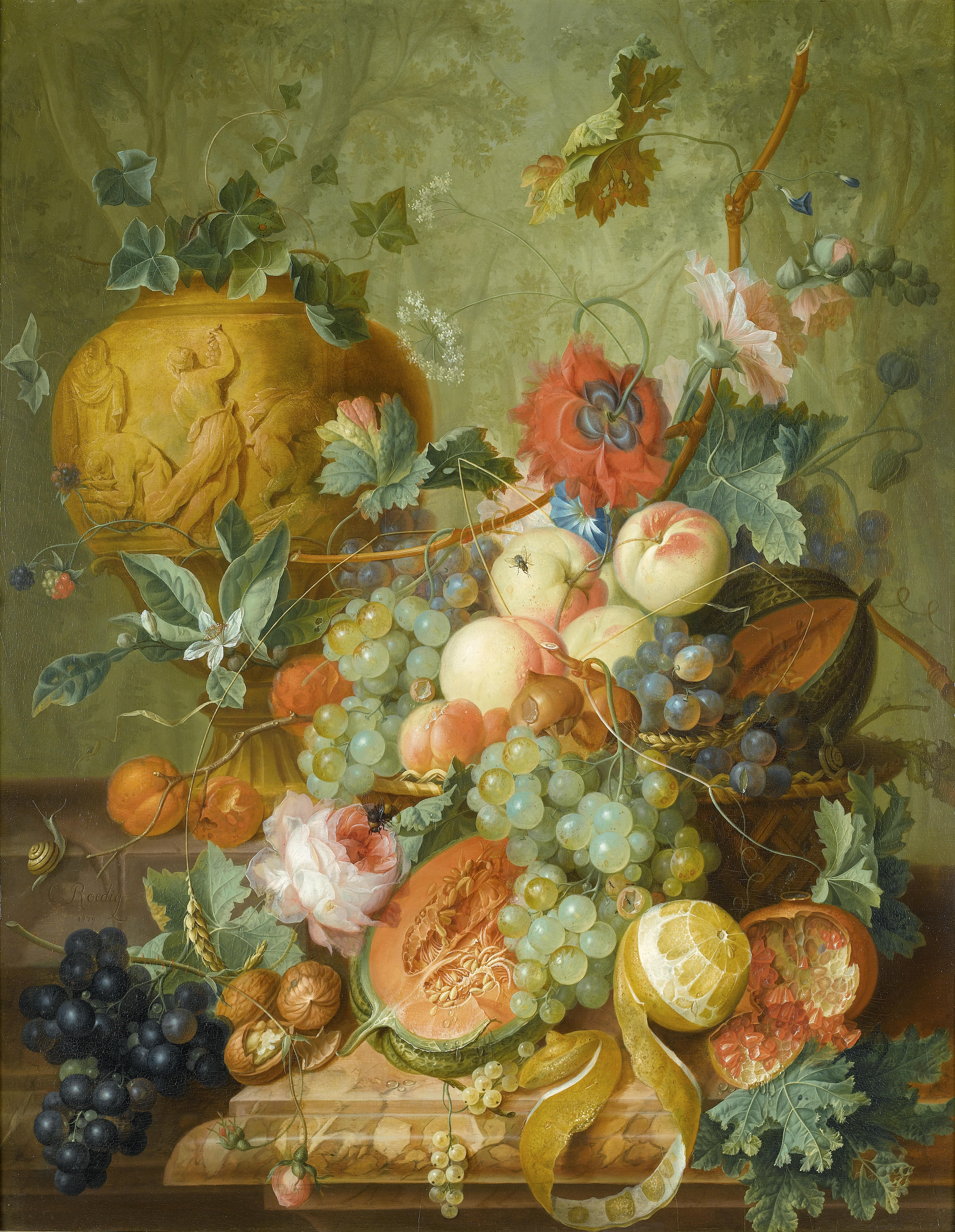
Fruit and flower still life

Johannes Christianus Roedig (1750 – 1802) was an 18th-century painter from the Dutch Republic.

== Biography ==
He was born in The Hague and became a pupil of Dirk van der Aa. He taught the painters Elisabeth Georgine Hogenhuizen and Abraham Teixeira de Mattos. He was a follower of the flower painter Jan van Huijsum. He died in The Hague.
