= Jan Goedart =

Dutch painter

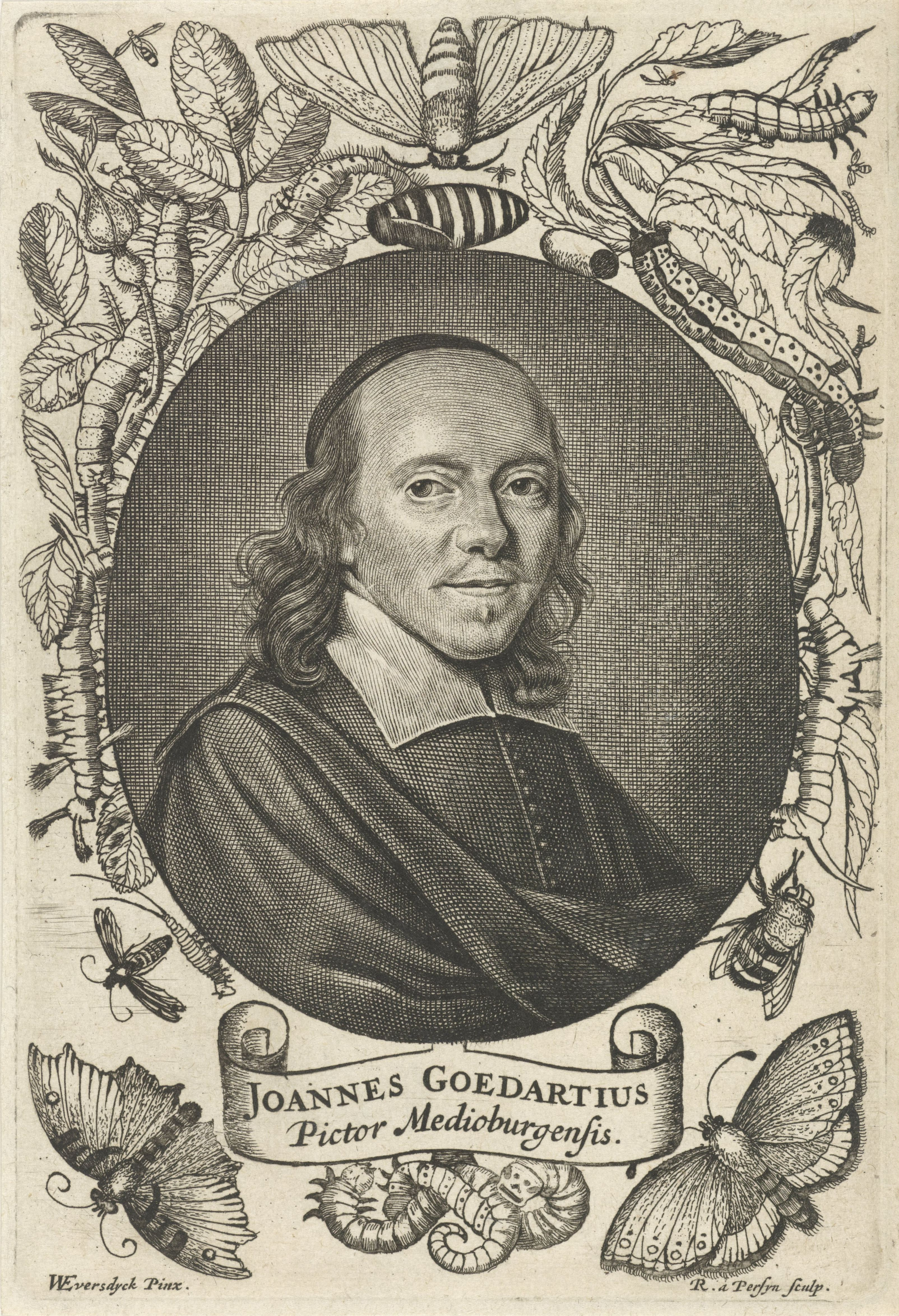
Johannes Goedaert pictor Medioburgensis, engraving by Reinier van Persijn after a portrait by Willem Eversdijck, c. 1667

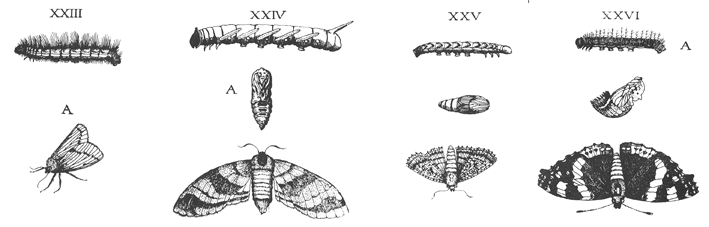
Four plates from Metamorphosis de Goedaert

Johannes Goedaert (also spelled Goetaart, Goedhart, Goedaard or Jean Goedart in French) (19 March 1617 (baptized) – 15 January 1668 (buried)) was a Dutch naturalist, entomologist and painter, famous for his illustrations of the growth and metamorphosis of insects published in a three volume work as Metamorphosis Naturalis. He was one of the earliest authors on entomology and first to write on the insects of the Netherlands and Europe, based on his own observations and experiments between 1635 and 1667.

== Life and work ==
Goedaert was born in Middelburg where he was baptized on 19 March 1617. His mother was Judith Pottier and his father Pieter Goedaert died when he was eight years old. At the age of 18 he became a member of the Saint Lucas Guild for painters. Hardly anything is known about Goedaert’s training in draughtsmanship and painting. He was a contemporary of such painters as Adriaen van de Venne, Francois Ryckhals, Mattheus Molanus and Christoffel van den Berghe, who were active in Middelburg in the first half of the 17th century. As van den Berghe included paintings of insects in his work, it has been suggested that he might have been Goedaert’s teacher. However, this is not certain. Goedaert published, in his birthplace, a book entitled Metamorphosis Naturalis between 1660 and 1669, the original edition produced by his colleague, the physician Johannes de Mey. The original edition was produced in three volumes, the first has general observations in text and two appendices by the editor. The third volume has an appendix. Some of the content may be added by de Mey and according to F. S. Bodenheimer, only the first volume has text attributable to Goedaert while the appendices were added by de Mey. This was translated into French in 1668-1669 as Histoire Naturelle des Insectes, in Latin "Metamorphosis et Historia Naturalis Insectorum" and by Martin Lister in 1682 into English as Johannes Godartius of Insects with plates by Francis Place. The book shows meticulous observations of the growth phases of insects, including metamorphosis. The life histories of parasites was not fully understood by Goedaert and he thought that caterpillars could either produce adult flies or butterflies. Throughout his life he collected, raised and studied insect larvae and maggots. He not only described the process of their development but also painted and drew the various stages the insects passed through during their life cycle. He was also the first person to give Dutch names to many types of insects found in and around Middelburg. Goedaert was a natural theologian and believed that his studies revealed the genius of the Creator. He also believed that there was a limit to exploration and did not make use of a microscope. He believed that the attraction of insects to candles was a warning to those who were excessively curious. He stimulated interest in insects and generated further research in this field through the text and the detailed illustrations in his books. Goedaert also questioned ideas of his time that mosquitoes were spontaneously created from dew. He illustrated and noted that their larvae emerged from eggs. Some landscape and still-life paintings made by Goedaert have also survived.

Goedaert married Clara de Bock, the daughter of a jeweller, around 1643. The couple lived on the Molenwater in Middelburg. They had three children. Jacob was born in 1645 and became a ship’s surgeon. Johannes Jr. was born in 1656 and rose to be a lieutenant in the army of William III, the Dutch Stadholder and King of England. The couple also had a daughter but her name and details are unknown. Goedaert died in January 1668 after an active life and was buried in the Nieuwe Kerk in his home town of Middelburg on 15 January 1668.

In 1669, about eighteen months after Goedaert’s death, Jan Swammerdam (1637–1680) published his book Historia Insectorum Generalis, in which he wrote that Goedaert had observed and described more insects than anyone before him. However, Swammerdam then went on to criticize Goedaert’s work.
