= Isaac Walraven =

Dutch painter (1686 – 1765)

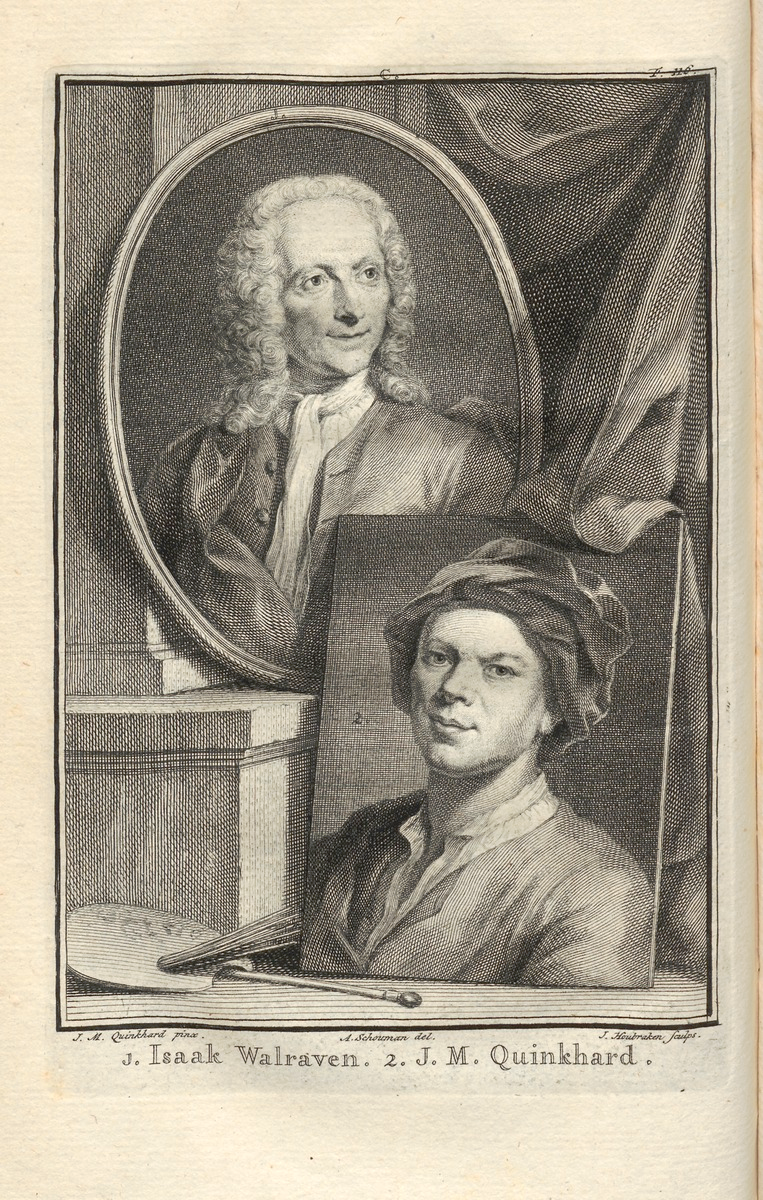
Isaac Walraven (left) portrayed with Jan Maurits Quinckhard in Jan van Gool's Nieuwe Schouburg

Isaac Walraven (1686–1765) was an 18th-century painter from the Dutch Republic.

== Biography ==
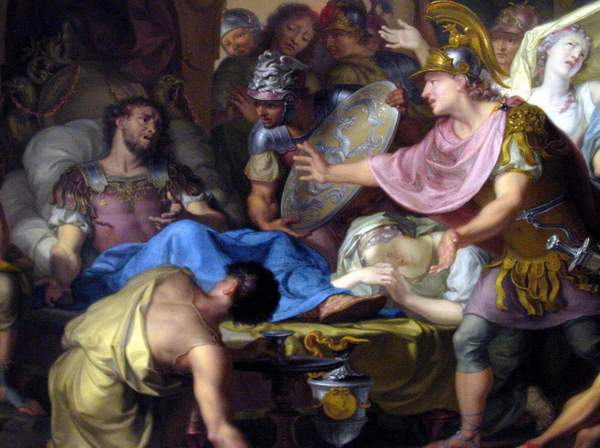
Detail of historical allegory of the death of Epaminondas

According to the RKD, he was a pupil of Jan Ebbelaar and the history painter Gerrit Rademaker. He made copies of old masters and was a jeweler and etcher as well as a painter.

He died in Amsterdam.
