= Gerhard Jan Palthe =

Dutch painter

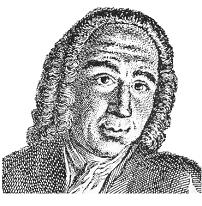
Gerard Jan Palthe based on a self-portrait by candlelight, engraving from Jan van Gool's Nieuwe Schouburg, 1750

Gerhard Jan Palthe (21 July 1681 – 30 July 1767) was an 18th-century painter and portraitist from the Dutch Republic.

== Biography ==
He was born in Denekamp as the son of a clergyman of the Walloon church. He studied with Jurriaen Pool the younger and also with Gerrit Dou. He worked for a while in Amsterdam, then in Denekamp where he married on 7 October 1714 Lena Leferink, moved to Delden and settled definitely in Deventer. He was a follower of Godfried Schalcken and made scenes by candlelight. but he is better known for his portraits.

He was the father of

- Jan
- Adriaan (born 8 September 1718 Deventer, died 12 July 1774 Spaarndam) secretary to count van Wassenaer Obdam. He travelled a lot which enabled him to develop artistic knowledge. He copied a lot of famous paintings and was a crafty amateur
- Anthony (born 17 November 1726 Deventer, died 3 May 1772 Amsterdam) was also a portraitist but after Van Eijnden et Van der Willigen, was not as good as his brother Jan. Living in Amsterdam he set up a wall paper company which was bought two years after his death by Wybrand Hendricks, who also married his widow.

Gerhard Jan Palthe and his son Jan are often mistaken and paintings ill attributed.
