= Dirk van der Aa =

Dutch rococo painter (1731–1809)

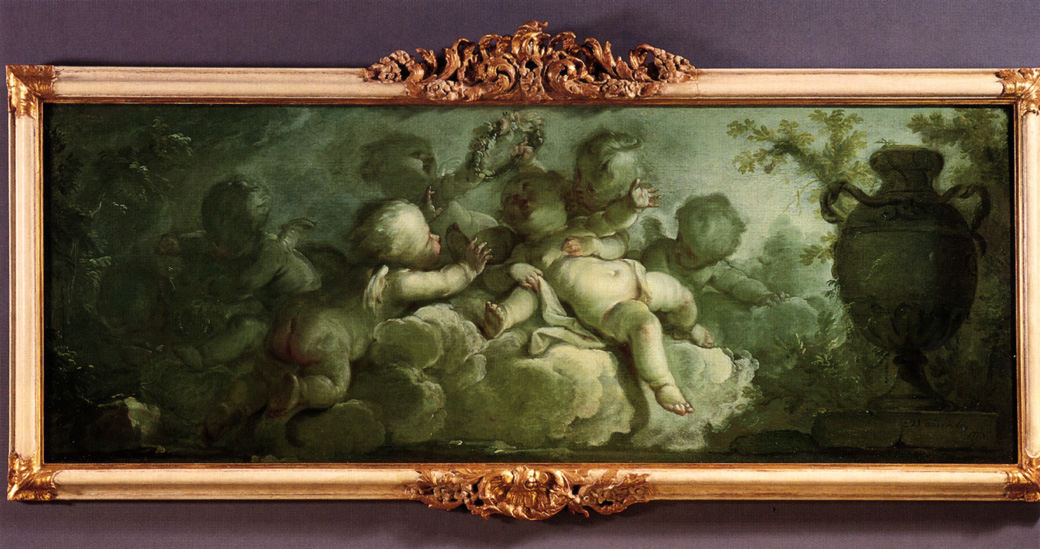
Spielende Putten auf Wolken (Playing Putti on Clouds). Signed and dated "D. Vander Aa/1773". Oil on canvas, 119 x 45 cm.

Dirk van der Aa (1731 – 23 February 1809) was a Dutch rococo painter who is best known for his allegorical work.

== Life ==
He was born in The Hague, and first apprenticed to Johann Heinrich Keller, and then to Gerrit Mes with whom he would later start a workshop; they specialized in grisaille decorative paintings. He counted Evert Morel, Cornelis Kuipers, Johan Christiaan Roedig and Andries van der Aa amongst his students. He died in his home city of The Hague.

== Works by van der Aa ==
- Allegory of Summer: Cherubs disporting in a landscape (1775), part of a pair with Allegory of Autumn view at Artnet
- Spielende Putten auf Wolken (Playing Putti on Clouds) (1773)
- An overdoor: Putti desporting on clouds by a vase on pedestal (1773) view at Artnet
- Spielende Putten, Allegorie des Sommers (Playing Putti, allegory of summer), attributed to Dirk van der Aa view at Artnet
