= Christoffel van den Berghe =

Painter from the Northern Netherlands (1590-1645)

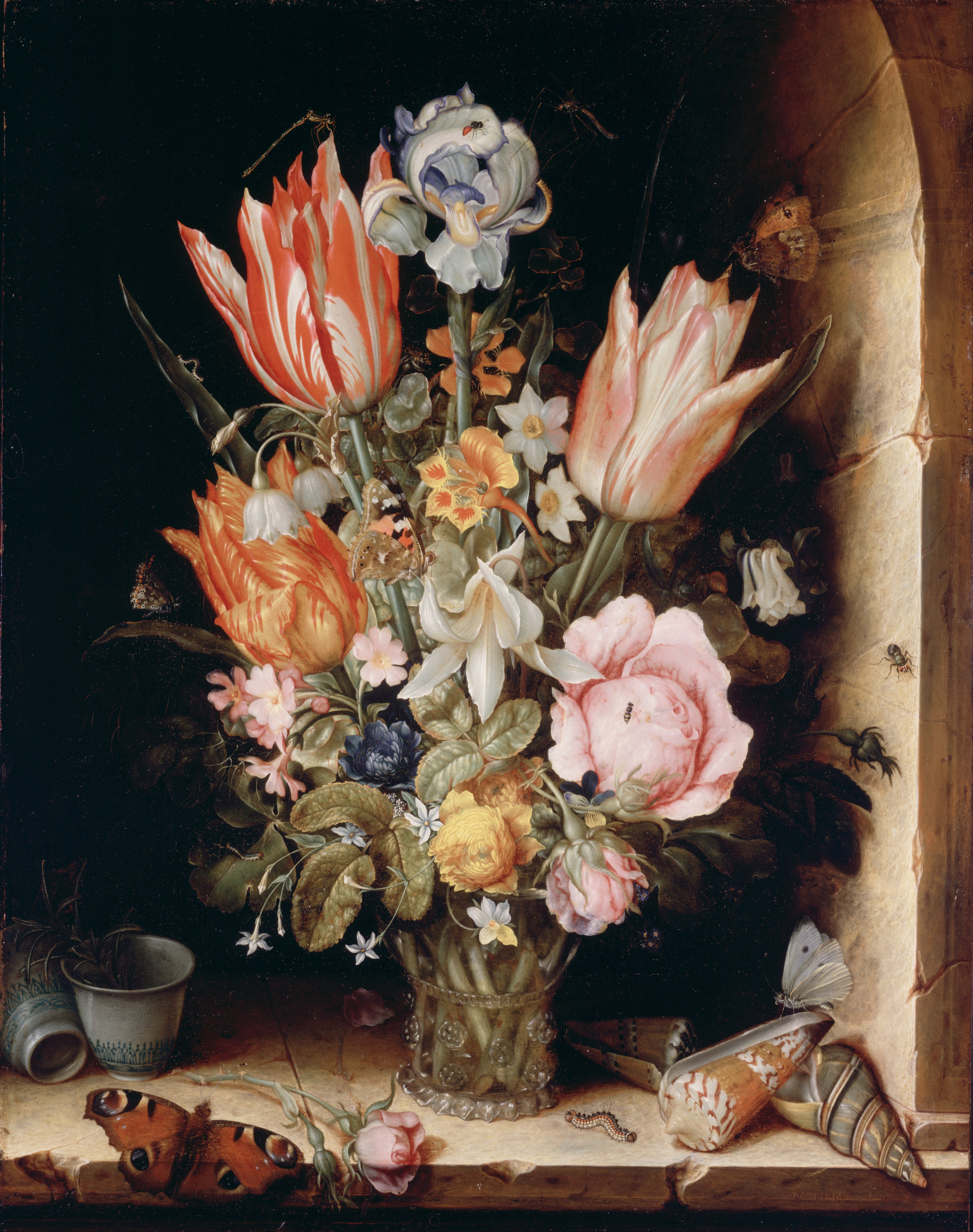
Still Life with Flowers in a Vase, Philadelphia Museum of Art, 1617

Christoffel van den Berghe (he used the monogram CvB) (c. 1590, Antwerp – c. 1645, Middelburg) was a Flemish-born Dutch Golden Age painter of landscapes and flower still lifes.

== Life ==
Very little is known about Van Den Berghe, as he was only rediscovered as an independent artist in the 1950s, when some works formerly attributed to other artists were reattributed to him. It is believed that he was born in Antwerp , and that his family left Flanders to settle in Middelburg. He may have trained under Ambrosius Bosschaert. In 1619, he registered in the Guild of St. Luke in Middelburg; and later on, in 1621, he was dean of the Guild. In 1621, he bought a house in Middelburg; which he still owned in 1628.

Johannes Goedaert was his pupil.

== Work ==
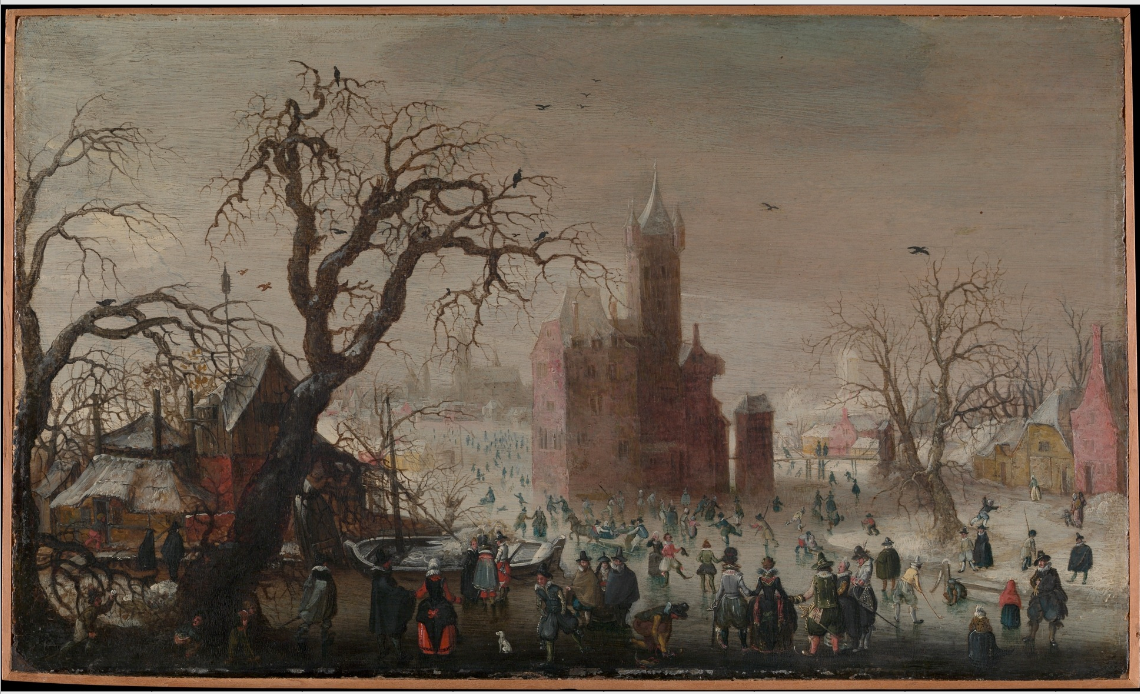
A Winter Landscape with Ice Skaters and an Imaginary Castle, The Metropolitan Museum of Art, c. 1615–20

One of Christoffel's works, Still Life with Dead Birds, is considered one of the earliest paintings of the Dutch genre "game pieces."

He primarily painted in two genres: landscapes and flower still lifes. There are four known examples of flower still lifes by his hand. A flower still life in the Philadelphia Museum of Art is signed and dated 'CV BERGHE 1617'. This flower still life in the Philadelphia Museum of Art shows the influence of Ambrosius Bosschaert (who may have been his teacher) and Roelant Savery, two other Flemish-born still life painters who had migrated to the Dutch Republic. His other flower still lifes are similar except for the one held by the Getty Museum, which is signed and dated 'Cv berghe 1624' and a vanitas still life with a skull, shell and a vase of flowers.

A 'Winter landscape' held by the Metropolitan Museum of Art was formerly attributed to Hendrick Avercamp, the pioneer of winter scenes in the Dutch Republic. It resembles another 'Winter landscape' held at the Mauritshuis in The Hague of the same period. The winter landscapes are more reminiscent of similar works painted by Adriaen van de Venne who was Van den Berghe's contemporary in Middelburg. Landscape paintings in Middelburg followed Flemish conventions which explains the earlier attribution of the Mauritshuis painting to Flemish landscape artists David Vinckboons and later to Paul Bril. Van den Berghe painted the figures in his landscapes himself which helps to distinguish him from other artists who would often use specialists for this task.
