= Gerard Wigmana =

Dutch painter

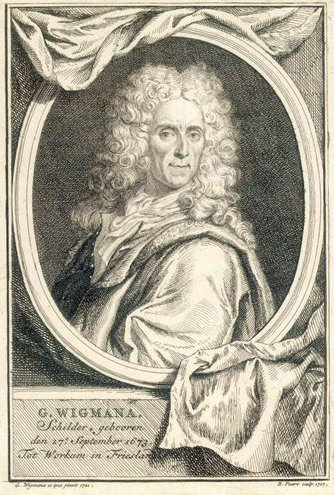
Engraved portrait of the painter Gerard Wigmana, by Bernard Picart in 1727, after a self-portrait in 1722

Gerard Wigmana (27 September 1673 in Workum – 27 May 1741 in Amsterdam), was an 18th-century painter from the Dutch Republic.

== Biography ==
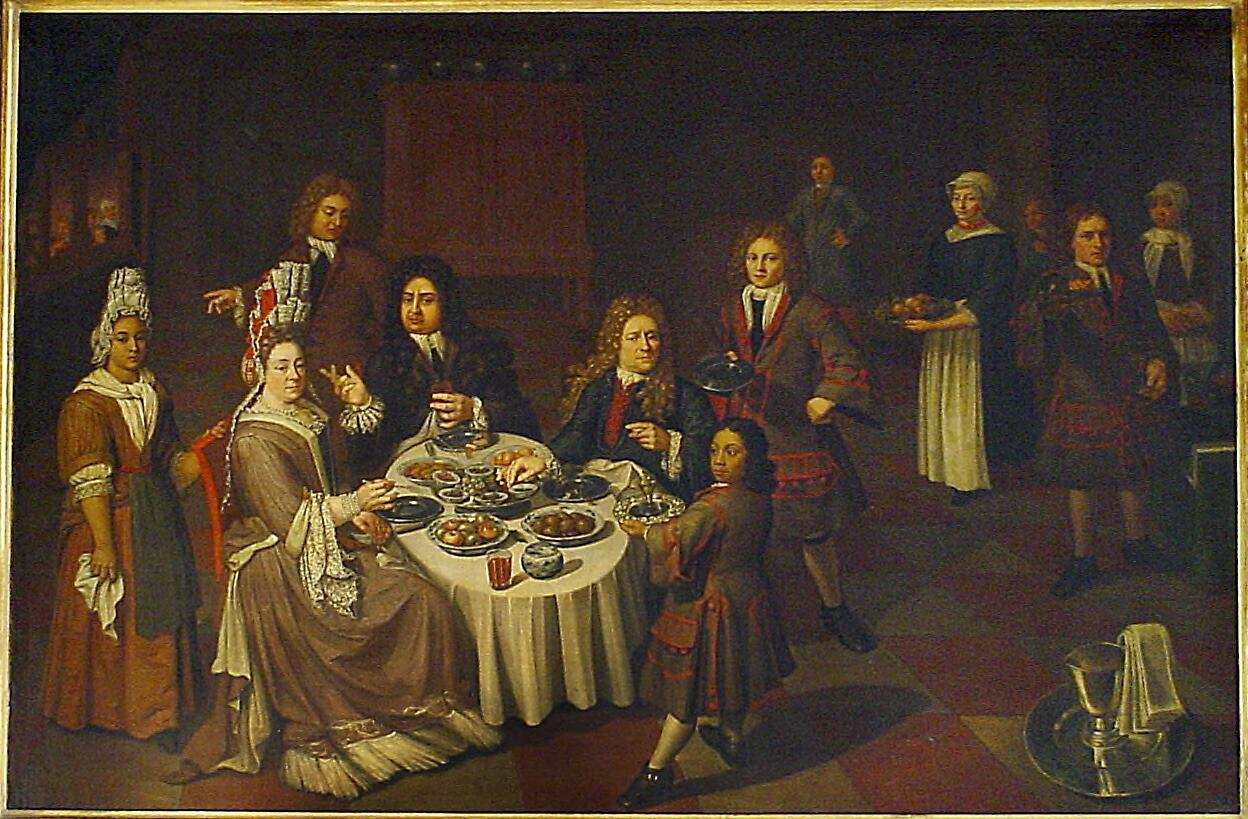
Mayor Saco van Aitzema of Dokkum and his wife offer Tsar Pieter the Great a meal in Amsterdam, 1697

In 1697 he painted a curious group portrait of a family dinner, with the title Mayor Saco van Aitzema of Dokkum and his wife offer Tsar Peter the Great a meal in Amsterdam. He travelled to Rome after that, because according to Houbraken, Wigmana met with the painter Daniel Seiter in Rome in 1699. Houbraken mentioned him again in his biographical sketch of Pieter van Mierevelt, because Wigmana owned one of his paintings. Houbraken intended to write a biographical sketch of Wigmana in his birth year of 1673, but never got that far (he died before publication of Volume III, which ended with birth year 1659). According to the RKD he was a pupil of Jelle Sibrands and travelled to Rome where he received the nickname Friese Raphael. According to Johan van Gool, who called him a narcissus in his biographical sketch of him, Wigmana was in Rome in 1700, but Van Gool did not believe that he got his nickname from joining the Bentvueghels, but rather that Wigmana received his nickname of the Frisian Raphael because he made so many copies of the works of Raphael. Wigmana wrote a book about the art of painting that was published after his death in 1742, and which contained his autobiography with an engraving by Bernard Picart after a self-portrait.
