= Isaac Koedijck =

Dutch painter

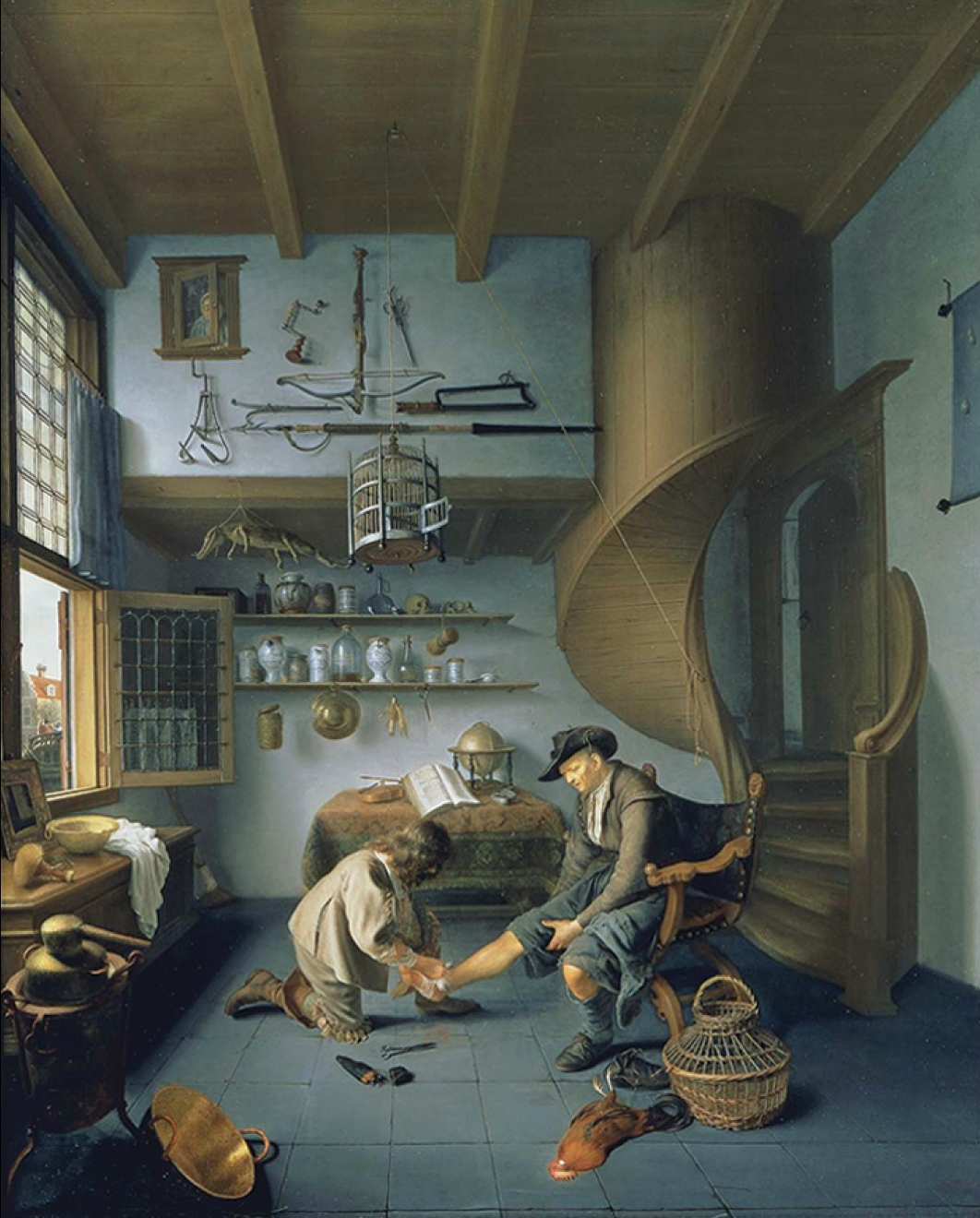
Barber surgeon tending a peasant's foot (c.1649-1650), collection Peabody Essex Museum

Isaac Koedijck (1618 in Amsterdam – 1668 in Amsterdam), was a Dutch Golden Age painter.

== Biography ==
According to Johan van Gool, he saw two excellent cabinet pieces painted in the tradition of Gerard Dou in the collection of Willem Lormier in the Hague, of a farmer being bandaged on his knee in a "barber shop", and a boy stealing some almonds while looking over his shoulder to see if anyone notices.

According to the RKD he worked in Amsterdam (and Haarlem), Indonesia, and India. He is known for genre works and portraits.
