= Jan Adriaensz van Staveren =

Dutch Golden Age painter

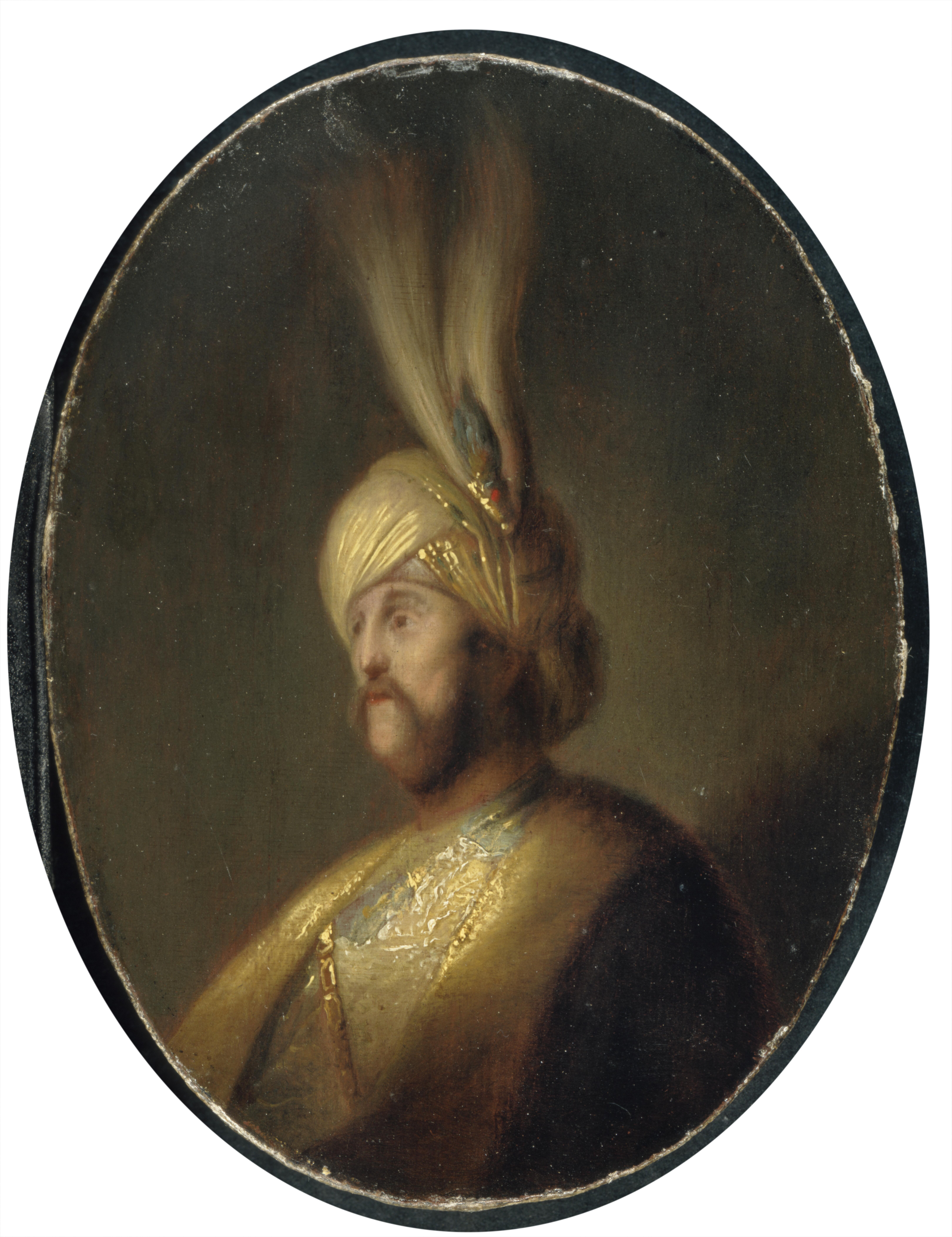
Man wearing turban; this is the Leiden man often referred to as "Rembrandt's father"

Jan Adriaensz. van Staveren (1614 in Leiden – 1669 in Leiden), was a Dutch Golden Age painter of the Leiden school of fijnschilders.

According to the RKD he was fourteen when he entered his name in 1628 in the Leiden University Album Studiosorum, and he paid dues to the Leiden Guild of St. Luke in the years 1644–1669. He is known for genre works, landscapes, and portraits.
