= Pieter van Mierevelt =

Dutch Golden Age painter

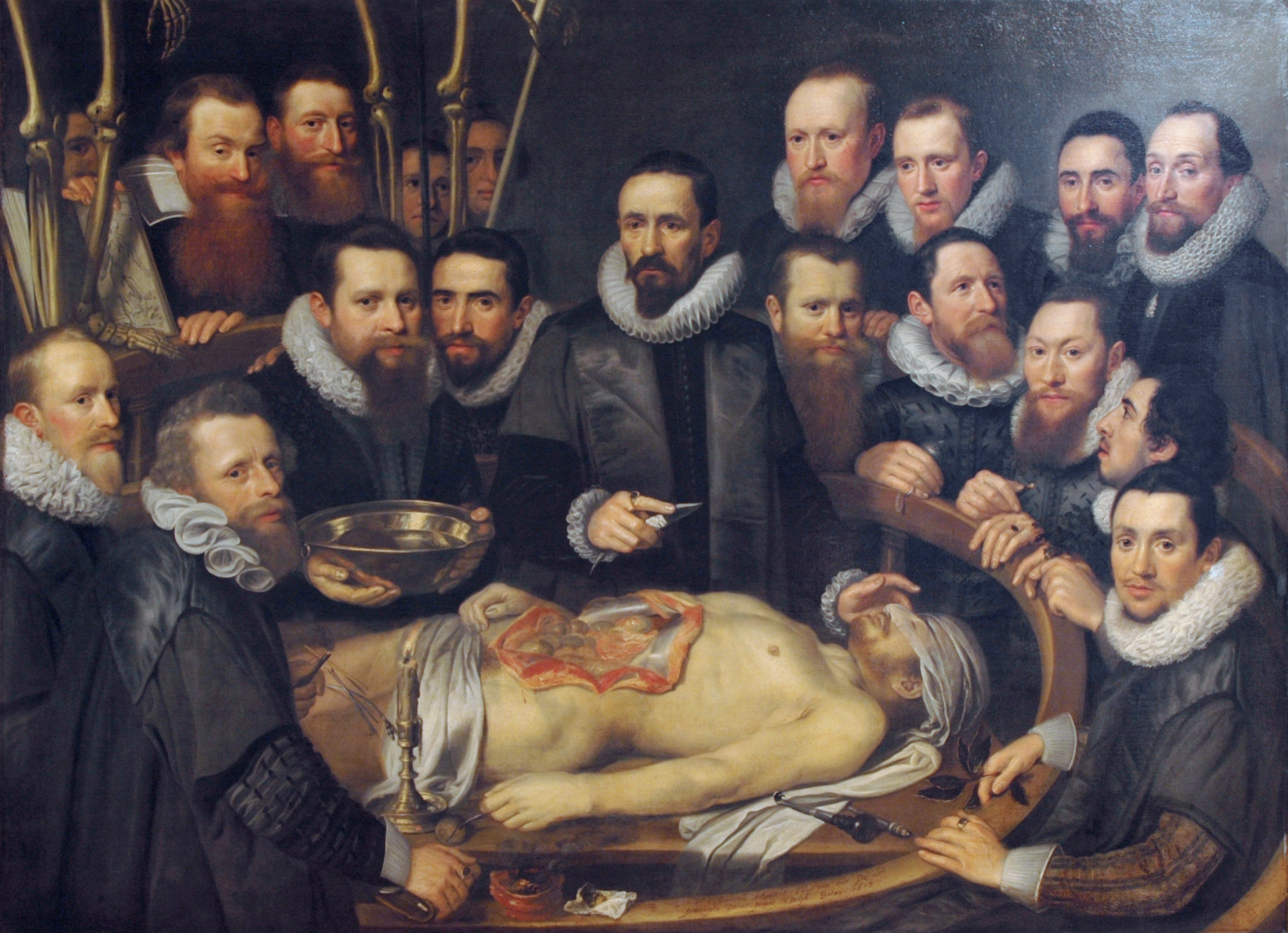
Anatomy lesson of Dr. Willem van der Meer, 1617

Pieter Mierevelt (October 5, 1596 – January 11, 1623) was a Dutch Golden Age painter.

== Biography ==
Mierevelt was born in the city of Delft. According to Houbraken he was one of two sons of Michiel Jansz van Mierevelt who died early, whose works were such that they could easily pass for his father's. Houbraken discovered him when he saw a portrait at the home of the Friesian painter Gerard Wigmana (who was living in Amsterdam while Houbraken was writing) that was signed with a P and an M entwined with the date 1620. When he got home he looked up Mierevelt in his "Description of Delft" by Dirk van Bleiswijk and discovered he had a son Pieter who died in Delft in 1623 at the age of 27. Mierevelt's other son was Jan, who also died young in 1633.

According to the RKD he painted the anatomie lesson of Dr. Willem van der Meer. The only person looking at the doctor is Pieter Mierevelt himself.
