= Bernard Accama =

Dutch painter (1697–1756)

Bernardus Accama (1697–1756) was an 18th-century Dutch historical and portrait painter.

He was born in Friesland, possibly in Burum, the son of Aeltje Boetes Nievelt and Simon Accama, the local church minister. He was christened on 12 July 1697 at Burum. He lived much of his life in Leeuwarden. He worked for and executed commissions for William IV, Prince of Orange. However, much of his work was lost during the Revolution of 1795. He was the brother and instructor of the painter Matthijs Accama.

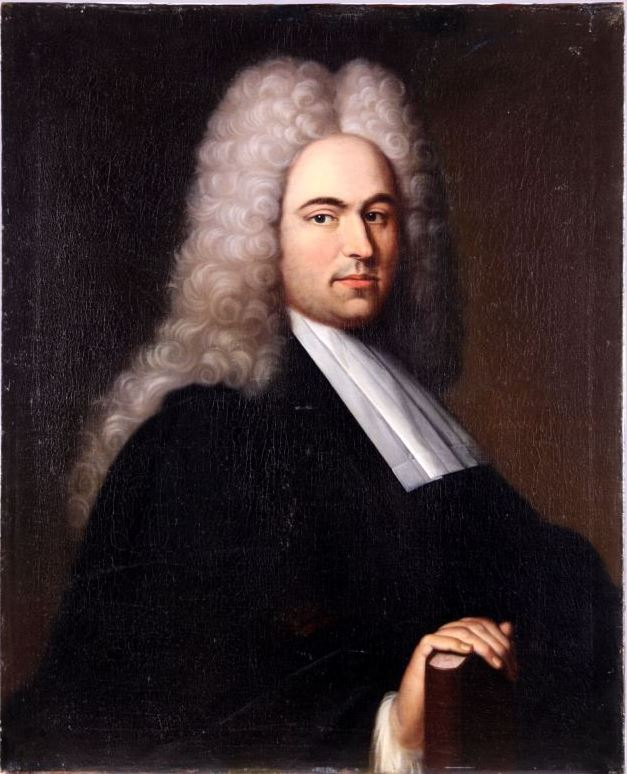
Campegius Vitringa (1693-1723)

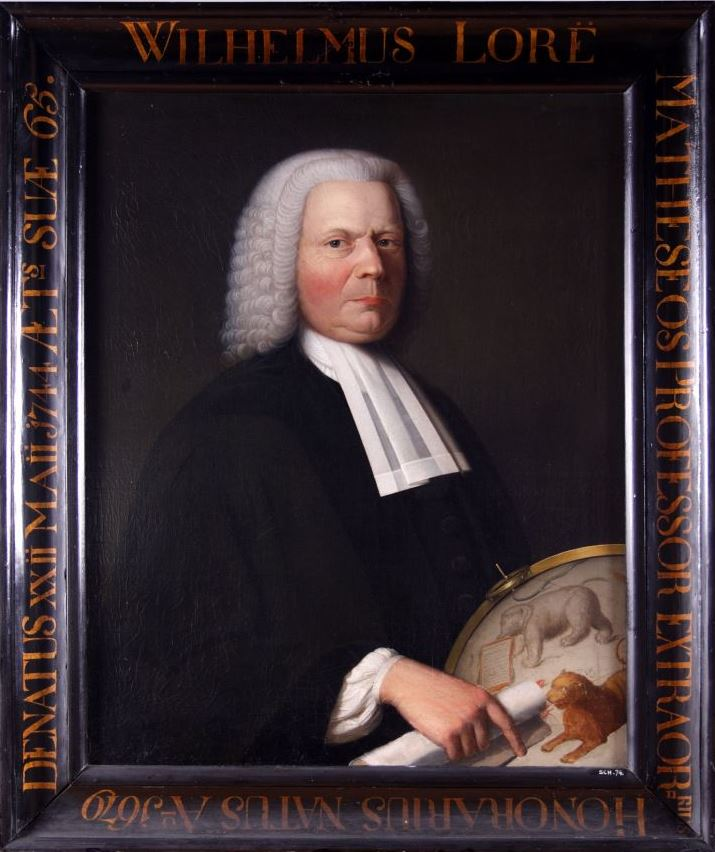
Willem Loré

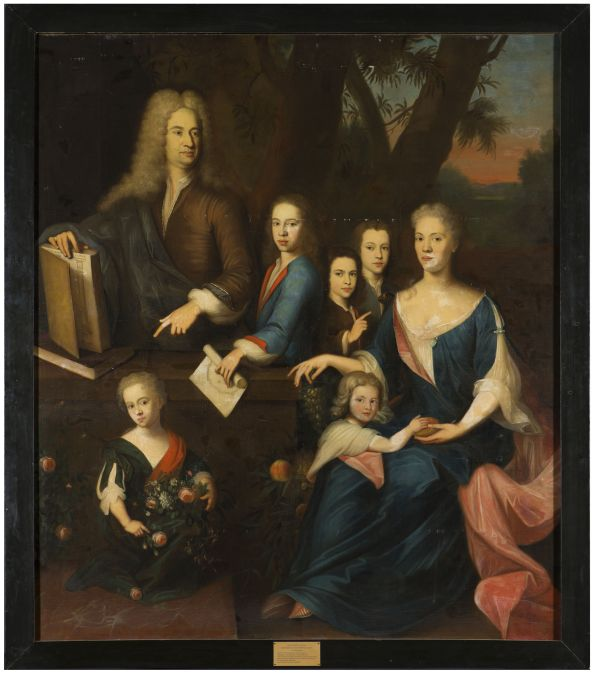
Coulon family

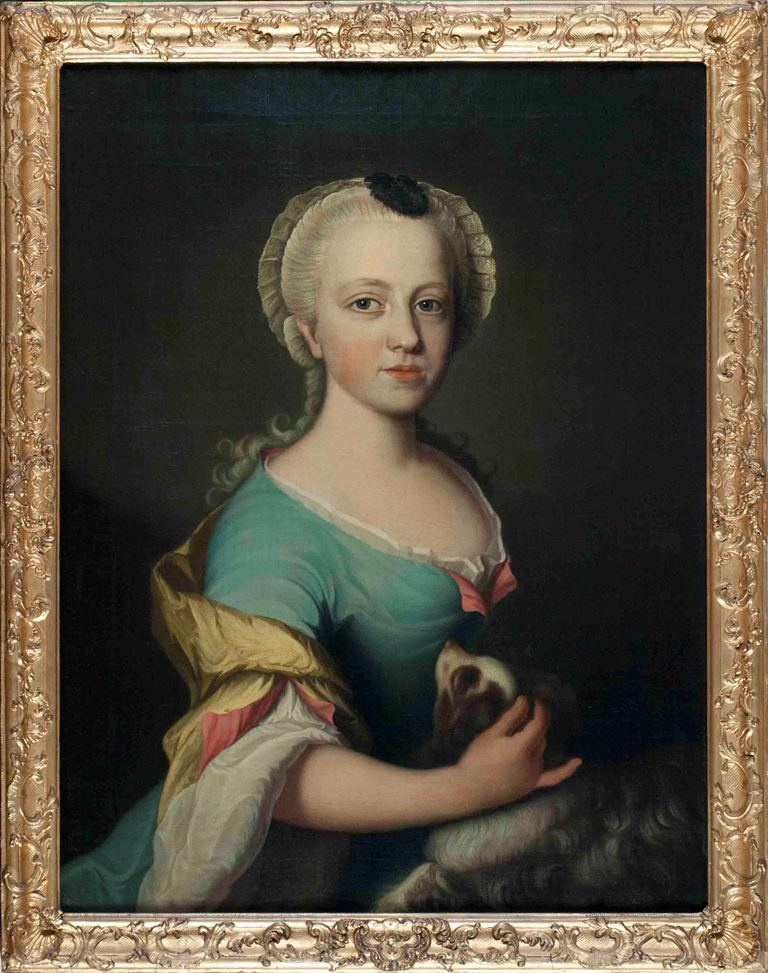
Maria Libora van Haersma

Anna van Hannover, princess of Orange-Nassau (1736)
