= Jan Palthe (1717–1769) =

Dutch painter

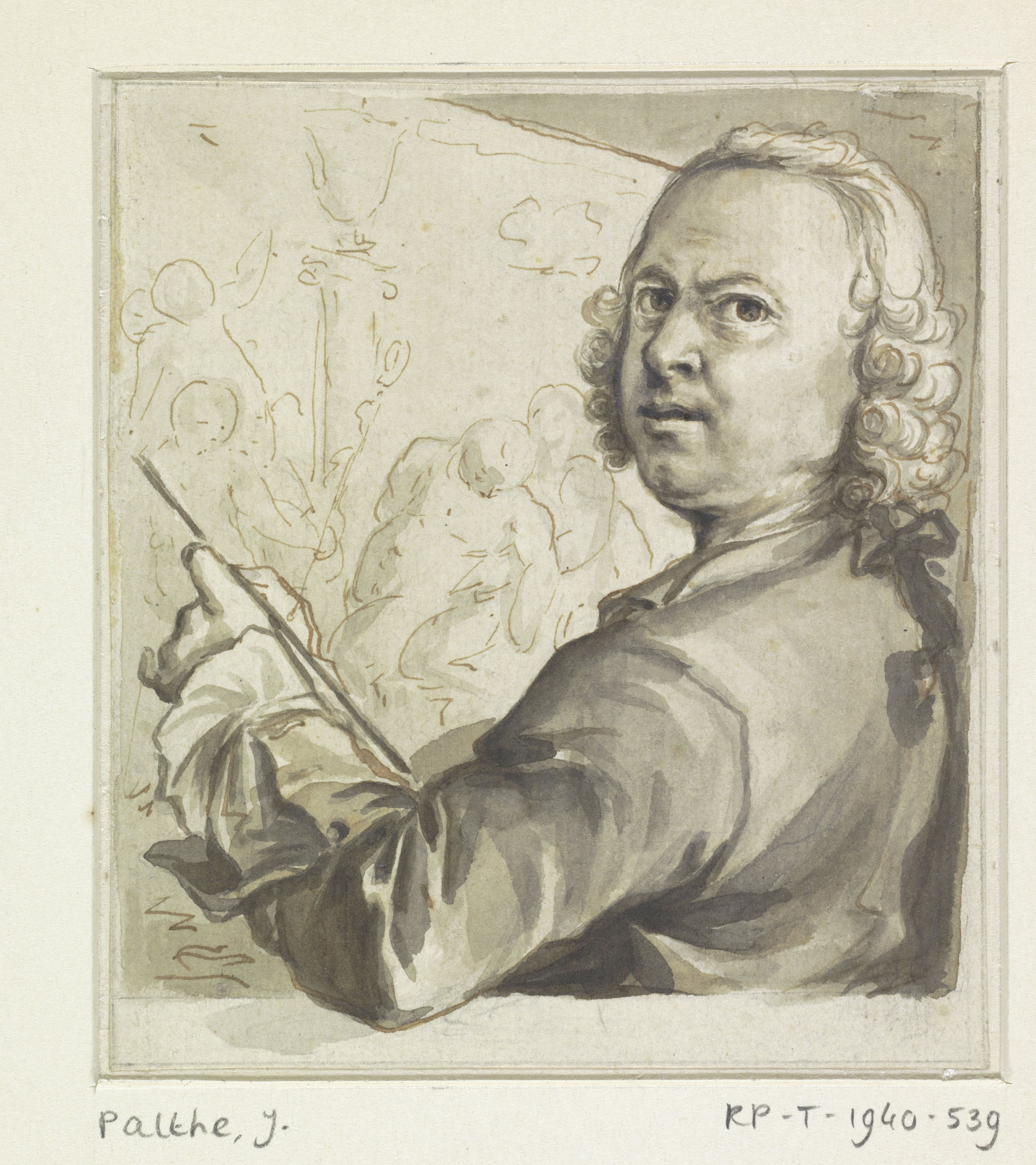
- Self-portrait
- Born: 14 February 1717; Deventer, The Netherlands
- Died: 24 June 1769 (aged 52); Leyden, The Netherlands
- Parent: Gerhard Palthe

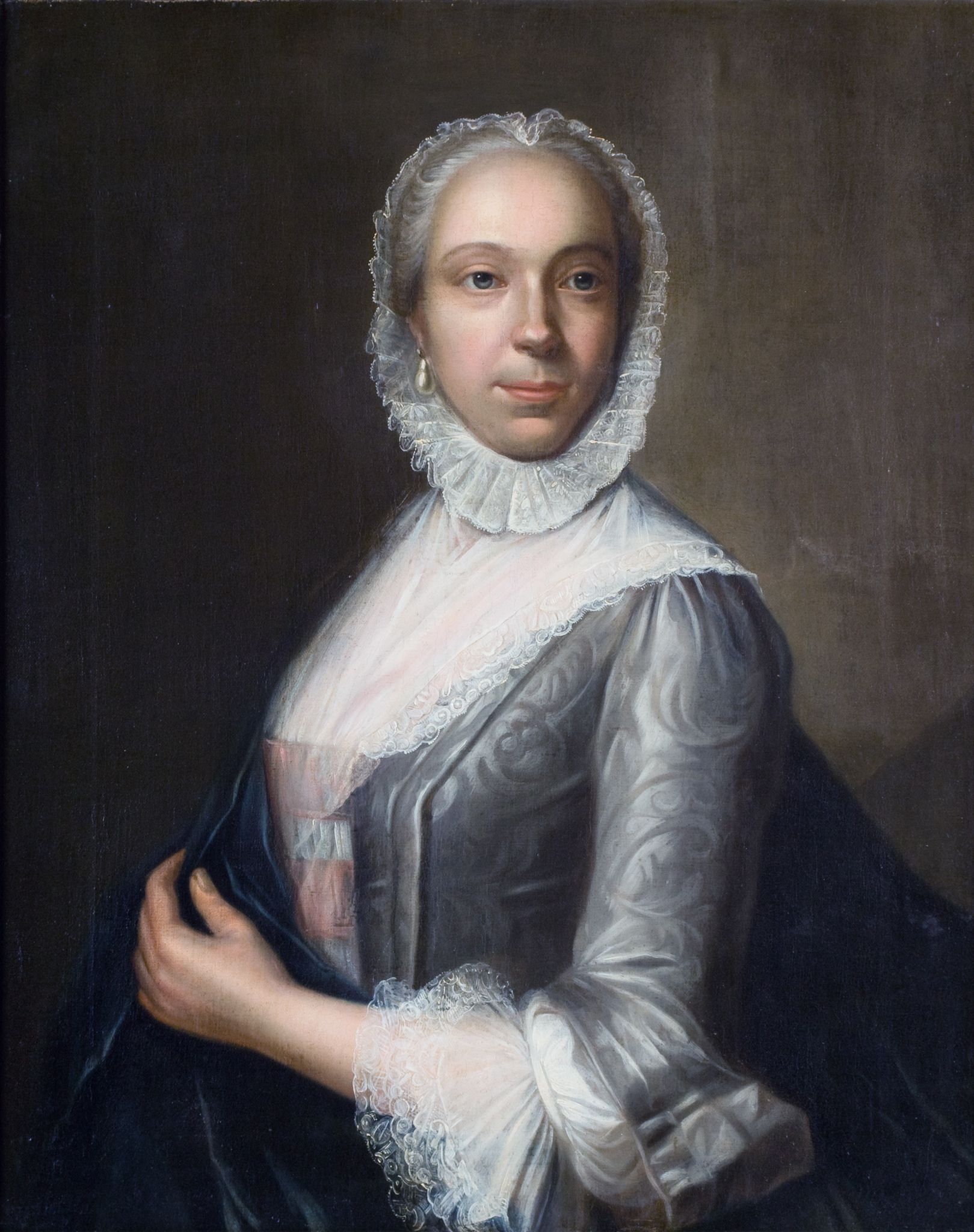
Sara Jacoba Lammers by Jan Palthe

Jan Palthe (14 February 1717 – 24 June 1769) was an 18th-century portraitist from the Dutch Republic.

== Biography ==
He was the son of Gerhard Jan Palthe who taught him to paint. In 1742, he became a member of the Leidse tekenacademie, part of the Leiden Guild of St. Luke. He is known for portrait paintings and etchings. His brother Anthonie, who was also trained as a portrait painter, married Agatha Ketel and began a business in wall paper, a new and popular form of interior decoration. When his brother died, his sister-in-law Agatha married the painter Wybrand Hendricks.

== Exhibitions ==
- Stadhuismuseum Zierikzee (July 2nd- November 9th 2025 catalog (nl)Jim van der Meer Mohr Zeeuwse Portretten uit de Achttiende Eeuw WBooks (Zwolle) ISBN 9789462587076
- het Palthe Huis- Oldenzaal (May 28- August 28th 2000)) catalog (nl) Peggie Breitbarth Jan Palthe Portretschilder 1717-1769
