= Constantijn Netscher =

Dutch painter

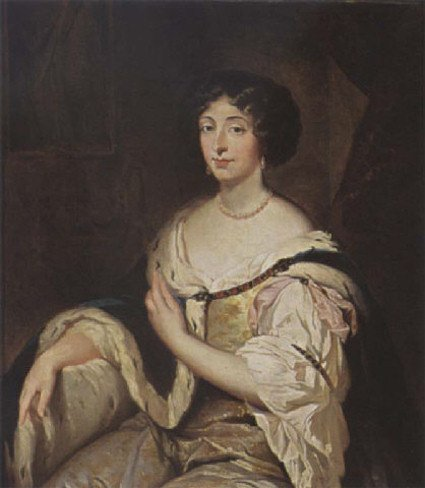
Portrait of Maria Mancini, 1668–1723

Constantijn Netscher (16 December 1668 – 27 March 1723) was an 18th-century painter from the Dutch Republic.

== Biography ==
He was born in The Hague. According to Houbraken he was the son of Caspar Netscher and the brother of Theodorus. He meant to make a biographical sketch of him in his birth year but died before he got that far in his "Schouburg".

According to the RKD he was the son of Caspar and brother to the painters Theodor and Anthonie van Netscher. He became the son-in-law of Johan van Haensbergen when he married 6 February 1709 to Magdalena van Haensbergen. He is known for portraits, historical allegories, and italianate landscapes. He became the teacher of Hendrick Doorschodt, Dirk Kindt, or Kint, Coenraet Roepel, and Mattheus Verheyden.

Netscher died in 1723 in The Hague and is buried there in the Haansbergen family grave in the Kloosterkerk.
