= Johann Heinrich Keller =

Dutch painter

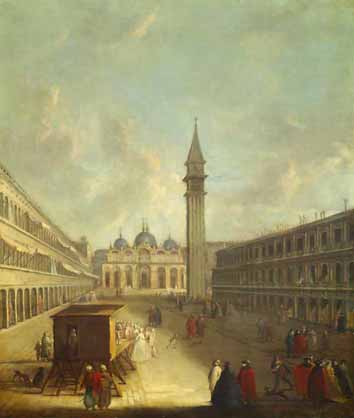
Piazza San Marco

Johann Heinrich Keller (1692–1765) was an 18th-century painter from Switzerland active in the Dutch Republic.

== Biography ==
He was born in Zurich and was initially a pupil of his father Johann Keller, a sculptor. He moved to The Hague and became the teacher of Dirk van der Aa and Cornelis Kuipers. He is known for his wall decorations and in 1751 he worked in The Hague on wall decorations for a mansion on the Lange Voorhout, now called the Escher Museum. In 1753 he made wall decorations for what is now Het Loo Palace.

He died in The Hague.
