= Johannes Vollevens =

Dutch Golden Age painter

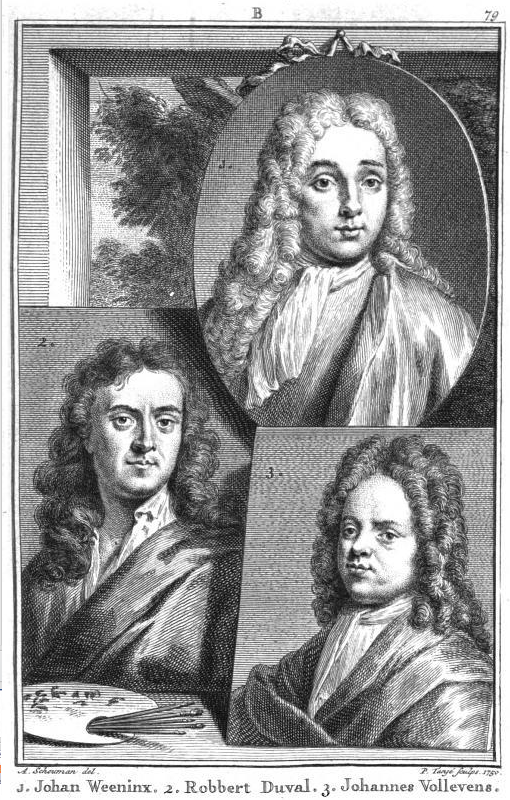
Portrait of Johannes Vollevens (lower right) in Jan van Gool's "Nieuw Schouburg", 1750

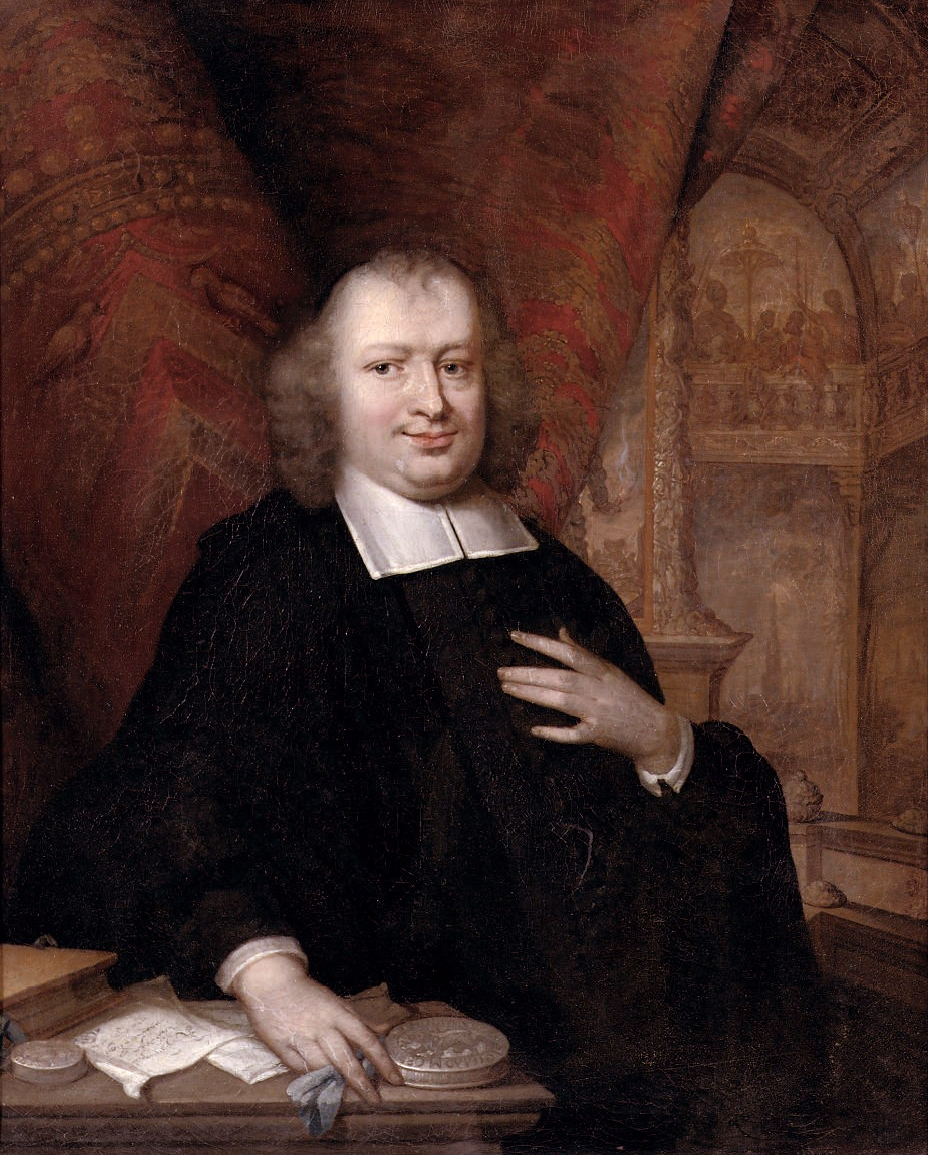
Portrait of Gaspar Fagel, painted by Johannes Vollevens

Johannes Vollevens (1649, Geertruidenberg – 1728, The Hague), was a Dutch Golden Age painter.

== Biography ==
According to Houbraken he was born in 1654, "the same year that took Fabritius by a stroke of fate", and though there were few painters in Getruidenberg to copy from, he sketched and drew in charcoal so enthusiastically that his parents sent him to learn drawing from the famous painter Caspar Netscher. He later took lessons from Nicolaes Maes, and later still, from Jan de Baen in The Hague.

According to the RKD, he was a pupil of Nicolaes Maes in Dordrecht who moved to The Hague in 1664, where he studied with Jan de Baen. Ten years later he joined the Confrerie Pictura in 1674. His son Johannes Vollevens II also became a respected portrait painter.
