= Matthijs Accama =

Dutch painter

Matthijs Accama (1702–1783) was a Dutch painter. The brother of Bernardus, he was born at Leeuwarden, in 1702. He went to Italy, where he copied, with considerable talent, several pictures of the ancient masters. He died at his native town in 1783. He painted historical and emblematical subjects.
