= Coenraet Roepel =

Dutch painter

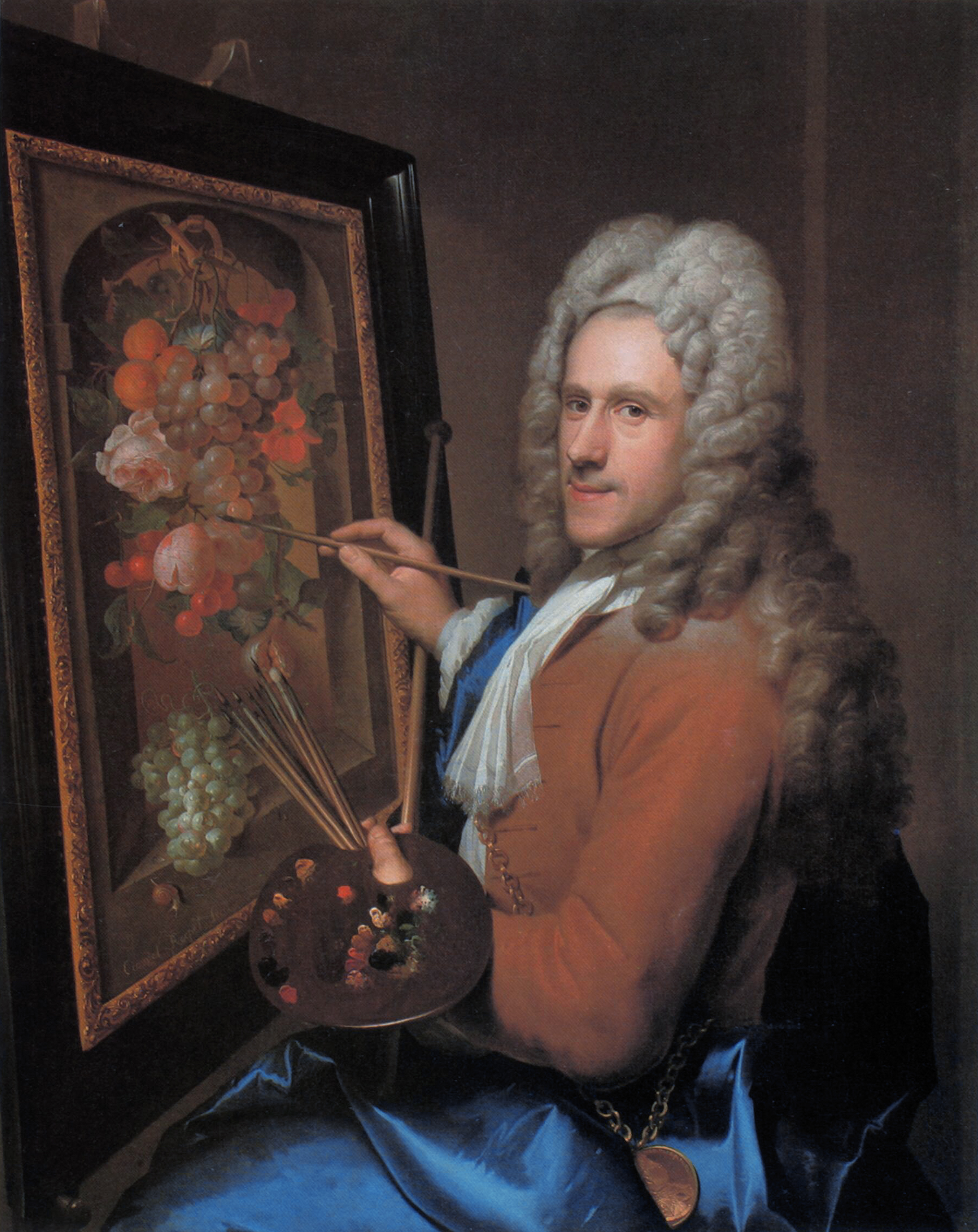
Coenraet Roepel (Richard van Bleeck and Coenraet Roepel)

Coenraet Roepel (1678–1748) was an 18th-century fruit and flower still life painter from the Dutch Republic.

== Biography ==
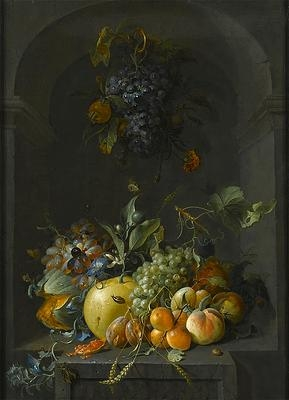
Fruit still life in a niche

He was born in The Hague. According to Jan van Gool he was an avid gardener and his love of flowers made him become a pupil of Constantijn Netscher so that he could paint the flowers and other plants in his garden. He travelled to Düsseldorf in 1716 and received a gold chain and medal from Johann Wilhelm, Elector Palatine for his work. He had high hopes of painting more for the elector, but his patron died the same year, so Coenraet returned to the Netherlands. On his return, he became a member of the Confrerie Pictura in 1718 and was very successful in The Hague, receiving as much as 1,000 guilders for a work, but was later eclipsed by the flower painter Jan van Huysum.

According to the RKD he was trained in the Confrerie in 1698–1699 and first became a member there in 1711. His pupil was Pieter Terwesten. He died in 1748 in The Hague.

The Lazaro Galdiano Museum in Madrid owns a couple of Still lifes, one with fruits and the other a Vase with Flowers, from Roepel.

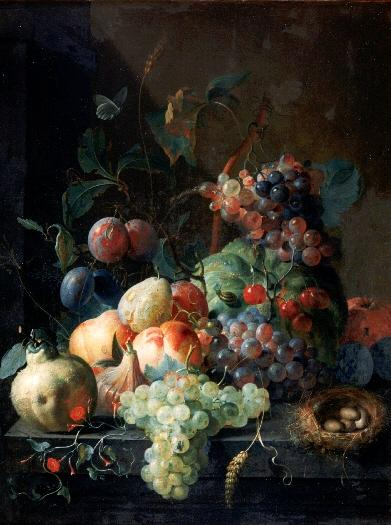
Still life with fruits. Lazaro Galdiano Museum, Madrid.
