= Johannes Antiquus =

Dutch painter

Johannes Antiquus (1702–1750) was an eighteenth-century Dutch painter.

== Life ==
Antiquus was born at Groningen in 1702. He learned the art of glass staining from Gerard van der Veen, and practised it for some years. He then became a student of Jan Abel Wassenberg, a painter of history and portraits, under whom he studied for some time.

He then went to France, where he was much employed as a portrait painter, but did not long remain in Paris, wishing to visit Italy. He lived mainly in Florence, where he was employed by the Grand Duke of Tuscany for six years. His principal work was a large picture of the Fall of the Giants, which was sufficiently esteemed for the sketch of it to be placed in the Florentine Academy. After several years in Italy, he returned to the Netherlands, where he met with a very flattering reception, and was employed by the Prince of Orange, in the palace of Loo, where he painted a large picture of Mars disarmed by the Graces, and several other works. He was a correct draughtsman and a good colourist. He died in Groningen in 1750. His brother Lambertus Antiquus was also a painter.

Works by Johannes Antiquus

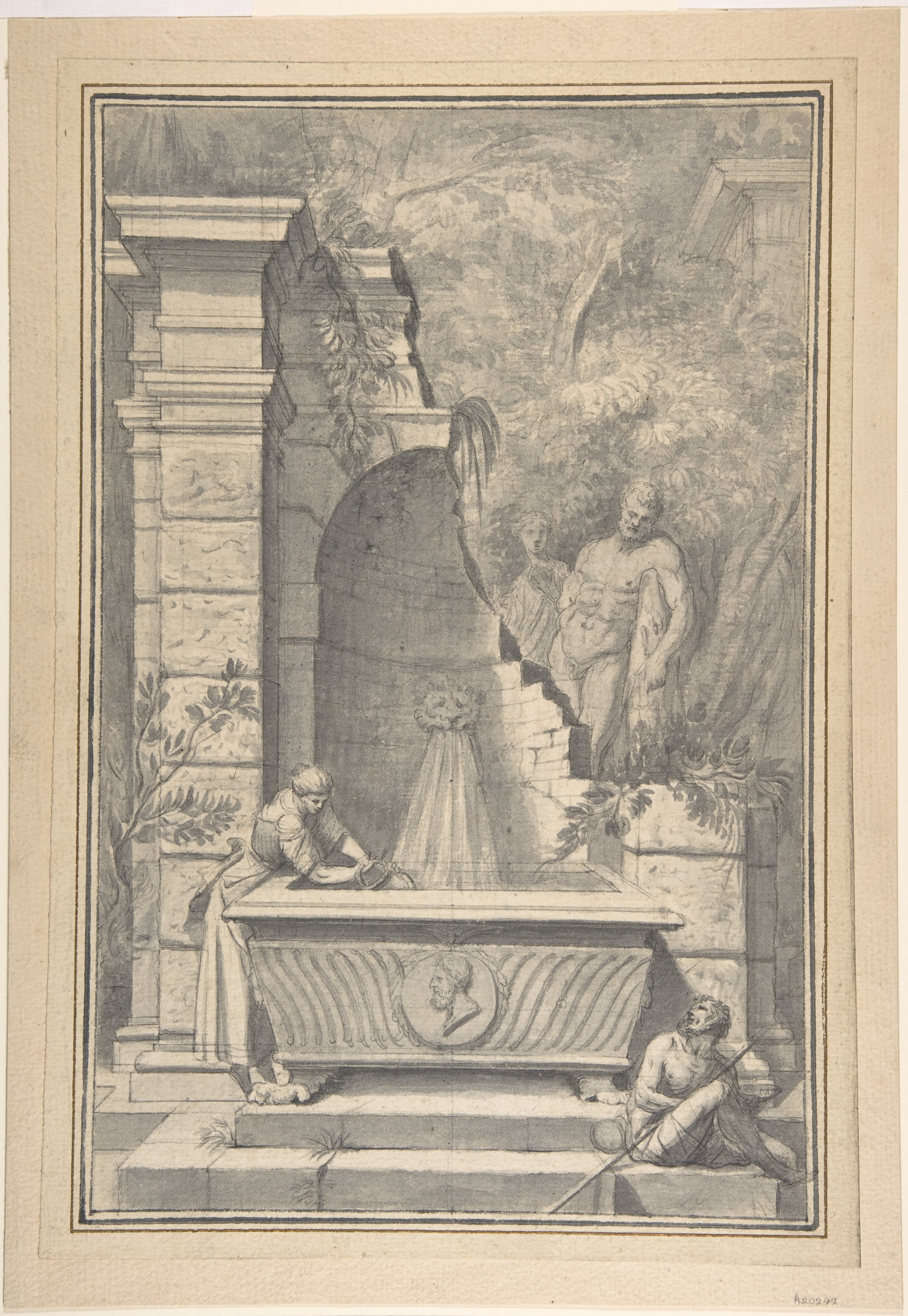

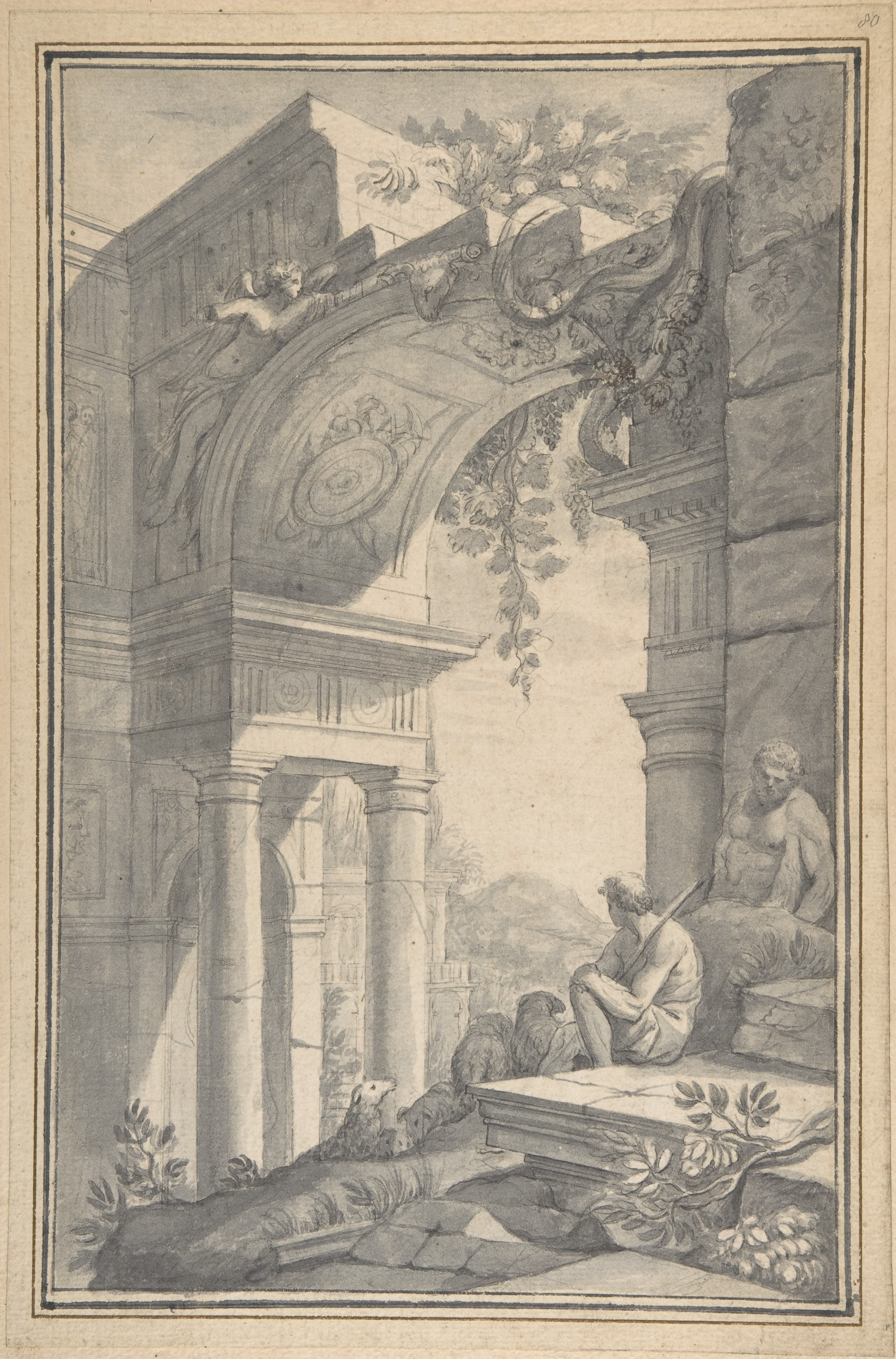

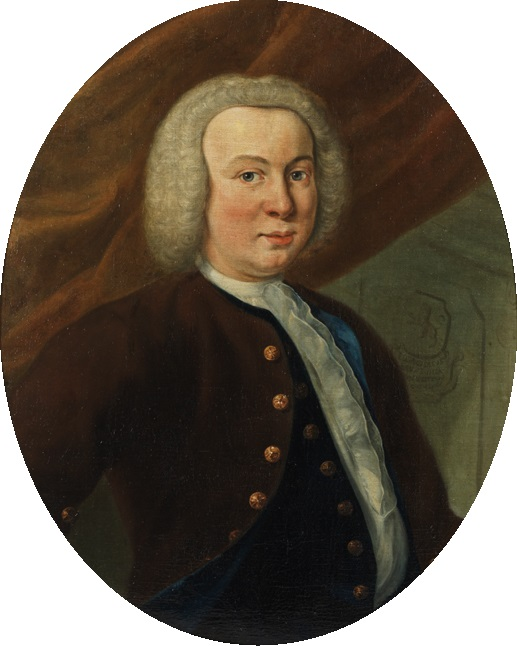

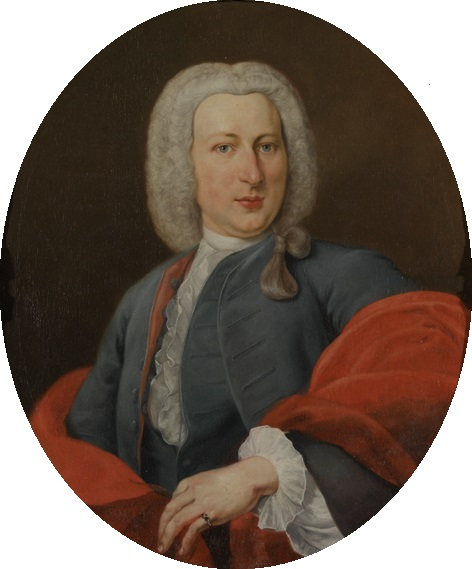

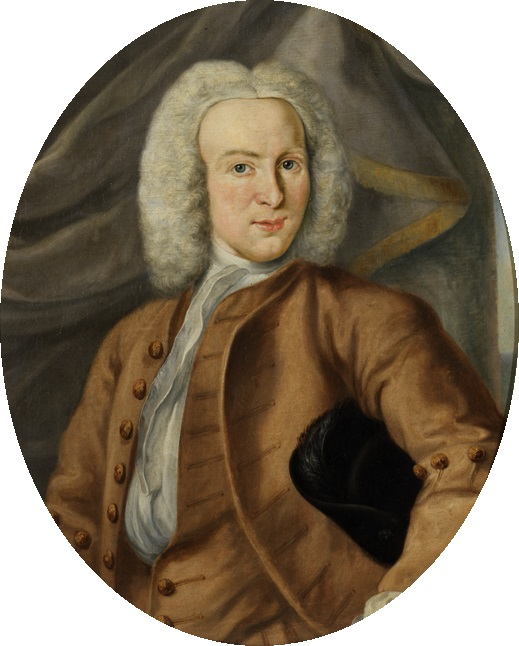

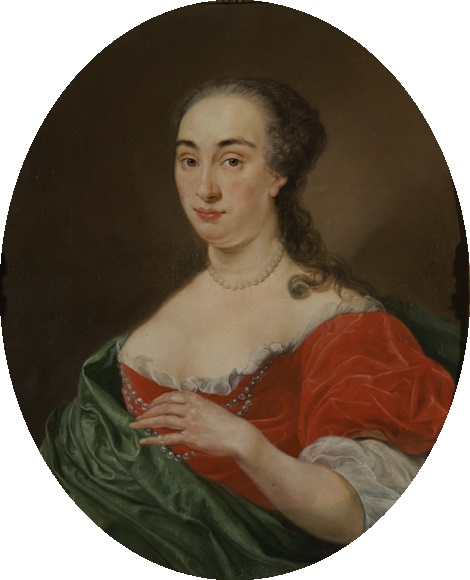
