= Willem Eversdijck =

Dutch painter

- Born: c.1620 Goes
- Died: 1671; Middelburg

Willem Eversdijck (c. 1620-1671) was a Dutch Golden Age painter.

He was the son of Cornelis Eversdijck and flourished at Goes about the year 1660. He is known for portraits and several of these were engraved by Houbraken. In 1633 he was a pupil of Cornelis de Vos in Antwerp. In 1652 he became a member of the Middelburg Guild of St. Luke, where he later died. A picture of Officers and Members of the Company of Archers, called " Edele Voetboog," at Goes, by him, is in the Rotterdam Museum.

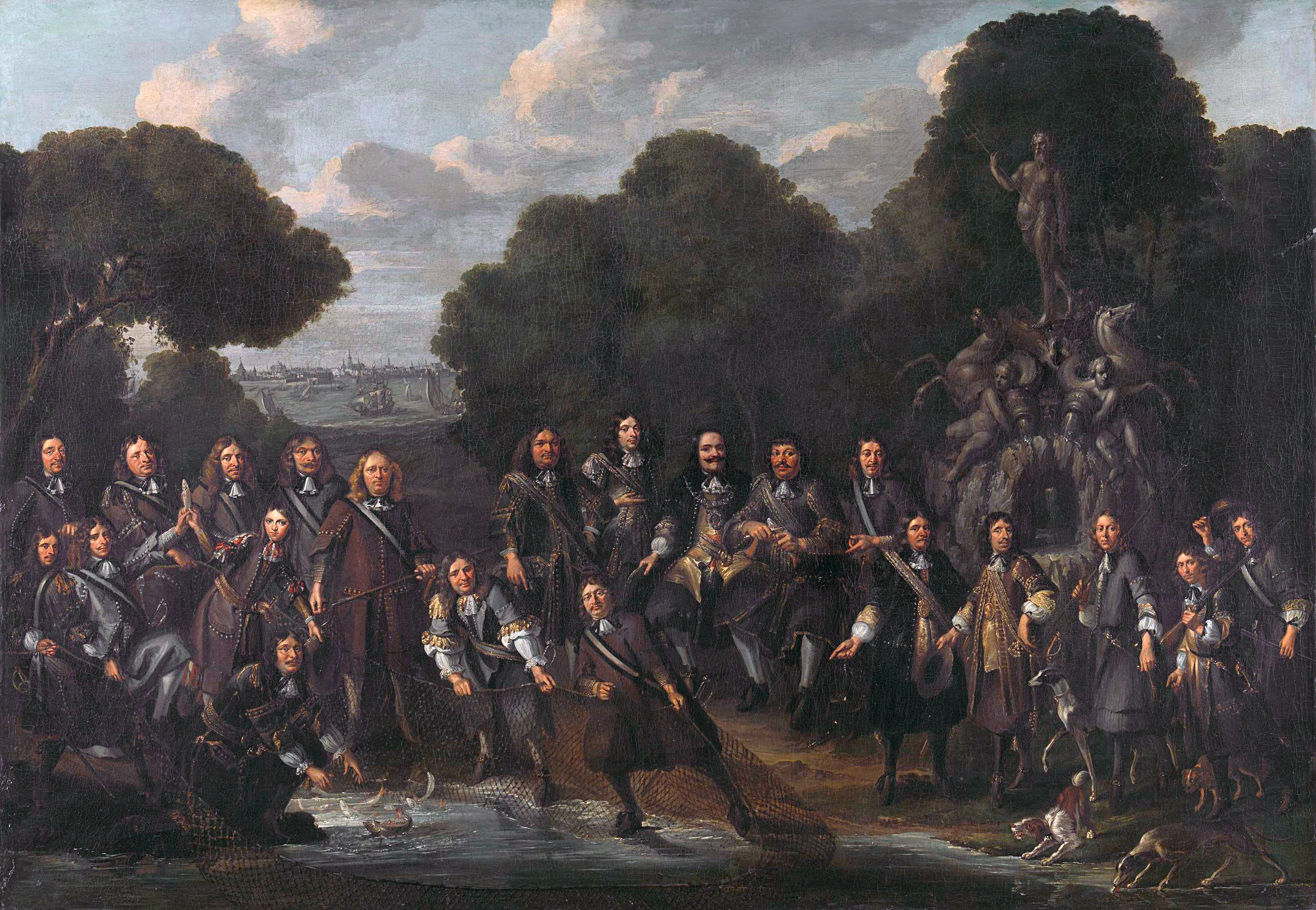
Allegory of fishing, 1667–1671, by Willem Eversdijck, now in the Rijksmuseum Amsterdam

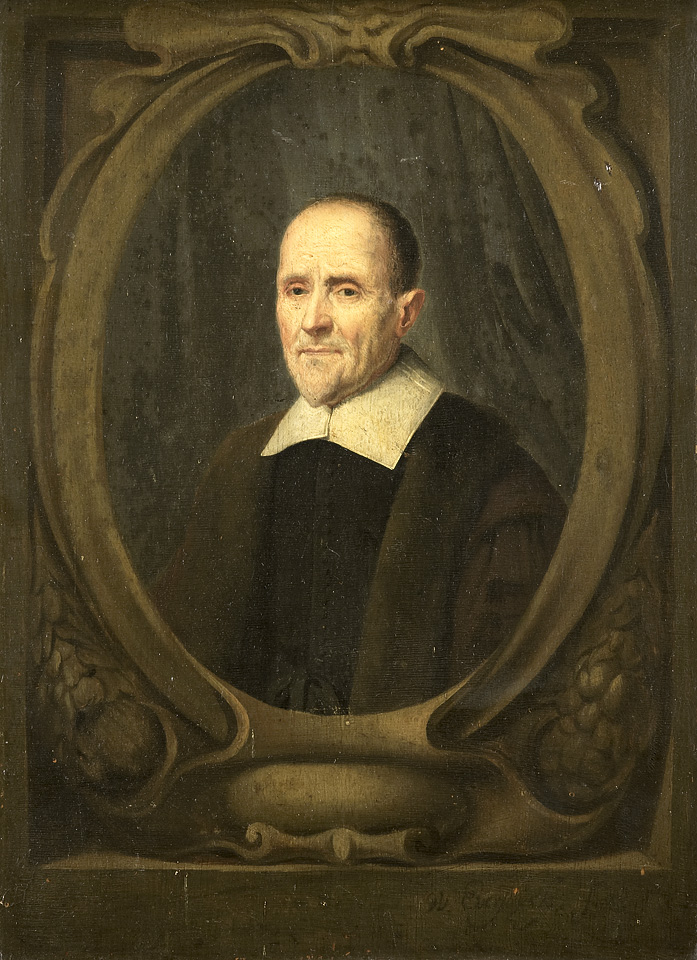
Cornelis Fransz. Eversdijck, Mathematician and treasurer of Zeeland, ca. 1660, by Willem Eversdijck, now in the Rijksmuseum

Cornelis Willemsz Eversdijck, his father, was also a portrait painter of Goes, who died there in 1649. In the Rotterdam Museum are three pictures by him, representing Officers and Members of the Company of Archers, called "Edele Voetboog," at Goes; two of which are dated 1616 and 1624.
