= Johannes Vollevens II =

Dutch painter (1685–1759)

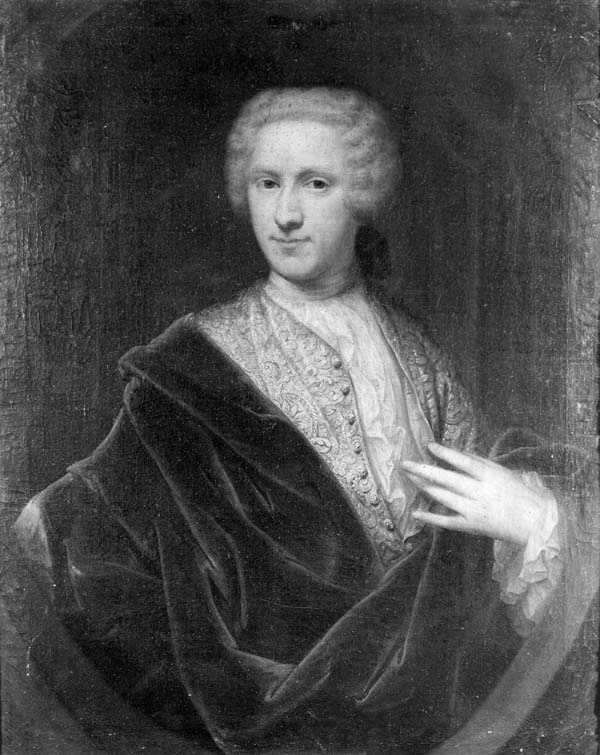
Portrait of Jacob Carel Martens by Johannes Vollevens II, 1734

Johannes Vollevens II (1685–1759) was an 18th-century portrait painter from the Dutch Republic.

== Biography ==
Vollevens was born and died in The Hague. According to Houbraken he learned to paint from his father, Johannes Vollevens. According to the RKD, in 1713 he became a member, and in 1748, he became deacon of the Confrerie Pictura. His selfportrait from 1754 is still in their collection (today the Koninklijke Academie van Beeldende Kunsten KABK). His pupils were Arent Schaasberg and Adriana Verbruggen.
