= Van der Does =

Van der Does is a Dutch surname. Notable people with the surname include:

- Antony van der Does (1609–1680), Flemish engraver
- Eddie Vanderdoes (born 1994), American football player
- Jacob van der Does (1623–1673), Dutch painter
- Jan van der Does, also known as Janus Dousa (1545–1604), Dutch statesman, historian and poet
- Pieter van der Does (1562–1599), Dutch naval commander
- Pieter van der Does (businessman) (born 1968/69), Dutch Internet entrepreneur, co-founder and CEO of Adyen
- Simon van der Does (1653–aft.1677), Dutch painter
