= Teodor Lubieniecki =

Polish Baroque painter and engraver

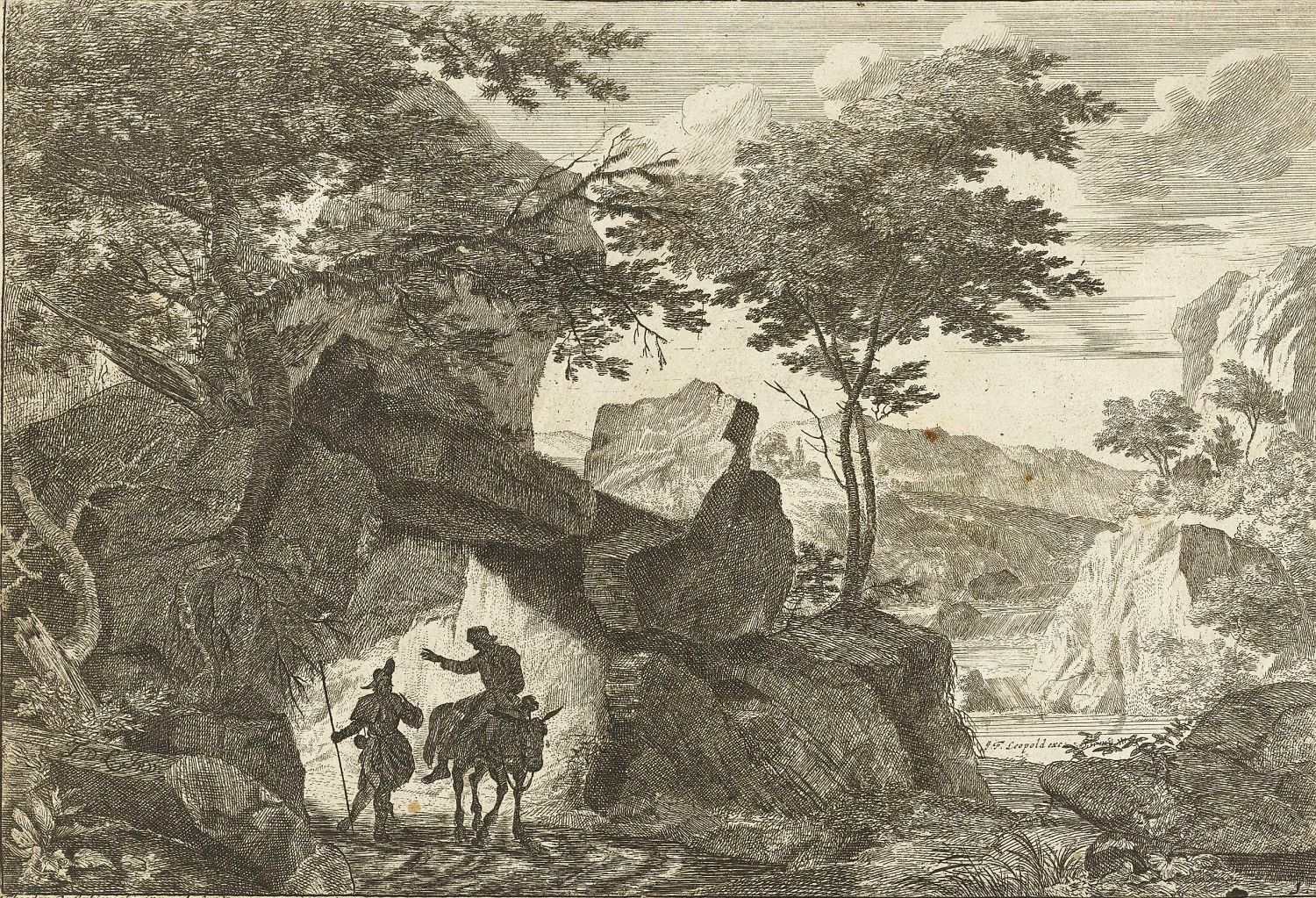
Mountain landscape with two travelers (1698–1701)

Teodor Bogdan Lubieniecki (c. 1654, Czarkowy – 1718, Nowy Korczyn) was a Polish Baroque painter and engraver.

== Biography ==
Teodor and his brother Krzysztof Lubieniecki hailed from an Arian family. They learned to paint from Juriaan Stur in Hamburg. In 1667 they travelled to Amsterdam, where Krzysztof became an apprentice of Adriaen Backer, and Teodor of Gerard de Lairesse. Teodor enjoyed success in Amsterdam and was visited and admired by Cosimo III de' Medici, Grand Duke of Tuscany, who was visiting Amsterdam while on his Grand Tour up the Rhine. In 1682, Teodor moved to Hanover where he found works for the art-loving Frederick William I, Elector of Brandenburg. He was the court painter of the next elector, later King Frederick I of Prussia, who made Lubieniecki the first curator of his Akademie der Künste in 1702. In 1706 Lubieniecki moved to Poland, which is where he later died.
