= Maria Boortens =

- Born: c. 1627; The Hague
- Died: after 1678; Haarlem
- Occupation: Etcher, copper engraver, drawer

Signature
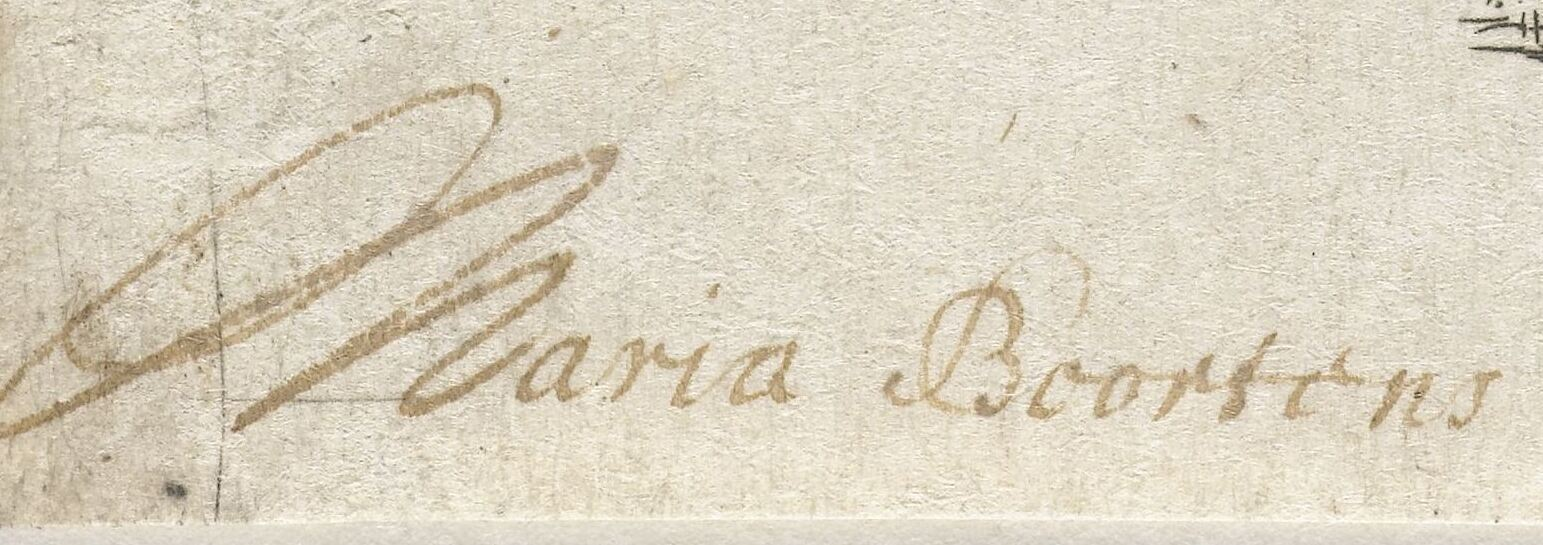

Maria Boortens (1626/7 – after 1678) was a Dutch engraver and artist.

Maria Boortens was born in 1626 or 1627 in The Hague, the third of four daughters of lawyer Dirck Dircksz. Boortens and Maria Loots. In 1652, she married Amsterdam notary Salomon van Nieulandt, son of painter Adriaen van Nieulandt. She was related to two other painters as well; her sister Margareta married Jacob van der Does and her sister-in-law married Salomon Koninck.

Only three works are known by her, which leads scholars to consider her an amateur artist, perhaps influenced to dabble in art by her artistic relatives. Two of her etchings are now in the Rijksmuseum, both copies of etchings by Rembrandt: The Expulsion of Hagar (B30) and Beggars at the Door (B176), the latter signed by her and dated 1658. She also drew a man in green in the album amicorum of diplomat Cornelis de Glarge; the album is now in the Royal Library of the Netherlands.

She had a son, Theodorus, and a daughter, Catharina, before her husband's death in 1656. In 1657 she married Steven Versteegen. The date of her death is unknown, but is after 1678.

== Gallery ==
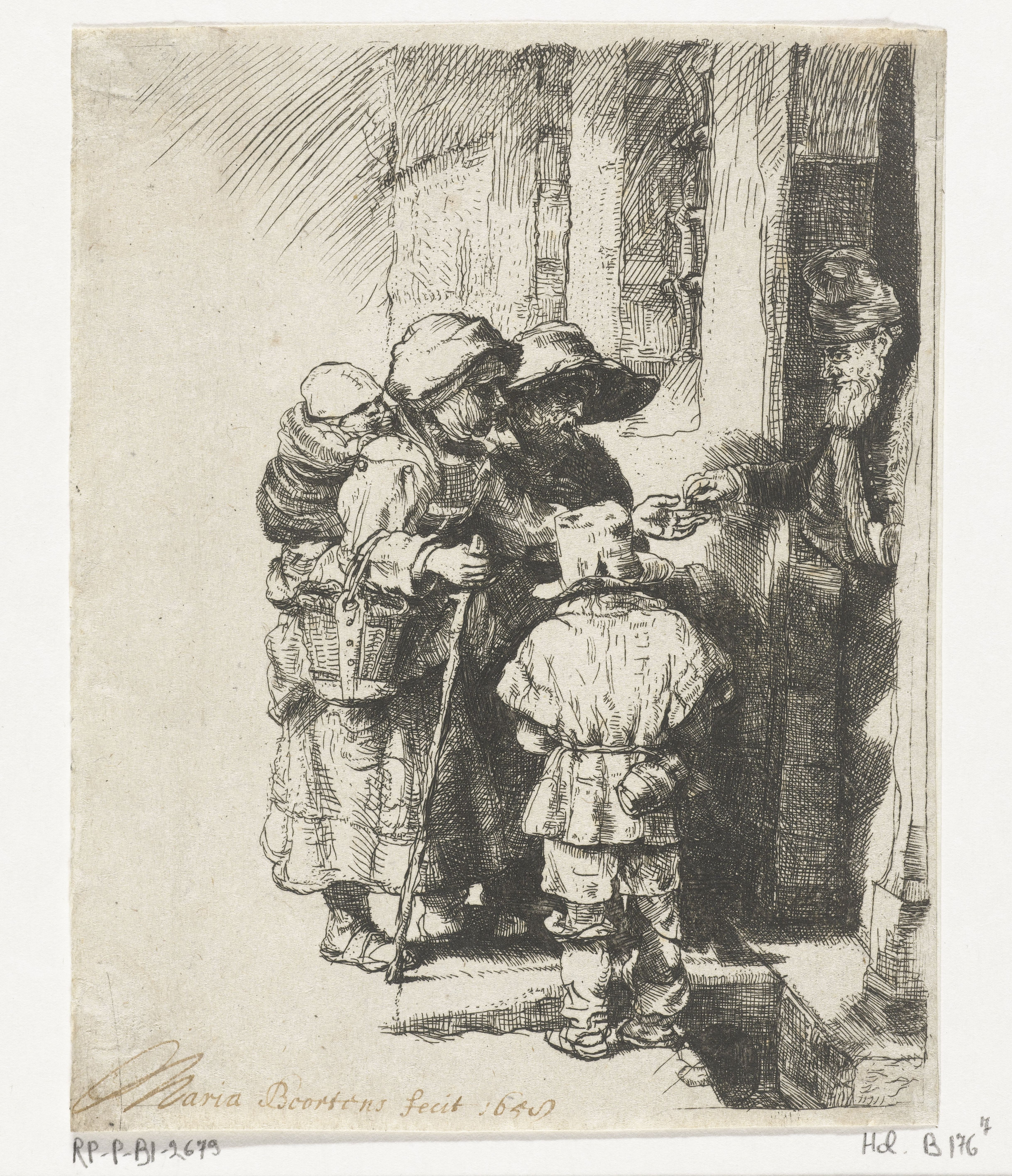
Beggars at the Door, 1658

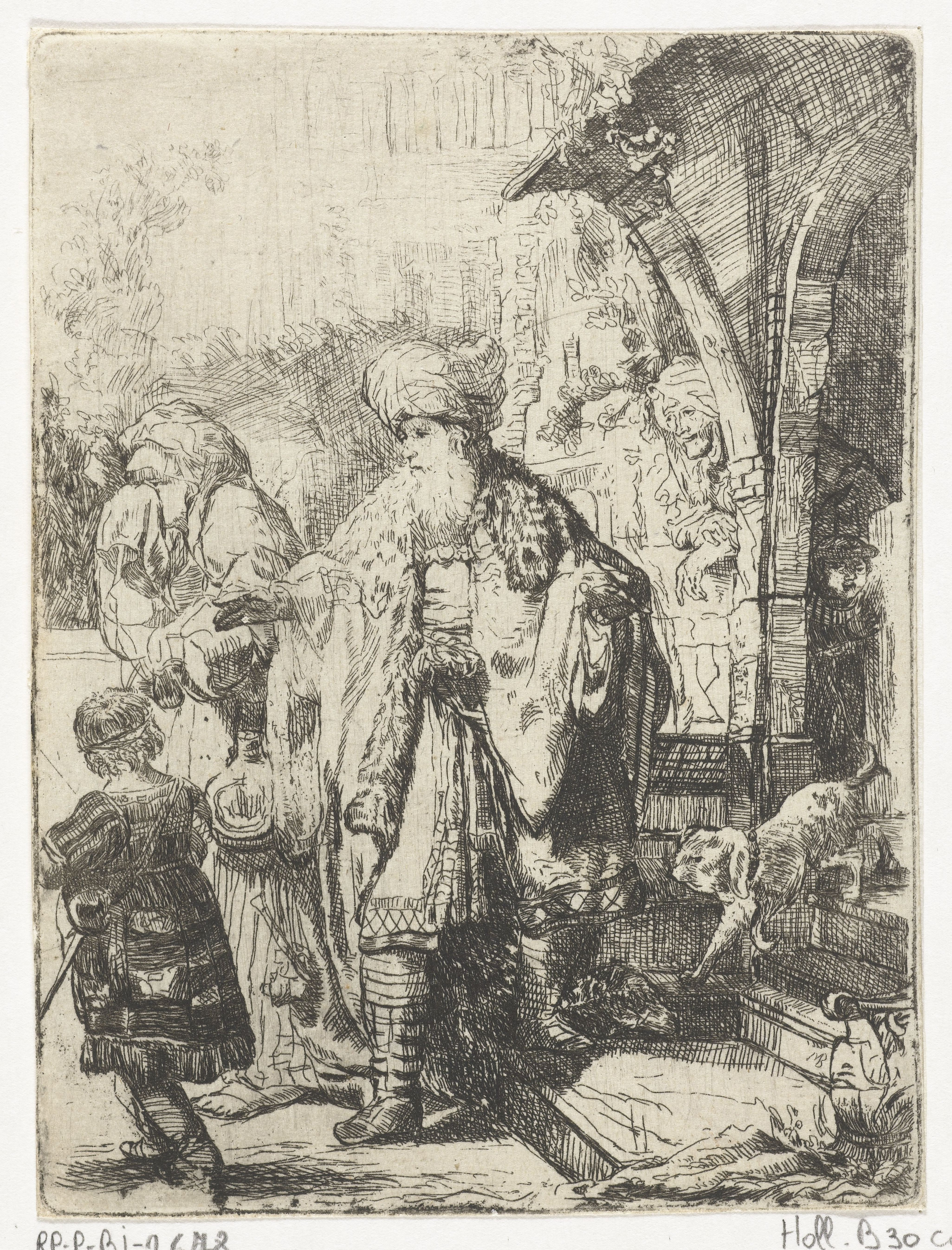
The Expulsion of Hagar
