= Nil volentibus arduum =

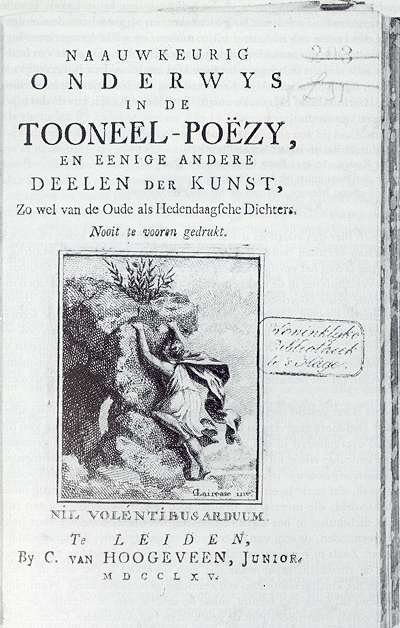
Nil Volentibus Arduum

Nil volentibus arduum is a Latin expression meaning "nothing is impossible for those willing", and the name of a 17th-century Dutch literary society that tried to bring French literature to the Dutch Republic.

== Short history of the literary society ==
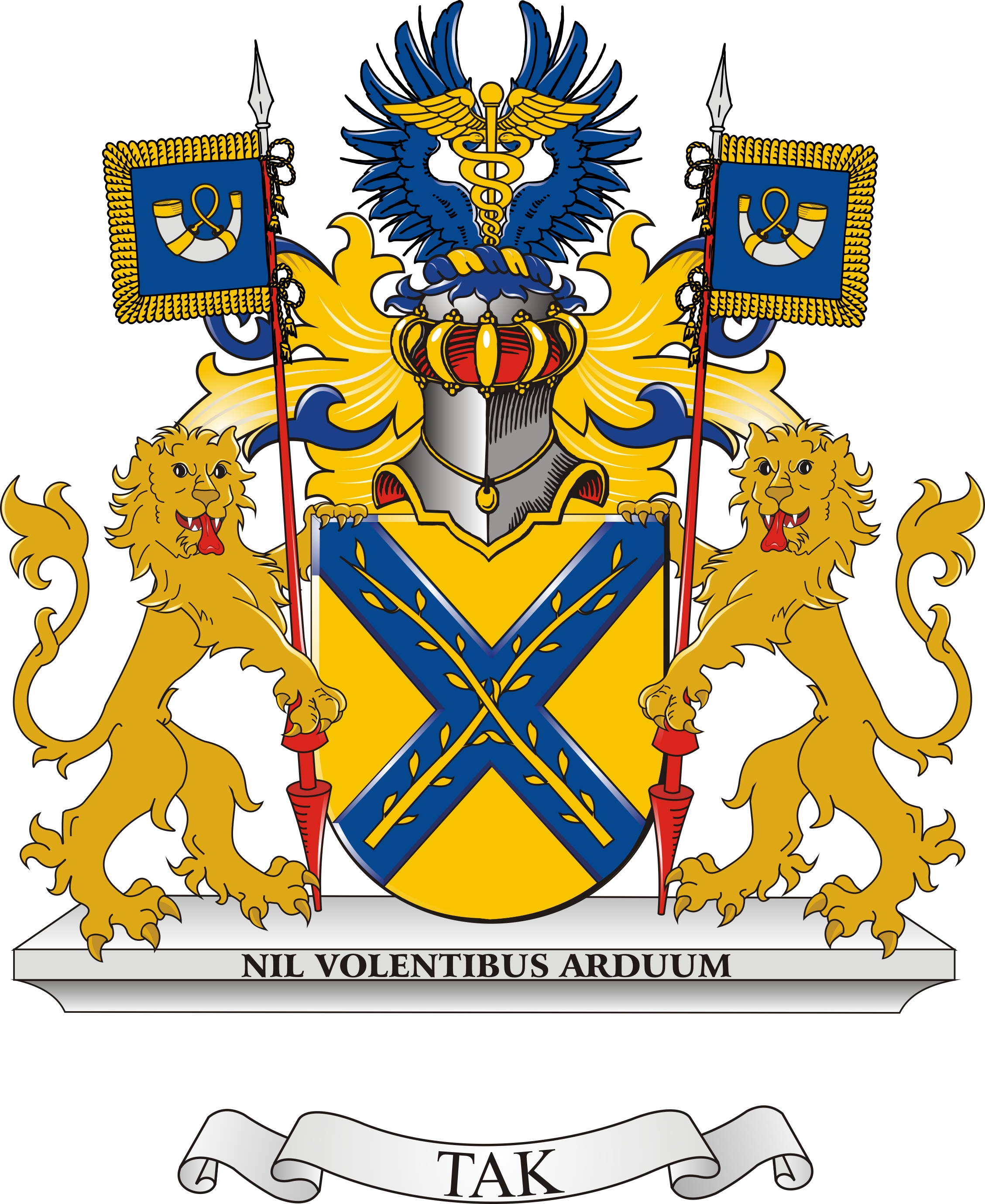
Coat of arms of the Dutch Tak family

=== Introduction ===
The Nil volentibus arduum literary society attempted to dictate the terms of the Dutch literary world and to exert intellectual influence by imposing the poetic rules of Aristotle, Horace, and Nicolas Boileau-Despréaux.

This society of francophiles ardently defended French letters in the United Provinces, and as Jan Fransen:

In their critiques the members of “Nil (volentibus arduum)” reproached their adversaries with not understanding even the French they translate. French tragedy and theatre came closest to their ideal; they introduced it with or without force onto the Dutch scene. With this goal, they translated and adapted classic works by Pierre Corneille, Jean Racine and Molière and corrected these great poets without flinching.

=== Historic and literary context ===
In 1669, in Amsterdam, a literary discussion on the subject of theatre led to the creation of a new artistic society, named Nil volentibus arduum. Until then, the Amsterdam scene had been in the grip of glassmaker (vitrier) and writer Jan Vos (1610/1611-1667), who among other points expressed with the adage Het zien gaat voor het zeggen (« La vision précède la parole », (seeing precedes speaking)) the idea that visual elements were more expressive than words. Vos was able to give himself over completely to his predilection for the visual thanks to his contacts in the Amsterdam government, who commissioned the stained-glass windows of the new Paleis op de Dam in 1655, as well as the large open-air living sculptures organized to greet important visitors. He also conceived ballets and theatrical productions, both his own and by other authors. His own works abounded in dramatical scenes. As regent of the Théâtre de Van Campen, Vos exercised considerable influence over its programming. To make special effects, like rapid changes of scenery and flying movements, possible—since the public adored such spectacles—he renovated the theatre in 1664–1665. But the popularity of Vos' work also rested on scenes of horror with elements like assassinations, hangings, dismemberment and other dark cruelties. Emotion and violence habitually constituted ingredients in his pieces: not because they rejoiced in such spectacles, but because his objective was to show the dangers of intemperance.

Member of the society were Andries Pels (1631-1681), Pieter Cornelis Verhoek, Gérard de Lairesse, Lodewijk Meyer and Johannes Bouwmeester.
