= Jan van Neck =

Dutch Golden Age painter

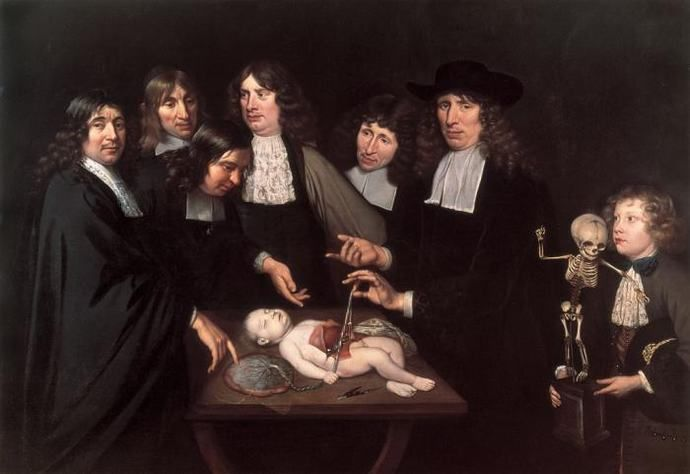
- Anatomical lesson by Dr. Frederik Ruysch.
- Born: Jan van Neck; 1634; Naarden
- Died: June 6, 1714 (aged 79); Amsterdam
- Known for: Painting
- Movement: Baroque

Jan van Neck (1634–1714), was a Dutch Golden Age painter.

== Biography ==
He was born in Naarden and became a painter, draftsman, engraver, and interior decorator. According to Houbraken his father was a doctor who apprenticed him to Jacob Adriaensz Backer to learn draftsmanship. He painted historical allegories, portraits, and scenes of naked women bathing. Houbraken liked especially an altarpiece in the Wallonian Catholic church of Amsterdam by his hand. Houbraken wrote that he was a friendly man with many entertaining stories, and he consulted him as a source for his books while he was bedridden. He mentions also that Neck was a great friend of Dirck Ferreris, whose collection of drawings and papierkunst or paper-art (probably paper-cuts) came into his possession on his death.
