= Jan Hoogsaat =

Dutch Golden Age painter

Jan Hoogsaat (March 12, 1654 – November 29, 1730) was a Dutch Golden Age painter.

Hoogsaat was born and died in Amsterdam. According to Houbraken, he was one of the best pupils of Gerard de Lairesse. He painted in Het Loo palace and he painted the ceiling of the citizen's hall ("burgerzaal") of the city hall (today the Royal Palace of Amsterdam).

According to the RKD his interior decorations survive in some buildings of Amsterdam.
