= Johann Georg Stuhr =

German Baroque painter

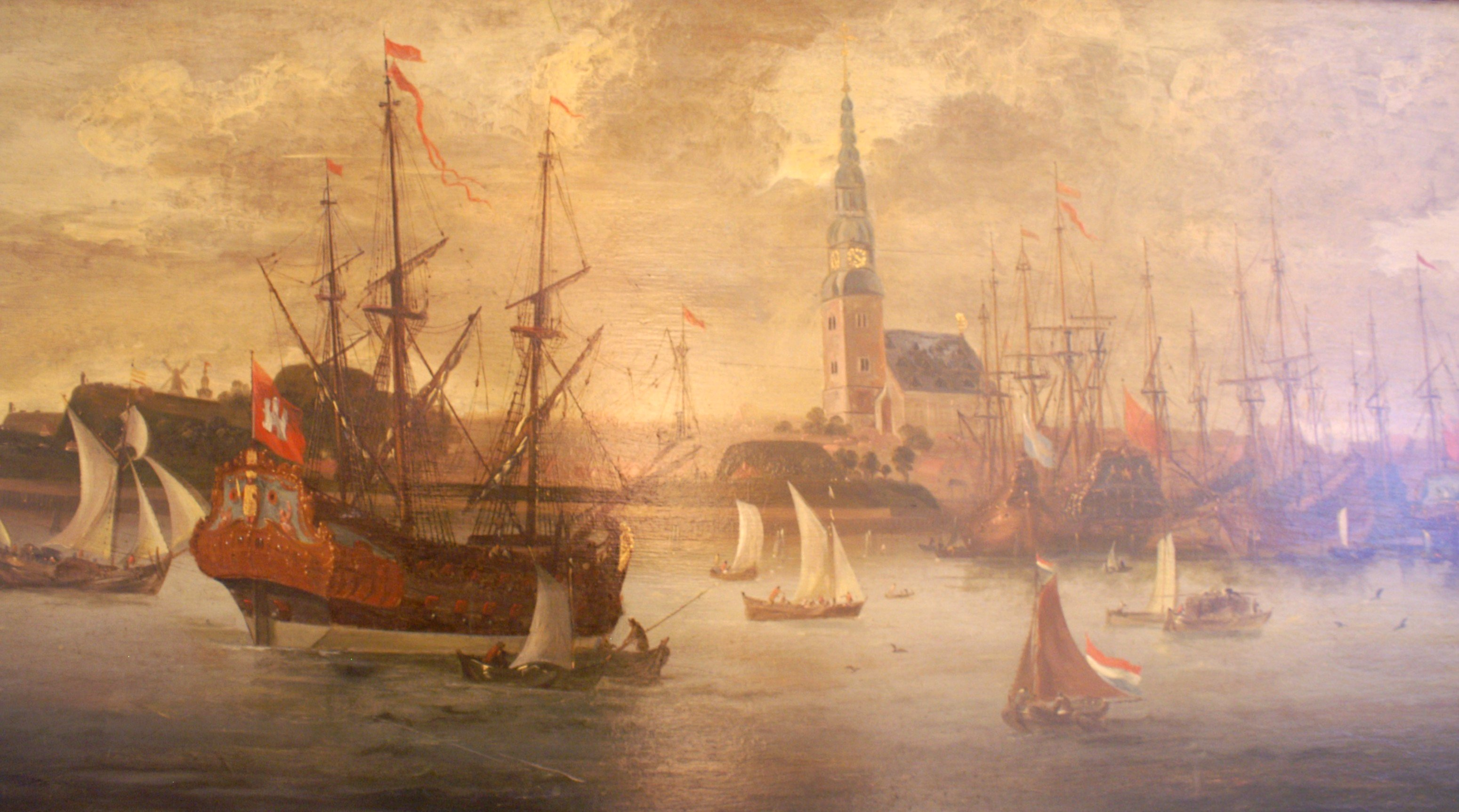
View of Hamburg from the Southwest

Johann Georg Stuhr (1640–1721) was a German Baroque painter. He was born and died in Hamburg.

== Biography ==
According to Houbraken he was the teacher of the Lubienetski brothers in Hamburg before they travelled to Amsterdam.

According to the RKD, he was the teacher of Christoffel and Theodor Lubienitzki. Known for battles, landscapes and marines.
