= Philip Tideman =

Dutch Golden Age painter

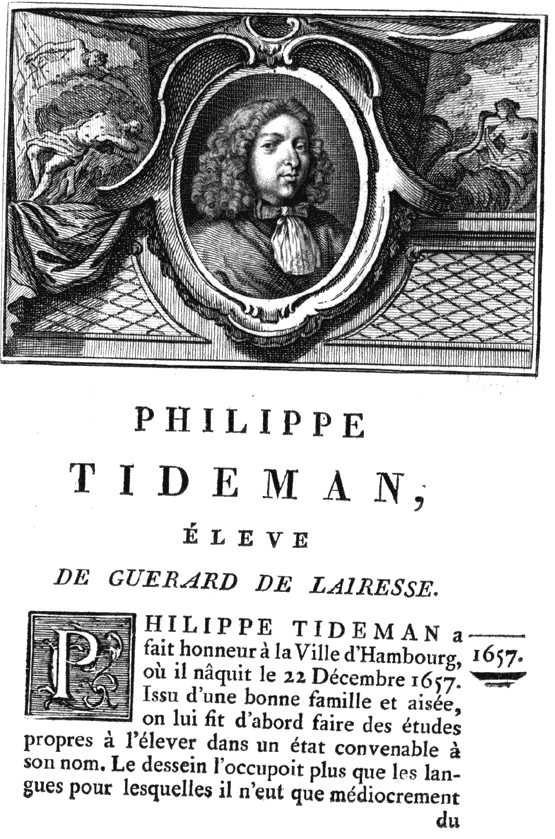
Philip Tideman's portrait and biography by Jean-Baptiste Descamps.

Philip Tideman (1657–1705) was a Dutch Golden Age painter.

== Biography ==
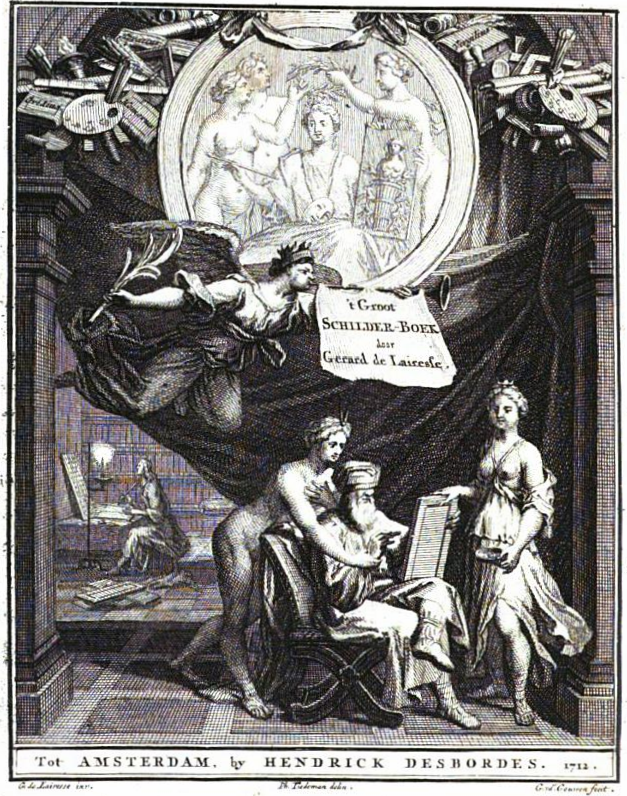
Titlepage engraved by Tideman after a design by De Lairesse, of "Het groot schilderboeck" ("Great Book of Painting"), by Gerard de Lairesse, published in 1710

Tideman was born in Hamburg. According to Houbraken he learned to paint in Hamburg from Ns Raes, and then became a self-supporting artist with pupils for a year, before deciding to try his fortunes in the art community in Amsterdam. There he became associated with Gerard de Lairesse, and lived with him and collaborated with him on large projects for two years. Houbraken included a list of homes of important men whose rooms were decorated with historical allegories by Tideman. In particular, he describes the summer home of Christiaan van Hoek on the Vecht, that he painted one winter with another painter named Smit, who, when the river froze, put on some skates and dragged Tideman behind him over the ice to Amsterdam. Upon arrival, the cloak that he had used as a sled was full of holes and therefore the "free" ride turned out more costly than he expected.

According to the RKD he married in Amsterdam in 1683, and is known for prints as well as room decorations. He was buried in the Nieuwezijds Kapel.
