= Krzysztof Lubieniecki =

Polish Baroque painter and engraver

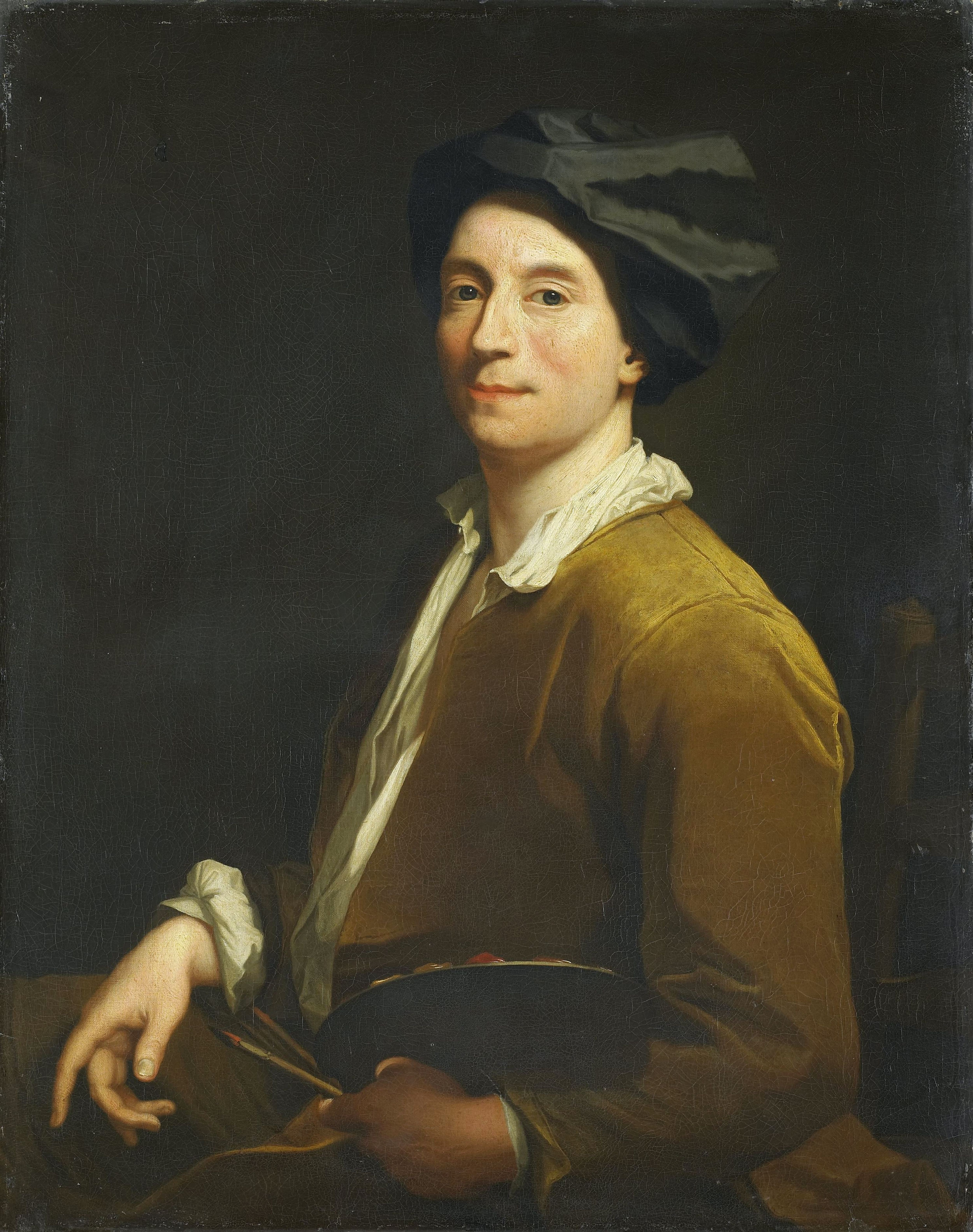
- Self portrait
- Born: 1659; Szczecin
- Died: 1729 (aged 69–70); Amsterdam
- Known for: Painting, Engraving
- Movement: Baroque

Krzysztof Lubieniecki or Christoffel Lubienietzky (1659–1729) was a Polish Baroque painter and engraver active in Amsterdam during the Dutch Golden Age.

== Biography ==
Krzysztof Lubieniecki was born in Stettin (today: Szczecin), Pomerania then part of Swedish Pomerania in the Holy Roman Empire. His brother Teodor Lubieniecki was also a painter and engraver. They learned to paint from the landscape and seascape painter Juriaan Stur in Hamburg. In 1667 they travelled to Amsterdam, where Krzysztof apprenticed with Adriaen Backer, and Teodor with Gerard de Lairesse. In 1682, Teodor moved to Hannover before eventually moving to Poland in 1706, where he died.

Krzysztof remained in Amsterdam, where he painted portraits and genre pieces. He also collaborated on prints for Jacobus Houbraken, Daniël Willink, and Johannes Brandt (son of Gerard Brandt). He died in Amsterdam.

In 1944 a Lubieniecki painting Portrait of a young man was looted from the National Museum of Warsaw by the Nazis during the Warsaw Uprising. It was in turn seized by an American serviceman and not returned to Polish authorities before 2015.

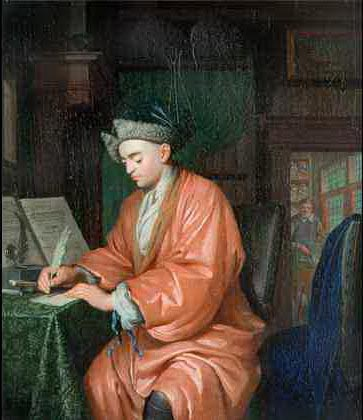
Medicine doctor in his studio with assistant preparing medicine.

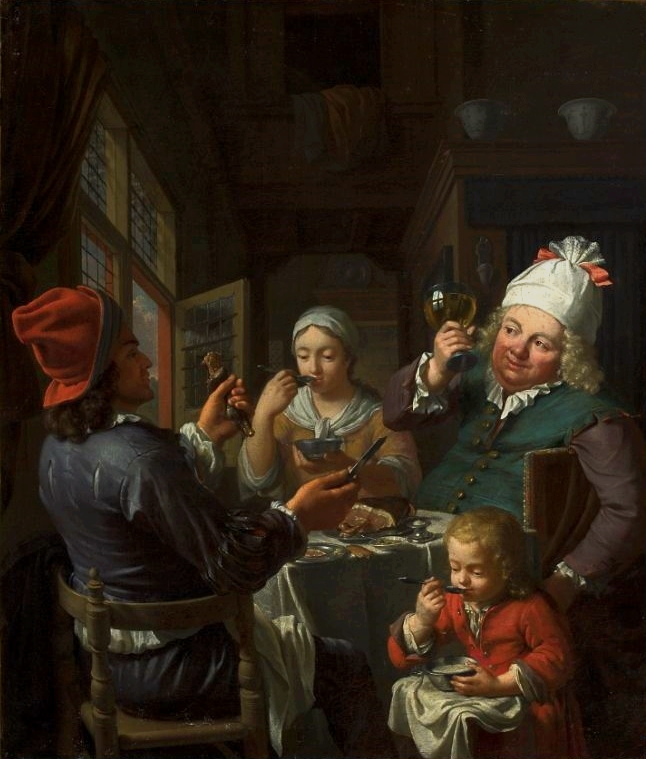
Gourmands.

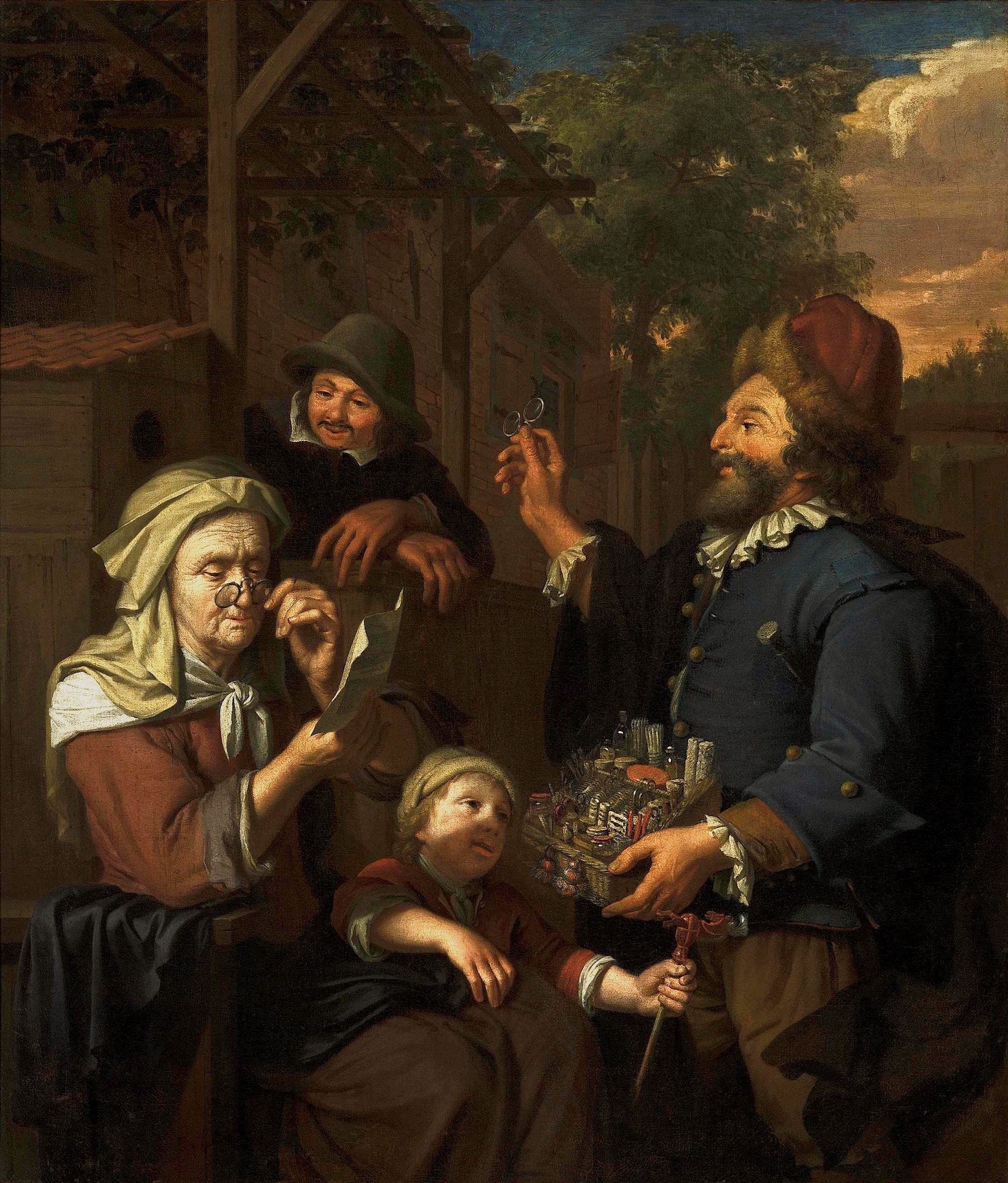
Seller of spectacles.

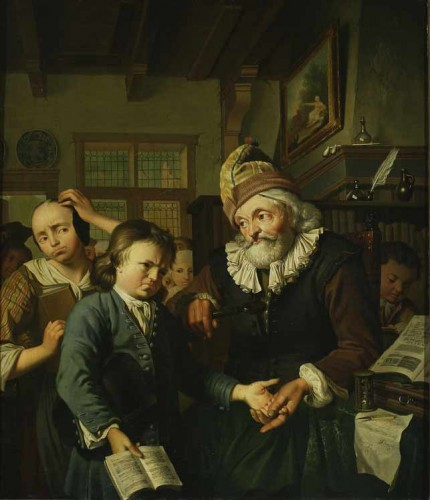
School-teacher,

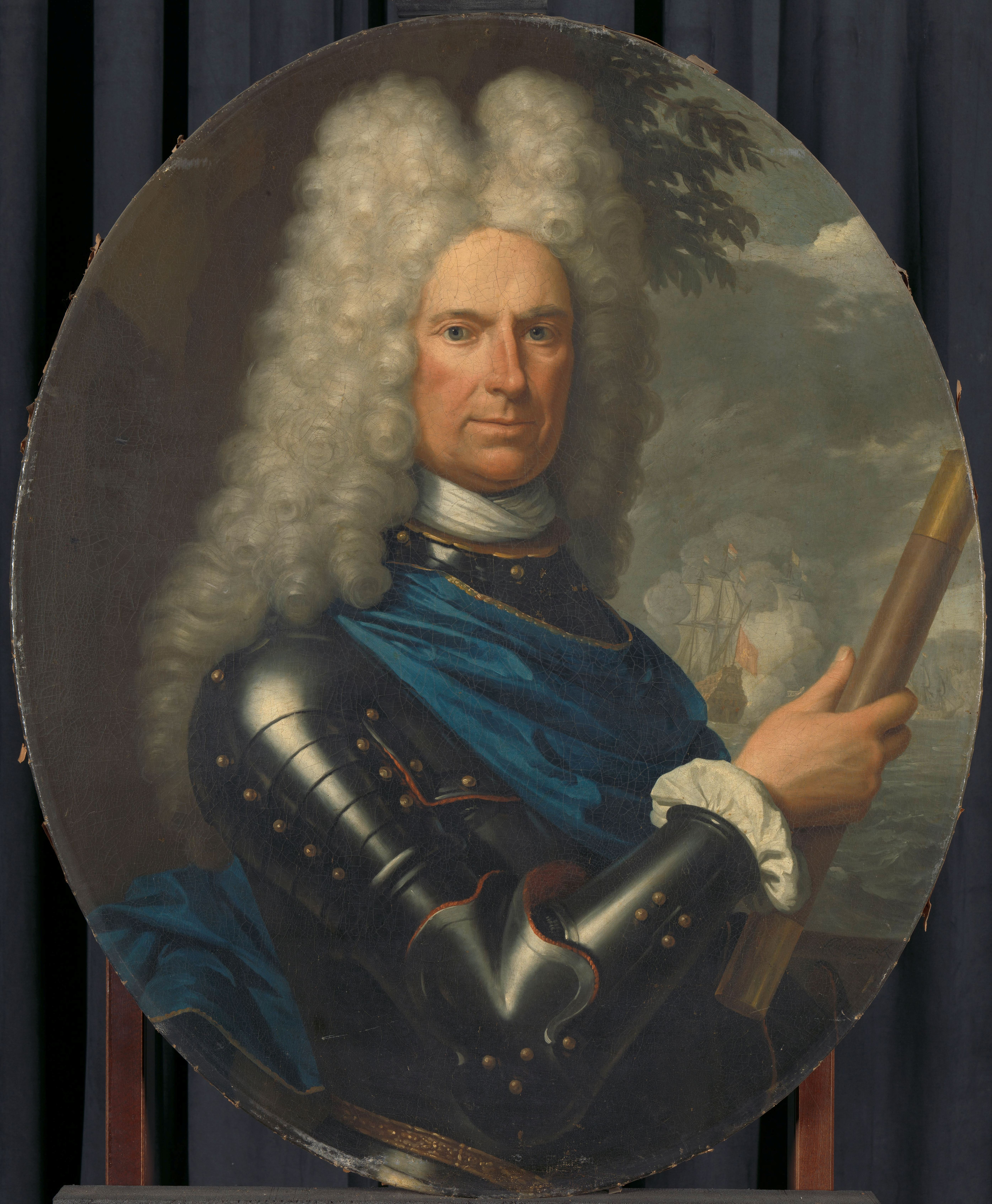
Arent van Buren

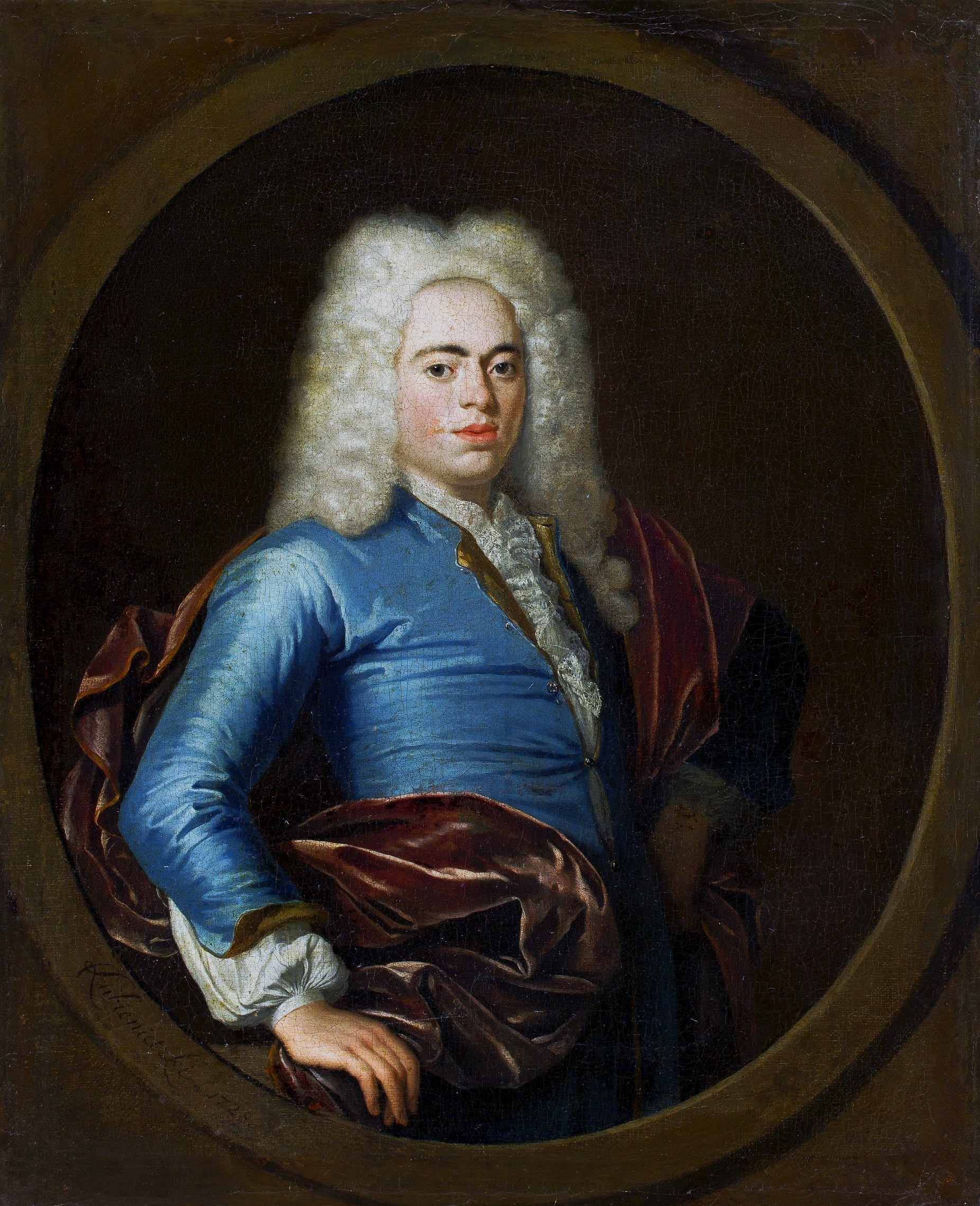
Portrait of a young man. Looted from the National Museum of Warsaw by the Nazis during the Warsaw Uprising.
