= Marcus de Bye =

Dutch painter

- Born: 1638; The Hague
- Died: 1688; Grave, Netherlands
- Known for: Print artist, painter, draftsman, publisher

Marcus de Bye sometimes spelt de Bie or de Bije (1638/39, The Hague - after 1688) was a Dutch painter and engraver.

== Life ==
He learnt to paint under Jacob van der Does, and produced some landscapes with animals in the style his teacher, but he is best known for his etchings of animals, after the designs of Paulus Potter and Markus Gerard. Member of Confrerie Pictura. He died in 1670.

== Works ==
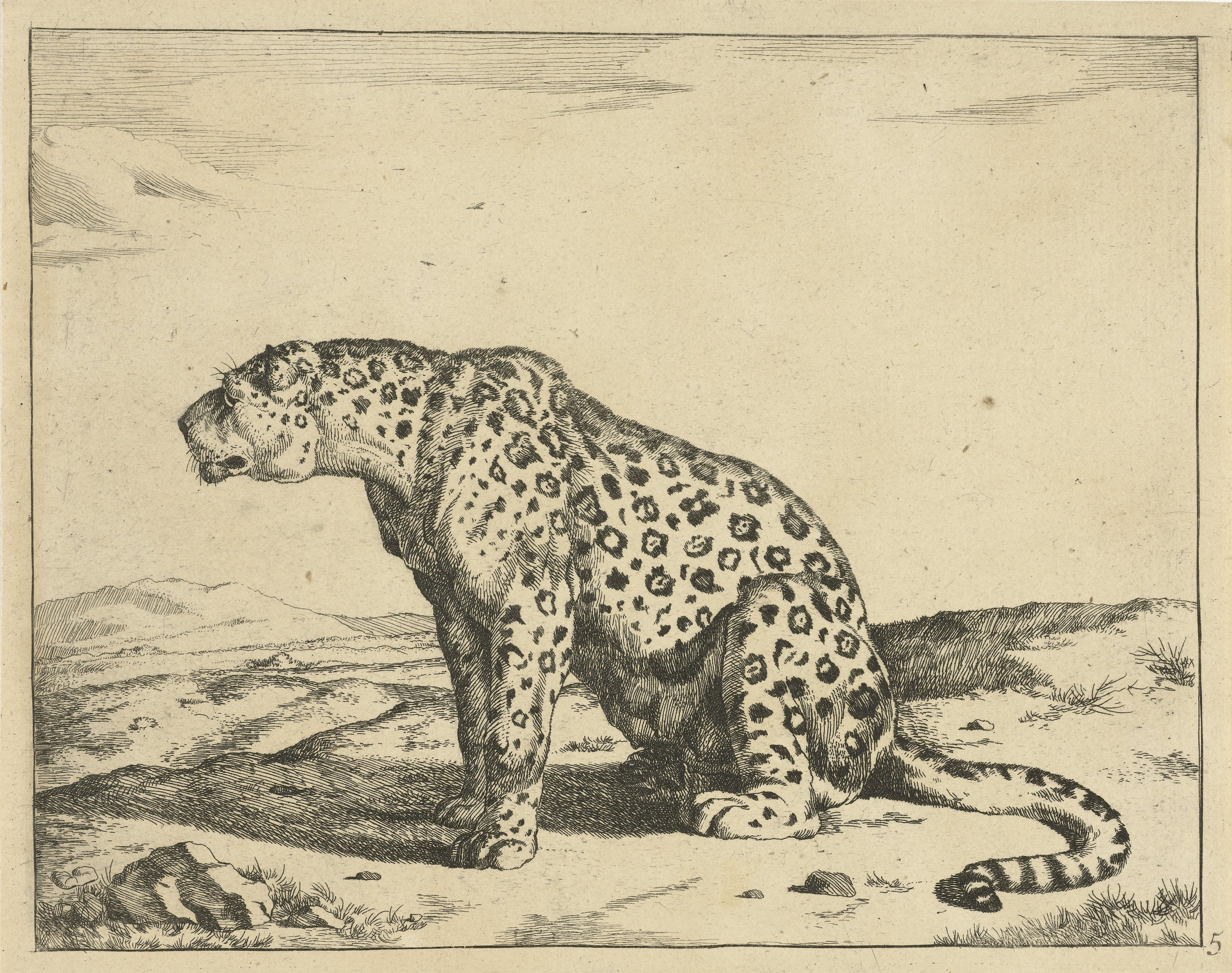
Etching by Marcus de Bye, after Paulus Potter

His works include

- The fat Spitzhund.
- The Mule-driver.
- Three sets, of eight each, of Cows and Oxen, after Potter.
- A set of sixteen of Sheep, after Potter.
- A set of sixteen of Goats, after Potter.
- A set of sixteen of Lions, Leopards, Wolves, Bears, etc., after Potter.
- A set of sixteen of the Natural History of the Bear; after Markus Gerard. 1664.
