= Claes Corneliszoon Moeyaert =

Catholic Dutch painter

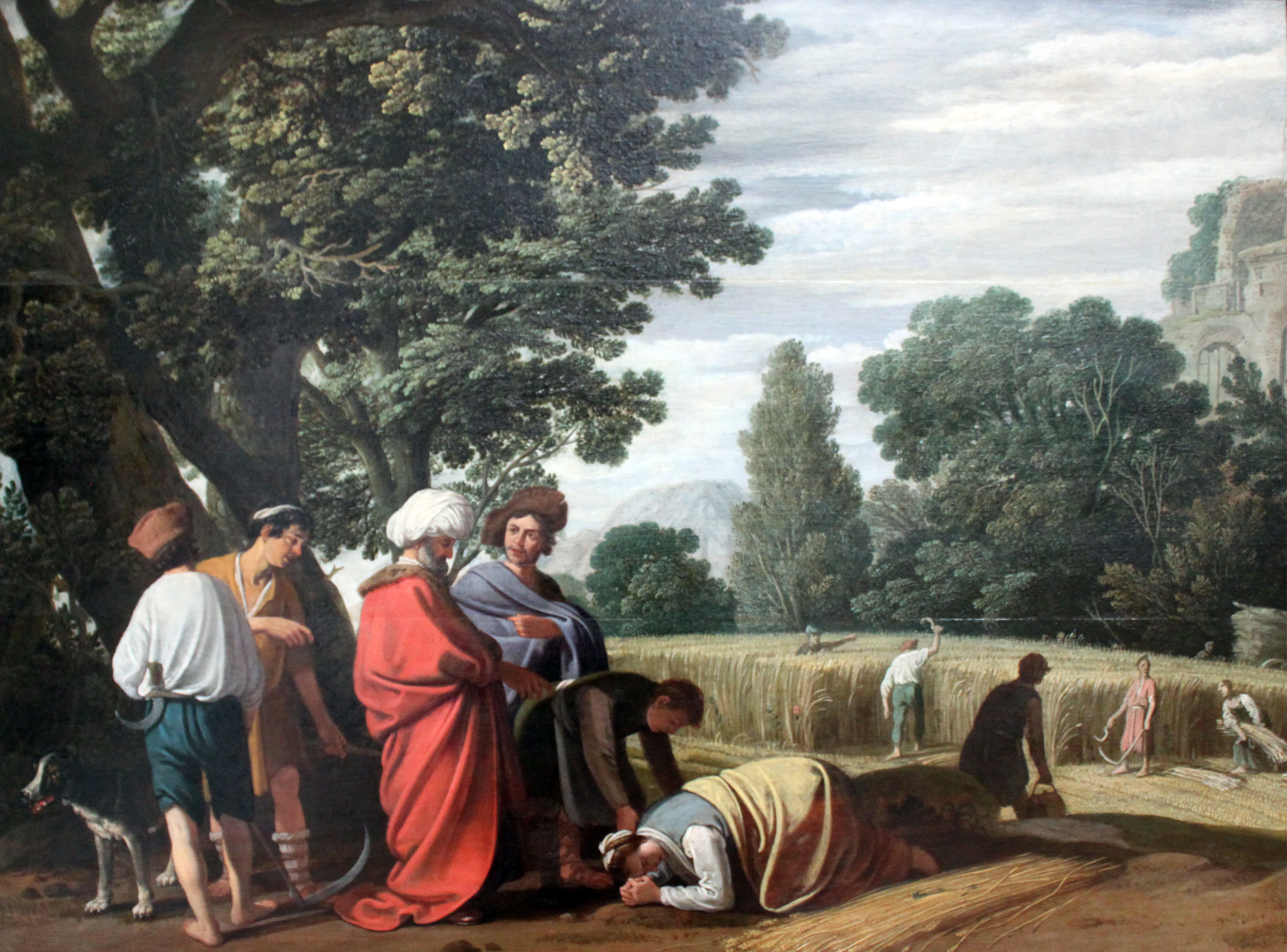
Ruth and Boaz, 1628

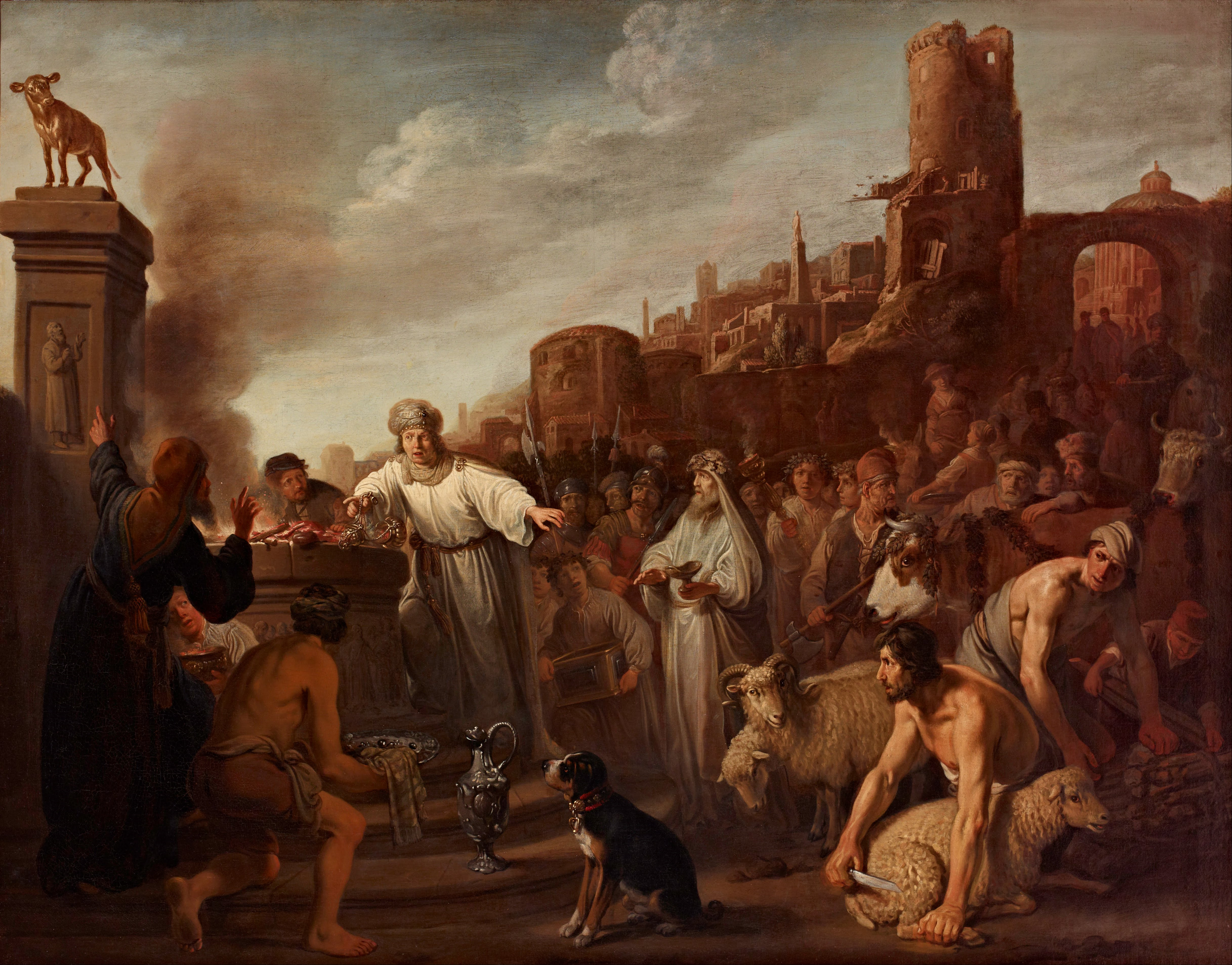
Jeroboam Sacrificing to his Idols, 1641

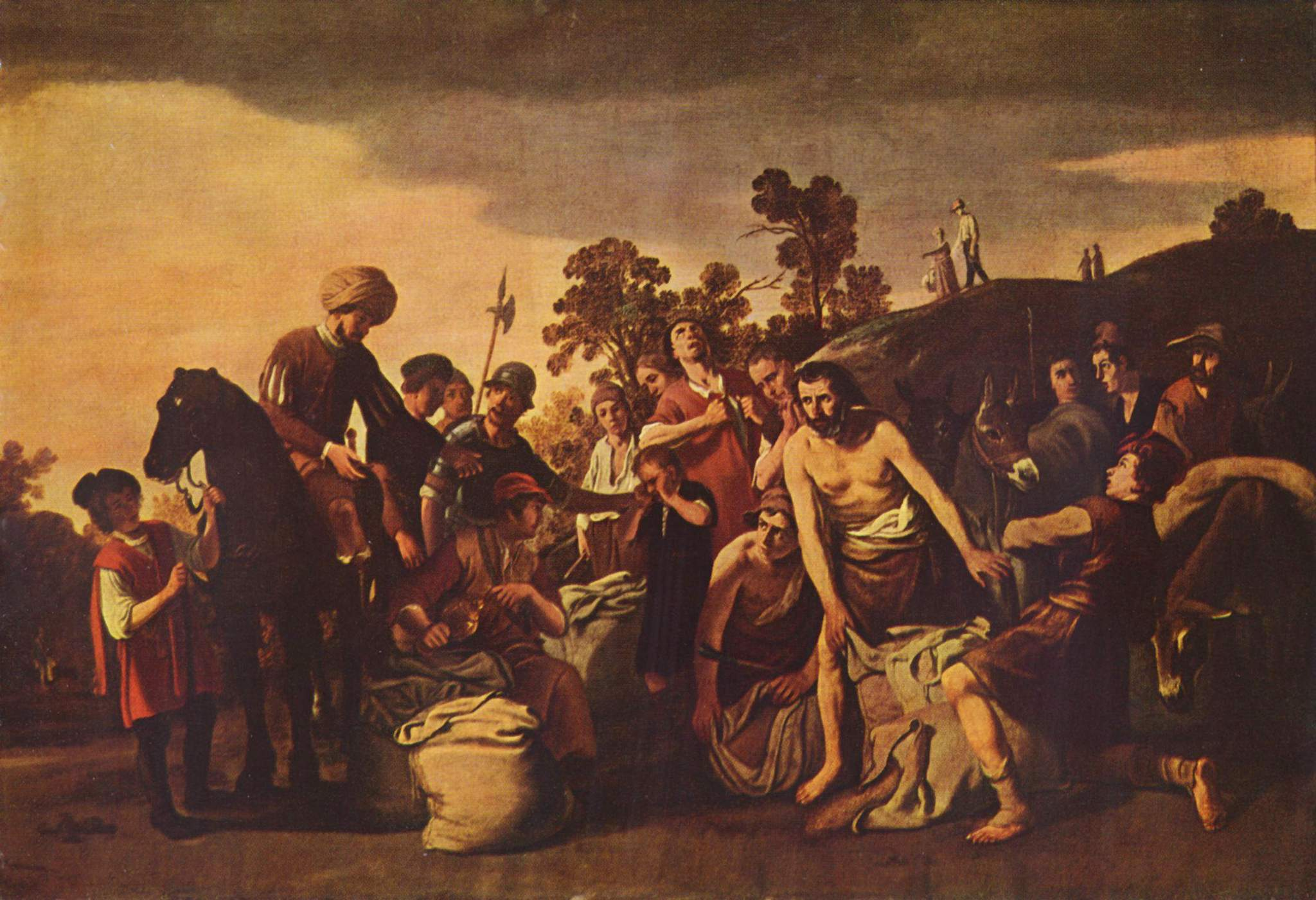
Claes Moeyaert (1627), "Joseph finds the silver in Benjamin's sacks"

Claes Corneliszoon Moeyaert or Nicolaes Moyaert or Mooyaert (1592–1655) was an authoritative Catholic Dutch painter. He followed Rembrandt in his use of red chalk.

Moeyart was born in Durgerdam. As a young man he is thought to have traveled to Italy to see and experience its art. At 25 he married Grietje Claes (in 1617). Possibly he was in business with Pieter Lastman in St. Antoniesbreestraat.

Moeyaert painted many biblical and mythological scenes, and also designed Amsterdam's triumphal arch for the arrival of Maria de Medici. On 1 September 1638, he stood on the Spaarndammerdijk to watch the procession.

Moeyaert was a very rich man and had three children, two mentally challenged and cared for in his own home. He had stakes in the business of Hendrick van Uylenburgh, a famous art dealer, related to Rembrandt's wife, Saskia van Uylenburgh.

Moeyaert was for many years' commissioner of the Theatre of Van Campen, with Jan Vos. He lived until his death at a house on the Singel, not far from Torensluis. Nicolaes Berchem, Salomon Koninck, Jacob van der Does and Jan Baptist Weenix were his pupils.

== Bibliography ==
- Tümpel, A. (1974) Claes Cornelisz Moeyaert. In: Oud Holland 88, p. 1-163, p. 245-290.
