= Dirck Ferreris =

Dutch Golden Age painter

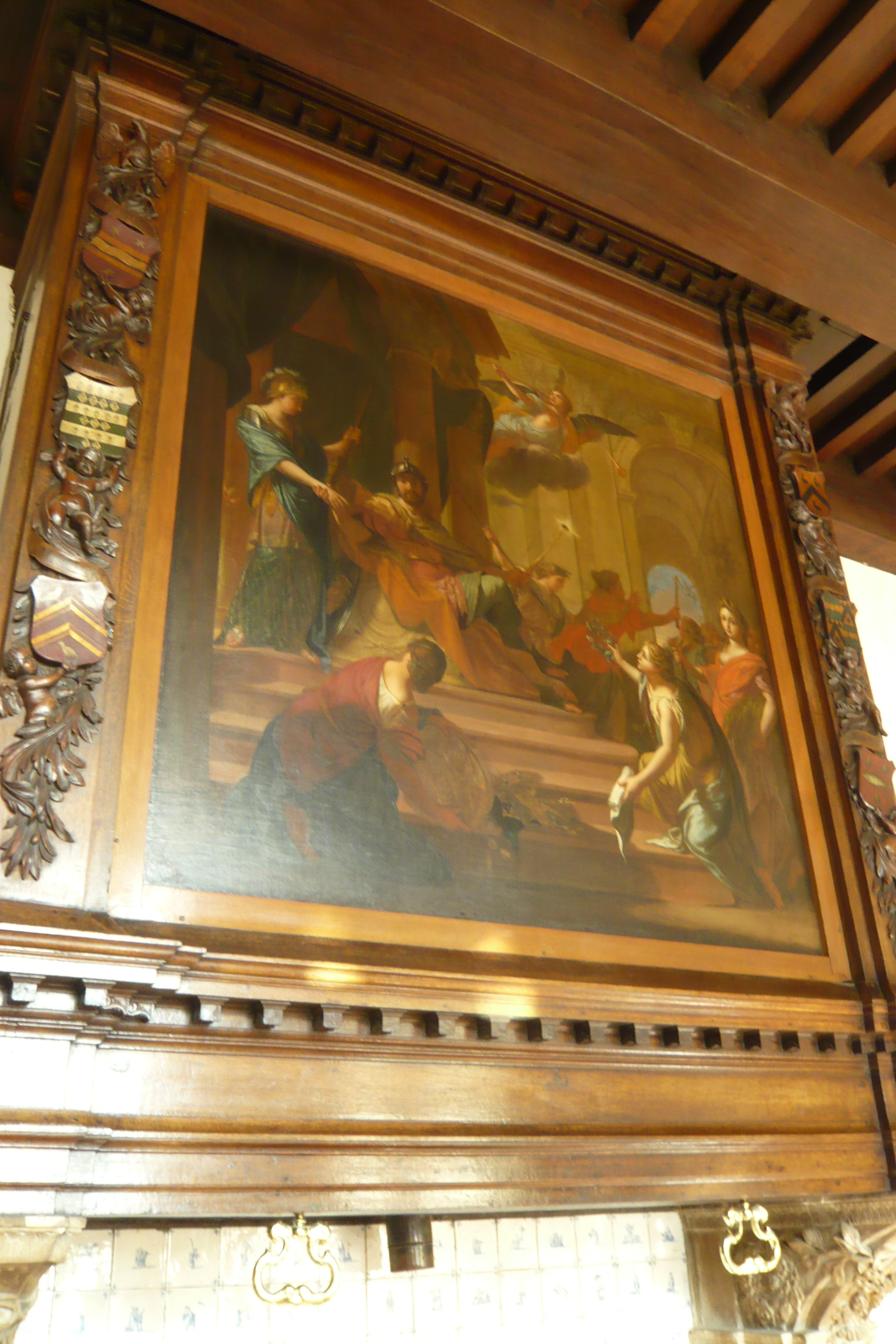
- Allegory of Good Government, in Haarlem City Hall.
- Born: Dirck Ferreris; 1639; Enkhuizen
- Died: June 6, 1693 (aged 59); Enkhuizen
- Known for: Painting
- Movement: Baroque

Dirck Ferreris, Diederik, or Theodor Freres (1639 – 6 June 1693), was a Dutch Golden Age painter.

== Biography ==
He spent most of his life in Enkhuizen and several works of his hang in the Enkhuizen city hall. He travelled to Italy in 1666 with Adriaen Backer and, after returning to Amsterdam, he went to London to spend some time working for Sir Peter Lely in 1678. According to Houbraken he specialised in decorating galleries and decorated one at Huis Honselaarsdijk and one in Amsterdam for a gentleman named Mr Roeters. After he returned from Italy he became friends with Johannes Voorhout, with whom he practised drawing in a small group from a naked model. He told Voorhout that he had been very keen on saving money and only spent 30 guilders in his whole year in Italy, and that was the reason he couldn't spend much time with the Bentvueghels. This puzzled Houbraken, who wrote that he came from a good family and didn't need to save. In his biographical sketch of Johan van Neck, Houbraken mentions that he was a great friend of Freres and left him his papierkunst or paper-art.
