= Adriaen Backer =

Dutch Golden Age portrait painter

- Born: Adriaen Backer; 1635/36; Amsterdam
- Died: 1684; Amsterdam
- Known for: Painting
- Movement: Baroque

Adriaen Backer (ca 1635, Amsterdam — buried 23 May 1684, Amsterdam) was a Dutch Golden Age portrait painter, active in Amsterdam and Haarlem.

== Biography ==
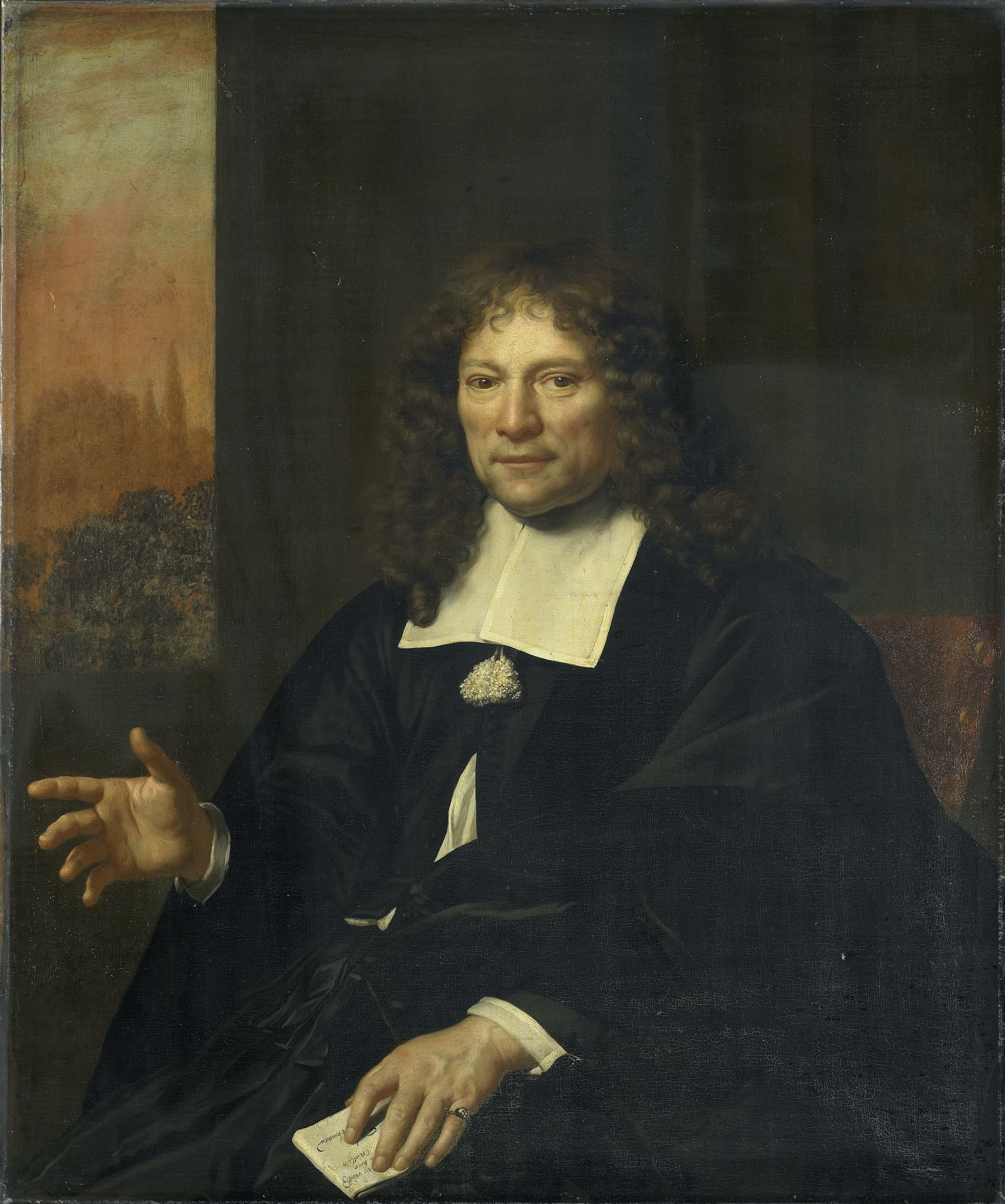
Portrait of Daniel Niellius, 1671

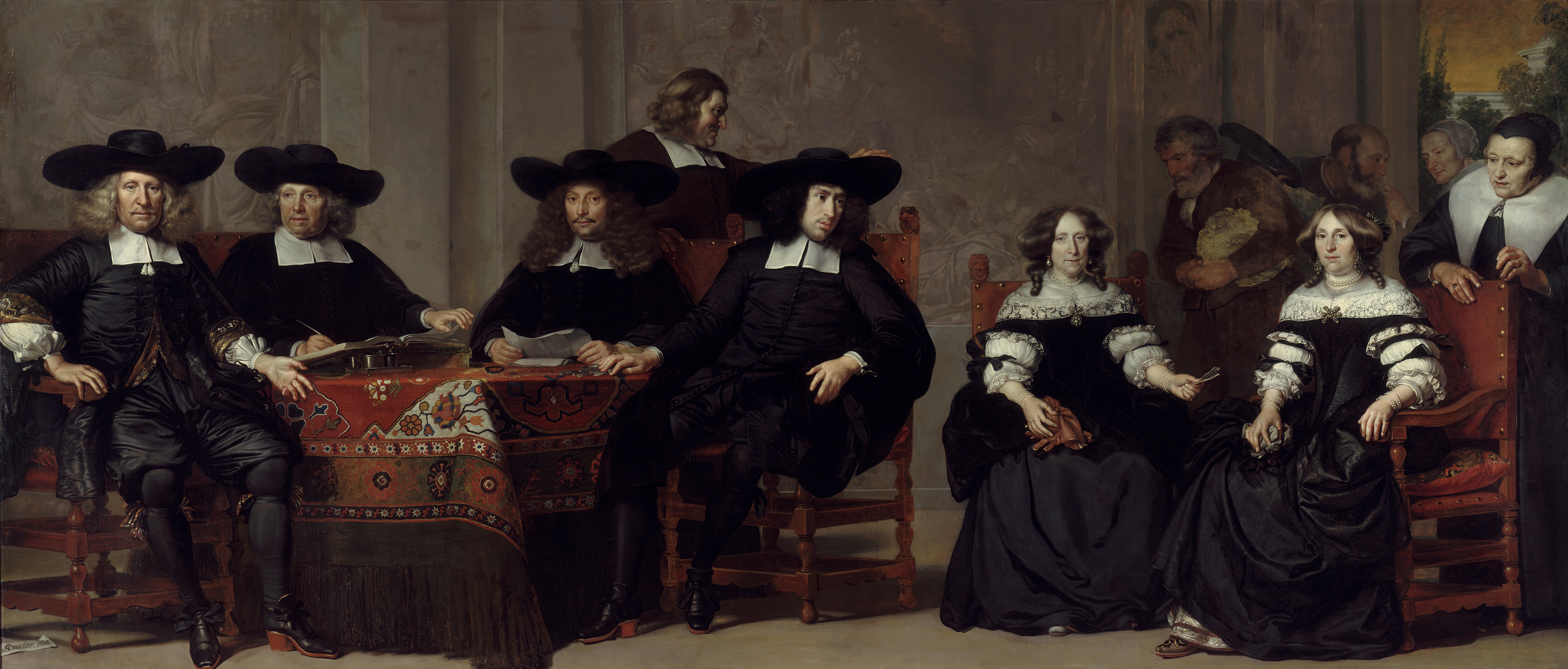
Amsterdam almshouse regents, 1676

Backer was the son of the Mennonite Tjerk Adriaensz and the Remonstrant Marritje Dootshooft. He was born in Amsterdam. His baptizing is not registered, letting S.A.C. Dudok van Heel suggest that he was born before 1633., though Adriaen professed to be 33 at his wedding in 1669. Adriaen probably learned to paint from his uncle Jacob Adriaensz Backer. In 1666 he traveled to Italy with Dirck Ferreris. In December 1667 he was back in Amsterdam and a witness when his brother Jacob married.

Backer married Elsje Colyn on August 27, 1669 and the couple had two sons, who both died very young. Backer lived on Spui, behind Begijnhof, Amsterdam. Christoffel Lubienitski was his pupil and learned to paint portraits from him.

Backer produced several group portraits of Hofje regents as well as historical allegories for city commissions. According to Houbraken his Last Judgement hanging in the court room (vierschaar) of the Amsterdam City Hall (now called the Amsterdam Royal Palace) was one of his best works.
