= Simon van der Does =

Dutch painter

Simon van der Does (1653 – after 1717) was a Dutch Golden Age landscape painter.

== Biography ==
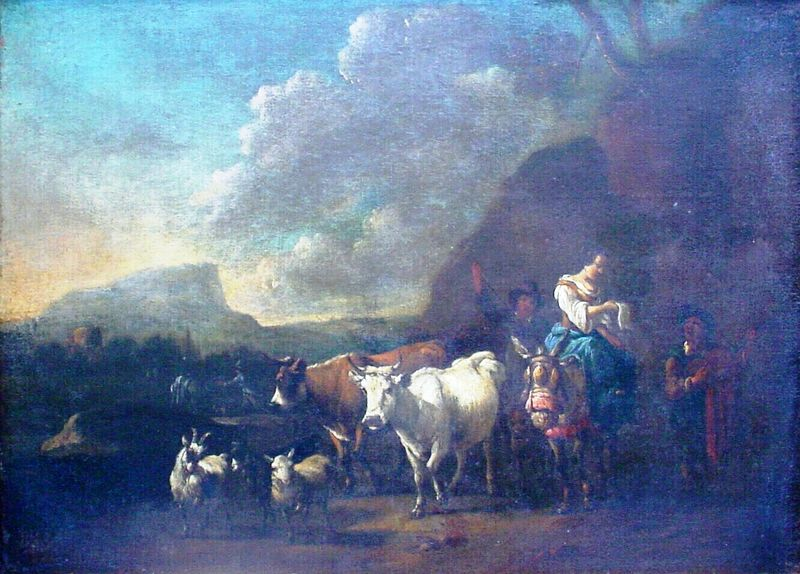
Simon van der Does (1653 – after 1717)

Van der Does was born in The Hague, the son of Jacob van der Does by his second wife. He was taught to paint by his father and became in turn the teacher of the later art historian Johan van Gool. He painted Italianate landscapes in the manner of his father. According to Houbraken, who got his information from Johan van Gool first hand, Simon van der Does spent time in Friesland and one year in England in his youth, and could paint portraits in the style of Caspar Netscher. He married but was barely able to make ends meet, and after both his wife and father died he was so depressed that he could not paint and stayed in the Gasthuis of The Hague for three years, and afterwards moved to Brussels for a year and then moved to Antwerp, working for the cutthroats (keelbeulen, or Houbraken's name for art dealers).

A friend of his father, Karel Dujardin, became his guardian, and after his return from Italy set up a workshop in Amsterdam where he took on the sons of Jacob van der Does (Houbraken only mentions Simon and his half-brother Jacob II van der Does). After the death of Dujardin, he worked for Gerard de Lairesse in Amsterdam until he could support himself. He was on his way to visit Paris when he died at Antwerp.
