= Jacob van der Does =

Dutch Golden Age landscape painter

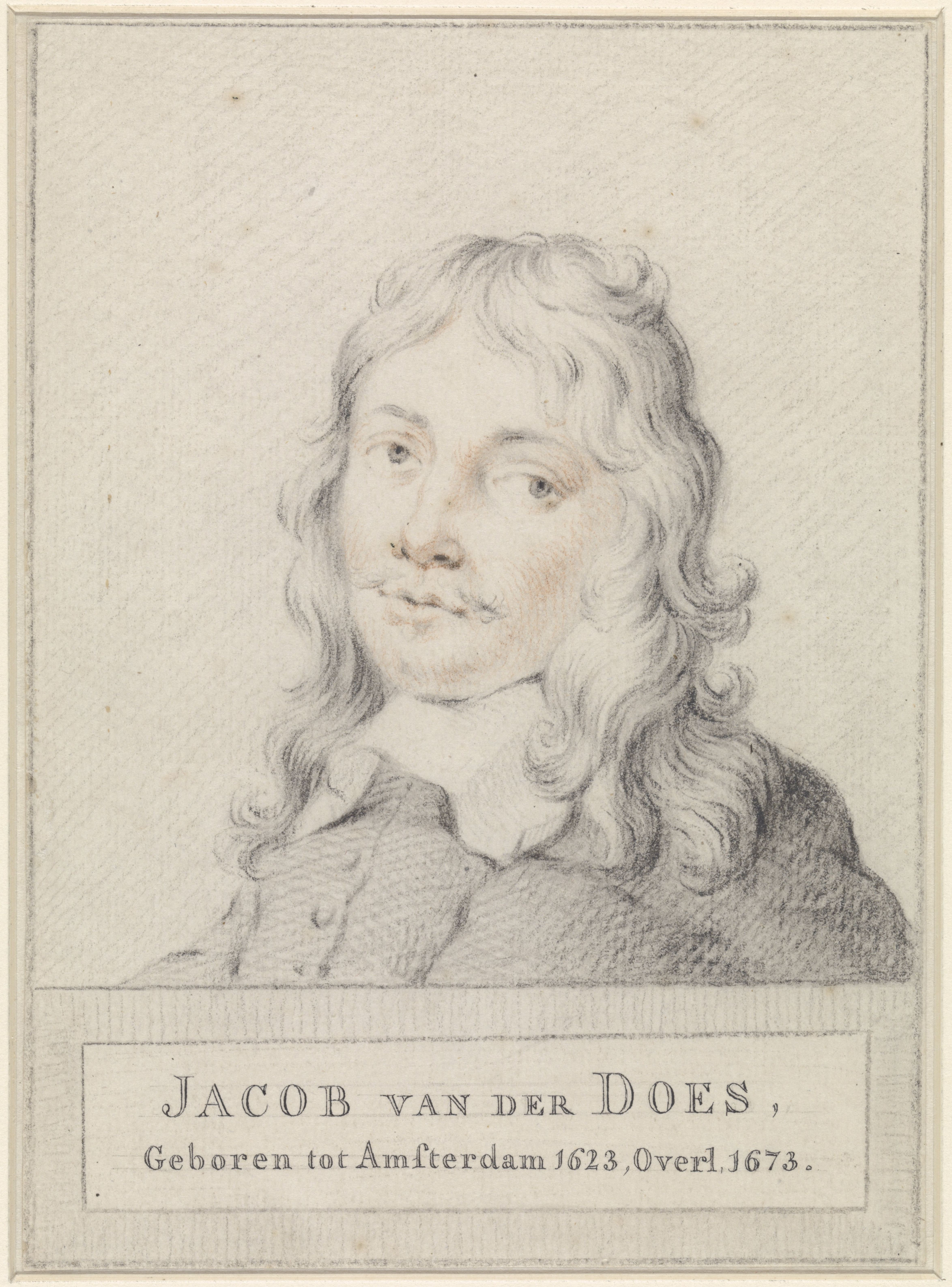
Portrait of Jacob van der Does

Jacob van der Does (4 March 1623 in Amsterdam – buried 17 November 1673 in Sloten) was a Dutch Golden Age landscape painter.

== Biography ==
Van der Does was the son of the secretary of the Amsterdam city council. He was more attracted to the arts than to note-taking, and went to study drawing with Claes Corneliszoon Moeyaert. He left at 21 to go to France, and from there on foot to Italy. In Rome he joined the Bentvueghels and was dubbed Tamboer, which means drummerboy, since he was somewhat short and had been meant for the military life. He studied with Pieter van Laer (Bamboots). When he eventually returned North, he settled in The Hague where he married Margaretha Boortens and got 4 sons and a daughter. His wife died in 1661. Houbraken liked his natural style of painting, and especially his way of painting sheep was very admirable.

His wife's sister was Maria Boortens, and they both were good artists themselves. All three of them made drawings for the album of the wealthy Hague diplomat Cornelis de Glarges in 1659. Through Maria Boortens, Jacob van der Does was connected to Jacob van Campen and Adriaen van Nieulandt the younger. He became involved in the Guild of St. Luke in The Hague. He was one of the founders of the Confrerie Pictura in 1656. His pupils were Theodor Bernoille, Marcus de Bye, Gamaliel Day, Alexander Havelaer, Anthony Schinckels, and his sons Jacob II and Simon van der Does.

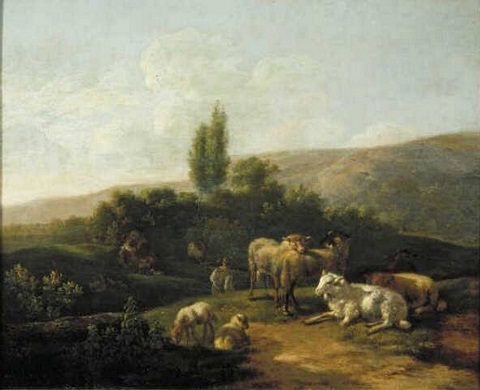
Italian Evening Landscape with Flock and Shepherd
(between 1660 and 1670)

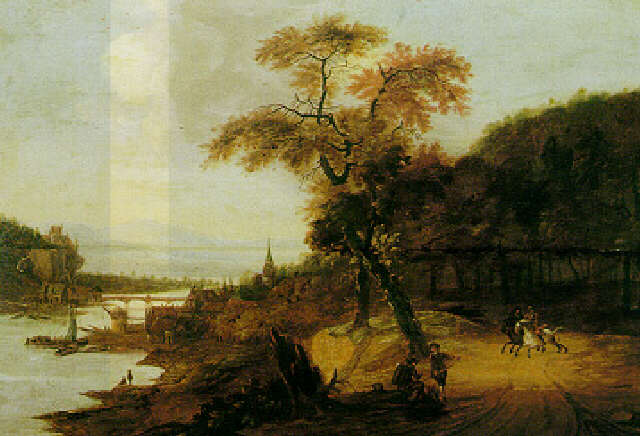
Landscape along a river with horsemen
(between 1669 and 1699)
