= The Lives of Dutch painters and paintresses =

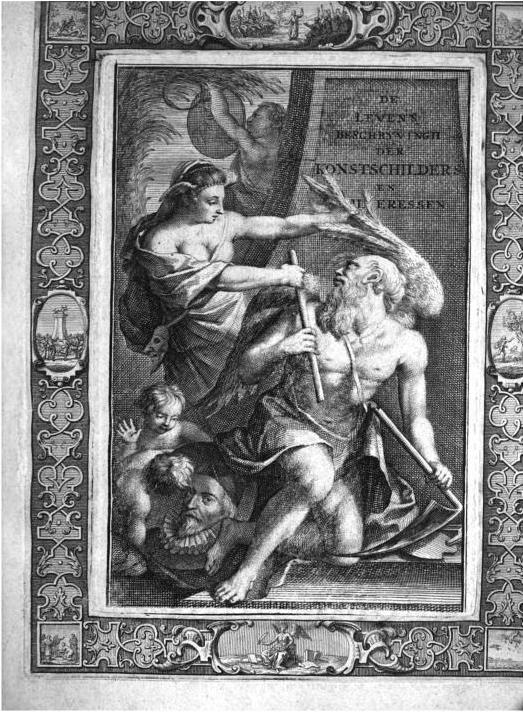
- Frontispiece of first volume with portrait of Otto van Veen
- Author: Jacob Campo Weyerman
- Original title: De levens-beschryvingen der Nederlandsche konst-schilders en konst-schilderessen
- Language: Dutch
- Subject: Artist biographies
- Publisher: Jacob Campo Weyerman
- Publication date: 1729–1769
- Publication place: Netherlands

The Lives of Dutch painters and paintresses, or De levens-beschryvingen der Nederlandsche konst-schilders en konst-schilderessen, as it was originally known in Dutch, is a series of artist biographies with engraved portraits written by the 18th-century painter Jacob Campo Weyerman. It was published in four volumes as a sequel to Arnold Houbraken's own list of biographies known as the Schouburgh. The first volume appeared in 1729, and the last volume was published in 1769. This work is considered to be a very important source of information on 17th-century artists of the Netherlands, specifically those artists who worked in The Hague and in London. Of the biographies, ten are about women and fourteen additional women artists are mentioned in biographies of others.

== Volume I ==
The engraved portraits included as illustrations in Volume I are below, followed by the artists listed in order of appearance in the text. The illustrations are all copied from Houbraken.

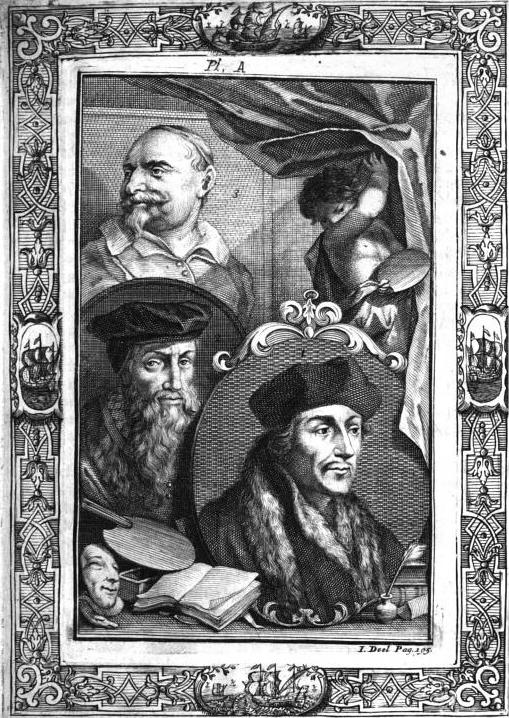
Johan Snellinx - David Jorisz - Erasmus

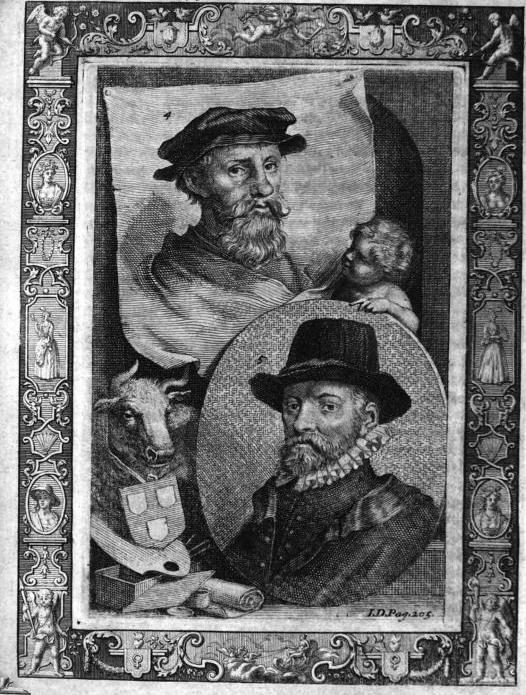
Dirck and Wouter Crabeth

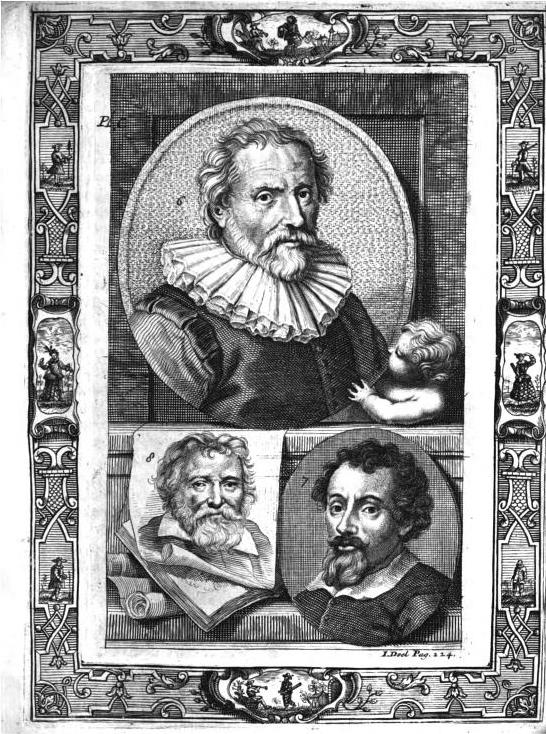
Abraham Bloemaert - Adam Elsheimer - Adam van Oor

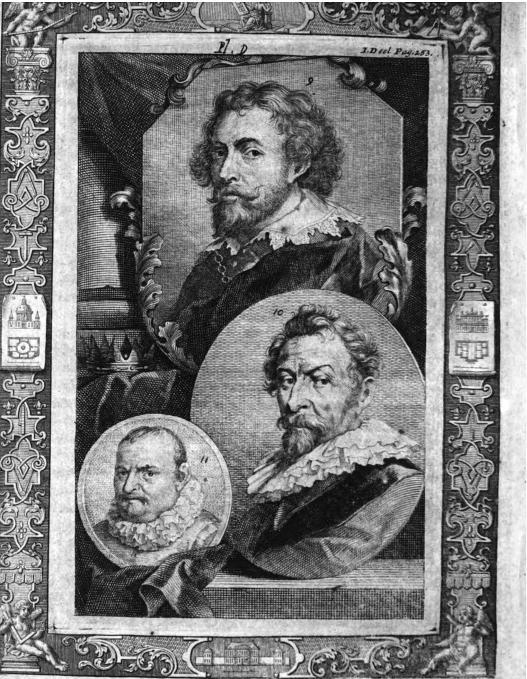
Rubens- Hendrik van Balen - Roelant Savery

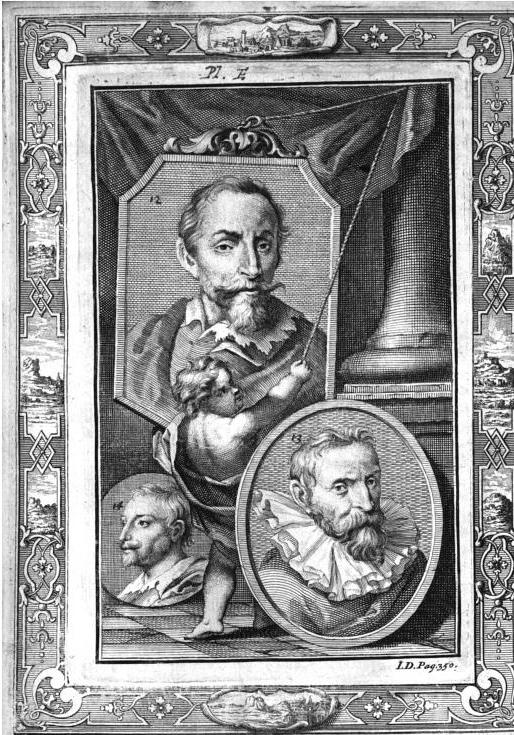
Frans Snijders- Jan Breughel - Cornelis Schut

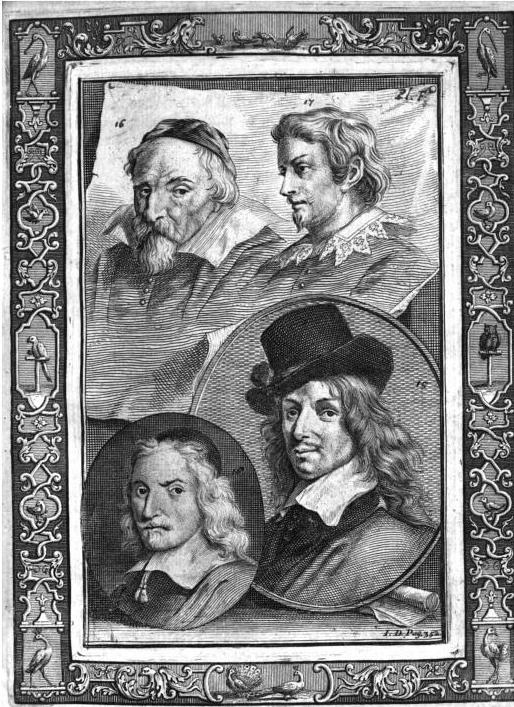
Frans Hals- Wencelas Coebergher - Lucas van Uden - Wybrand de Geest

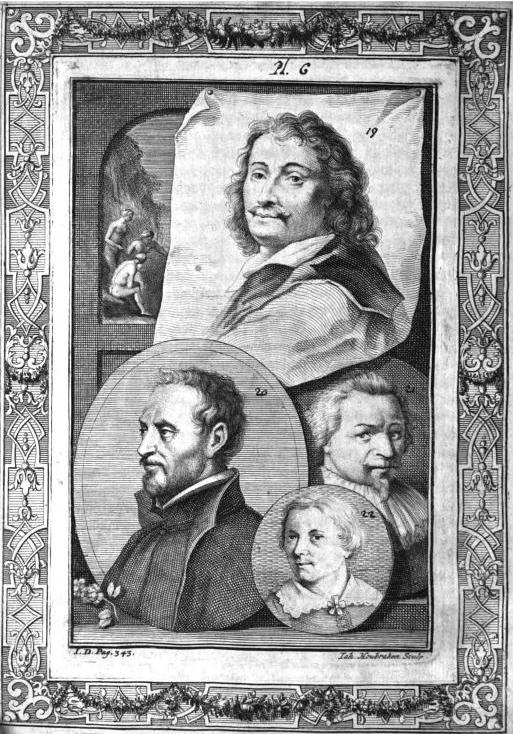
Cornelis Poelenburgh - Daniel Seghers - Johannes Torenttius - Pieter de Valck

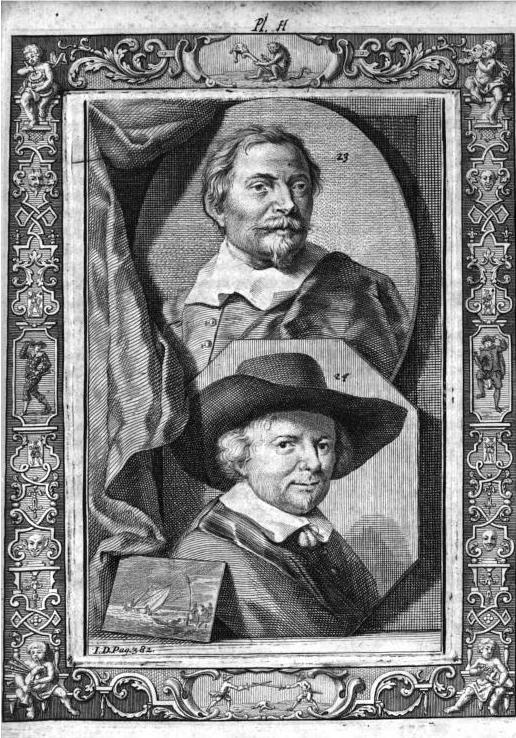
Jacob Jordaens - Jan van Goyen

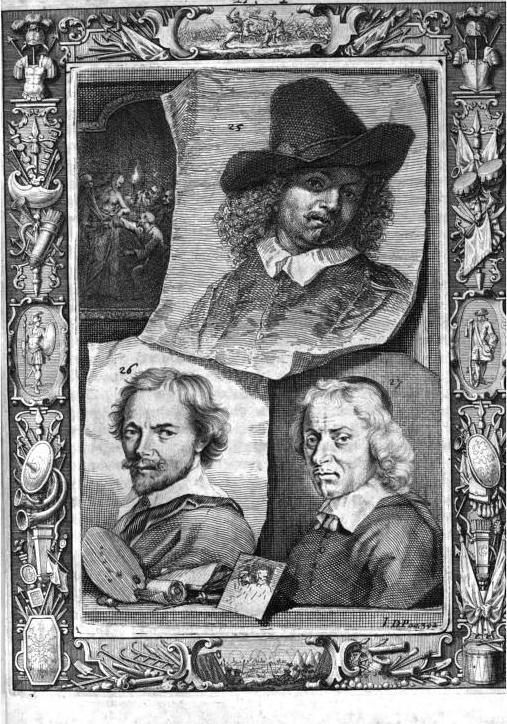
Leonard Bramer - Dirk van Hoogstraten - Salomon de Bray

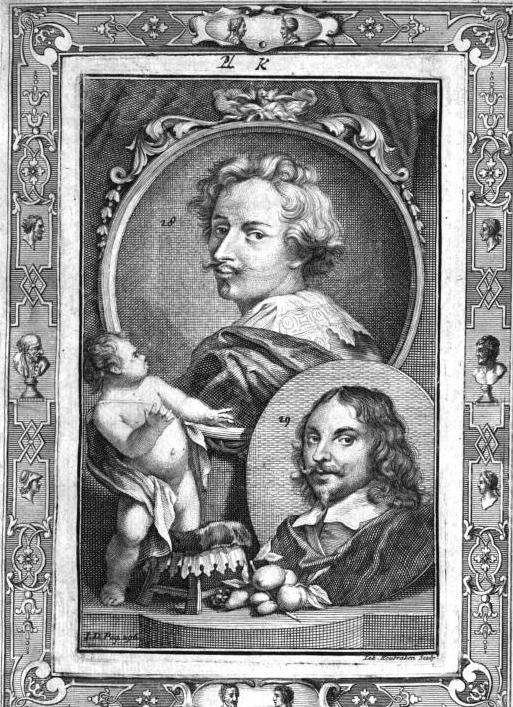
Anthony van Dijk and Jan Davidsz de Heem
- Hubert van Eyck, p 179
- Jan van Eyck, p 179
- Marguérite van Eyk, p 180
- Desiderius Erasmus, p 194
- David Joris, p 199
- Cornelis Anthonisz., p 201
- Jan de Hoey, p 202
- Bernard van Orley, p 203
- Hans Jordaens, p 204
- Adriaen Pietersz Crabeth, p 205
- Dirk Crabeth, p 205
- Wouter Crabeth I, p 205
- Cornelis IJsbrantsz Cussens, p 210
- Willem Thibaut, p 210
- Laurens van Kool, p 211
- Jacob Caan, p 212
- Jan Damesz de Veth, p 212
- Govert Hendriksz, p 212
- Cornelis van Haarlem, p 212
- Gerard van der Kuijl, p 212
- Jan Dirksz Lonck, p 212
- Aart Verhaast, p 212
- Dirk de Vrije, p 212
- Adriaen van der Spelt, p 213
- Hans von Aachen, p 214
- Otto van Veen, p 215

- Cornelia van Veen, p 219
- Gertruyde van Veen, p 219

- Jan Snellinck, p 219
- Jacob van Swanenburgh, p 221
- Isaac van Swanenburg, p 221
- Claes Isaacsz Swanenburg, p 222
- Willem Isaacsz Swanenburg, p 222
- Adam van Noort, p 222
- Adriaen van Nieulandt the younger, p 223
- Jan de Wael I, p 223
- Abraham Bloemaert, p 224
- Adriaan Bloemaert, p 227
- Hendrick Bloemaert, p 227
- Cornelis Bloemaert, p 228
- Tobias Verhaecht, p 229
- Michiel Jansz. van Mierevelt, p 230
- Pieter Dircksz Cluyt, p 234
- Klaudius Kornelisze, p 234
- Pieter van Mierevelt, p 234
- Pieter Geeritsz. Montfoort, p 234
- Paulus Moreelse, p 234
- Jan Woutersz van Cuyck, p 236
- Sebastian Vrancx, p 238
- Adam Elsheimer, p 240
- Hendrick Goudt, p 246
- Lucas Franchoys the Elder, p 247
- Roelant Savery, p 248
- Jan Baptist Biset, p 250
- Aart Jansz Druyvesteyn, p 251
- Adam Willaerts, p 251
- Willem Jacobsz Delff, p 252
- Peter Paul Rubens, p 253
- Jan Wildens, p 282
- Peter Snayers, p 295
- Anthony van Dyck, p 296
- Erasmus Quellinus II, p 310
- Pieter Soutman, p 316
- Cornelis Schut, p 317
- Jan van den Hoecke, p 318
- Samuel Hoffmann, p 318

- Magdalena Hoffmann named only as daughter of Hoffmann

- Maarten Pepyn, p 319
- Frans Wouters, p 319
- Abraham van Diepenbeeck, p 320
- Abraham Janssens, p 322
- Theodoor van Thulden, p 322
- Theodoor Rombouts, p 325
- Caspar de Crayer, p 327
- Dirk Rafaelsz Camphuysen, p 329
- Cornelius van Poelenburgh, p 333
- Jan van der Lijs, p 334
- Daniel Vertangen, p 334
- François Verwilt, p 334
- Alexander Keirincx, p 335
- Warnard van Rijsen, p 335
- Joris van Schooten, p 335
- Willem van Steenree, p 335
- Jacob Ernst Thomann von Hagelstein, p 336
- Pieter Feddes van Harlingen, p 337
- Hendrick ter Brugghen, p 337
- Pieter van Bronckhorst, p 339
- Adriaen van de Venne, p 340
- Johannes van der Beeck, p 341
- Daniel Seghers, p 343
- Jan Brueghel the Younger, p 346
- Hendrick van Balen, p 349
- Frans Snyders, p 350
- Frans Hals, p 352
- Adriaan van Stalbemt, p 352
- Dirck Hals, p 355
- Deodat del Monte, p 357
- Pieter Lastman, p 358
- Hendrick van der Burgh, p 362
- David Teniers the Elder, p 362
- Wenceslas Cobergher, p 363
- David Bailly, p 369
- Jacob Vosmaer, p 369
- Pieter de Valck, p 371
- Willem van der Vliet, p 372
- Willem van Nieulandt II, p 373
- Christiaen Jansz van Bieselingen, p 374
- Adriaen Brouwer, p 375
- Adriaen Cornelisz van Linschoten, p 375
- Lucas de Wael, p 376
- Wybrand de Geest, p 377
- Jacob Potma, p 378
- Gerard van Honthorst, p 379
- Adriaen de Bie, p 380
- Peter Snayers, p 380
- Cornelis de Wael, p 381
- Jacob Jordaens, p 382
- Dirk van Hoogstraten, p 386
- Lucas van Uden, p 386
- Jacob Franquart, p 389

- Anna Francisca de Bruyns, p 391

- Leonaert Bramer, p 392
- Jan van Goyen, p 393
- Pieter de Neyn, p 396
- Roelant Roghman, p 397
- Salomon de Bray, p 398
- Adriaen van Utrecht, p 400
- Wouter Crabeth I, p 401
- Huybrecht Jacobsz Grimani, p 401
- Johann Liss, p 402
- Jan Davidsz. de Heem, p 407

== Volume II ==
The engraved portraits included as illustrations in Volume II are below, followed by the artists listed in order of appearance in the text. The illustrations are all copied from Houbraken.

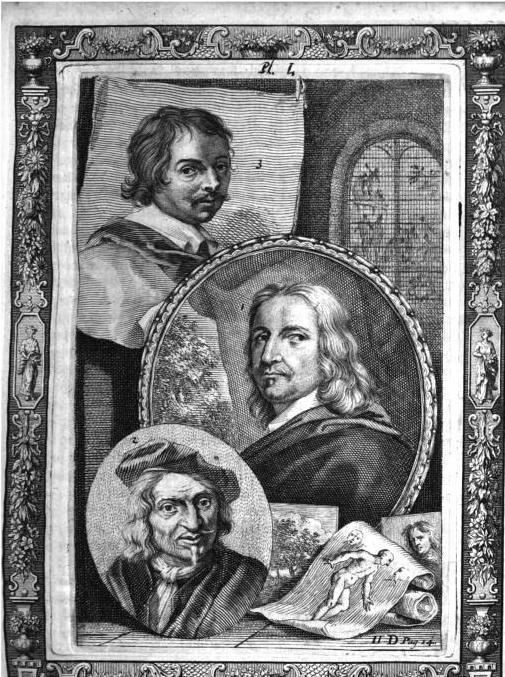
Philips de Champagne, Pieter Jansz van Asch, Jan van Bronkhorst

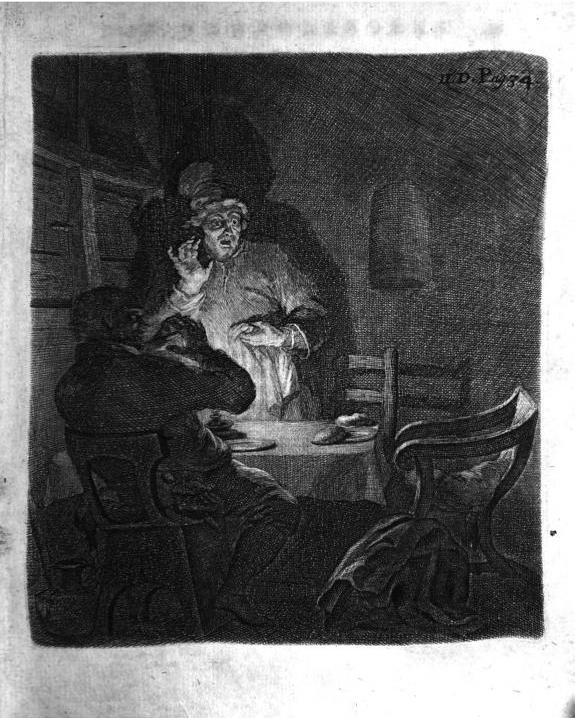
Disciples of Emaus

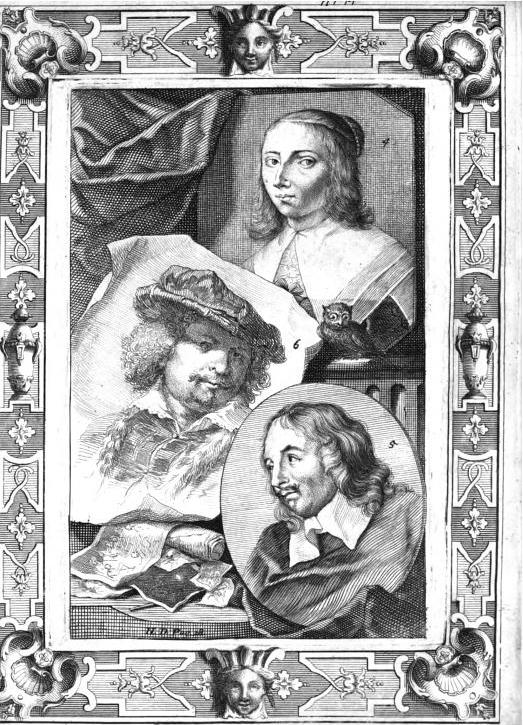
Rembrandt, Schuurman and Backer

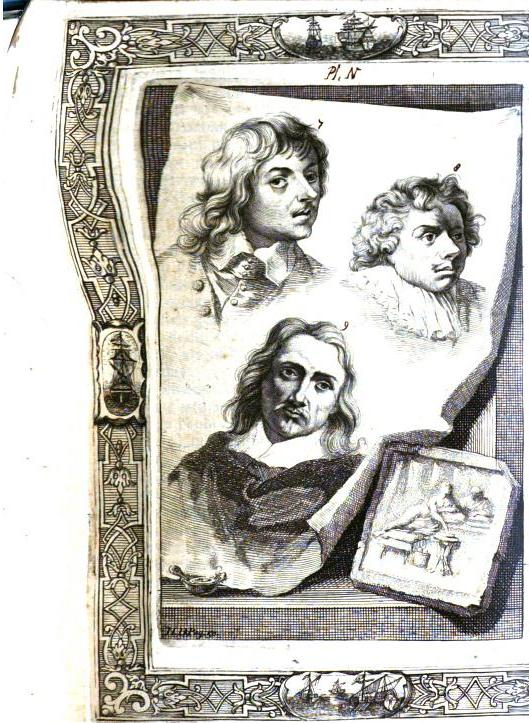
Jan Lievens, Palamedes Palamedesz, Erasmus Quellinus

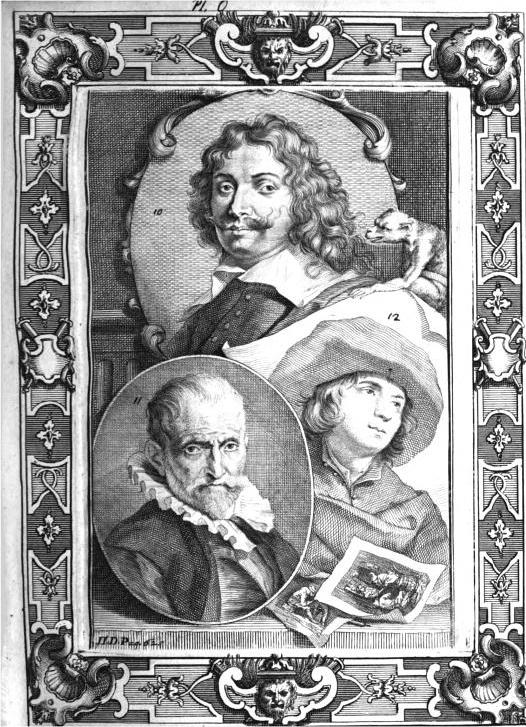
Adriaen Brouwer, Juriaan Ovens, Cornelis Bega

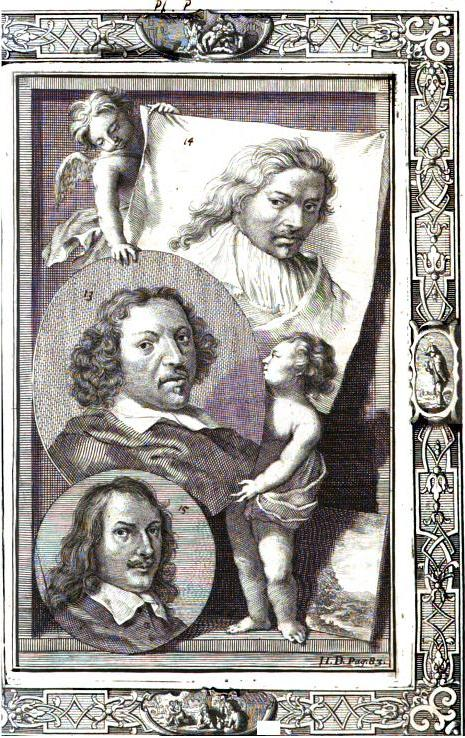
Herman and Cornelis Zachtleven, David Teniers

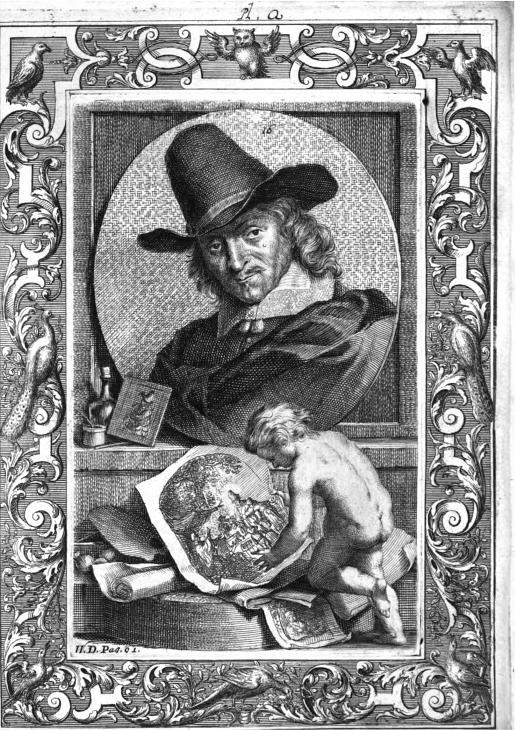
Adriaen van Ostade

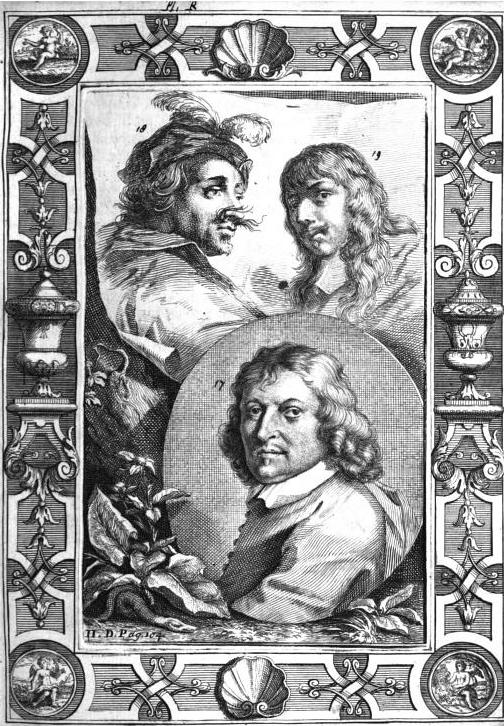
Otto Marseus van Schriek, Pieter van Laer, Nicolas van Helt Stockade

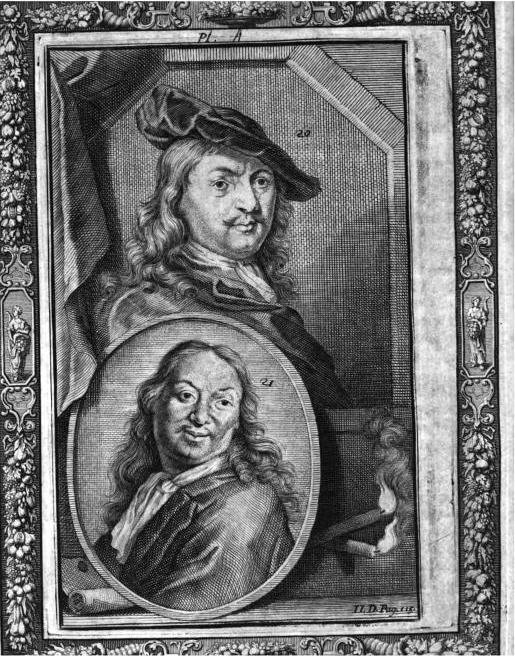
Gerard Dou and Bartolomeus van der Helst

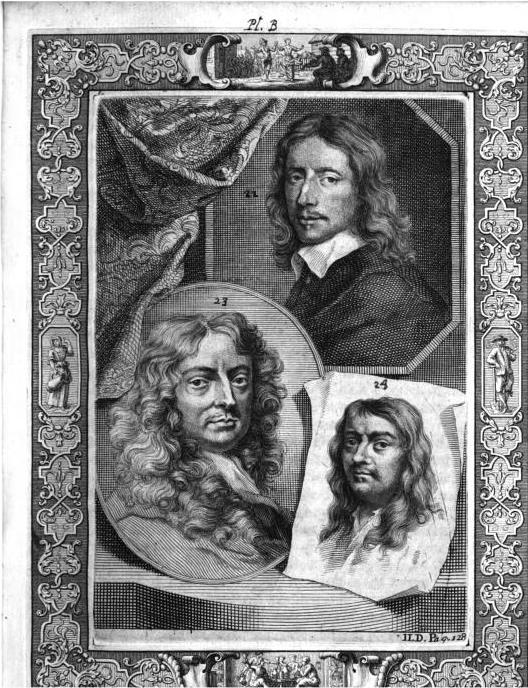
Govert Flinck, Peter Lely and Philip Koning

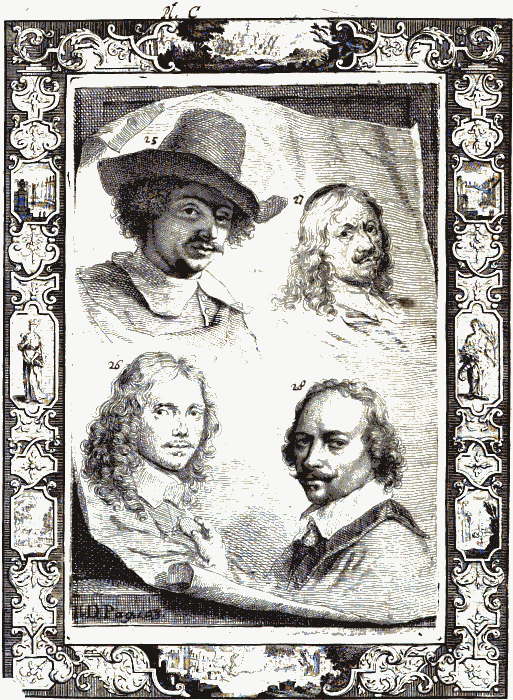
Jan Weenix, David Beck, Simon Peter Tilmans and Hendrik Zorg

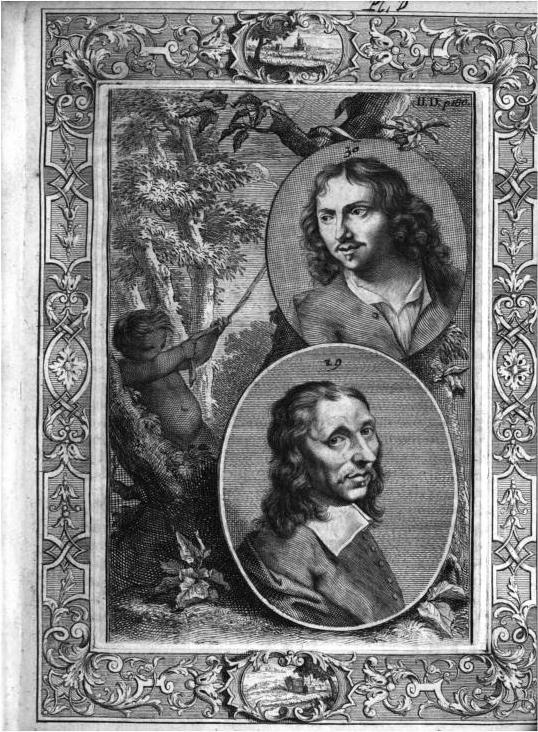
Allaert van Everdingen and Adam Pijnacker

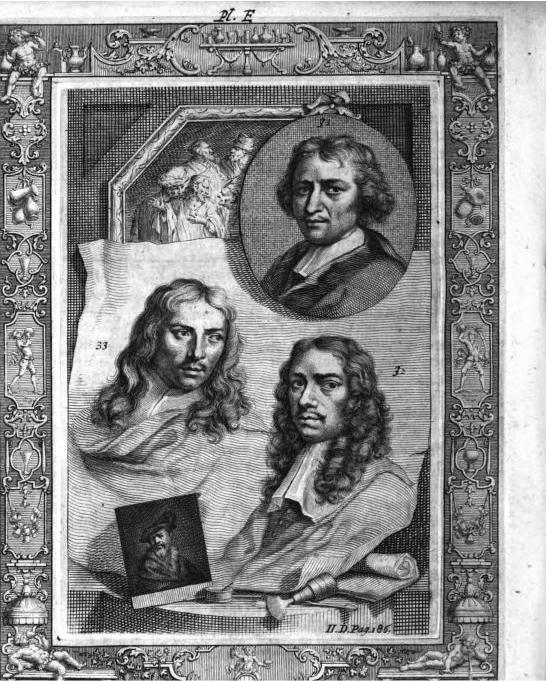
Gerbrand van den Eekhout and Wallerant and Jaques Vaillant

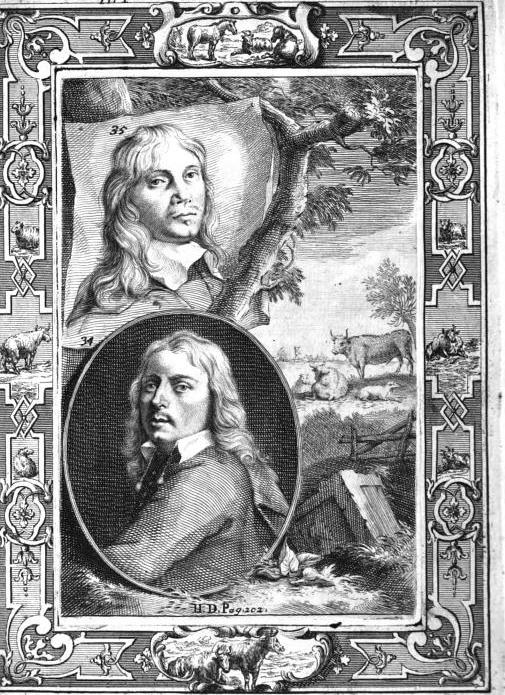
Paulus Potter and Jacob van der Does

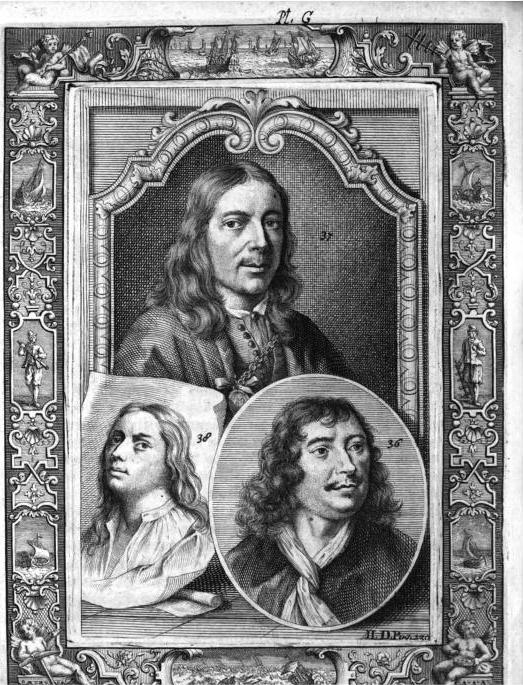
Johan Lingelbach en Samuel and Jan van Hoogstraten

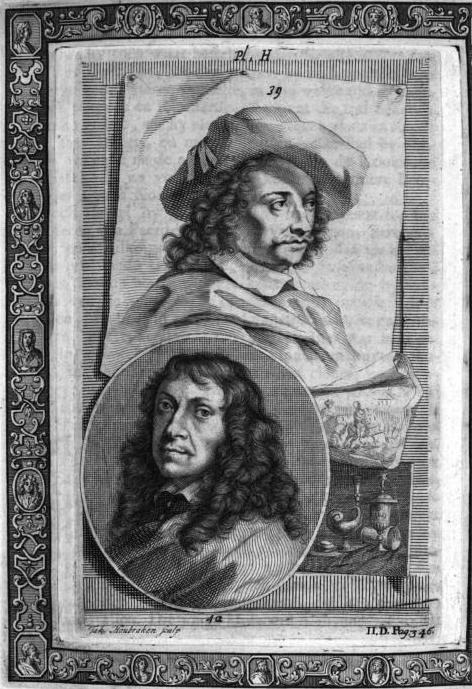
Hendrick Verschuuring and Willem Kalf

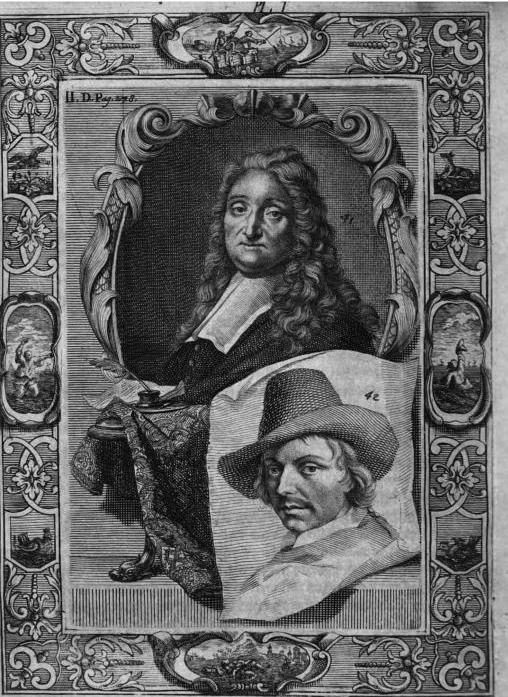
Ludolf Bakhuizen and Vincent van der Vinne

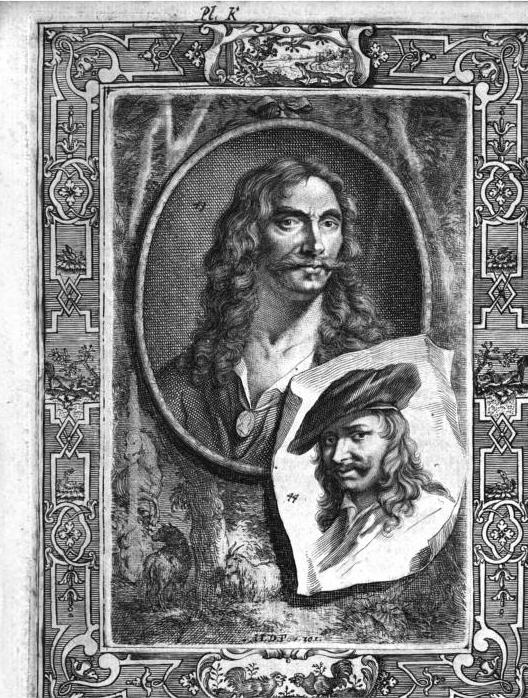
Johan Hendrik Roos and Juriaan van Streek

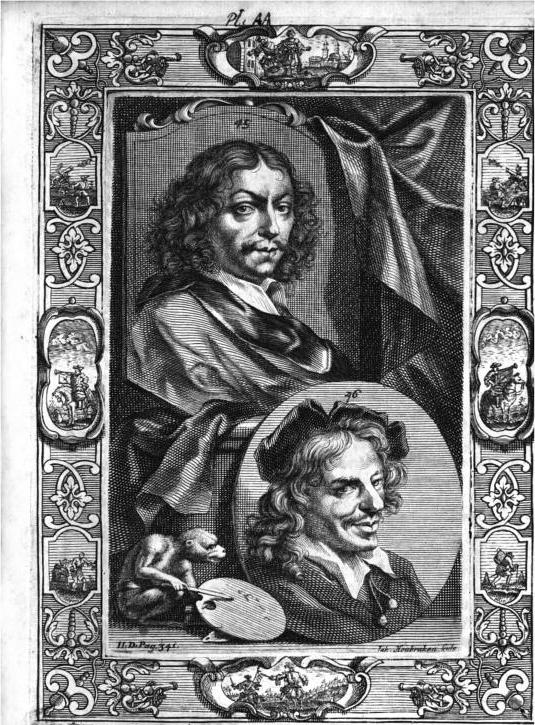
Frans van Mieris, Jan Steen

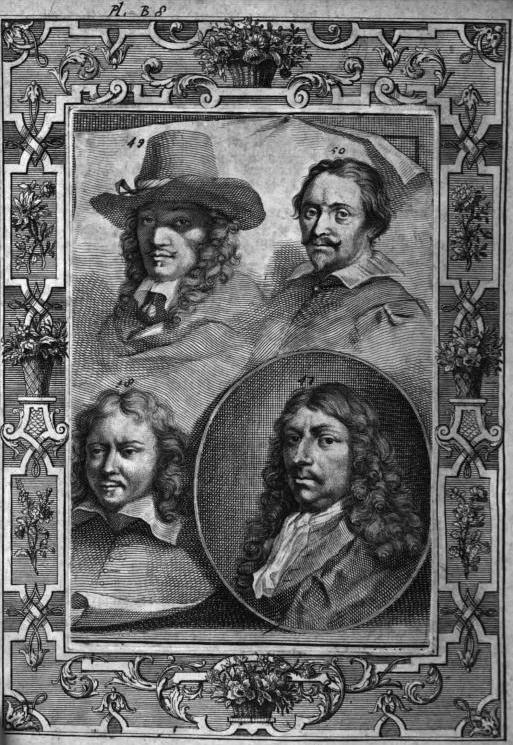
Gerard ter Burg, Gabriel Mitzu, Karel de Jardyn, Gillis de Hondekoeter

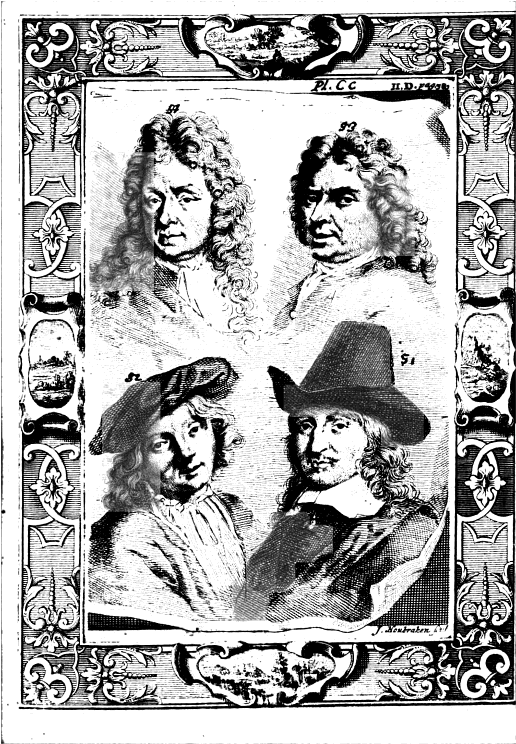
Jan Asselyn, Heyman Dullaart, Jan van Pée, Melch. de Hondekoeter

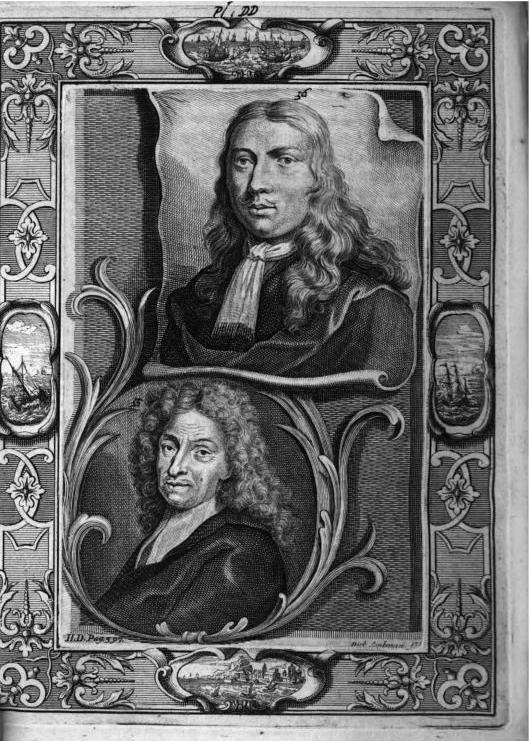
Abraham Genoels, Adrian van den Velde

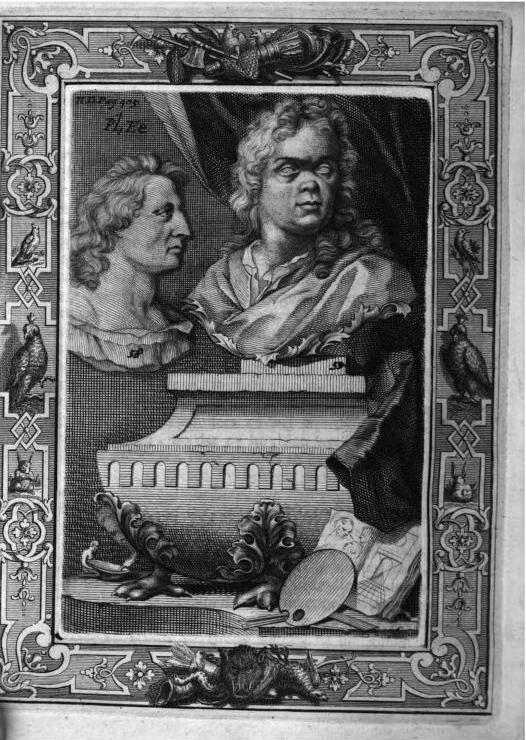
Gerard de Laires, Bartolet
- Jan Porcellis, p 1
- Jacob Pynas, p 2
- Jan Pynas, p 2
- Pieter de Molijn, p 3
- Werner van den Valckert, p 3
- Remigius van Rheni, p 4
- Lodewijk de Vadder, p 4
- Lucas Achtschellinck, p 5
- Andries van Eertvelt, p 5
- Martin Ryckaert, p 5
- Gillis Backereel, p 6
- Willem Backereel, p 6
- Jacob van Es, p 6
- Jan Wildens, p 7
- Jacob de Geest, p 8
- Pieter van de Plas, p 8
- Dirck van Baburen, p 9
- Gerardt Bartels, p 9
- Pieter Neeffs I, p 9
- Jacob van der Laemen, p 10
- Hendrick de Clerck, p 12
- Antoine Sallaert, p 12
- Denis van Alsloot, p 13
- Friedrich Brentel, p 13
- Abraham de Bruyn, p 13
- Justus van Egmont, p 13
- David de Haan, p 13
- Jacob van der Heyden, p 13
- Johann Hulsman, p 13
- Willem Mahue, p 13
- Abraham Matthijs, p 13
- Gillis van Tilborch, p 13
- Philippe de Champaigne, p 14
- Evert van Aelst, p 17
- Willem van Aelst, p 17
- Johannes van Bronckhorst, p 19
- Nikolaus Knüpfer, p 21
- Jan Cossiers, p 23
- Simon de Vos, p 23
- Pieter Jansz van Asch, p 24
- Jan van Bijlert, p 24
- Christiaen van Couwenbergh, p 24
- Daniel van Heil, p 25
- Jacob Gerritsz. Cuyp, p 25
- Aelbert Cuyp, p 26
- Peter Franchoys, p 27
- Luigi Primo, p 27
- Luigi Primo, p 27
- Peter Danckerts de Rij, p 27
- Rembrandt, p 28
- Christopher Paudiß, p 42
- Jürgen Ovens, p 43
- Franz Wulfhagen, p 43
- Pieter Moninckx, p 44
- Jan van de Velde, p 44
- Esaias van de Velde, p 45
- Emanuel de Witte, p 45
- Jan Lievens, p 50
- Pieter van der Willigen, p 50
- Ferdinand Bol, p 54
- Palamedes Palamedesz. (I), p 56
- Anna Maria van Schurman, p 57
- Adriaen Brouwer, p 62
- Joos van Craesbeeck, p 78
- Jacob Adriaensz Backer, p 80
- Bartram de Fouchier, p 82
- Herman Saftleven, p 83
- Cornelis Saftleven, p 86
- Salomon Koninck, p 87
- Jan Baptist van Heil, p 88
- Robert van den Hoecke, p 88
- David Teniers the Younger, p 89
- Adriaen van Ostade, p 91
- Isaac van Ostade, p 91
- Cornelis Pietersz Bega, p 92
- Leendert van der Cooghen, p 93
- Willem van de Velde the Elder, p 99
- Johannes Mytens, p 100
- Thomas Willeboirts Bosschaert, p 101
- Jan Dirksz Both, p 101
- Philips Augustijn Immenraet, p 101
- Pieter Jansz (1612-1672), p 101
- Thomas Willeboirts Bosschaert, p 101
- Otto Marseus van Schrieck, p 102
- Pieter van Laer, p 104
- Pieter van Laer, p 104
- Nicolaes de Helt Stockade, p 109
- Abraham Willaerts, p 110
- Jacques d'Arthois, p 111
- Gerrit Dou, p 113
- Claes Jacobsz van der Heck, p 120
- Bartholomeus van der Helst, p 121
- Jan Albertsz Rotius, p 123
- Bonaventura Peeters, p 124
- Jacob Rotius, p 124
- David Ryckaert III, p 125
- Matthias Jansz van den Bergh, p 126
- Jan Wyck, p 127
- Thomas Wijck, p 127
- Govert Flinck, p 128
- Pieter Pietersz Nedek, p 136
- Nicolaes Latombe, p 136
- Hans IV Jordaens, p 137
- Gillis Schagen, p 137
- Ludolf Leendertsz de Jongh, p 139
- Gonzales Coques, p 141
- Pieter de Hooch, p 141
- Peter Lely, p 142
- Peter Lely, p 142
- Juriaen Jacobsze, p 148
- Pieter Meert, p 149
- Antonie Waterloo, p 149
- Jan Philips van Thielen, p 151

- Maria Theresia Thielen
- Anna Maria Thielen
- Francisca Katharina Thielen

- Philip de Koninck, p 153
- Carel van Savoyen, p 153
- Jacob Willemsz Delff the Younger, p 154
- Zacharias Paulusz, p 154
- Jan Baptist van Deynum, p 156
- Adriaen Verdoel, p 156
- Philips Wouwerman, p 157
- Jan Baptist Weenix, p 163
- David Beck, p 170
- Alexander Cooper, p 173
- Hendrik Martenszoon Sorgh, p 173
- Jan Ariens Duif, p 174
- Aert van Waes, p 174
- Jacob Block, p 175
- Dirk Meerkerk, p 175
- Jan Donker, p 176
- Pieter Donker, p 176
- Caesar van Everdingen, p 177
- Allaert van Everdingen, p 178
- Jan van Everdingen, p 178
- Adam Pynacker, p 180
- Cornelis de Man, p 182
- Gerbrand van den Eeckhout, p 183
- Emanuel Murant, p 185
- Joris van Son, p 185
- Wallerant Vaillant, p 186
- Bernard Vaillant, p 188
- Jan Vaillant, p 188
- Jacob van der Does, p 189
- Jacques Vaillant (painter), p 189
- Dirck Helmbreker, p 193
- Nicolaes Pieterszoon Berchem, p 194
- Andries Both, p 198
- Pieter de Grebber, p 200

- Maria de Grebber

- Hendrik Gerritsz Pot, p 200
- Johannes Cornelisz Verspronck, p 200
- Floris van Dyck, p 201
- Cornelis Claesz van Wieringen, p 201
- Paulus Potter, p 202
- Hercules Seghers, p 206
- Jan van Kessel, senior, p 208
- Jan Peeters I, p 210
- Pieter Boel, p 211
- Gaspar van Eyck, p 213
- Jan van den Hecke, p 213
- Nicolaas van Eyck, p 214
- Philip Fruytiers, p 214
- Jan Siberechts, p 214
- Jan Fyt, p 215
- Anton Goubau, p 215
- Frans de Neve, p 215
- Alexander Adriaenssen, p 216
- Pieter Thijs, p 216
- Peeter vander Borght, p 217
- Karel Škréta, p 217
- Frans Ykens, p 217
- Johannes Ykens, p 217
- Gabriël van der Hofstadt, p 218
- Gysbrecht Thys, p 218
- Peter de Witte III, p 218
- Willem Gabron, p 219
- Johannes Lingelbach, p 219
- Nicolas-Pierre Loir, p 219
- Artus Wolffort, p 219
- Willem van Drielenburg, p 227
- Jan Worst, p 227
- Jacob Levecq, p 228
- Samuel Dirksz van Hoogstraten, p 230
- Jan van Hoogstraten, p 236
- Walther Damery, p 239
- Jan van Ossenbeeck, p 239
- Matthias Withoos, p 240

- Alida Withoos, p 242

- Johannes Withoos, p 242
- Pieter Withoos, p 242
- Hendrik Graauw, p 243
- Frans Withoos, p 243
- Pieter Gerritsz van Roestraten, p 244
- Hendrik Verschuring, p 246
- Willem Verschuring, p 250
- Jacob van der Ulft, p 251
- Jan Theunisz Blanckerhoff, p 253
- Jan Theunisz Blanckerhoff, p 253
- Barend Graat, p 254
- Vincent van der Vinne, p 260
- Maria van Oosterwijck, p 262
- Willem Kalf, p 265
- Cornelis Bisschop, p 268

- Catharina Bisschop *(named only as daughters of Cornelis Bisschop)
- Cornelia Bisschop*
- Sara Bisschop*

- Jacobus Bisschop, p 270
- Abraham Busschop, p 271
- Pieter van Bredael, p 271
- Peter Wolfgang van Ceulen, p 272
- Gerard van Zyl, p 274
- Willem Doudijns, p 276
- Adriaen van der Cabel, p 277
- Jan van Assen, p 279
- Ludolf Bakhuizen, p 279
- Benjamin Block, p 287
- Christoffel Pierson, p 288
- Katharina Rozee, p 291
- Willem Schellinks, p 293
- Nicolaes Maes, p 294
- Johann Heinrich Roos, p 298
- Theodor Roos, p 299
- Philipp Peter Roos, p 301
- Johann Melchior Roos, p 310
- Juriaen van Streeck, p 311
- Charles Emmanuel Biset, p 312
- Pieter Spierinckx, p 323
- Ottmar Elliger, p 327
- Jan de Baen, p 328
- Willem van de Velde the Elder, p 330
- Frederik de Moucheron, p 332
- Pieter Gallis, p 333
- Adam Frans van der Meulen, p 334
- Cornelis Kick, p 337
- Dirck Bleker, p 338
- Cornelis Brisé, p 338
- Frans Post, p 339
- Pieter Fris, p 340
- Johan van Nes, p 340
- Frans van Mieris the Elder, p 341
- Jan Steen, p 347
- Jan Linsen, p 366
- Gerard ter Borch, p 367
- Gabriël Metsu, p 372
- Johannes Spilberg, p 373
- Jan Hackaert, p 375
- Pieter van Anraedt, p 376
- Peeter Gijsels, p 377
- Karel Dujardin, p 378
- Rombout van Troyen, p 378
- Willem Drost, p 382
- Jacob Gillig, p 382
- Drost van Terlee, p 382
- Jasper Broers, p 383
- Joannes Philippus Spalthoven, p 383
- Jan Asselijn, p 384
- Jan Asselijn, p 384
- Jacob Isaakszoon van Ruisdael, p 384
- Ludowyk Smits, p 385
- Gillis d'Hondecoeter, p 387
- Melchior d'Hondecoeter, p 387
- Heiman Dullaart, p 389
- Jan van Neck, p 389
- Jan van der Heyden, p 391
- Abraham Mignon, p 392
- Adriaen van de Velde, p 395
- Abraham Genoels, p 397
- Jan van Pee, p 400
- Gerard de Lairesse, p 405

== Volume III ==
The engraved portraits included as illustrations in Volume III are below, including one of the "Vignettes", an engraving after a butterfly by Maria Sibylle Merian. The engravings are followed by the artists listed in order of appearance in the text. The portrait illustrations are all copied from Houbraken.

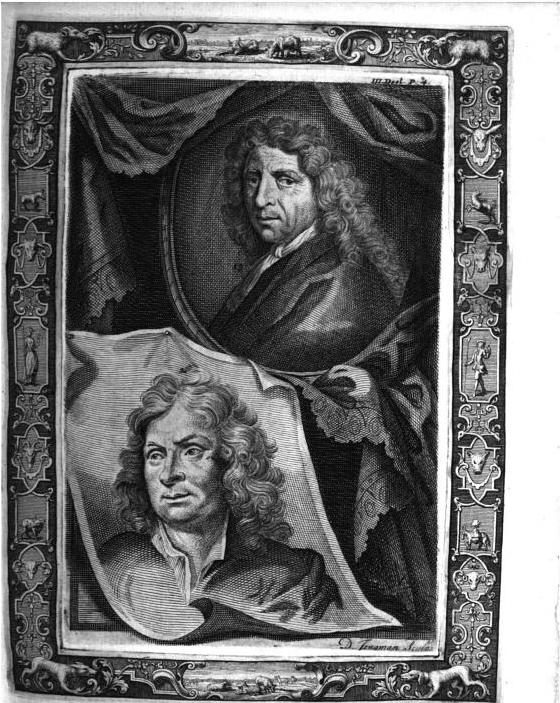
Jacob Torenvliet and Michiel van Musscher

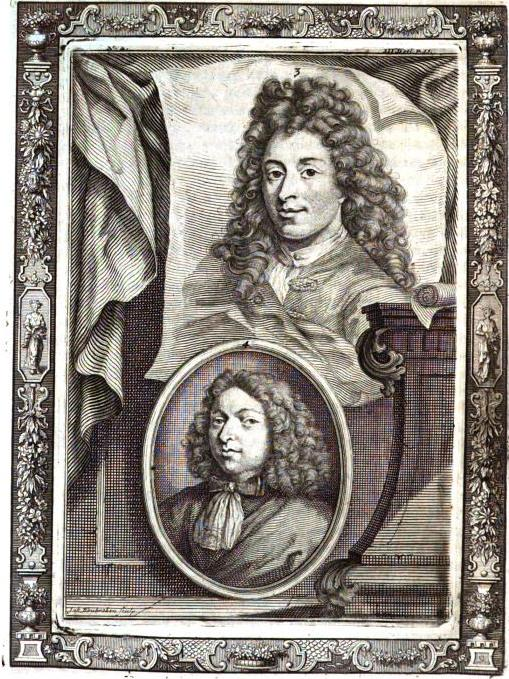
Godfried Schalcken and Philip Tideman

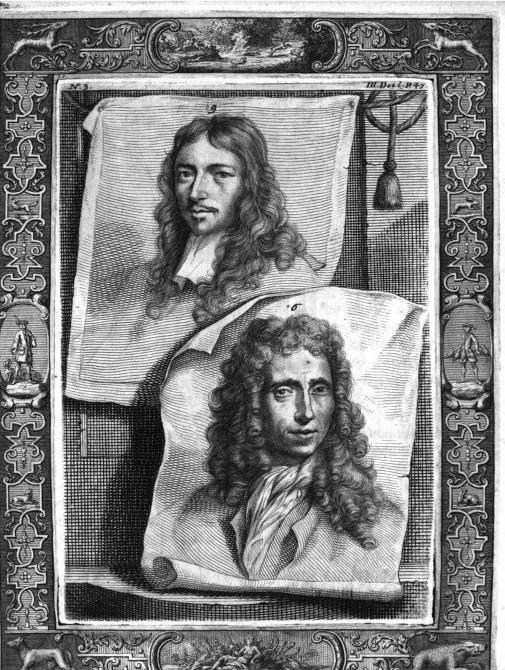
Jan de Bisschop and Johannes Voorhout

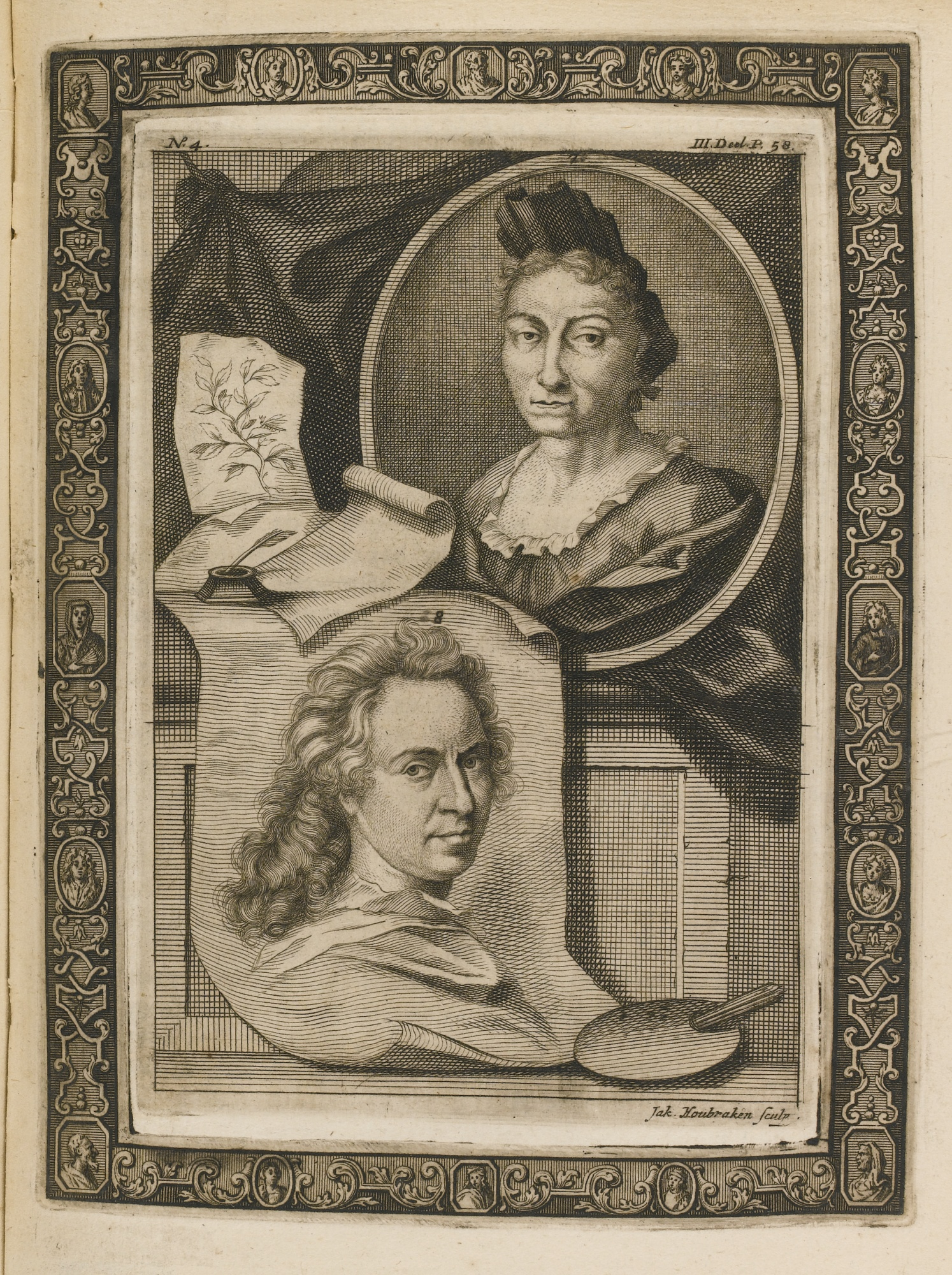
Maria Sybille Merian and David van der Plaas

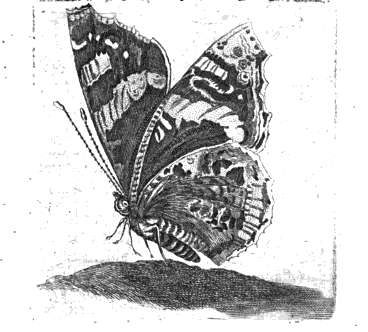
Plate of butterfly by Maria Sybille Merian

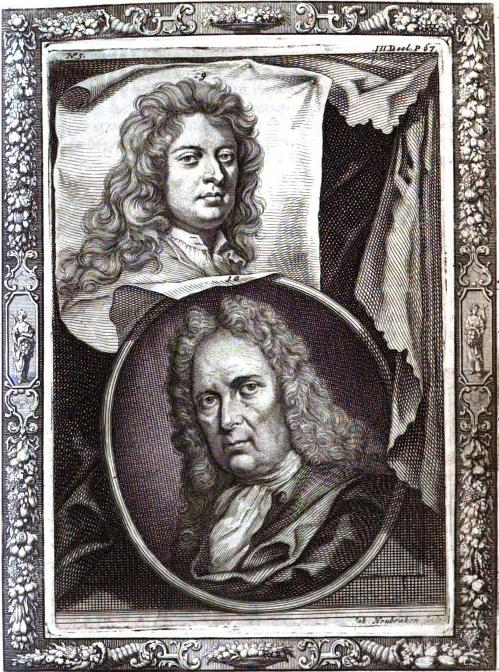
Godfried Kneller and Gerard Hoet

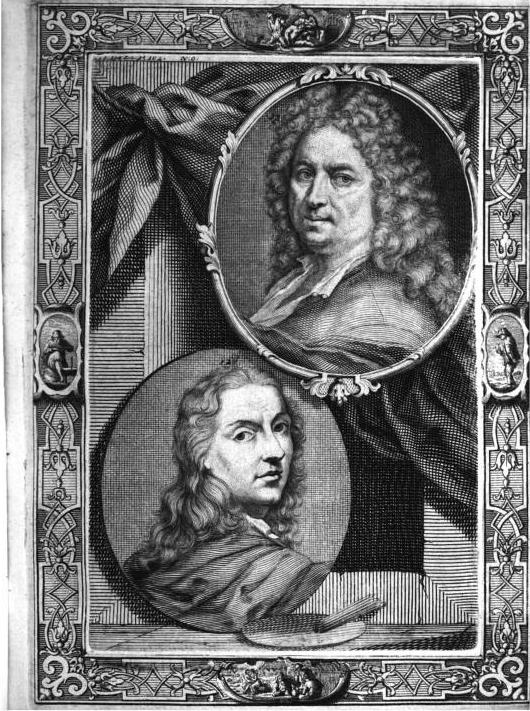
Matthys Wulfraat and Augustinus Terwesten

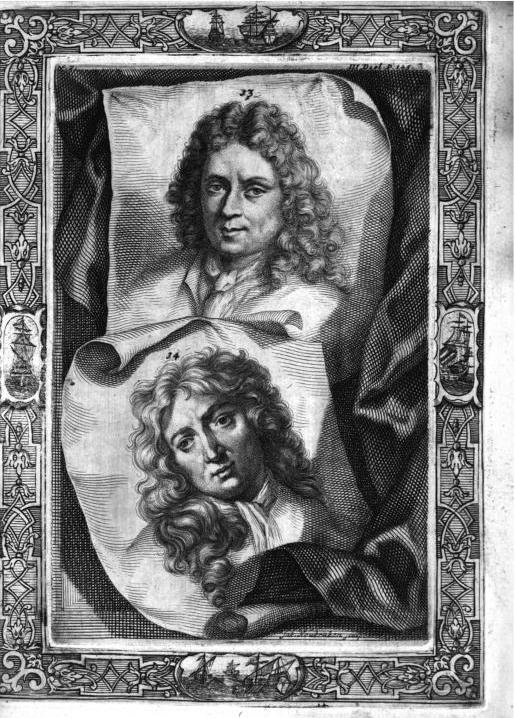
Johannes Verkolje and Abraham Hondius

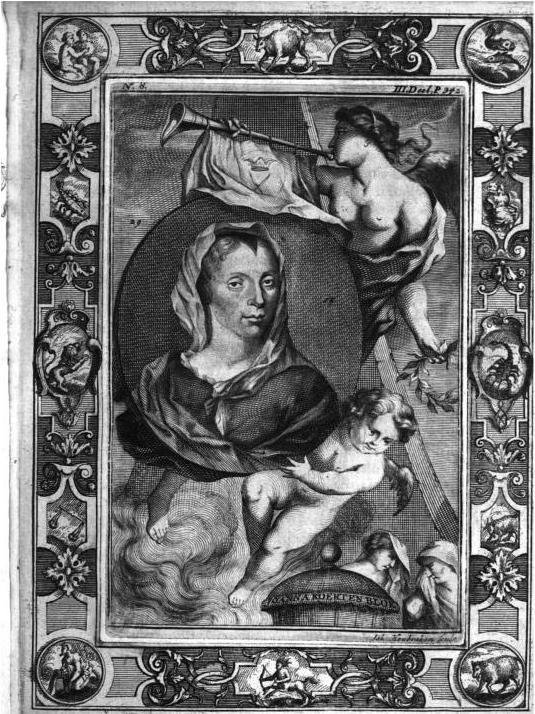
Joanna Koerten
- Pieter Cornelisz van Slingelandt, p 1
- Barend Appelman, p 3
- Ary de Vois, p 3
- Francisque Millet, p 4
- Jacob Toorenvliet, p 4
- Johannes van Haensbergen, p 6
- Isaac Paling, p 6
- Eglon van der Neer, p 8
- Godfried Schalcken, p 11
- Govert van der Leeuw, p 17
- Abraham van Calraet, p 20
- Pieter van der Leeuw, p 20
- Morten Steenwinkel, p 20
- Hendrik van Steenwijk II, p 21
- Pieter de Molijn, p 23
- Dirck Ferreris, p 24
- Adriaen Backer, p 26
- Horatius Paulijn, p 26
- Pieter Verhoek, p 27
- Gerrit Adriaenszoon Berckheyde, p 28
- Job Adriaenszoon Berckheyde, p 28
- Johannes Vorstermans, p 32
- Jan Soukens, p 36
- Francisque Millet, p 37
- Joris van der Haagen, p 39
- Aert de Gelder, p 41
- Jean Baptiste de Champaigne, p 45
- Albert Meijeringh, p 45
- Michiel van Musscher, p 46
- Jan de Bisschop, p 47
- Ary Huybertsz Verveer, p 48
- Jan van der Lijs, p 49
- Arnold Verbius, p 49
- Israel Covyn, p 54
- Reynier Covyn, p 54
- Hubert van Ravesteyn, p 54
- Johannes Glauber, p 55
- Johannes Gottlieb Glauber, p 57
- Maria Sibylla Merian, p 58
- Johannes Voorhout, p 61
- Jacob Denys, p 62
- Matthijs Naiveu, p 62
- David van der Plas, p 63
- Daniel Seiter, p 65
- Godfrey Kneller, p 67
- Geertgen Wyntges, p 85
- Jacob van der Roer van Dordrecht, p 88
- Adriaen Backer, p 89
- Gerard Hoet, p 90
- Johannes van Bronckhorst, p 94
- Abraham Diepraam, p 96
- Matthijs Wulfraet, p 102
- Huchtenburg, p 104
- Jacob Moelaert, p 108
- Jan Luyken, p 109
- Romeyn de Hooghe, p 114
- Jan van Nickelen, p 118
- Augustinus Terwesten, p 120
- Jan Verkolje, p 125
- Nikolaas Verkolje, p 128
- Jacob Koninck, p 132
- Johannes van der Bent, p 133
- Joost Cornelisz Droochsloot, p 133
- Pieter Jansz van Ruyven, p 134
- Mattheus Wijtmans, p 134
- Aert Jansz Marienhof, p 135
- Jan Vermeer van Utrecht, p 136
- Barent van Kalraet, p 137
- Dirk van Delen, p 138
- Rochus van Veen, p 138
- Abraham de Heusch, p 139
- Pieter van der Leeuw, p 139
- Johan Starrenberg, p 140
- Jacob de Wolf, p 140
- Joanna Koerten, p 142
- Willem van Ingen, p 153
- Nicolaes de Vree, p 156
- Abraham Hondius, p 157
- Francoys Dancx, p 159
- Jan van Oolen, p 159
- David Colijns, p 160
- Abraham Storck, p 160
- Barent Gael, p 161
- Pieter van der Hulst, p 162
- Isaac Koene, p 162
- Pieter Peutemans, p 163
- Cornelis Holsteyn, p 165
- Hendrik Rietschoof, p 165
- Jan Claesz Rietschoof, p 165
- Simon van der Does, p 166
- Jacob van der Does, p 168
- Krzysztof Lubieniecki, p 169
- Teodor Lubieniecki, p 169
- Jan Hoogsaat, p 175
- Johannes Vollevens, p 177
- Carel Fabritius, p 178
- Jan van Bunnik, p 179
- Jan Frans van Douven, p 182
- Simon Germyn, p 187
- Wilhelmus Beurs, p 188
- John Closterman, p 189
- Jan Griffier, p 191
- Cornelis Huysmans, p 195
- Willem Wissing, p 196
- Willem de Heusch, p 197
- Dirk Maas, p 197
- Jacob de Heusch, p 198
- Philip Tideman, p 201
- Ernst Stuven, p 204
- Elias van den Broeck, p 211
- Laurens van der Vinne, p 212
- Pauwels van Hillegaert, p 213
- Pieter de Ruelles, p 213
- Pieter Andreas Rijsbrack, p 214
- Jacob van Campen, p 217
- Pieter Verbrugghen I, p 220
- Hendrik Carré, p 228
- Bernardus van Schijndel, p 228
- Richard Brakenburgh, p 229
- Dirk Dalens, p 229
- Pieter de Bailliu, p 230
- Michiel Maddersteg, p 231
- Gerard van Opstal, p 231
- Justus van Huysum, p 233
- Nicolaes van Verendael, p 234
- Jean Baptiste Morel, p 237
- Jan Baptist de Crepu, p 239
- Simon Hardimé, p 245
- Simon Pietersz Verelst, p 248
- Maria Verelst, p 253
- Nicolas van Schoor, p 255
- Gerard Edema, p 256
- Dirck van der Bergen, p 258
- Ludowyk Smits, p 259
- Isac Vromans, p 260
- Arnold Verbius, p 265
- Cornelis Verelst, p 272
- Jacob Sucquet, p 278
- Dirk Maas, p 280
- Jan Frans van Son, p 282
- Bernard Salomon, p 283
- Dirk Dalens, p 285
- Ferdinand van Kessel, p 291
- Frans Ykens, p 304
- Nicolaes Lachtropius, p 309
- Erasmus Quellinus II, p 310
- Andries Pauli, p 314
- Johan Teyler, p 327
- Jan-Erasmus Quellinus, p 331
- Simon Du Bois, p 332
- Eduard Dubois, p 332
- Gysbert Andriesz Verbrugge, p 335
- Nicolas-Pierre Loir, p 336
- Hendrik Herregouts, p 337
- Johannes Bosschaert, p 339
- Adriaen Frans Boudewyns, p 341
- Pieter Bout, p 345
- Jan Janssens, p 346
- Jacob Leyssens, p 347
- Scheffers, p 351
- Jacob van den Bosch, p 355
- Jan Josef Horemans (I), p 358
- David de Haen, p 359
- Pieter Thijs, p 361
- Hendrik van der Straaten, p 365
- Pieter Thijs, p 366
- Jan Andreas Biset, p 367
- Jan Pauwel Gillemans the Elder, p 375
- Jan van Kessel, senior, p 379
- Cornelis van de Velde, p 386
- Cornelis de Heem, p 387
- Willem van Mieris, p 387
- Frans van Mieris the Elder, p 392
- Palamedes Palamedesz II, p 395
- Albert van Spiers, p 402
- Balthasar Denner, p 408
- Bartram de Fouchier, p 409

== Volume IV ==
Volume IV is split into two parts. After a long introduction mentioning several artists and ending with Francisque Millet, a list of painters follows beginning with Adriaen Hanneman, who took lessons at the Hague Academy and were members of the Confrerie Pictura. At the end of the Hague list, the book continues with new page numbering.

- Nicolas Poussin, p 8
- Carlo Maratta, p 8
- Augustinus Terwesten, p 8
- Mattheus Terwesten, p 8
- Charles Le Brun, p 8
- Peter Paul Rubens, p 10
- Anthony van Dyck, p 10
- Annibale Carracci, p 10
- Raphael, p 12
- Abraham Bloemaert, p 12
- Michelangelo, p 12
- Raphael, p 12
- Titian, p 12
- Antonio da Correggio, p 12
- Leonardo da Vinci, p 12
- Edward Francis Cunningham, p 19
- Nicolas van der Schoor, p 19
- Hans IV Jordaens, p 19
- Francisque Millet, p 26
- Adriaen Hanneman, p 38
- Jacob van der Does, p 38
- Gijsbert van Lybergen, p 38
- Frederick Sonnius, p 39
- Karel Dujardin, p 39
- Pieter Cosijn, p 39
- Melchior d'Hondecoeter, p 39
- Jacob Pijll, p 40
- Johan le Ducq, p 40
- Willem Doudijns, p 41
- Nicolaes Willingh, p 41
- Otto Hoynck, p 41
- Bartholomeus Meyburgh, p 41
- Jan Lievens, p 42
- Johan Bets, p 43
- Reinier de la Haye, p 43
- Caspar Netscher, p 43
- Willem Trouweelst, p 43
- François van Zandwijk, p 44
- Carel Codde, p 44
- Herman Verelst, p 44
- Simon Pietersz Verelst, p 44
- Christiaen Jansz. Dusart, p 45
- Marcus de Bye, p 45
- Jeronymus van Diest, p 46
- A. De Smet, p 46
- Isaac van Duynen, p 46
- Abraham Ragenau, p 46
- H van de Venne, p 46
- Theodor van der Schuer, p 46
- Martin Mijtens, p 47
- Isaac Mijtens, p 47
- Samuel Dirksz van Hoogstraten, p 47
- Rembrandt, p 48
- Gijsbert de Bije, p 48
- Johannes van Haensbergen, p 48
- Daniël Haringh, p 49
- Jacques Vaillant, p 50
- Nicolaes Lissant, p 50
- Daniel Mijtens the Younger, p 51
- Johannes Vollevens, p 51
- Louis Michiel, p 52
- Petro Rijs, p 53
- Simon Ruys, p 53
- Mathäus Meele, p 53
- Pieter van der Hulst, p 53
- Simon van der Does, p 54
- Jan Tilius, p 56
- Robbert Duval (1639–1732), p 57
- Wijnand Brand, p 57
- Abraham Begeyn, p 58
- Johannes Christoph Lotyn, p 59
- Constantijn Netscher, p 59
- Ezaias Terwesten, p 60
- Frans Beeldemaker, p 61
- Pierre Bourguignon, p 62
- Jacob Denys II, p 62
- Jan Hendrik Brandon, p 63
- Cornelis de Bruijn, p 63
- Hendrik Carré, p 66
- Richard van Bleeck, p 66
- Abraham van Hoogstraten, p 63
- Hendrik Carré II, p 66
- Coenraet Roepel, p 67
- Jan Brouwer (printmaker), p 67
- Carel Borchaert Voet, p 67
- Jacques Parmentier, p 67
- Nicolaes Hooft, p 68
- Pieter Hardimé, p 68
- Matthijs Pool, p 69
- Rachel Ruysch, p 69
- Adriaen van der Werff, p 70
- Hendrik van Limborch, p 70
- Dirk Kint, p 71
- Arnold Verbius, p 71
- Gaspar Peeter Verbruggen the Younger, p 72
- Jan van Gool, p 73
- Louis de Moni, p 75
- Willem Johan van Haensbergen, p 75
- Johannes van Haensbergen, p 75
- Johannes Vollevens II, p 75
- Gerard Hoet, p 75
- Jacob Schalcken, p 79
- Pellegrino Aretusi, p 79
- Philip van Dijk, p 82
- Jan Serin, p 82
- Huchtenburg, p 83
- Antonie de Waard, p 84
- Girolamo da Carpi, p 85
- Leonard François Louis, p 85
- Daniel Marot, p 85
- Pieter van Bredael, p 87
- Jacques Ignatius de Roore, p 87
- Abraham Carré, p 87
- Hendrik Carré II, p 87
- Mattheus Verheyden, p 87
- Peter van Call (II), p 88
- Johan Hendrik Keller, p 88
- Hermanus Wolters, p 89
- Theodor van Pee, p 89
- Jan Jacob Nachenius, p 89
- Balthasar Denner, p 89
- Herman Cuipers, p 92

=== Volume IV part two ===
- Carel de Moor, p 1
- Jan Laroon, p 28
- Marcellus Laroon, p 31
- Peter Casteels II, p 33
- Pieter Casteels III, p 35
- Arnold Frans Rubens, p 36
- Jan Claudius de Cock, p 47
- Michiel Carree, p 54
- Jan van Helmont, p 56
- Richard Collin, p 57
- Zeger Jacob van Helmont, p 58
- Richard van Orly, p 61
- Adriaen van der Werff, p 68
- Jan Pieter Eykens, p 87
- Jan Griffier, p 91
- Robert Griffier, p 92
- Bartram de Fouchier, p 98
- Pieter van Bredael, p 103
- Jacob de Wit, p 104
- Cornelis Troost, p 107
- Carel Borchaert Voet, p 111
- Nicolaas van Eyck, p 114
- Coenraet Roepel, p 121
- Gerard Melder, p 123
- Caspar Netscher, p 124
- Theodorus Netscher, p 140
- Constantijn Netscher, p 148
- Theodor van der Schuer, p 153
- Mattheus Terwesten, p 158
- Augustinus Terwesten, p 181
- Pieter Terwesten, p 182
- Adriana Verbruggen, p 183
- Jan van Gool, p 186
- Hendrick Danckerts, p 200
- Willem Wissing, p 201
- John Hoskins (painter), p 208
- Prosper Henricus Lankrink, p 211
- John Greenhill, p 219
- Cornelis Huysmans, p 221
- Abraham Cooper, p 223
- Remigius van Leemput, p 224
- Alexander Cooper, p 228
- Jacques Stella, p 229
- Adriaen Hanneman, p 247
- Ludowyk Smits, p 251
- Richard van Bleeck, p 254
- Pieter Gerritsz van Roestraten, p 260
- Jan Siberechts, p 263
- Nicholas Hilliard, p 265
- Wenceslaus Hollar, p 268
- Willem de Keyser, p 271
- Pieter van Mol, p 290
- Jan Miel, p 291
- Bartholomeus Breenbergh, p 293
- William Dobson, p 294
- Frederick Kerseboom or Causabon, p 299
- A Carlisle, p 302
- Adam Colonia, p 303
- Hendrik Colonia, p 304
- Jan de Beijer, p 306
- John Baptist Gaspars, p 314
- George Lambert (English painter), p 316
- Jan Looten, p 318
- Gerard Edema, p 321
- Nicolaes Willingh, p 324
- Cornelis Janssens van Ceulen, p 326
- Aleijda Wolfsen, p 326
- Jan Soest, p 329
- John Riley (painter), p 330
- Pieter Nason, p 333
- Carel Codde, p 335
- Aleija Wolfsen, p 336
- Jan van der Heyden, p 339
- Pieter Hermansz Verelst, p 340
- Johann Zacharias Kneller, p 342
- Egbert van Heemskerck, p 345
- Louis Ferdinand Elle the Younger, p 357
- Herman van der Mijn, p 359
- Leonard François Louis, p 363
- Pieter Hardimé, p 375
- Gerard Wigmana, p 375
- Frank Pieterse Verheyden, p 380
- Jacques Ignatius de Roore, p 384
- Dirk Kint, p 389
- Mathäus Meele, p 390
- Theodoor van Pee, p 391
- Schets Van Het Zolderstuk, p 397
- Henrietta Wolters van Pee, p 402
- Cornelis Beeldemaker, p 405
- Jacob Campo Weyerman, p 409
- Henriëtta van Pee, p 432
