= Philip Duval (painter) =

French painter

- Occupation: Painter

Philip Duval (died 1709?) was a French painter.

== Biography ==
Duval is stated to have been a native of France, a pupil of Charles le Brun, and to have studied painting in Venice and Verona, forming his style on the great painters of those towns. He settled in England about 1670, and practised for some years in London. In 1672, he painted for the Duchess of Richmond a picture of ‘Venus receiving from Vulcan the armour for Æneas.’ Having a taste for chemistry, he wasted most of his time and substance in the practice of it. He was assisted by the Hon. Robert Boyle, who gave him a small annuity, but after that gentleman's death he fell into great want, and his mind became disordered. He is stated to have died in London about 1709, and to have been buried at St. Martin's-in-the-Fields. In the gallery of M. Boyer d'Aguilles were two pictures by Duval, representing ‘Europa’ and ‘Leda’ (both engraved by J. Coelemans). Mariette attributes these to Duval, but it is probable that they should be ascribed to Robert Duval (1644–1732), born at the Hague, and a pupil of N. Wieling, who studied at Rome and Venice, especially in the style of Pietro da Cortona.
