= François Verwilt =

Dutch painter (c.1623–1691)

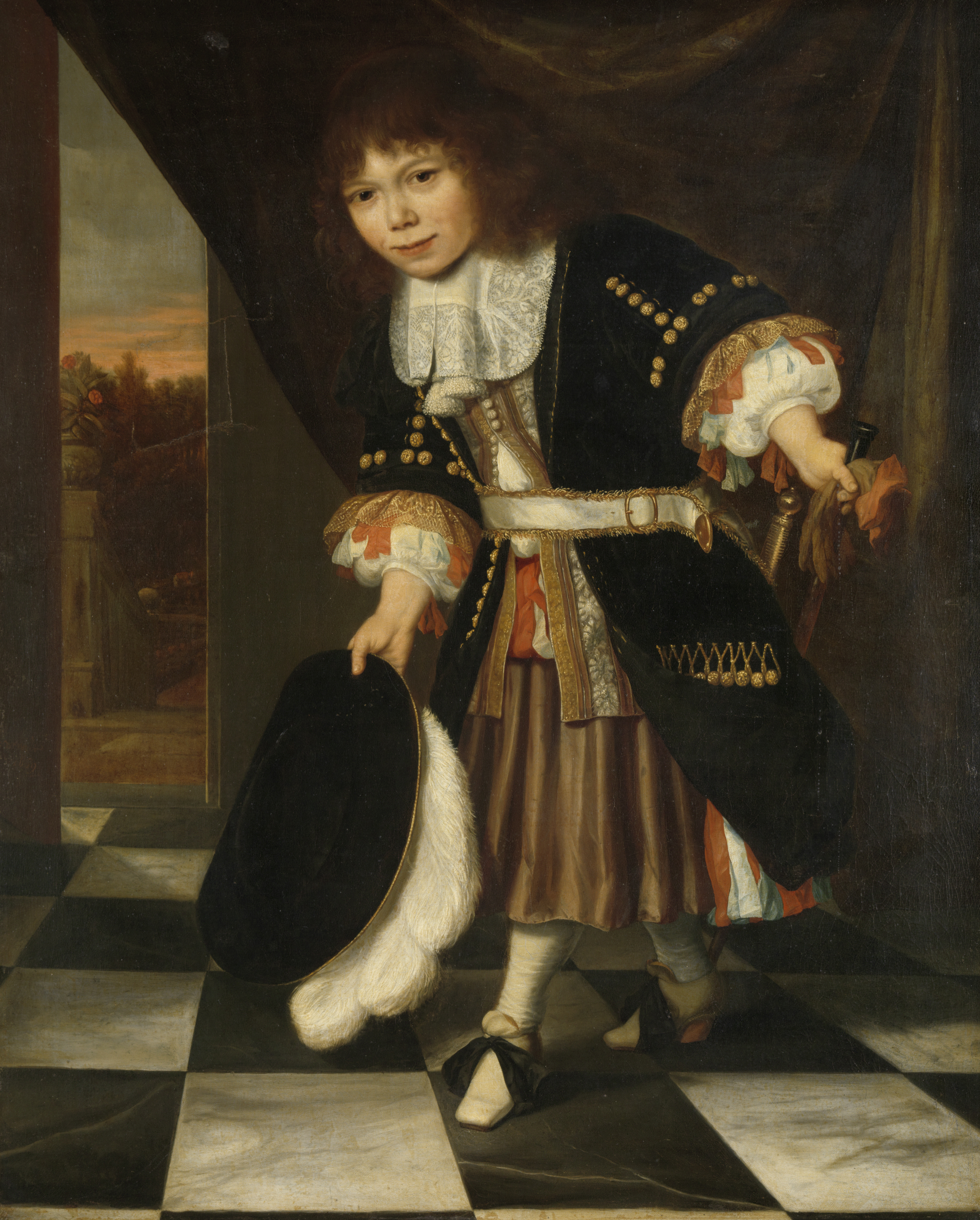
Portrait of a boy at full length, 1669, Rijksmuseum

Francois (Frans) Verwilt (c.1623 in Rotterdam - 8 August 1691 in Rotterdam) was as a Dutch Golden Age landscape painter.

== Biography ==
He was the son of the painter Adriaan Verwilt of Antwerp and was apprenticed to Cornelius van Poelenburgh (1594–1667) in Utrecht together with Jan van der Lijs, among others. He is considered part of the "Poelenburch landscape school". According to Houbraken, who mentioned him as a pupil of Van Poelenburch, he painted the flesh tones of his figures in the manner of another Poelenburch pupil from The Hague, Daniel Vertangen. Houbraken commented however that Joachim von Sandrart claimed he had been a pupil of Kornelio van Bojo Leubourys. Cornelis de Bie wrote a poem about his figures drawn in the manner of Poelenburch that tempted Princes, Kings, and Dukes.

== Works ==
According to the RKD he lived mostly in Rotterdam, but is registered in Zeeland, where he worked in Vlissingen, Middelburg, and Veere. He became a member of the Guild of St. Luke in Middelburg in 1661, and became a member of the Veere guild in 1667, probably to sell paintings in those towns. Most of the pieces currently attributed to him are portraits and genre works, including village scenes of daily life.

Verwilt became a versatile painter in many genres including historical, mythical and biblical landscapes, genre works, portrait, still life and contemporary interiors of farming and urban middle class life. His colors range from the style of Poelenburgh in his landscapes to the chiaroscuro of Rembrandt in depictions of Dutch contemporary life.

His paintings are represented in many museums, including museums in Amsterdam, Rotterdam, Haarlem, Budapest, Leningrad, Mainz, Osnabrück, Paris, Vienna and elsewhere. There are no biographies or monographs of his works.

Verwilt lived most of his life in Rotterdam and his pupils were Cornelis Cingelaar and Pieter Hovius. He died in 1691 in Rotterdam.

== Sources ==
- Darmstaedter. Robert. Reclam Künstlerlexikon. Stuttgart: Reclam, 2002.
- Thieme, Ulrich und Felix Becker, hg. Allgemeines Lexikon der bildenden Künste von der Antike bis zur Gegenwart. Leipzig: Seemann, 1978.
- Willingen, Adriaan van der and Fred G. Meijer. A Dictionary of Dutch and Flemish Still-Life Painters Working in Oils, 1525-1725. Leiden: *Primavera Press 2002.
- Wurzbach, Alfred von. Niederländisches Künstlerlexikon. 4 Bde. Wien, Leipzig: Halm & Goldmann, 1906-11.
