= Francoys Dancx =

Dutch Golden Age painter

Francoys Dancx or Danks (1636, Amsterdam – 1703, Amsterdam), was a Dutch Golden Age painter.

== Biography ==
According to Houbraken he travelled to Rome and joined the Bentvueghels with the nickname "Schildpad" (turtle). He painted a portrait of the Amsterdam poet Catharina Questiers and sculpted a relief of an hourglass with the motto "Myn Glas loopt Ras" ("my glass drains fast") that was installed on a house on the Herengracht in Amsterdam, and both of these artworks were the subject of poems themselves by the Amsterdam poets Cornelis van Ryssen and Jan Koenerding.

According to the RKD he left Amsterdam for Indonesia in 1676. There he drew landscapes that were later published in 1682 in Johan Nieuhof's book called 'Zee- en lantreize door verscheidene gewesten von Oost Indien' ("Sea and land journey through the East Indies").
