= Nicolas-Pierre Loir =

French painter and engraver (1624–1679)

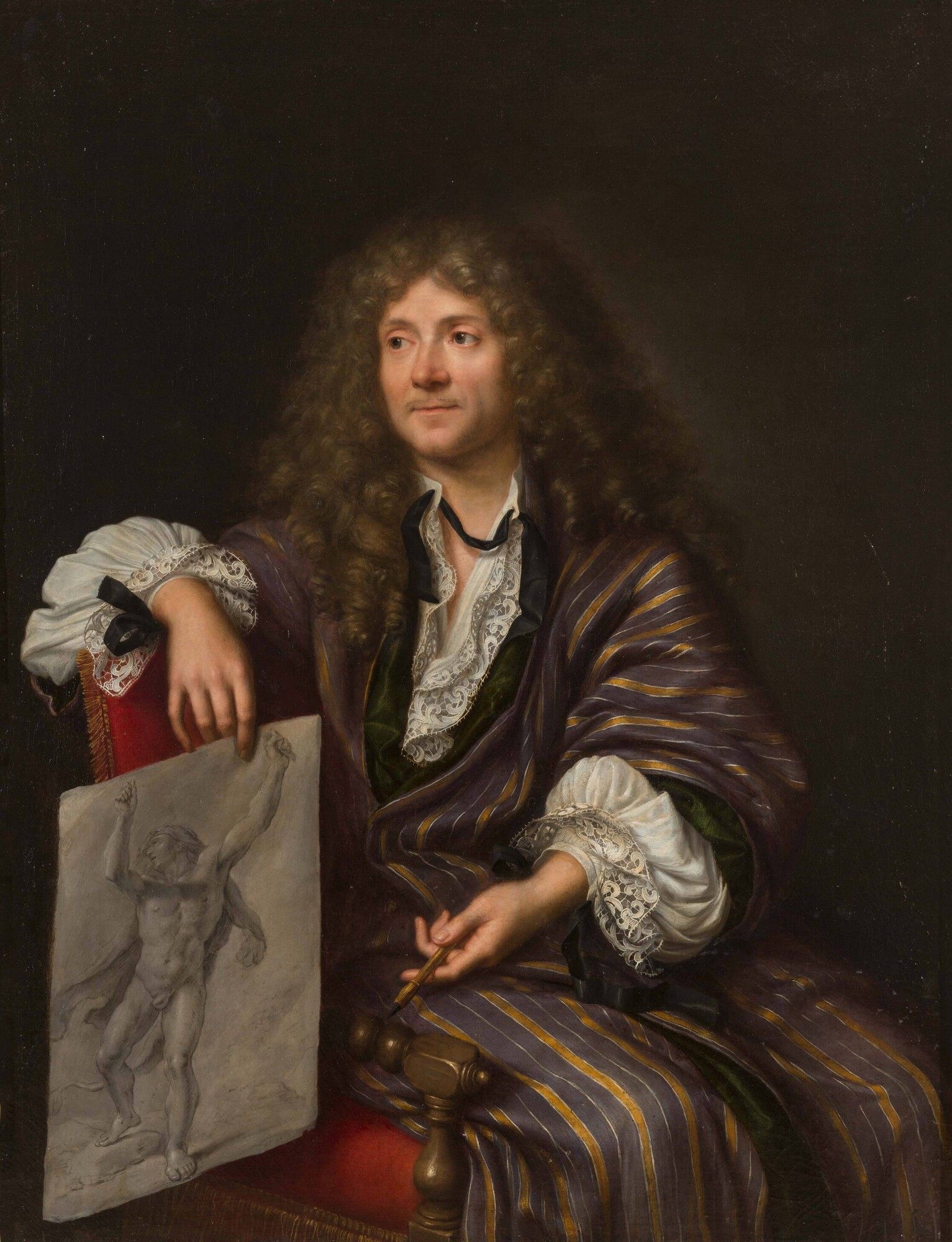
Portrait by Jean Tiger, 1675

Nicolas Pierre Loir (1624 – 1679) was a French painter and engraver of religious and historical allegories.

== Biography ==
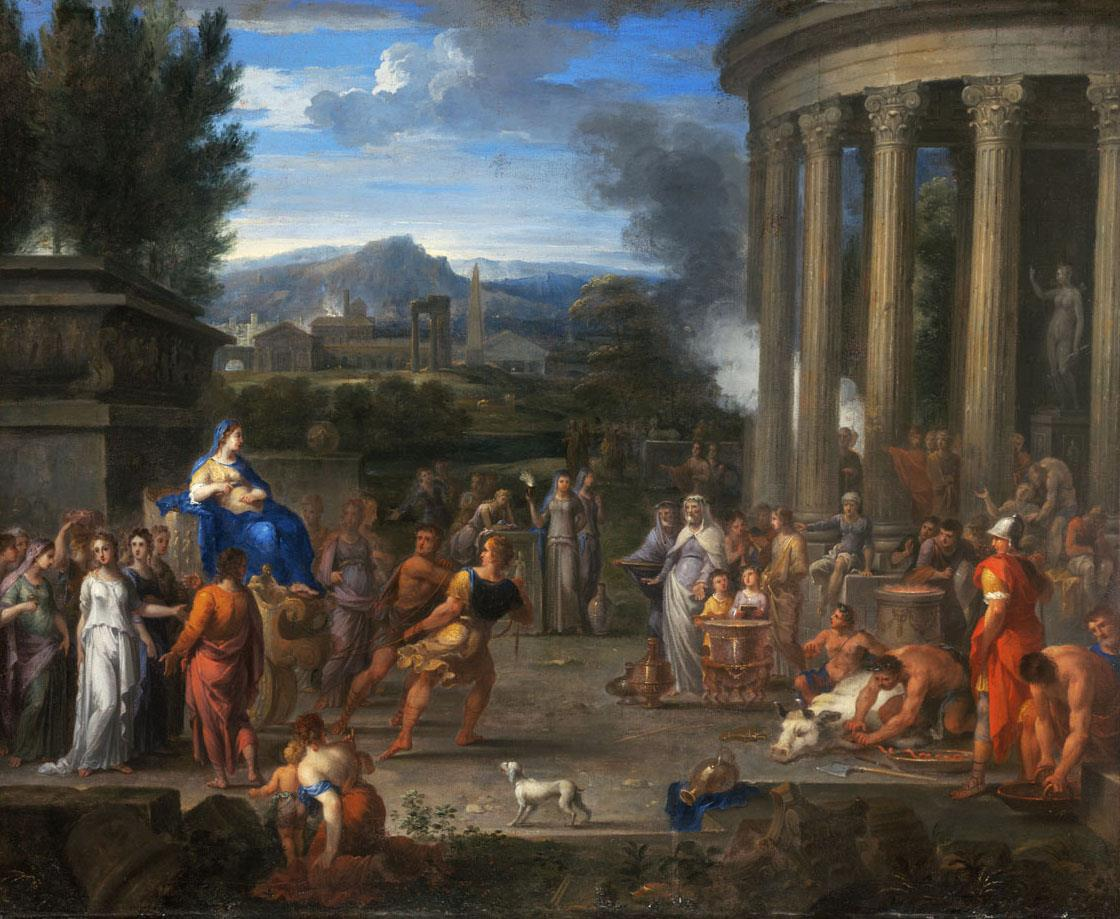
Kleobis and Biton.

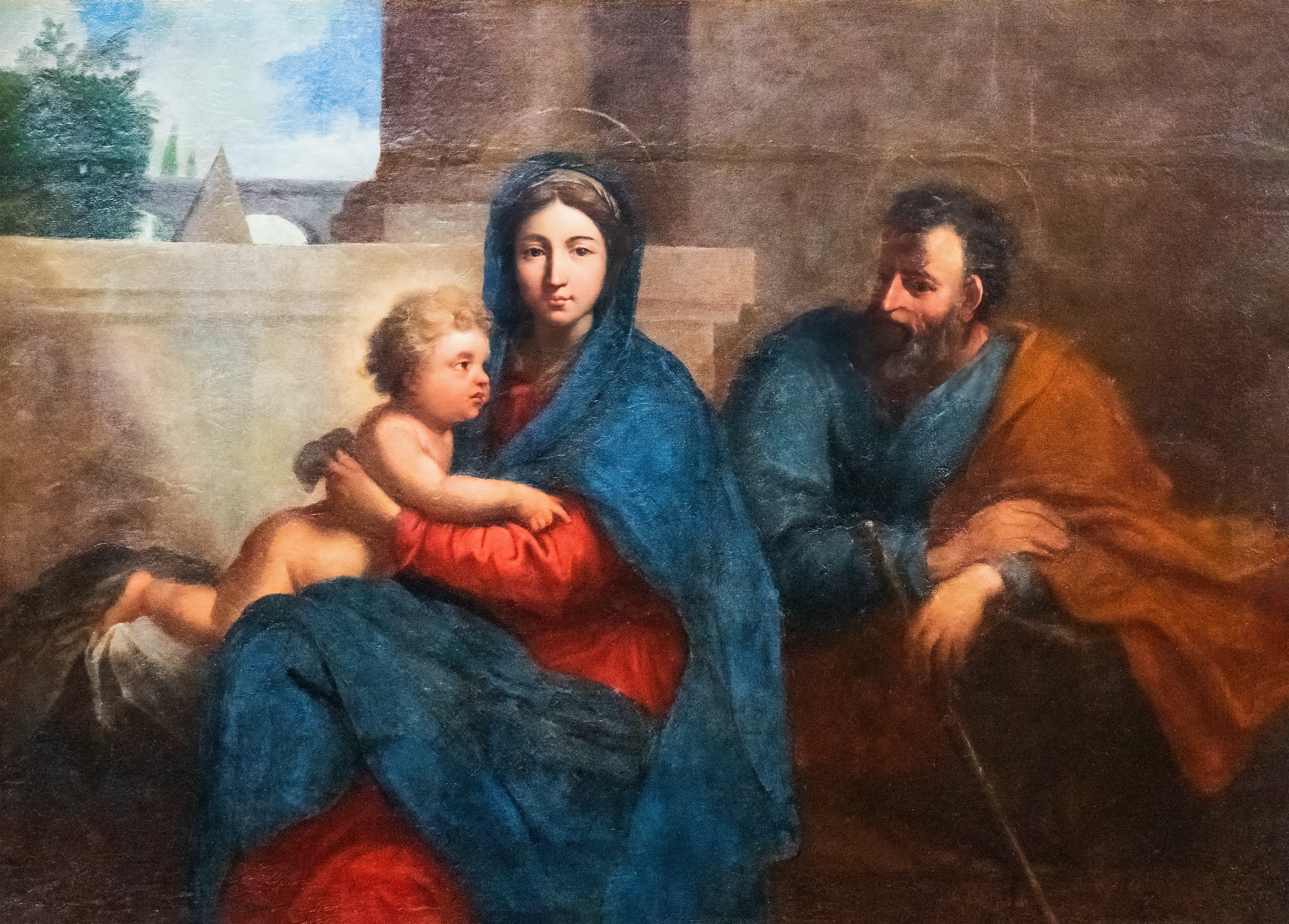
Holy Family

Loir was born and died in Paris. According to the RKD he was a pupil of Sébastien Bourdon and Simon Vouet, who later became a follower of Nicolas Poussin. He travelled to Italy in the years 1647–1649, and in 1650 was back in Paris. In 1669 his pupil François de Troy married his sister-in-law, Jeanne Cotelle. Roger de Piles included him in his list of notable French artists, noting that he was the son of a goldsmith and a very good draughtsman.
