= Pieter de Ruelles =

Dutch painter

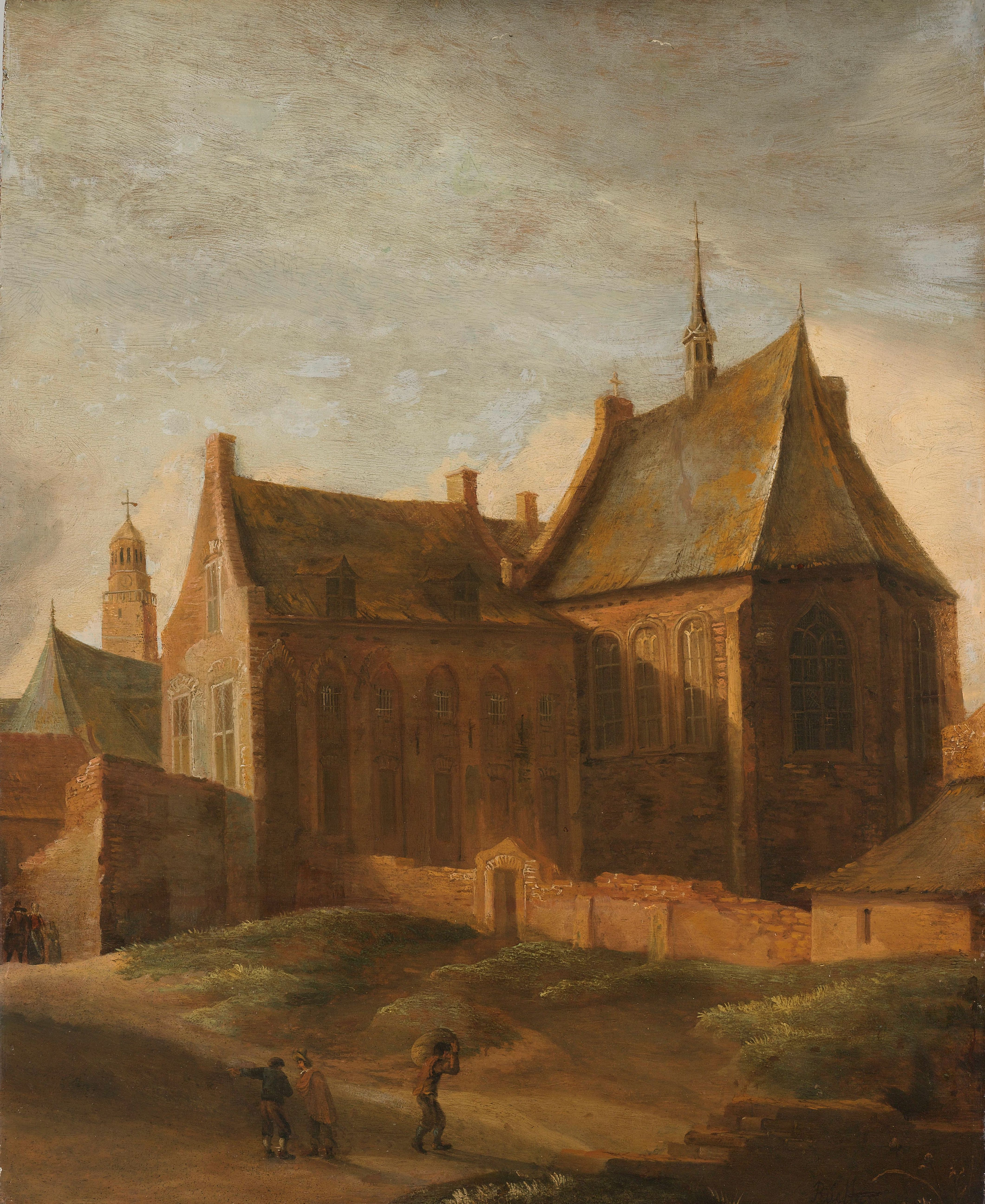
The Agnietenklooster in Utrecht (today's Centraal Museum), 1650s

Pieter de Ruelles (1630 in Amsterdam – 1658 in Amsterdam), was a Dutch Golden Age landscape painter who died young.

== Biography ==
According to Houbraken, who only included him for the poem published by the art school of Amsterdam that mourned him on his death in 1658, he never saw his artwork, but noted that he must have been a poet as well as a painter, from the way the poem was written.

According to the Netherlands Institute for Art History, he made Italianate landscapes. He declared he was 24 years old on 28 February 1654 when he became engaged to Dirckje Jans from Zutphen.
