= Bartram de Fouchier =

Dutch Golden Age painter

Bartram de Fouchier (February 14, 1609 – August 25, 1673) was a Dutch Golden Age painter.

== Biography ==
Fouchier was born in Bergen op Zoom. Houbraken remarked that his father was a Frenchman who had come to visit the Netherlands for the Siege of Calais in 1596 and stayed for the Siege of Ostend (1601–1603). The fighting lasted so long that the elder Fouchier had time to fall in love with a young heiress from Bergen op Zoom and he settled there after the war. When the young Bartram came of age, he wanted to learn painting, so his father sent him to Antwerp to study with Anthony van Dyck. He learned to paint a good portrait there, but since this was the period that Van Dyck had very little time for pupils, Fouchier left his workshop and travelled to Utrecht in 1634 to study with Jan van Bijlert, where he stayed for two years.

He first returned home to Bergen op Zoom, but then he left again to make a Grand Tour to Italy, where in Rome he was accused of heresy together with his companion Jan van Isendoorn. They fled to Florence, where they stayed a short while before leaving for Paris, and shortly after that to Antwerp, where they parted company forever. Fouchier returned to Bergen op Zoom and at first tried to make a living at painting in the manner of Tintoretto, but he had more success with genre pieces in the manner of Adriaen Brouwer. He was buried in the Grote Kerk of Bergen op Zoom. According to the RKD, he was trained by Jan van Bijlert and traveled to Italy with Jan van Isendoorn.
