= Jacob de Wolf =

Dutch painter

Jacob de Wolf (1630, in Groningen – 1685, in Groningen), was a Dutch Golden Age painter.

== Biography ==
According to Houbraken he was a friend of the painter Johan Starrenberg. Unable to gain favor with buyers, he became depressed when he saw the works of lesser painters selling for higher prices than his own work. He planted a bayonet pointed upwards in the corner of his room, and fell backwards upon it, and this suicide spurred the poet Lud. Smids to make two poems in his memory.

According to the RKD he is possibly the same person as J. de Wolf, a draughtsman specialized in genre pieces and farm scenes, who followed Gerrit Adriaensz De Heer.
