= Johan Starrenberg =

Dutch painter

Johan Starrenberg (c1650, Groningen – after 1691, The Hague), was a Dutch Golden Age painter.

== Biography ==
According to Houbraken he painted rough portraits that were "better seen from a distance", and enjoyed the patronage of the Stadtholder of Friesland, Henry Casimir II, Prince of Nassau-Dietz. He was a friend of the painter Jacob de Wolf who commit suicide in 1685.

According to the RKD he was in Groningen from 1670 to 1681, and in 1681 he became a member of the Confrerie Pictura in the Hague, where he was also registered from 1690 to 1691.
