= Jacques Vaillant (painter) =

Dutch Golden Age painter

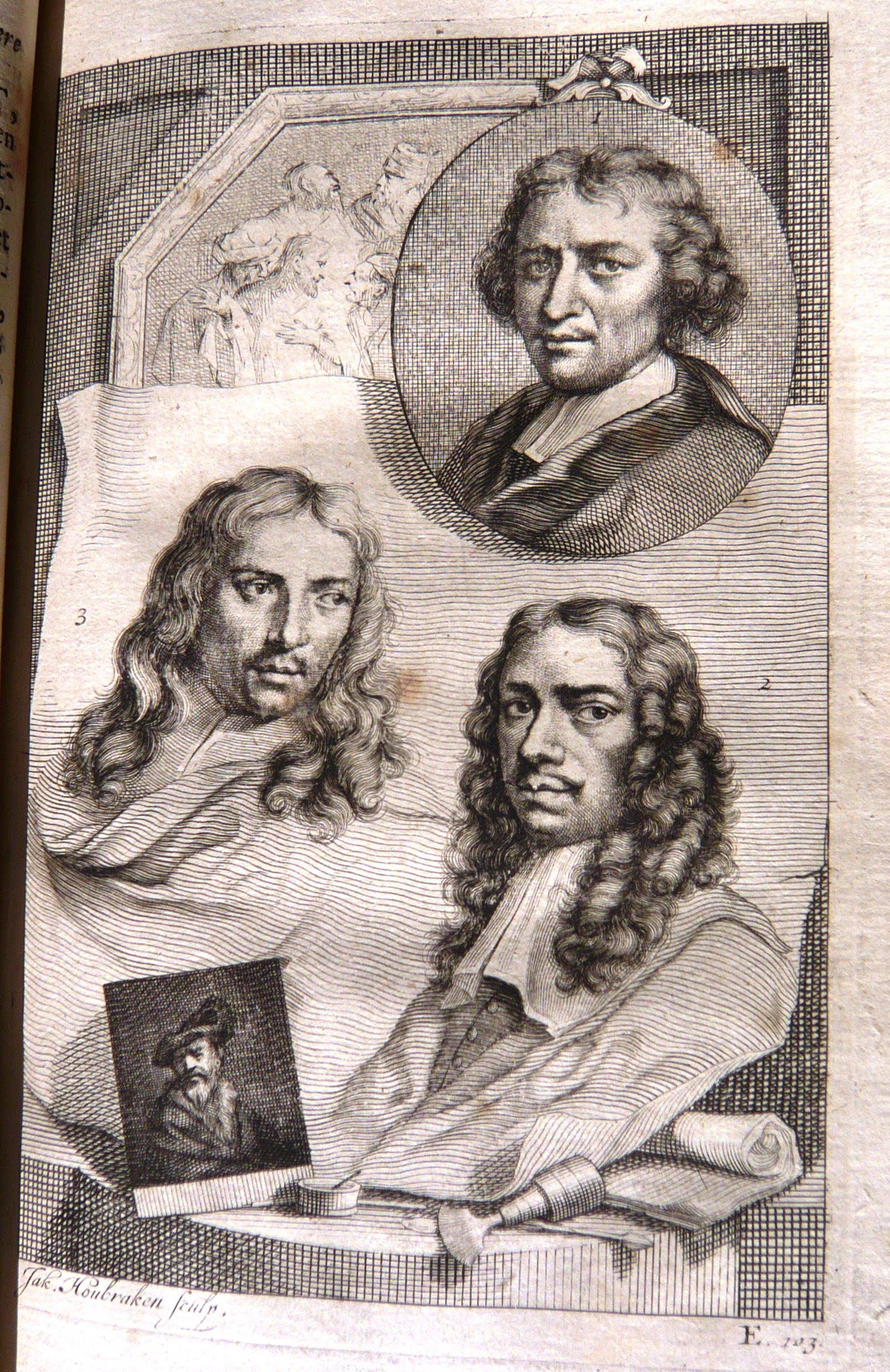
Jacques Vaillant portrait shown in lower left next to his brother Wallerant Vaillant under a portrait of their Amsterdam contemporary, Gerbrand van den Eeckhout, in Arnold Houbraken's Schouburg, Volume II, 1719.

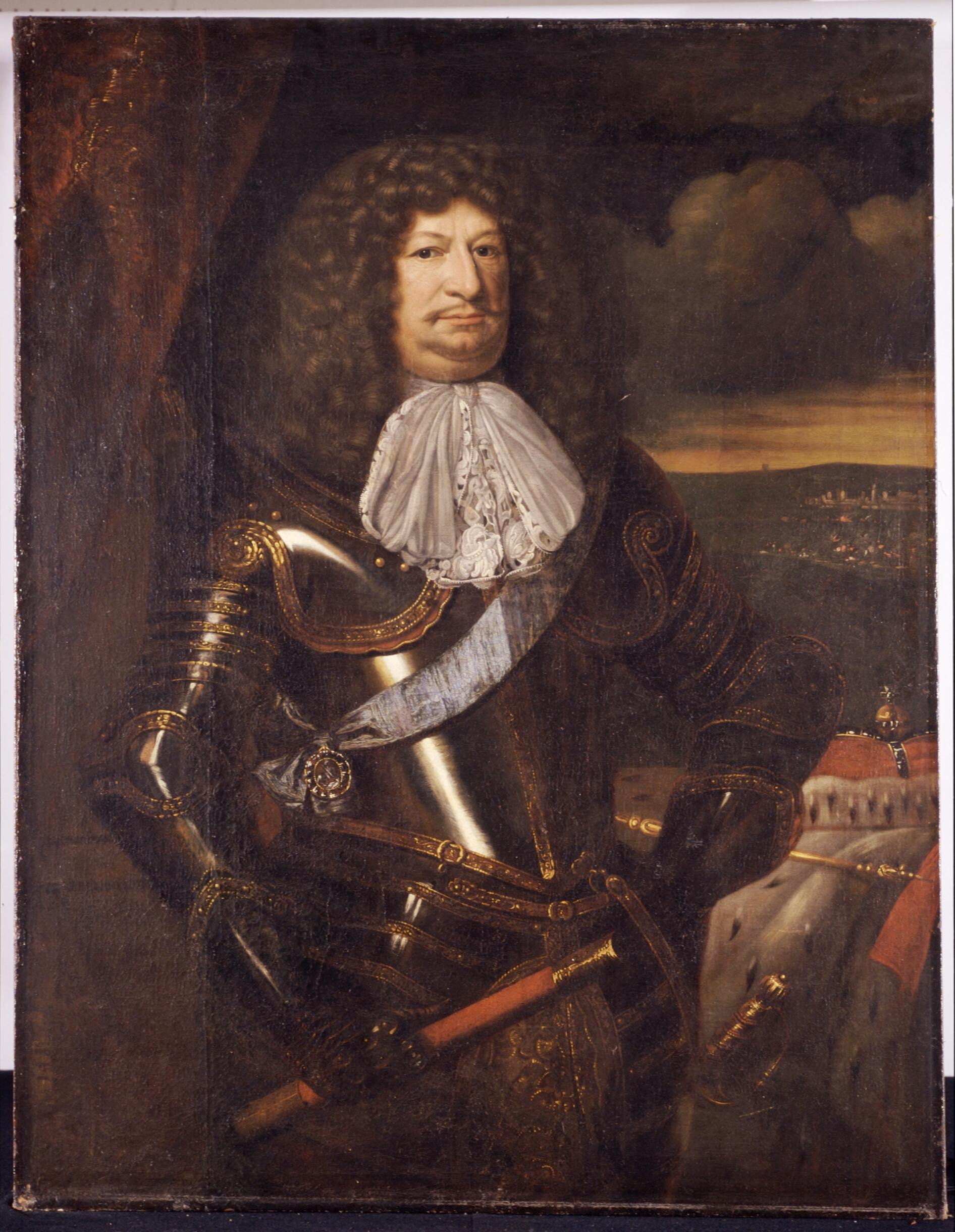
Friedrich Wilhelm I of Brandenburg with the Battle of Fehrbellin.

Jacques Vaillant (1643 in Amsterdam – 1691 in Berlin), was a Dutch Golden Age painter.

According to Houbraken he learned to paint from his older brother Wallerant Vaillant. He travelled to Rome and joined the Bentvueghels with the nickname Leeurik. He became court painter for Friedrich Wilhelm I of Brandenburg after his envoy invited him to Berlin. The Great Elector was so pleased with his work that he sent him to the Emperor Leopold I to paint his portrait. When Vaillant returned from this trip to Berlin, he died soon after.

According to the RKD he was in Rome from 1664 to 1666, in Amsterdam from 1666 to 1670, and then moved to The Hague for two years where he became a member of the Confrerie Pictura from 1670 to 1672, and in 1672 he moved to Berlin. Simon Ruys was his pupil.
