= Carel Borchaert Voet =

Dutch painter

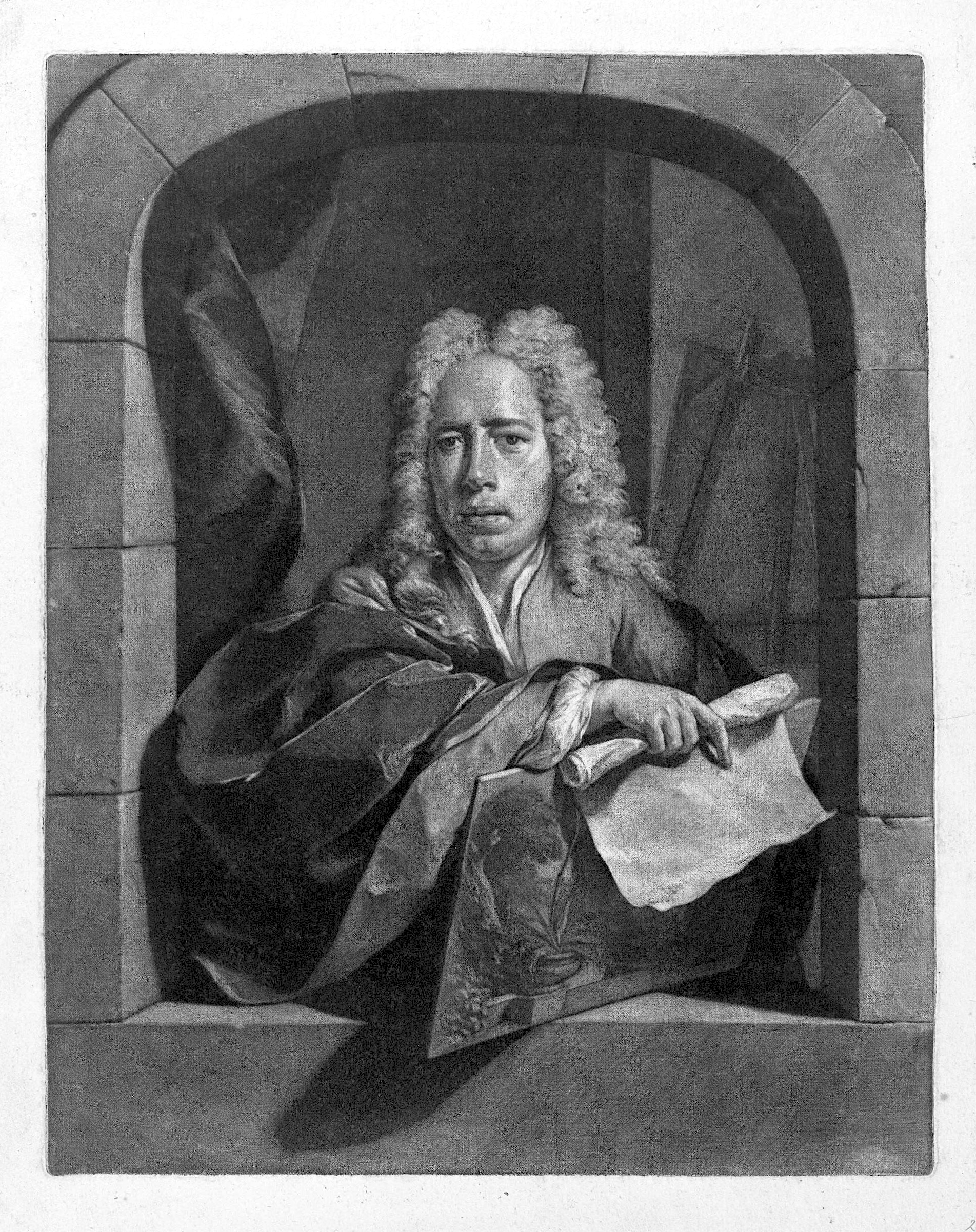
Carel Borchaert Voet (Nicolaas Verkolje)

Carel Borchaert Voet (1671–1743) was an 18th-century flower and insect painter from the Dutch Republic.

== Biography ==
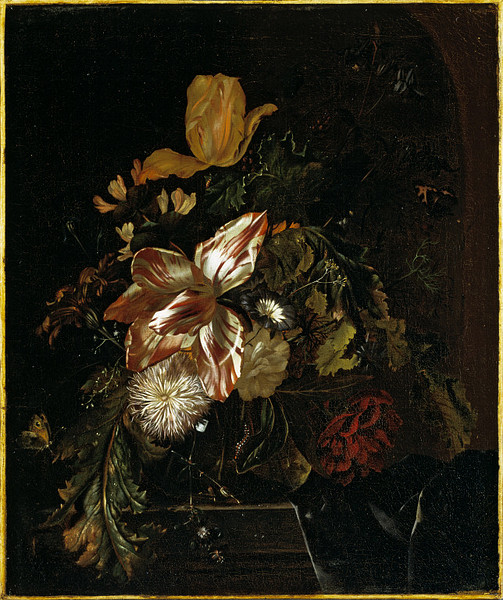
Flowers on a stone ledge

He was born in Zwolle. According to the RKD he became a member of the Confrerie Pictura in the years 1692–1699. He travelled to England in the service of Hans Willem Bentinck, count of Portland. He contributed to his Codex Bentingiana, a catalog of the flowers and insects in his garden called Bentingiana, that was later used as a source for Leonard Plukenet's Phytographia in 1692. He moved to Dordrecht in 1702 where he stayed util his death in 1743.
