= Dirk Meerkerk =

Dutch painter

Dirk Meerkerk (1620 in Gouda – 1660 in Gouda), was a Dutch Golden Age painter.

According to Houbraken he was born in the former brewery "Van den Passer" in the Keizerstraat, and travelled to Rome. He lived in Rome with the Bishop of Nantes, Gabriel de Beauvau Rivau, and returned to Gouda only to drown soon after when he fell into a canal on the way back from a funeral. He was mentioned in Ignatius Walvis "Beschrijvinge van Gouda" as an able painter who travelled to Rome "by his art", meaning he paid his way with his talents.

No known works survive.
