= Scheffers =

Scheffers is a Dutch surname. Notable people with this surname include:

- Georg Scheffers (1899–1945), German mathematician
- Maikel Scheffers (born 1982), Dutch wheelchair tennis player
- Victor Scheffers (born 1960), Dutch rower
