= Gerard Edema =

Dutch painter

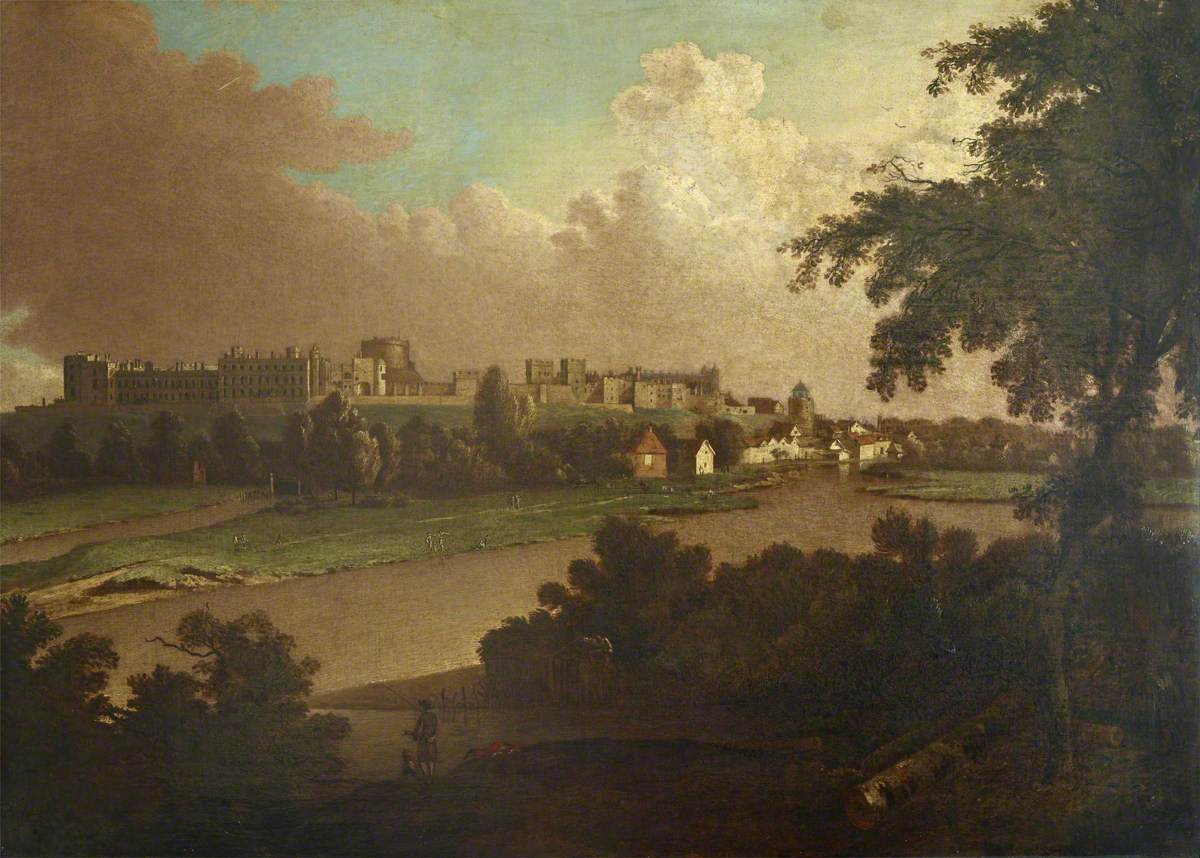
View of Windsor from the River by Gerard van Edema

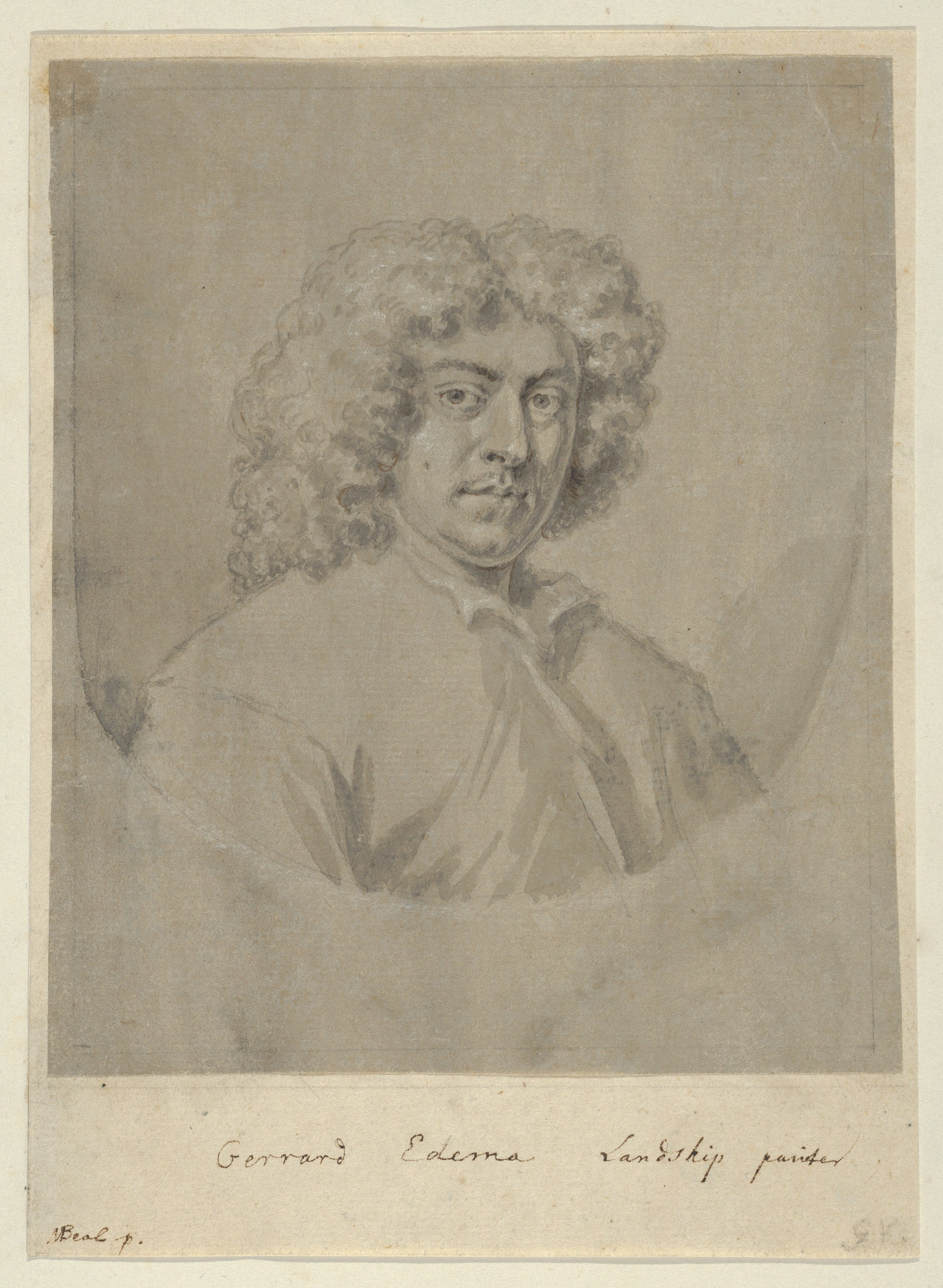
Gerard Edema, ca. 1680, attributed to Mary Beale, Metropolitan Museum of Art

Gerard Edema or Gerard van Edema (c. 1652, Amsterdam – c. 1700, Richmond, Surrey), was a Dutch landscape-painter who settled in England.

== Biography ==
Edema is stated to have been a native of Friesland. He was a pupil of Allart van Everdingen, from whom he learnt to paint landscapes of a wild and savage nature, with a predilection for rocks and waterfalls. He came to England about 1670, in his eighteenth year, and shortly afterwards made an expedition to Norway to collect subjects for his pictures.

These travels he extended to Surinam in Dutch Guiana, the West Indies, the English colonies in America, and Newfoundland. He returned to London with a great number of paintings representing the novel and unknown scenery which he had visited, and their strange and awe-inspiring character earned him the name of ‘the Salvator Rosa of the North.’ He had no difficulty in disposing of any number of them to the merchants whose business was connected with those countries, and his landscapes were eagerly sought after by the nobility. Edema, having no talent for figures and buildings, was usually assisted in this line by Jan Wyck.

Sir Richard Edgcumbe, being anxious to have a series of views of Mount-Edgcumbe painted for his house there, employed Edema, Wyck, and Vandevelde to execute them in concert. They remained some time at Mount-Edgcumbe, and produced several views which still exist. Unfortunately for Edema his prosperity led him into luxurious habits and to an inordinate love of the bottle, which caused his death at Richmond about 1700. Two landscapes by him are at Hampton Court. He was a clever painter, but owed his success to the novelty and interest of his subjects. Some authorities distinguish him from a Nicholas Edema, living at the same time, who visited Surinam for the purpose of painting insects and plants, a line of art which he abandoned for landscape-painting. It seems almost certain that there was only one painter of the name.
