= Nicolaes Willingh =

Dutch Golden Age painter

Nicolaes Willingh (1640, The Hague – 1678, Berlin), was a Dutch Golden Age painter.

== Biography ==
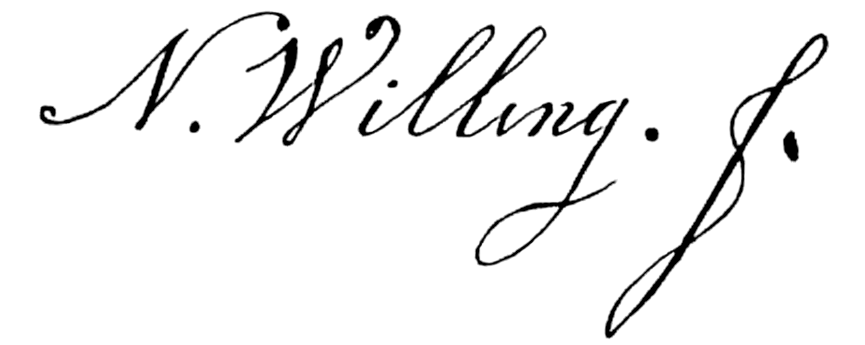
Signature of Nicolaes Willingh

According to Houbraken he was the teacher of Robbert Duval and Augustinus Terwesten. According to Jan van Gool, who was curious about Houbraken's "teacher of Robbert Duval and Augustinus Terwesten", he was born in the Hague and made a name for himself working for the "Grave van Hoorn" (Count of Hoorn). He died in Berlin in 1678.

According to the RKD he was the brother-in-law of Anthony de Haen, father of Pieter Willingh, and member of the Confrerie Pictura in the Hague. He became court painter to Frederick William, Elector of Brandenburg in 1667, and his pupils were Robbert Duval, Louis Michiel, and Augustinus Terwesten I. He is known for landscapes and historical allegories.

== Gallery ==
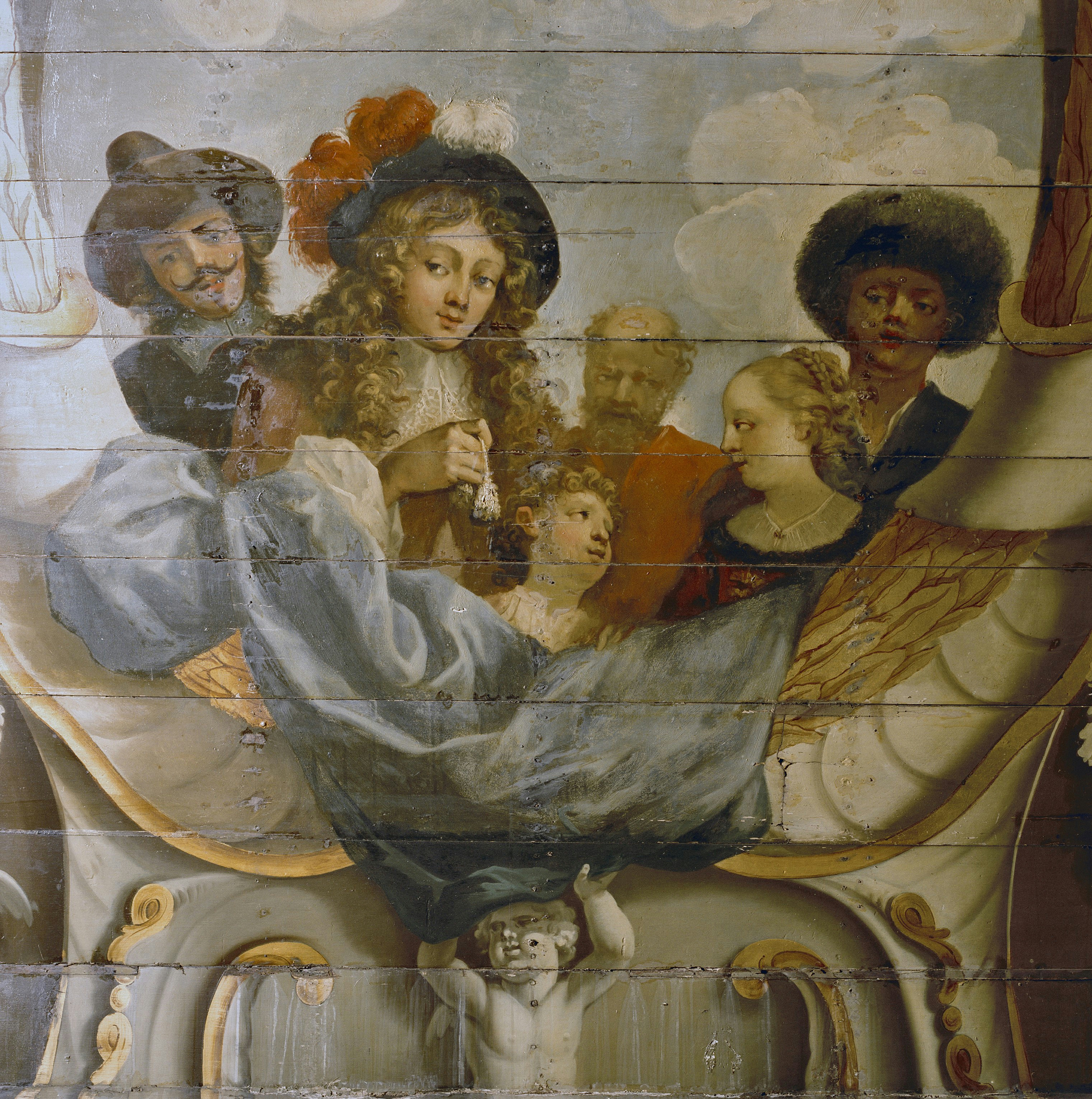

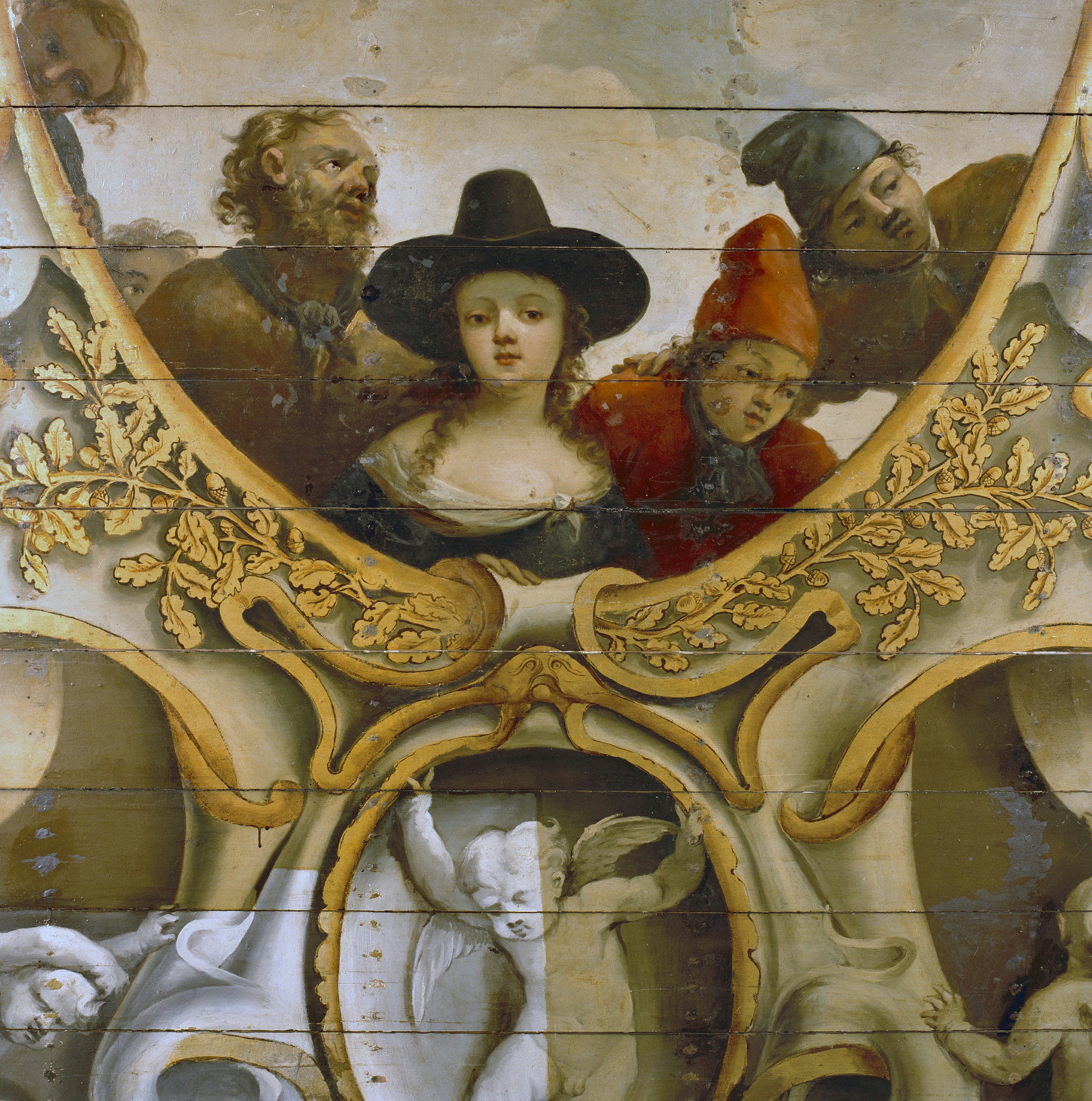

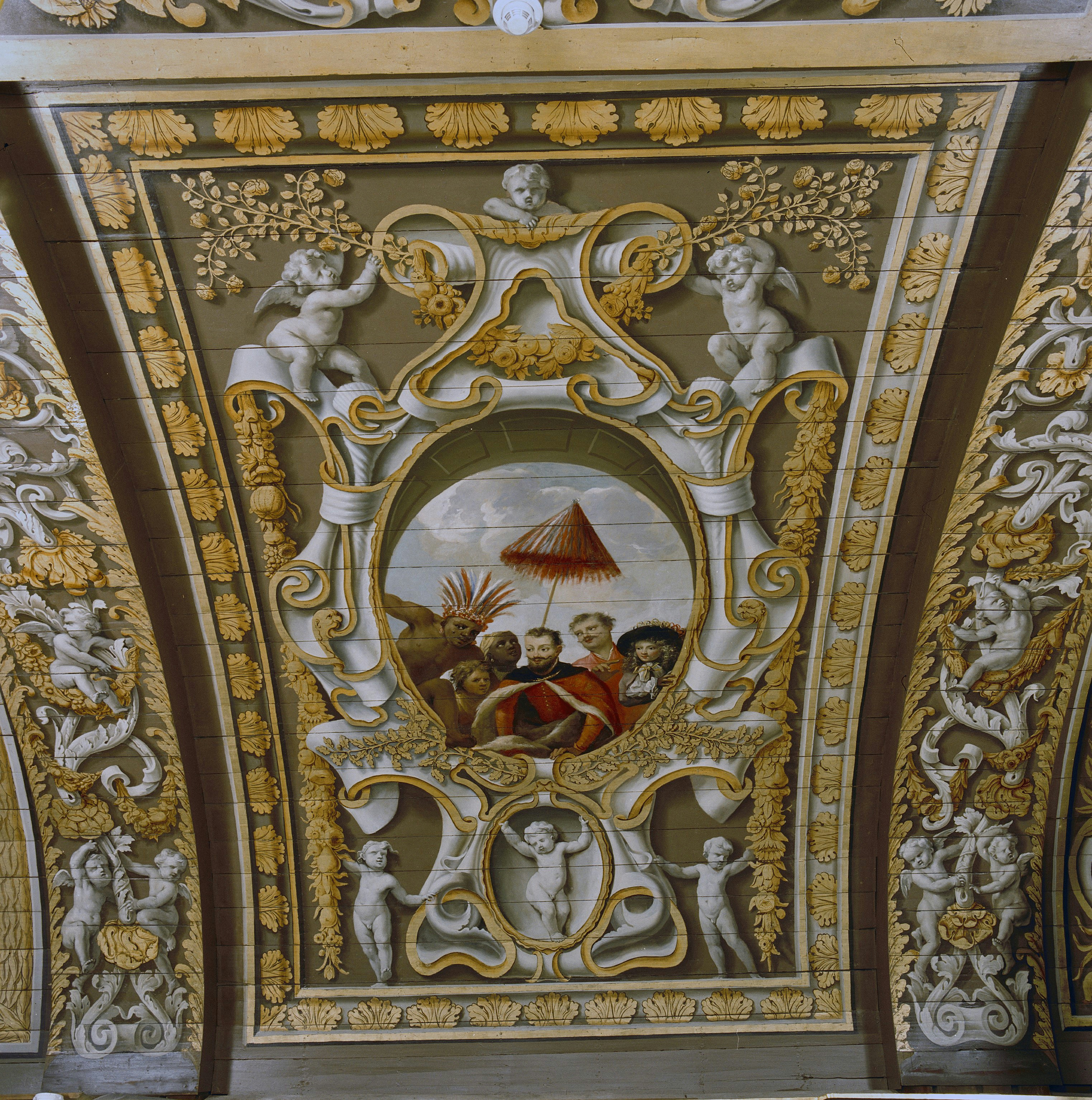

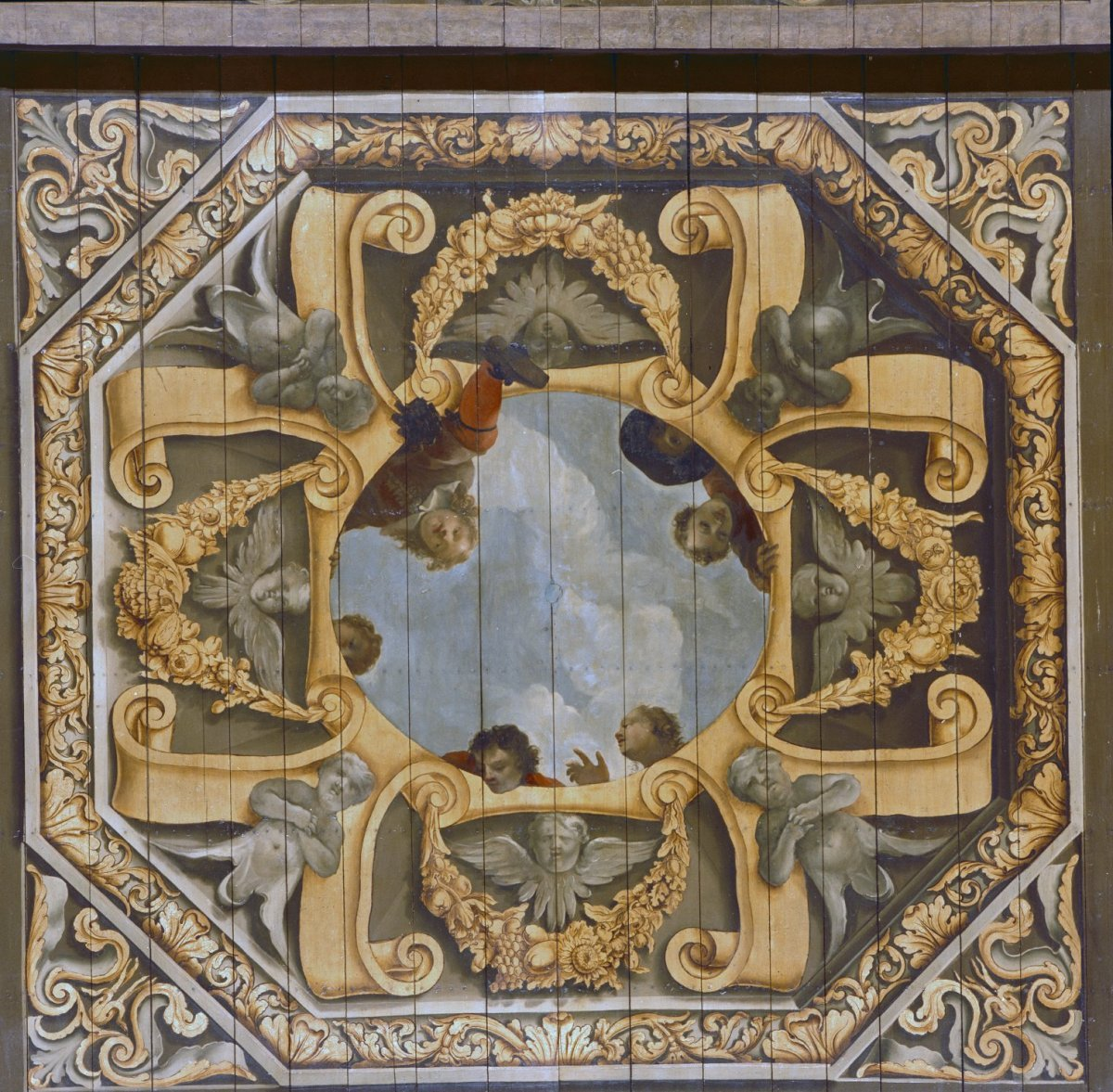
