= Jan van der Lijs =

Dutch Golden Age landscape painter

Jan van der Lijs (1600 in Breda – 1657 in Rotterdam), was a Dutch Golden Age landscape painter.

== Biography ==
According to Houbraken he was the best pupil of Cornelis van Poelenburch, whose works were often confused with those of his master.

According to the RKD he is known as a pupil of Cornelis van Poelenburch whose only known work today is a drawing in the manner of Jan Both in the collection of the Noordbrabants Museum.
