= Reinier Boitet =

Dutch publisher and writer

Reinier Boitet (19 January 1691 in Delft – 5 January 1758 in Delft), was a Dutch publisher and writer who updated Dirk van Bleiswijk's History of Delft in 1729.

== Biography ==
Boitet was the son of Simon Boitet, baker, and Aeltje van der Wel. In April 1717 he married Maria van Hulst and in 1718 he requested permission to start printing a newspaper. This permission was granted in 1721, after which he established his printshop on the Wijnhaven. His newspaper, in 1732 named Hollantsche Historische Courant, remained in press until 1775. According to the RKD he collaborated with Gerard onder de Linden on several prints.

He was a bookseller in Delft who also made poems, but his greatest work was his update to Bleiswijk's "Description of the city of Delft" (Dutch: Beschryvinge der stad Delft), originally published in 1667. His assistants were H. Heussen and H. van Rijn, possibly also the poet Hubert Kornelisz Poot and R. Ouwens.

== Works ==
- 1724 Poems by Joachim Oudaan, published by Joachim Fransz Oudaan, Hubert Korneliszoon Poot, Reinier Boitet
- 1729 History of Delft

== Painter biographies ==
Reinier Boitet merged Bleiswijk's biographical information with Karel van Mander and Arnold Houbraken's commentary on Delft painters. Van Mander wrote entries for Erasmus, Anthonis van Montfoort, Pieter Kornelisz. van Ryk, Michiel Jansz Mierevelt and his pupils (Pauwels Moreelsz. woonende t'Wtrecht, Pieter Geeritsz. Montfort, Pieter Dircksen Cluyt, Claes Cornelisz. van Delft), J. Jordaens, and Jaques de Moschero. Houbraken included all of these and wrote additional entries for Kristiaen van Kouwenberch (mentioning his works at wall decorations at Huis ter Nieuwburg, Huis ten Bosch), Leonard Bramer (whose engraved portrait he included), Pieter van Asch (whose entry he wrote based on information from Jan Verkolje), Adriaan van Linschoten (whose entry he wrote based on information from Pieter Ruiven), Hans Jordaans (of whom he had not much to tell beyond his Italy trip, but that Houbraken had been told that he was the father of Lucas Jordaens according to Jan van Beuningen), Kornelis de Man (of whom he claimed he spent 9 years abroad in France and Italy and on his return never married, but made a large group portrait for the anatomists in Delft and several small "gezelschapjes van Heeren en Juffrouwen", or "conversation pieces with ladies and gentlemen" that could still be seen there in his day), Johannes Vermeer (whose name he transcribed from Bleiswijk without any further mention at all), and Pieter de Hooge (of whom he claimed he made "Kamergezigten", or "room-views" with "gezelschapjes van Heeren en Juffrouwen" and had been a pupil of N. Berchem at the same time as Jakob Ugtervelt). Boitet seems to have ignored the entries he could not confirm, most notably omitting Vermeer and De Hooch. The biographies Boitet included were:

- David Joris, (1501-1556)
- Augustyn Verburgh, (1525-1552)
- Willem Danielsz van Tetrode, (1505-1588)
- Anthonie van Montfoort, (1533-1583)
- Jan Gerritsz van Bronckhorst, (1603-1661)
- Christiaen Jansz van Bieselingen, (1558-1600)
- Aper Fransz van der Houve, (1569-1625)
- Jacob Delff, (1550-1601)
- Pieter Cornelisz van Rijck, (1567-1637)
- Palamedes Palamedesz. (I), (1607-1638)
- Jacob Vosmaer, (1574-1641)
- Michiel Jansz. van Mierevelt, (1567-1641)
- Willem van der Vliet, (1584-1642)
- Johan van Nes, (1620-d1650)
- Cornelis Willemsz van Kittenstein, (1598-1652)
- Carel Fabritius, (1622-1654)
- David Beck, (1621-1655)
- Pieter van Bronckhorst, (1588-1661)
- Adriaen van de Venne, (1589-1662)
- Huybrecht Jacobsz Grimani, (1599-1651)
- Evert van Aelst, (1602-1656)
- Willem van Aelst, (1627-1683)
- Jacob Willemsz Delff, (1580-1638)
- Christiaen van Couwenbergh, (1604-1667)
- Hans Jordaens, (1555-1630)
- Cornelis de Man, (1621-1706)
- Pieter Jansz van Asch, (1603-1678)
- Adriaen Cornelisz van Linschoten, (1607-1677)
- Gysbert Andriesz Verbrugge, (1633-1730)
- Jan Verkolje, (1650-1693)
- Pieter Jansz van Ruyven, (1651-1719)
- Thomas van der Wilt, (1659-1733)
- Joan van der Spriet, (1627-1671)
- Albertus van der Burch, (1650-1712)
