= Vosmaer =

Vosmaer is a surname. Notable people with the surname include:

- Arnout Vosmaer (1720–1799), Dutch naturalist
- Bobby Vosmaer (b. 1951), Dutch former footballer
- Carel Vosmaer (1826–1888), Dutch poet and art-critic
- Daniel Vosmaer (c. 1630–after 1666), Dutch Golden Age painter
- Gualtherus Carel Jacob Vosmaer (1854–1916), Dutch zoologist
- Jacob Vosmaer (1574–1641), Dutch Golden Age painter
- Liesbeth Vosmaer-de Bruin (born 1946), Dutch retired rower
