= Beniamino Facchinelli =

Italian photographer (1839–1895)

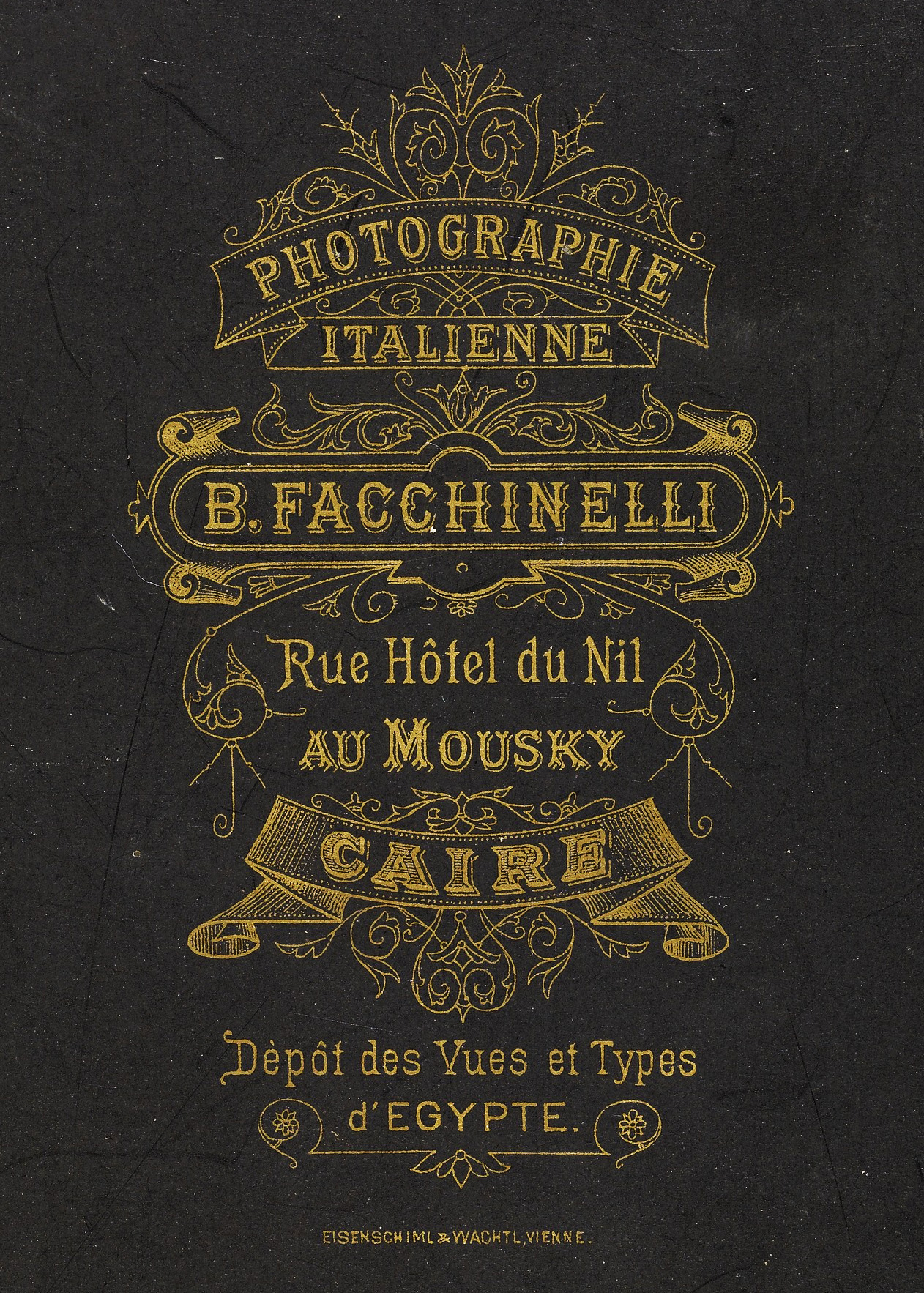
- cabinet card verso
- Born: 8 July 1839
- Died: 29 November 1895 (aged 56)
- Occupation: Photographer

Beniamino Facchinelli (8 July 1839 – 29 November 1895) was an Italian photographer working in Cairo, Egypt during the late 19th century. Most of his known work is housed in the Bibliothèque nationale de France and has been recently digitized.

== Gallery ==
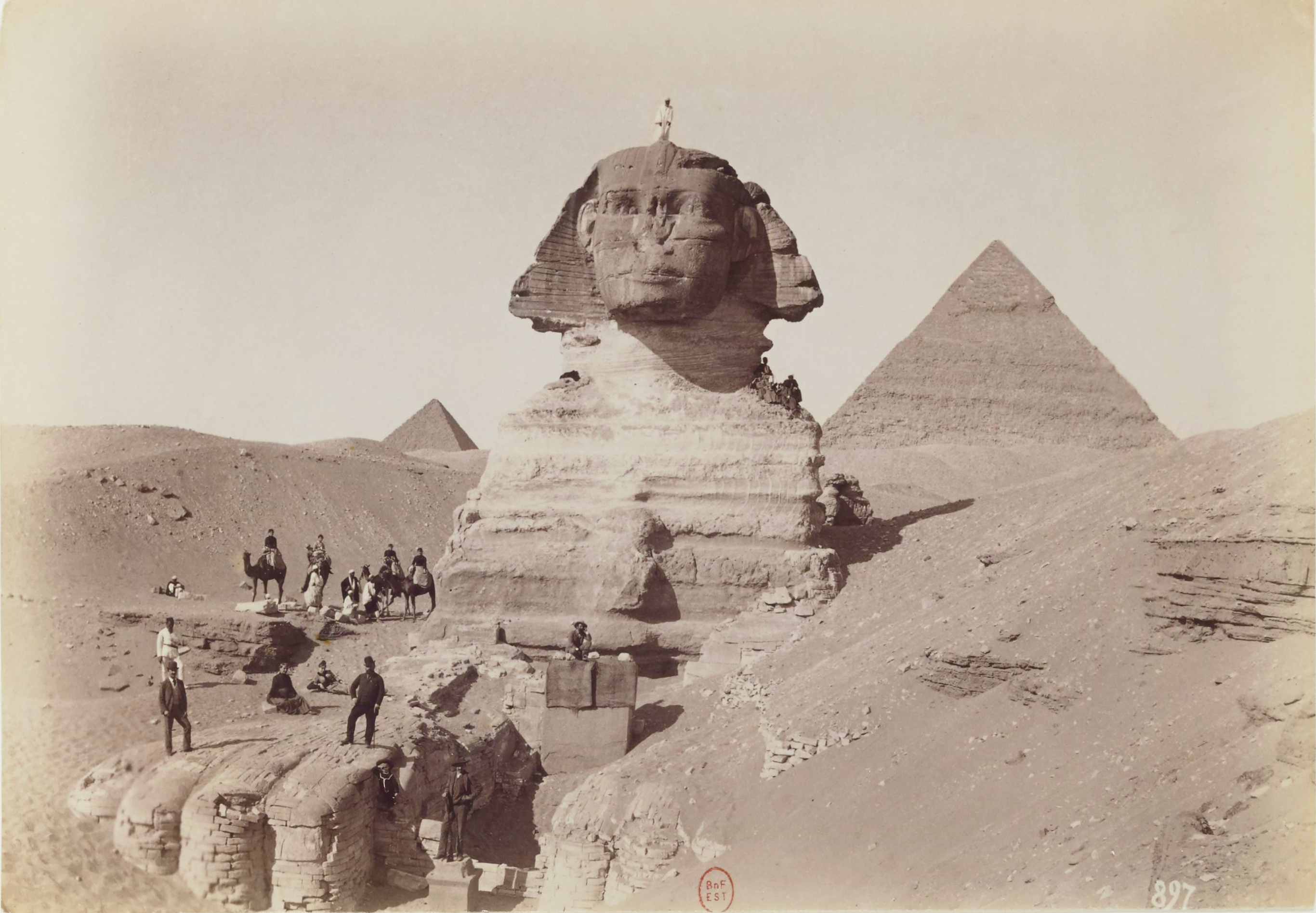
Great Sphinx of Giza

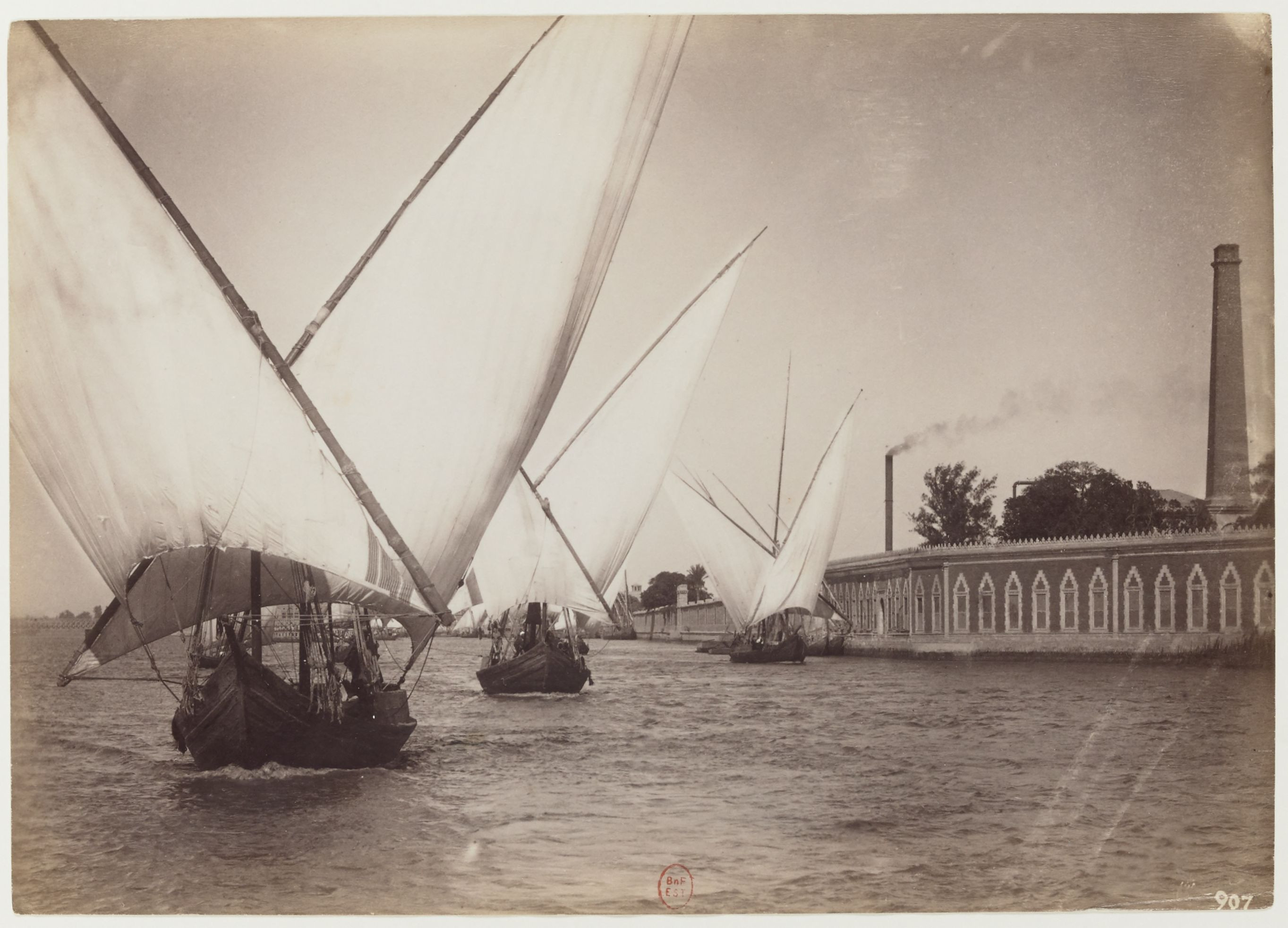
Feluccas on the Nile

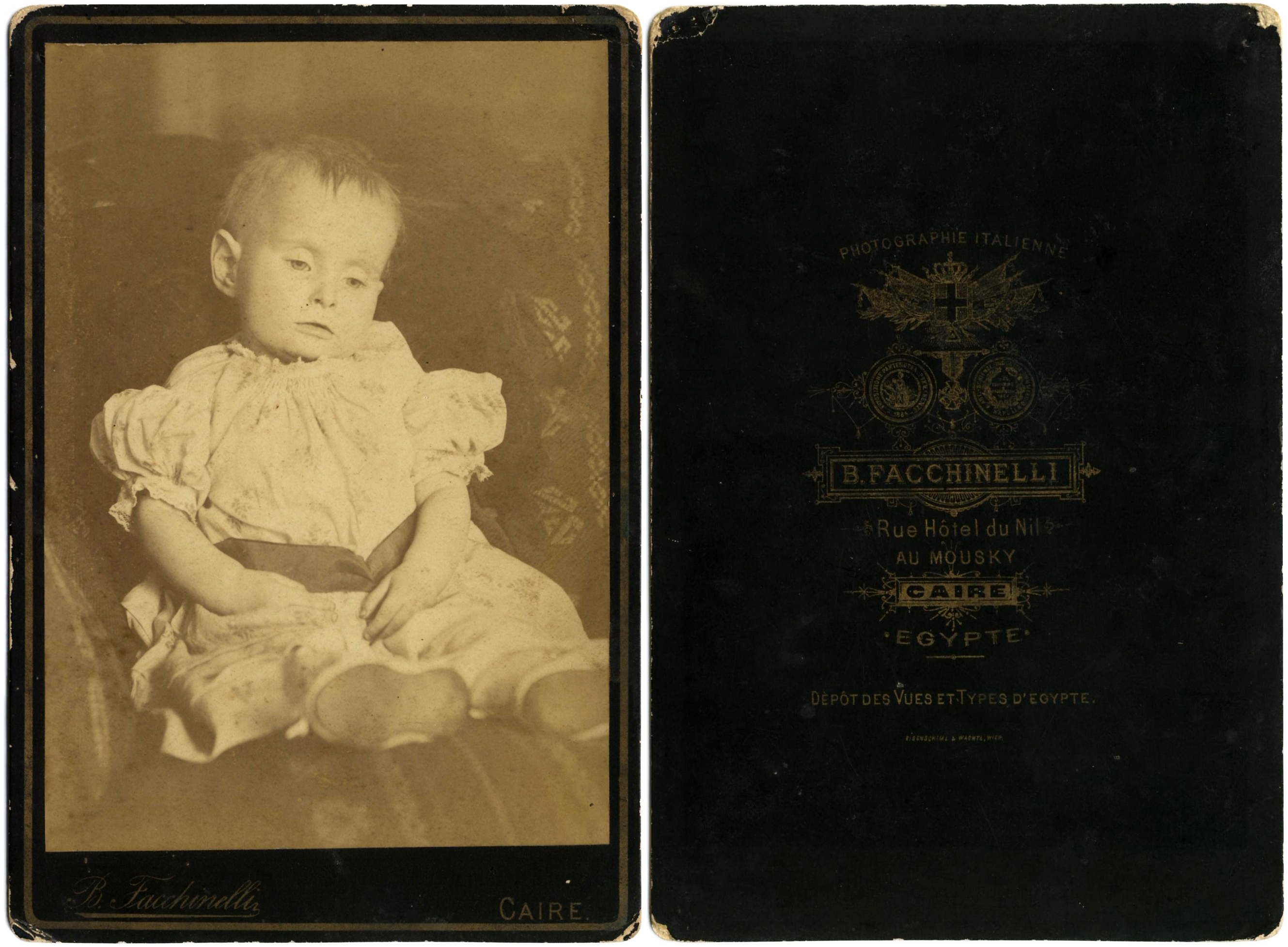
Post-mortem infant

== Bibliography ==
Ola Seif, "Topographical Photography in Cairo : The Lens of Beniamino Facchinelli" in Mercedes Volait (dir.), Le Caire.Dessiné et photographié au XIXe siècle, Paris : Picard CNRS, 2013 (D'une rive l'autre), p. 195-214
