= Dirk van Bleiswijk =

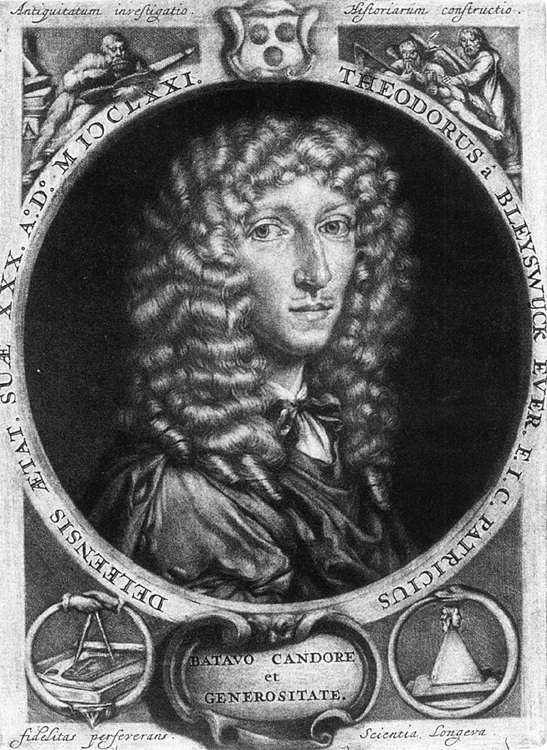
Print by Jan Verkolje of Dirck Evertsz van Bleyswijck at the age of thirty, from his book in 1671.

Dirk van Bleiswijk, or Dirck van Bleyswijck (28 December 1639 in Delft – 11 September 1681 in Middelburg), was a Delft politician and writer.

== Biography ==
In 1671, he became councilman or "veertigraad" in Delft, in 1672 magistrate, and in 1675 mayor. In 1681, he became a councilman in the admiralty of Zeeland. He is known for his "Description of the city of Delft" (Dutch: Beschryvinge der stad Delft), published in 1667. He was sickly and remained unmarried. The index and plates by Coenraet Decker of important buildings for the publication were published separately in 1668 and 1675 along with a map of Delft by Johannes de Ram.

According to Houbraken who used him several times as a source (most notably for his first entry on Erasmus), the Dordrecht minister David Flud van Giffen had a portrait of Balthasar Gerards, the murderer of Willem the Silent, as a curiosity in his cabinet. The painting was made from life by Christiaen Jansz van Bieselingen, who also was known for drawing the dead prince, and it was copied by Hendrik Gerritsz Pot for his large commemorative painting in the Delft city hall.

== Legacy ==
Bleiswijk's work is an important archive for the city of Delft. He touches on a number of different aspects of city life, including its painters, though scholars have failed to find traces of commentary on Johannes Vermeer. The Delft writer Reinier Boitet published an update of Bleiswijk's work in 1729, and reused Deckers plates, De Ram's map, and merged biographical information van Karel van Mander and Arnold Houbraken's commentary on Delft painters.
