= Mourning portraits =

Portrait of a person who has recently died

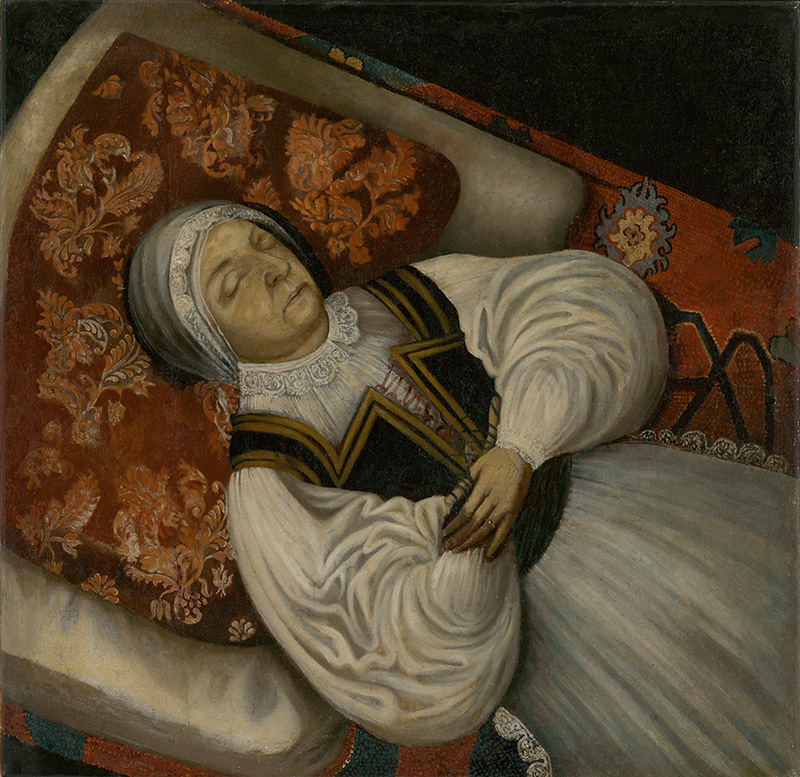
Mourning portrait of K. Horvath-Stansith, née Kiss, artist unknown, 1680s

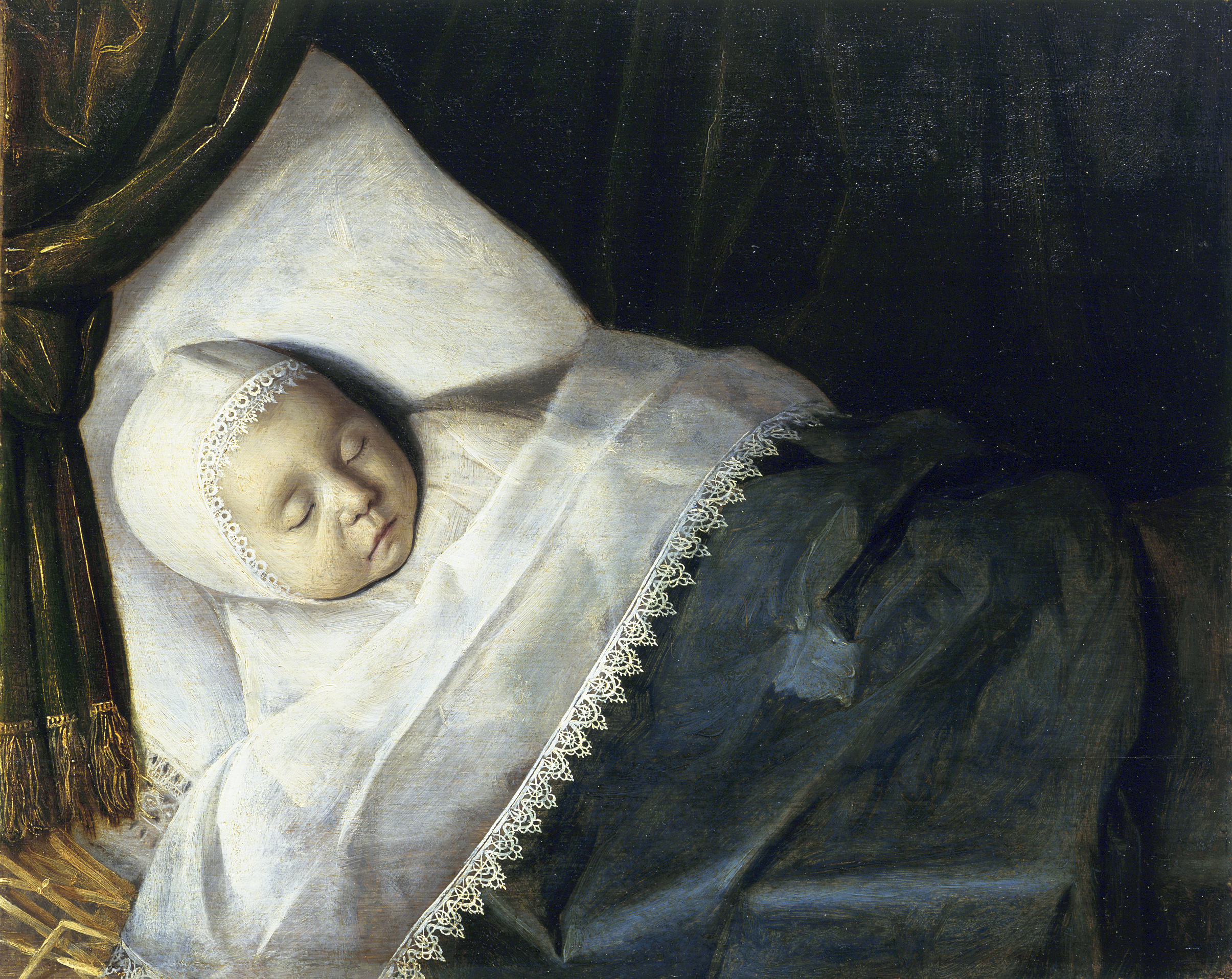
A Child of the Honigh Family on its Deathbed, by an unknown painter, 1675-1700

A mourning portrait or deathbed portrait is a portrait of a person who has recently died, usually shown on their deathbed, or lying in repose, displayed for mourners. These were not rare in European homes of well-to-do people as a way of remembering and honoring the dead. People were generally laid out in their best clothes with some sort of special headdress, and some sort of token in their hands. Today these portraits give insights into old funeral customs, but also various types of information regarding folk costumes. In the 19th century post-mortem photography continued the tradition.

Recent research on deathbed portraits, which can be found also in prints and photographs up to today, shows that they became popular after the Protestant Reformation but were never treasured as family heirlooms in the same way as other artworks and thus relatively few early examples such as this one have survived. As a continuous art form, laying out traditions did not go away and photography has continued to preserve the deathbed portrait, though such photos were meant for mourners and did not find their way into photo albums.

In the Netherlands, complicated wreaths of greens were placed around the heads of unmarried people, who were mostly children. In Dutch such a wreath is called a "hoedje" (little hat) and this is part of the general body decoration called "pelen". The word "pelen" is related to the English word "pall", as in "pallbearer", which in funeral contexts refers to the cloth (sometimes a flag) over the body or casket.

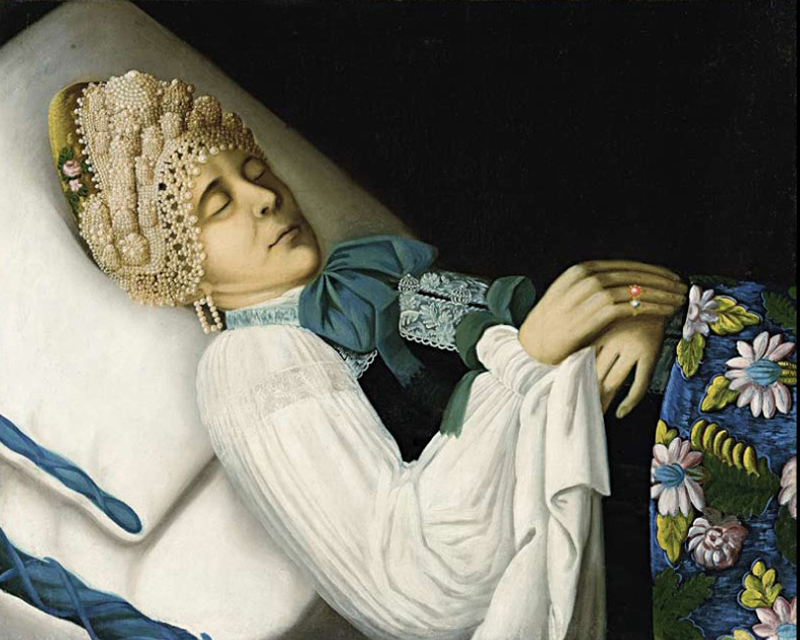
Deathbed portrait of Toropets, by anonymous 19th-century Russian painter

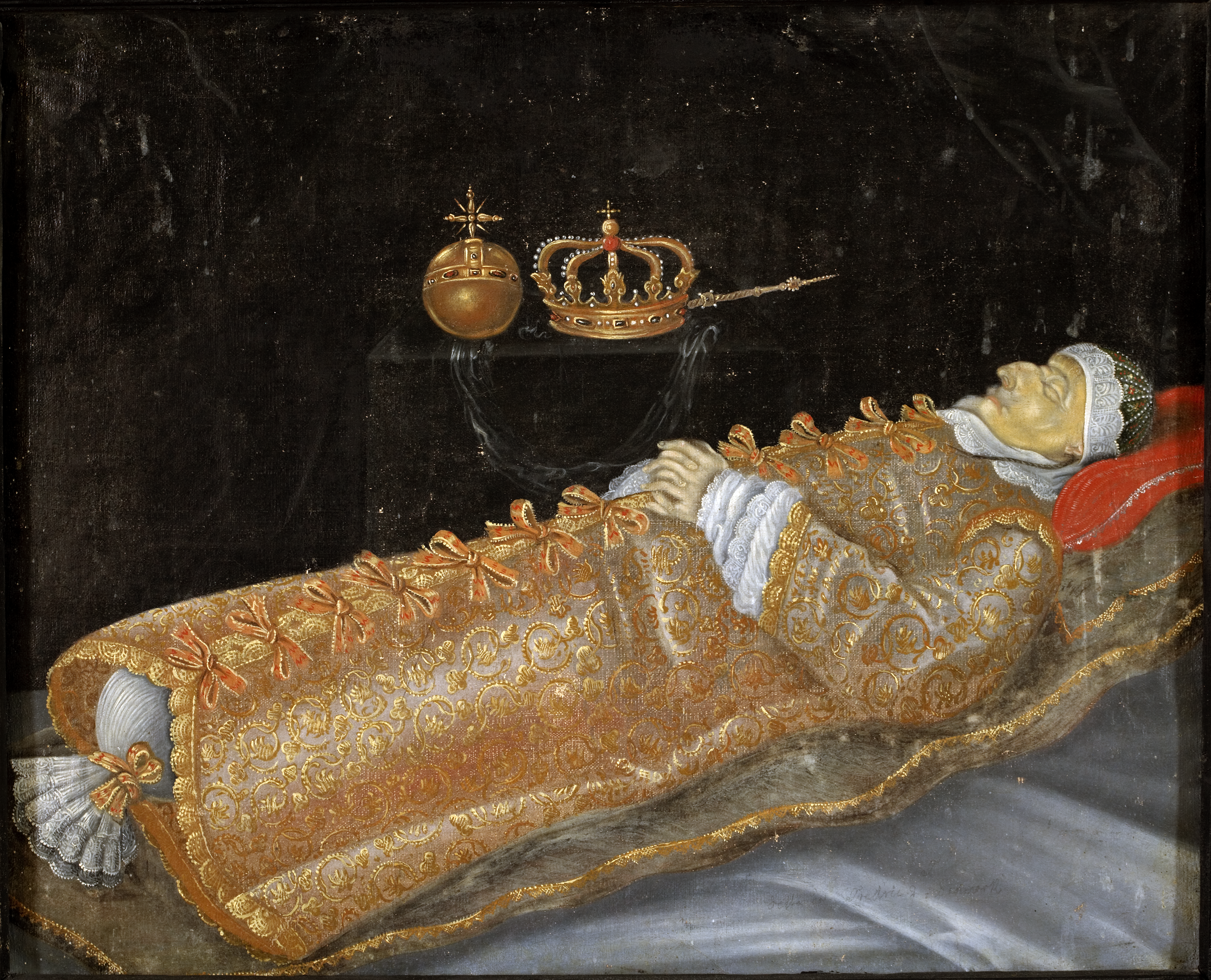
Deathbed portrait of Christian IV, King of Denmark, by Berent Hilwaetz, 1650

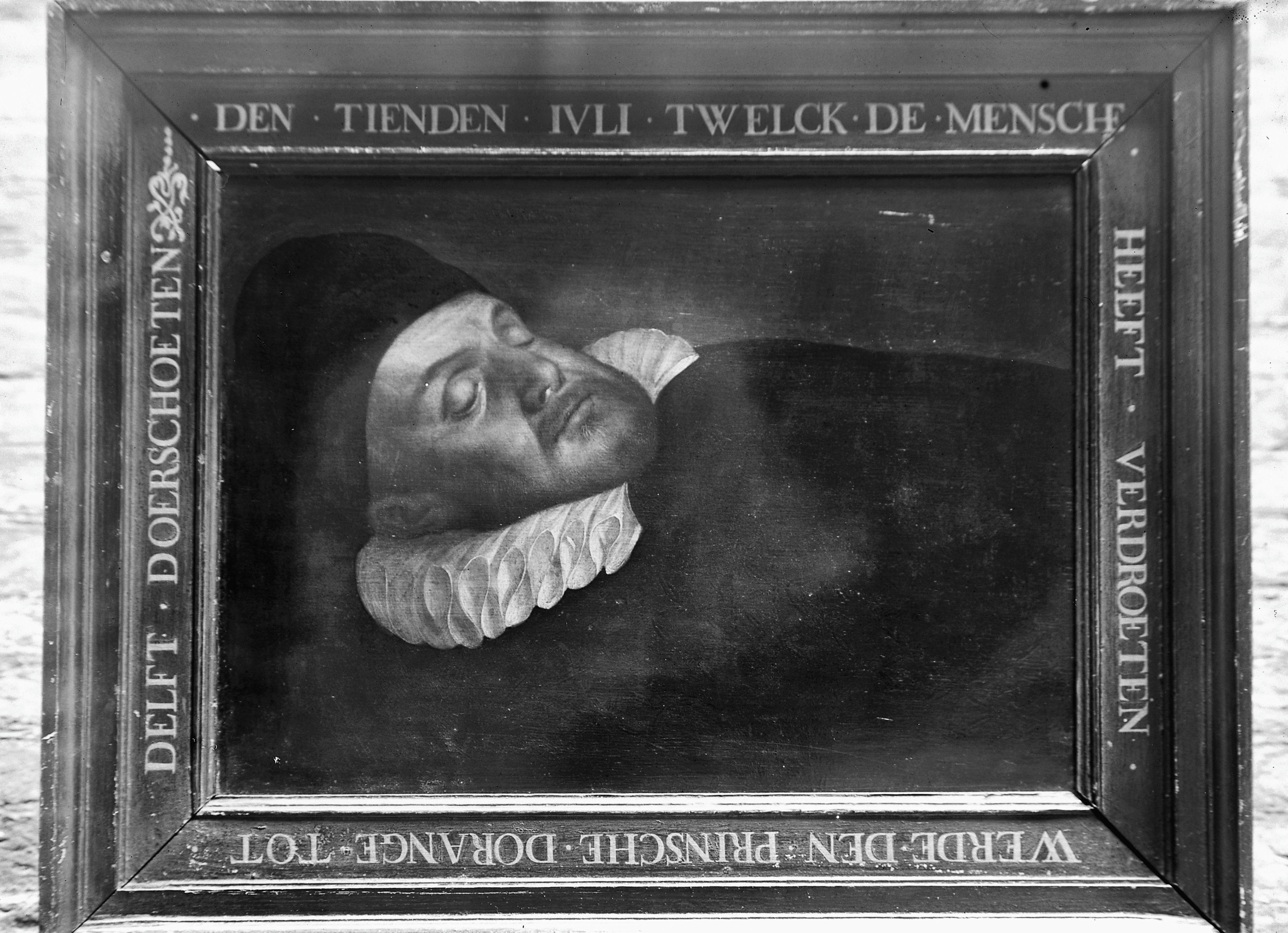
Deathbed portrait of William the Silent, by Christiaen Jansz van Bieselingen, 1584

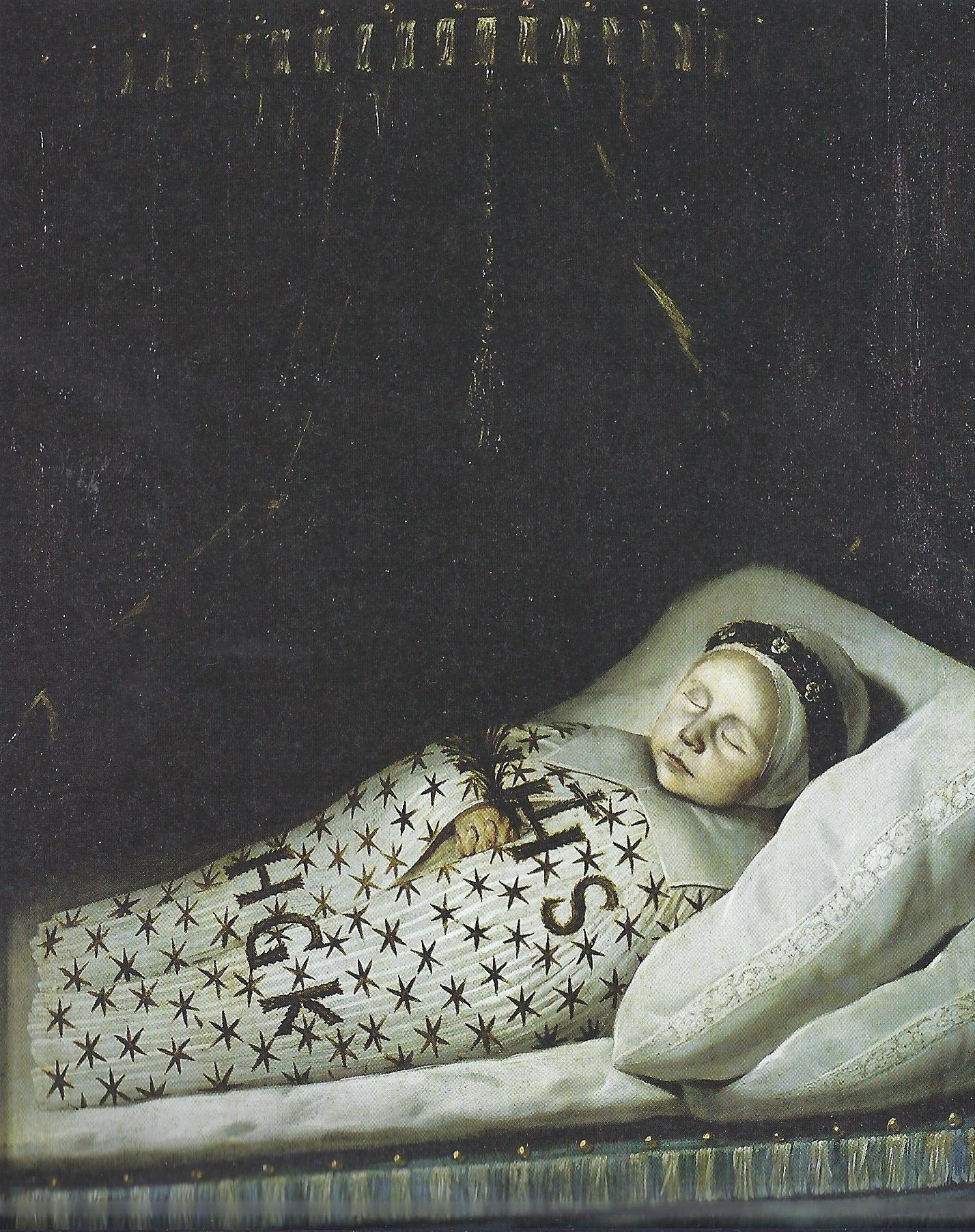
Portrait of a dead child wearing a mourning wreath around its head, by Jan Jansz. de Stomme, 1654

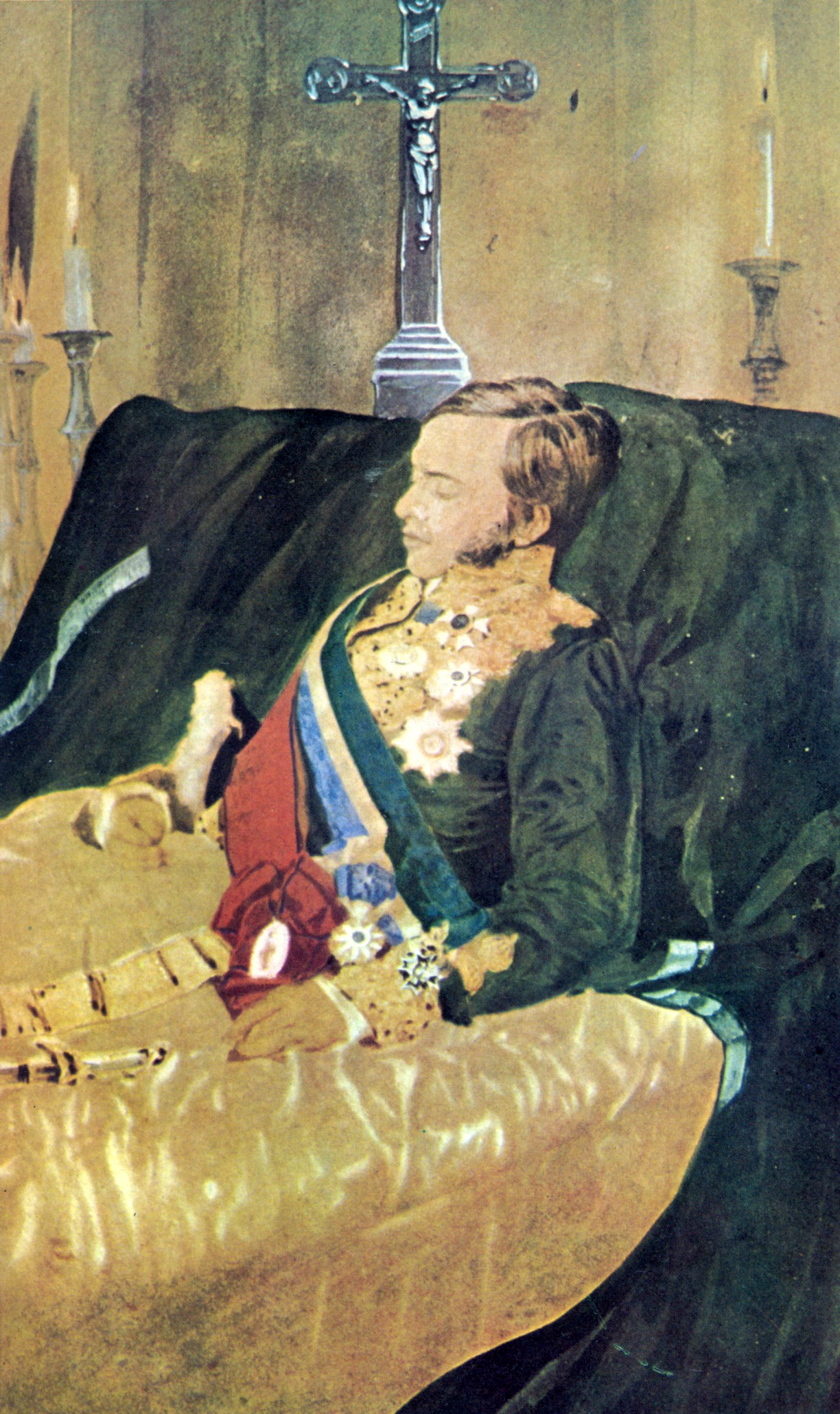
The Marquis of Paraná, Prime Minister of Brazil on his deathbed, 1856

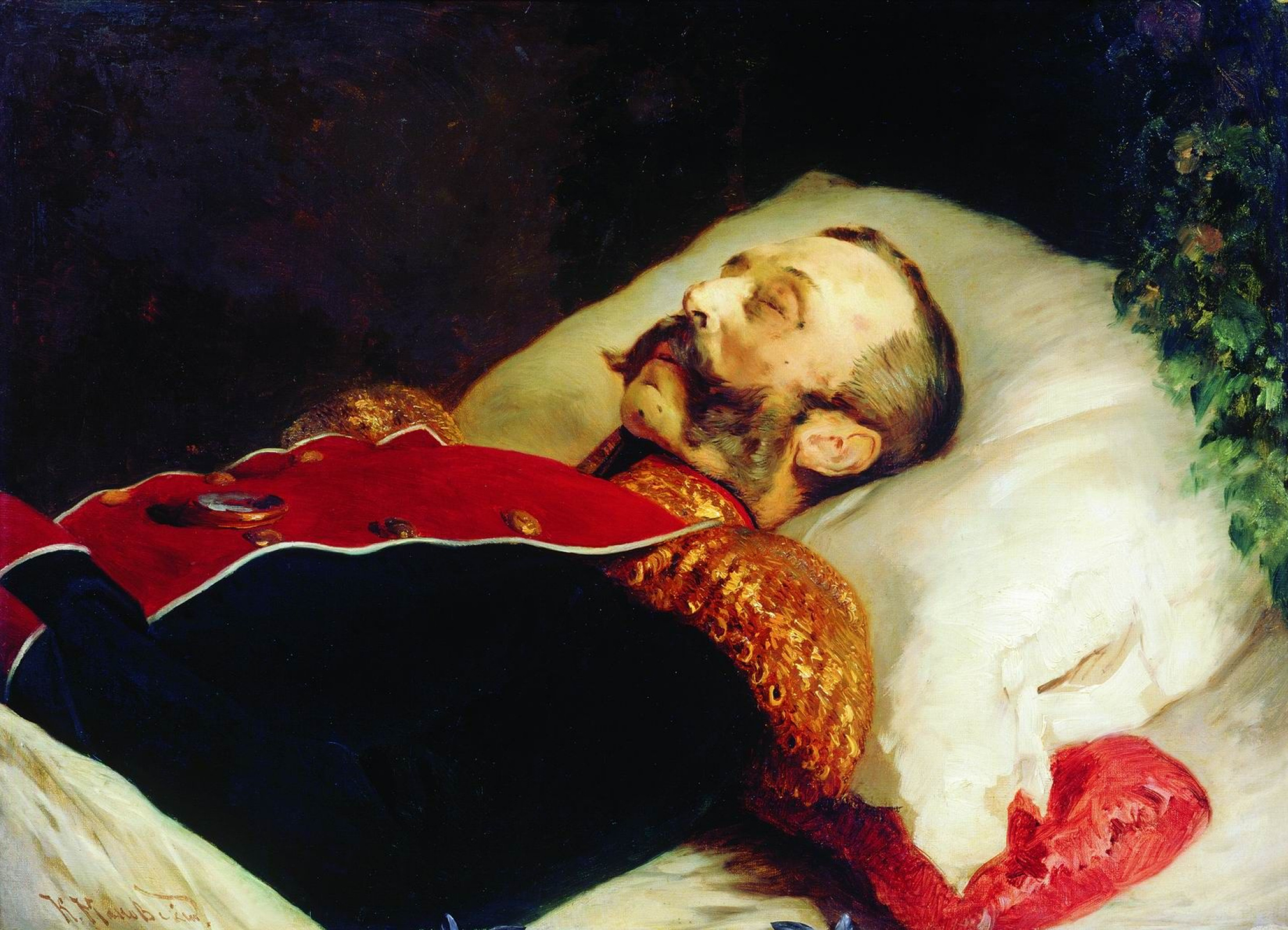
Emperor Alexander II on His Deathbed, by Konstantin Makovsky, 1881

An example of this type of portrait is the Mourning portrait of K. Horvath-Stansith, née Kiss, a 1680s painting by an anonymous Baroque artist in the Slovak National Gallery.

This painting shows a postmortem portrait of a woman from the Horvath-Stansith family, K. Horvath-Stansith. She appears to be lying on a bed, but her body has been specially prepared and she is lying not on a bed, but a prepared catafalque laid with a Kilim carpet and special red damask cushion. Her fingers have already discoloured and thread is wrapped around her thumbs. Theoretically, the location is her local church and this is how she looked during the funeral service. She is wearing the costume of the former Hungarian region of Levoča and the closefitting cap she has on is probably not the headgear she wore when she was alive.

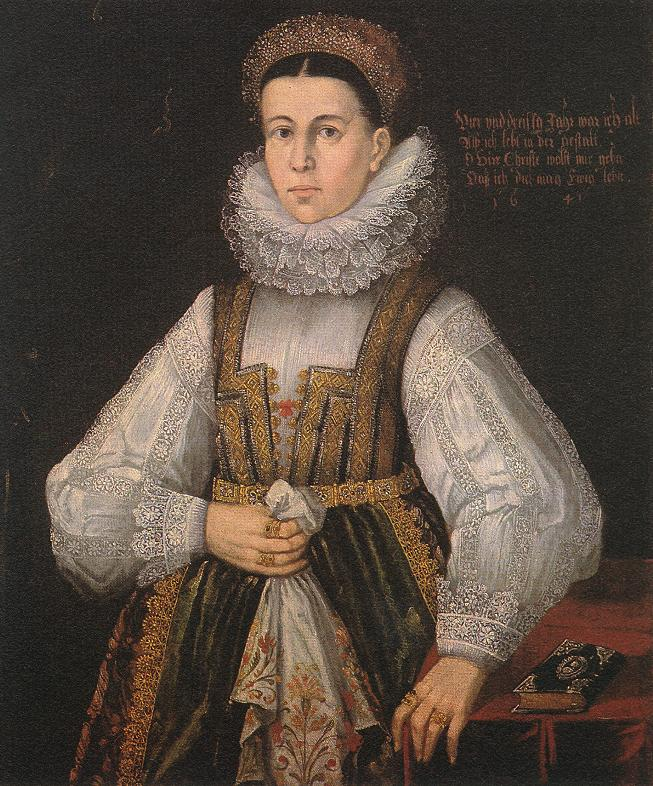
Unknown Woman of Levoča, 1641, by unknown painter, with similar bodice to K. Horvath-Stansith

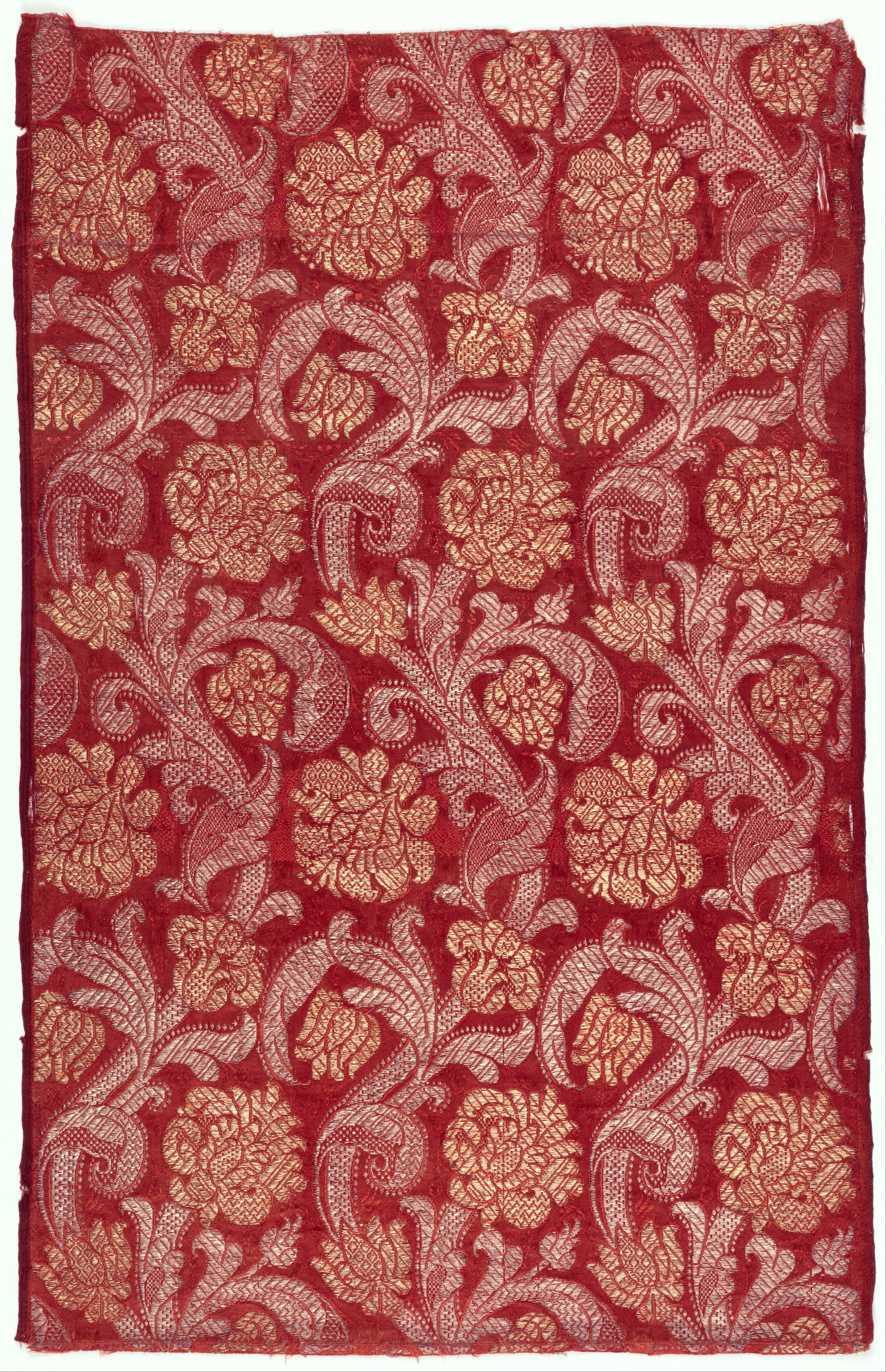
Red damask fragment from the same time period

== See also ==
- Coffin portrait
