= Daniel Vosmaer =

Dutch Golden Age painter

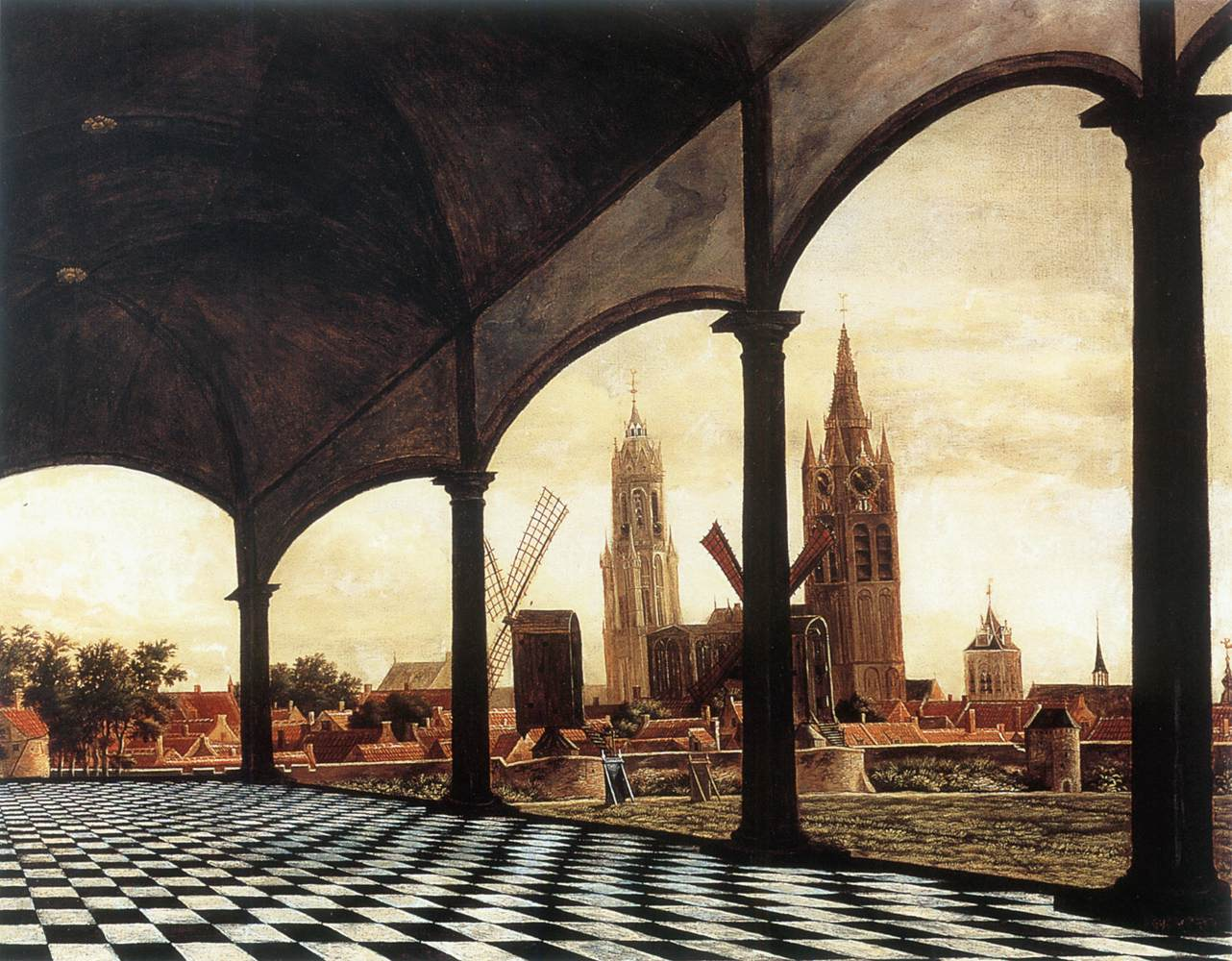
A View of Delft through an Imaginary Loggia, 1663

Daniël Vosmaer (c. 1630 in Delft – after 1666 in Den Briel), was a Dutch Golden Age painter.

== Biography ==
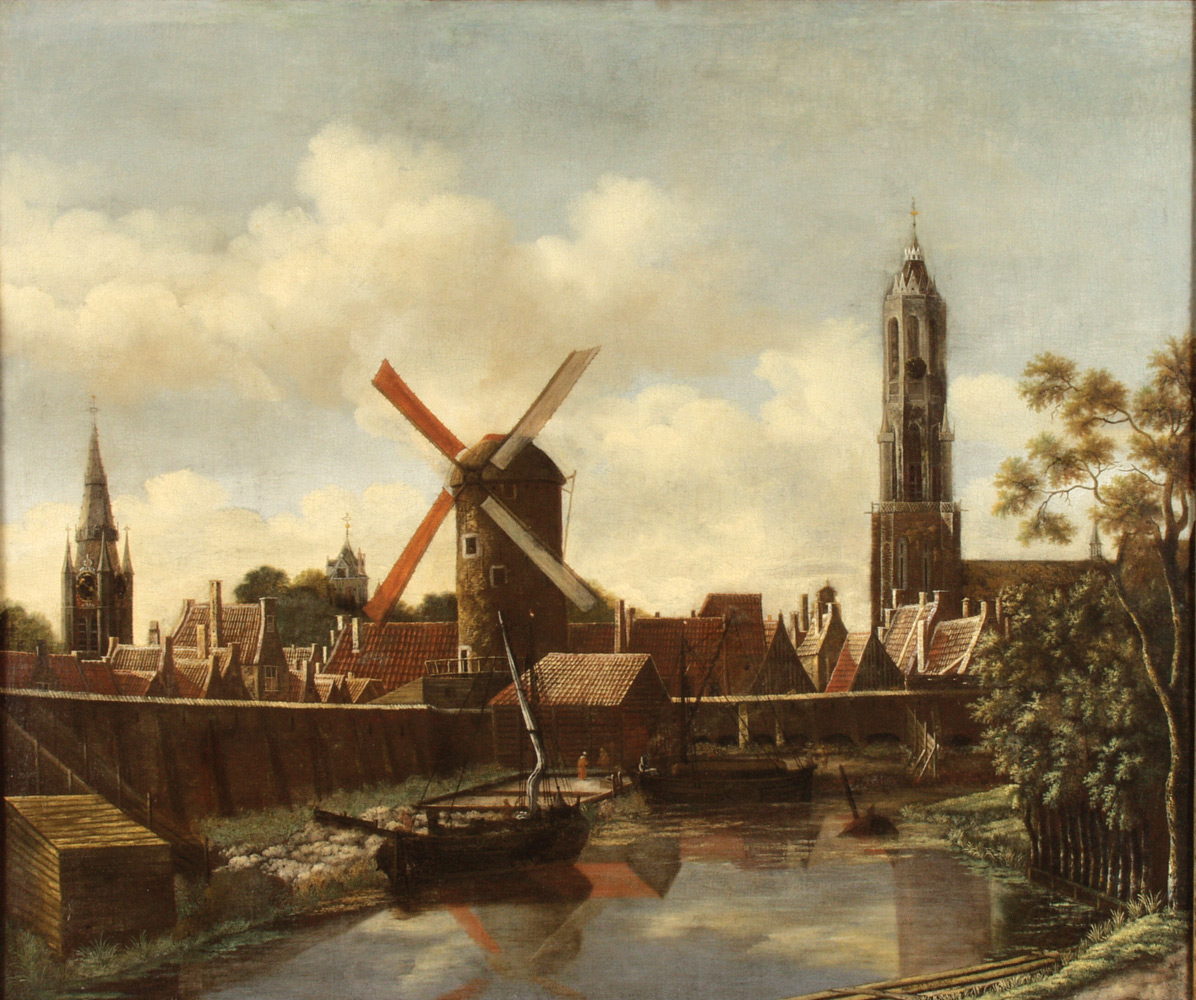
Vosmaer's The Harbour of Delft at Museo de Arte de Ponce, Ponce, Puerto Rico

According to the RKD, he was the son of the silversmith Arent Wouteresz, the younger brother of Abraham, the nephew of Jacob Vosmaer, and the nephew of Christiaen van Couwenbergh. Like his uncle Jacob (who was probably his first teacher), he started out painting landscapes and later switched to townscapes, perhaps because of the popularity of these after the Delft explosion of 1654. He joined the Delft guild in 1650. In 1666 he moved to Den Briel, which is probably where he later died.
