= Huybrecht Jacobsz Grimani =

Dutch Golden Age painter

Huybrecht Jacobsz, or Hubertus Grimani (1562 in Delft – 1651 in Den Briel), was a Dutch Golden Age painter.

== Biography ==
According to biographer Arnold Houbraken he was a contemporary of Adriaen van Utrecht who travelled to Italy and spent many years in the service of Marino Grimani (doge) in Venice, whose name he adopted. Houbraken was quoting Joachim von Sandrart.

According to Karel van Mander, Hubrecht Iacobsz was the master of Pieter Cornelisz van Rijck for 6 months after van Rijk had already trained with Jacob Willemsz Delff in Delft 3 years before that for 2 months. Together, master and pupil travelled to Italy, where Rijk spent 15 years.

According to Hessel Miedema who researched van Mander's Schilder-boeck, Grimani and van Rijk travelled to Italy in 1588, and Grimani was listed in the Delft Guild book, opened in 1613, as the second best painter of Delft after Michael Mierevelt. The Utrecht diaries of Aernout van Buchel also mentioned him as one of two noteworthy painters in Delft in May 1598. According to Dirk van Bleiswijk, who wrote a history of Delft, he was born between 1556 and 1566, and was 9 or 10 years with Marino Grimani who became doge in 1595. He was buried on April 11, 1631 according to a Necrology of Delft artists by J. Soutendam. No known works are currently attributed to him.
