= Johan van Nes =

Dutch Golden Age painter

Johan Dircksz. van Nes (died 1650 in Delft), was a Dutch Golden Age painter.

== Biography ==
According to Houbraken he was a pupil of Michiel van Mierevelt, and was able to travel on the proceeds of his own painting ability. He travelled in France and Italy.

According to the RKD he was the pupil of Michiel Jansz van Mierevelt and the teacher of the painter Christiaen van Couwenbergh. Johan van Nes painted a portrait of the priest Joannes Stalpart van der Wielen.
