= Hans Jordaens =

Flemish painter (1555–1630)

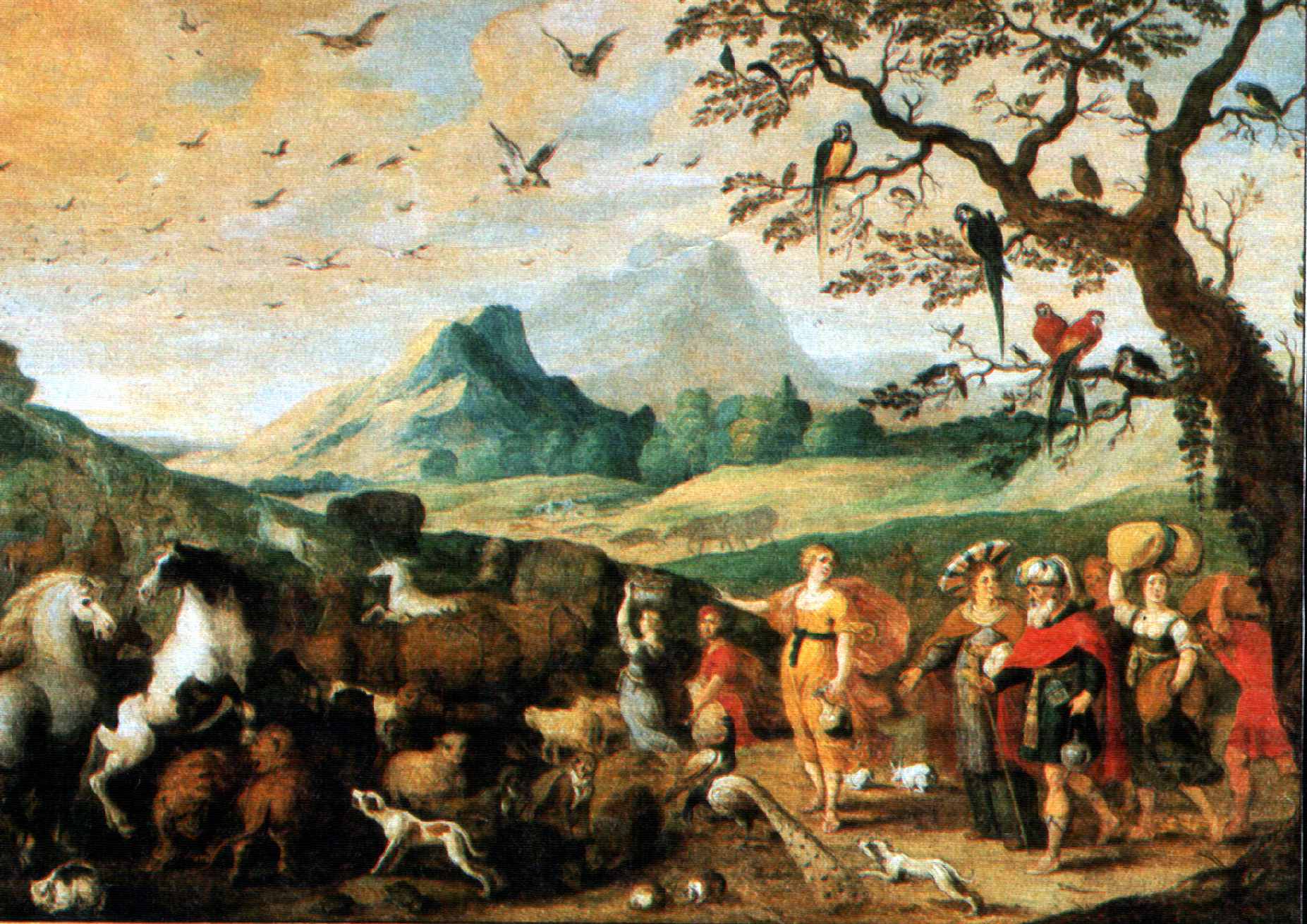
- 'Noah's Ark by Hans Jordaens the Elder.
- Born: 1555; Antwerp
- Died: 1630 (aged 74–75); Delft
- Known for: Painting
- Movement: Dutch Golden Age painting

Hans Jordaens the Elder (1555–1630), was a Flemish Baroque painter whose religious works are often confused with that of other painters with the same name.

== Biography ==
He was born in Antwerp, but after the siege of Antwerp, his family moved to Delft in 1589, where he later joined the Guild of St. Luke there in 1613. According to Karel van Mander he had been a pupil of Martin Van Cleve who first became a member of the Antwerp guild in 1579. He was a good landscape and staffage painter currently (ca.1603-1604) living in Delft, who took as his wife, the second wife of Frans Pourbus the Elder after he died suddenly in 1580.

His pupil was Anthonie Palamedesz. in Delft. The later art historian Arnold Houbraken, who mentioned his data was sketchy at best, confused this painter with his probable later descendants Hans III Jordaens (1590–1643) and the later Rome traveller Hans IV Jordaens (1616–1680). Houbraken mentions that he (Hans IV) was born in Delft, and travelled to Rome and received the nickname Pollepel (spoon) from the Bentvueghels, for his ability to spoon up figures on canvas. The widow of the lawyer Nicolaas Muys van Holy (1653/54-1717) owned a painting by him (Hans III) of the Pharaoh's army crossing the red sea and drowning with horses and wagons. Most such paintings are now attributed to Hans III Jordaens (d.1643), of Antwerp.

== Son? ==
Houbraken also mentioned that Luca Giordano was possibly his son from the period that he lived in Naples (his tone shows he felt this unlikely), whose works hung (ca. 1712–1718) in the gallery of Jan van Beuningen in Amsterdam. Though this has been dismissed by later historians, there is evidence of an engraver L. Jordaens who was active around 1660 and who could have been the son of Hans IV. He worked with the mapmaker Zacharias Roman on landscapes of Zeeland.

He died in Delft, or Voorburg.
