= Pieter Cornelisz van Rijck =

Dutch painter (1567–c. 1637)

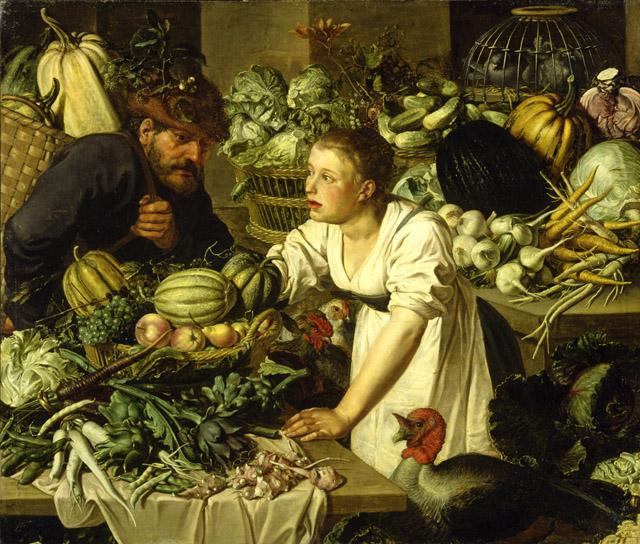
- 'Market stall with two figures, 1622.
- Born: Pieter Cornelisz; 1567; Delft
- Died: 1637 (aged 69–70); Italy
- Known for: Painting
- Movement: Baroque

Pieter Cornelisz van Rijck (1567–c. 1637), was a Dutch Golden Age painter.

== Biography ==
He was the son of the Haarlem brewer Cornelis van Rijck, brother of the Delft brewer Adriaen and a cousin of the Haarlem still life painter Floris van Dyck.

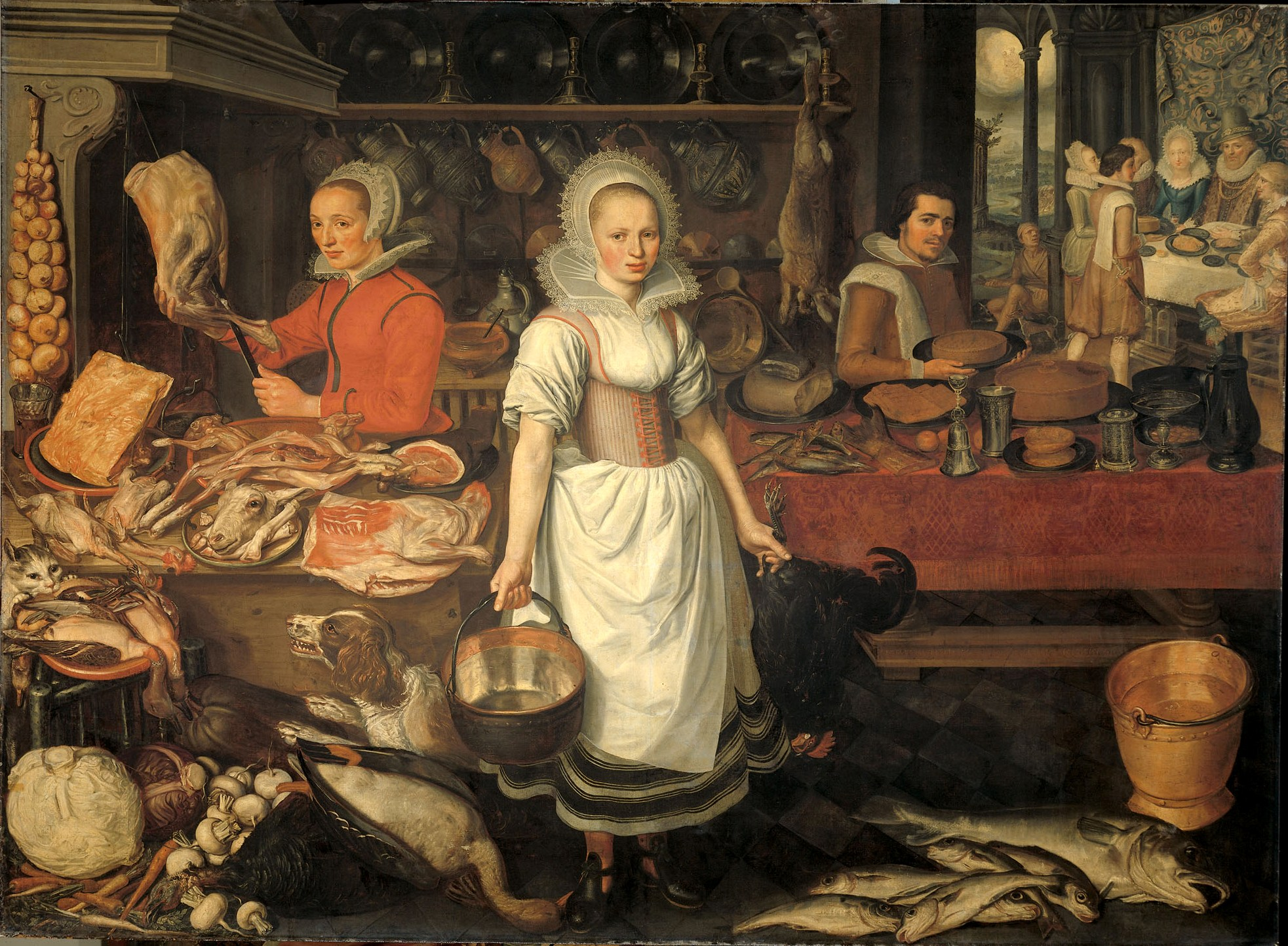
Lazarus and the rich man, 1620

According to Van Mander in 1604, he learned to draw from Jacob Willemsz Delff, but was meant for another profession, and spent time on other business for a few years before returning to the arts under the tutelage of Huybrecht Jacobsz Grimani for 6 months. He accompanied him to Italy, where he remained for 15 years, working for local and visiting nobility all over Italy. At the time van Mander was writing, in 1602-1604, he was living in Haarlem (aged 36) and discussed Italian painters with him. Van Mander mentions a kitchen piece with a rich man and Lazarus by his hand that was painted for the Het Dolhuys and could be seen there. Van Mander called him a follower of Bassaens (Jacopo Bassano).

Houbraken mentioned him as one of the important contemporary painters listed in Van Mander.

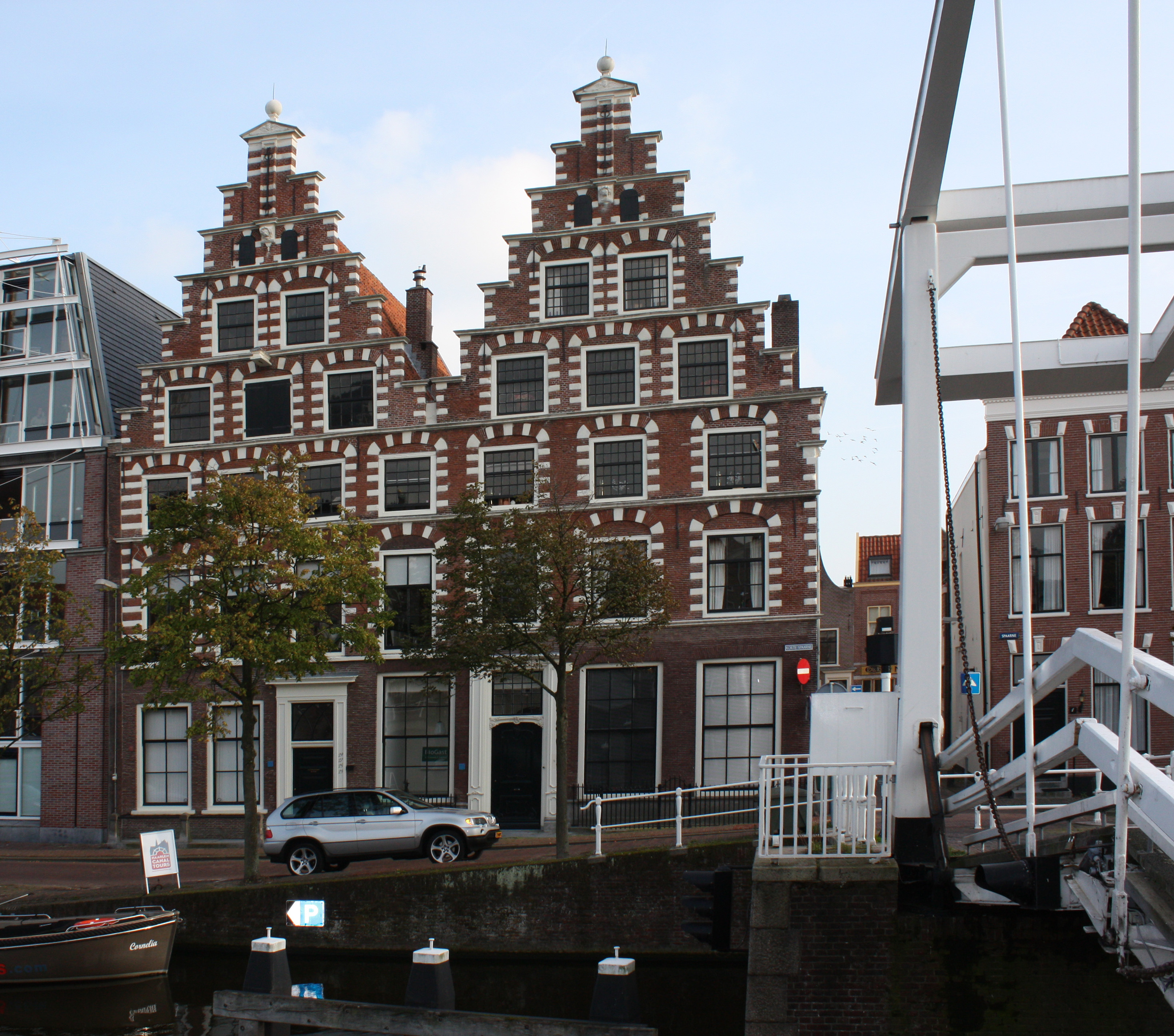
The former brewery "De Olyphant" in Haarlem, where Pieter's father Cornelis van Rijck moved after young Pieter was born in Delft, and where he and later his cousin Floris probably kept a studio.

According to the RKD he was registered in Venice 1588-1602, Haarlem 1602-1604, and returned to Italy in 1605. He painted portraits, kitchen pieces, and market scenes and lived in Naples 1632- 1637.
