= Pieter Jansz van Ruyven =

Dutch painter (1651–1719)

- Born: 1651; Delft, Dutch Republic
- Died: 1719; Delft, Dutch Republic
- Education: Willem Doudijns; Hans IV Jordaens
- Known for: large decorative pieces for ceilings and walls
- Movement: Dutch Golden Age; Baroque

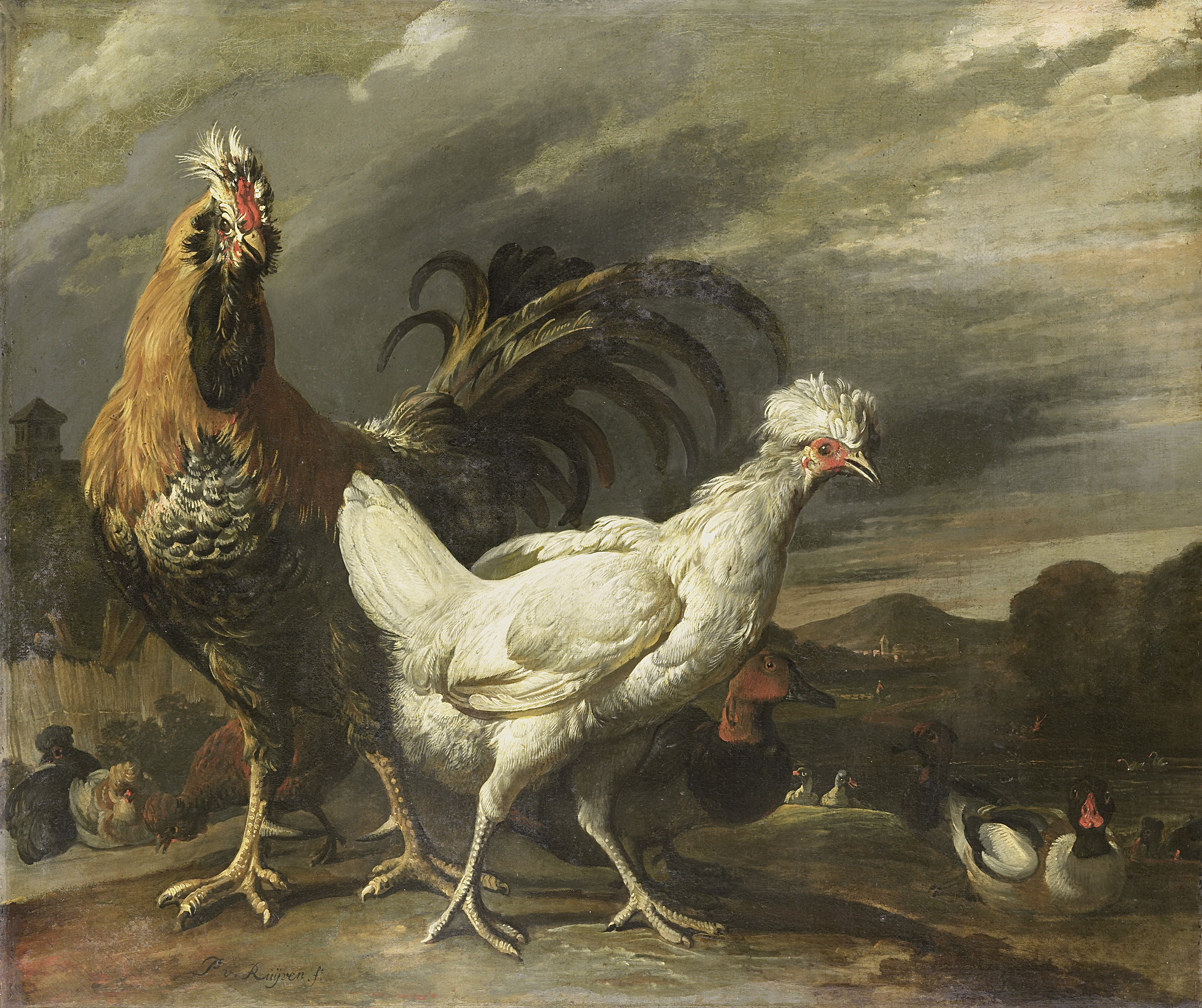
Pieter Jansz. van Ruijven: A cock, a chicken and other fowl, between 1670 and 1690. Rijksmuseum Amsterdam.

Pieter Jansz van Ruyven (1651, Delft – 1719, Delft), was a Dutch Golden Age painter.

== Biography ==
According to Houbraken he was a pupil of Jacob Jordaens who became specialized in large decorative pieces for ceilings, and walls. He made the festive triumphal arches for the joyous entry of William III of England in the Hague. He knew the painter Adriaen Cornelisz van Linschoten as an old man in Delft.

According to the RKD he was a pupil of Willem Doudijns and became a member of the Confrerie Pictura in the Hague. Most of his known works are still installed in the buildings for which they were made. Although he is registered in Antwerp and in the Hague when Jacob Jordaens was there, the RKD claims he was also a pupil of Hans IV Jordaens, not Jacques Jordaens.

== Ceiling painting Entry of the Queen of Sheba in Jerusalem ==
Possibly by van Ruyven:

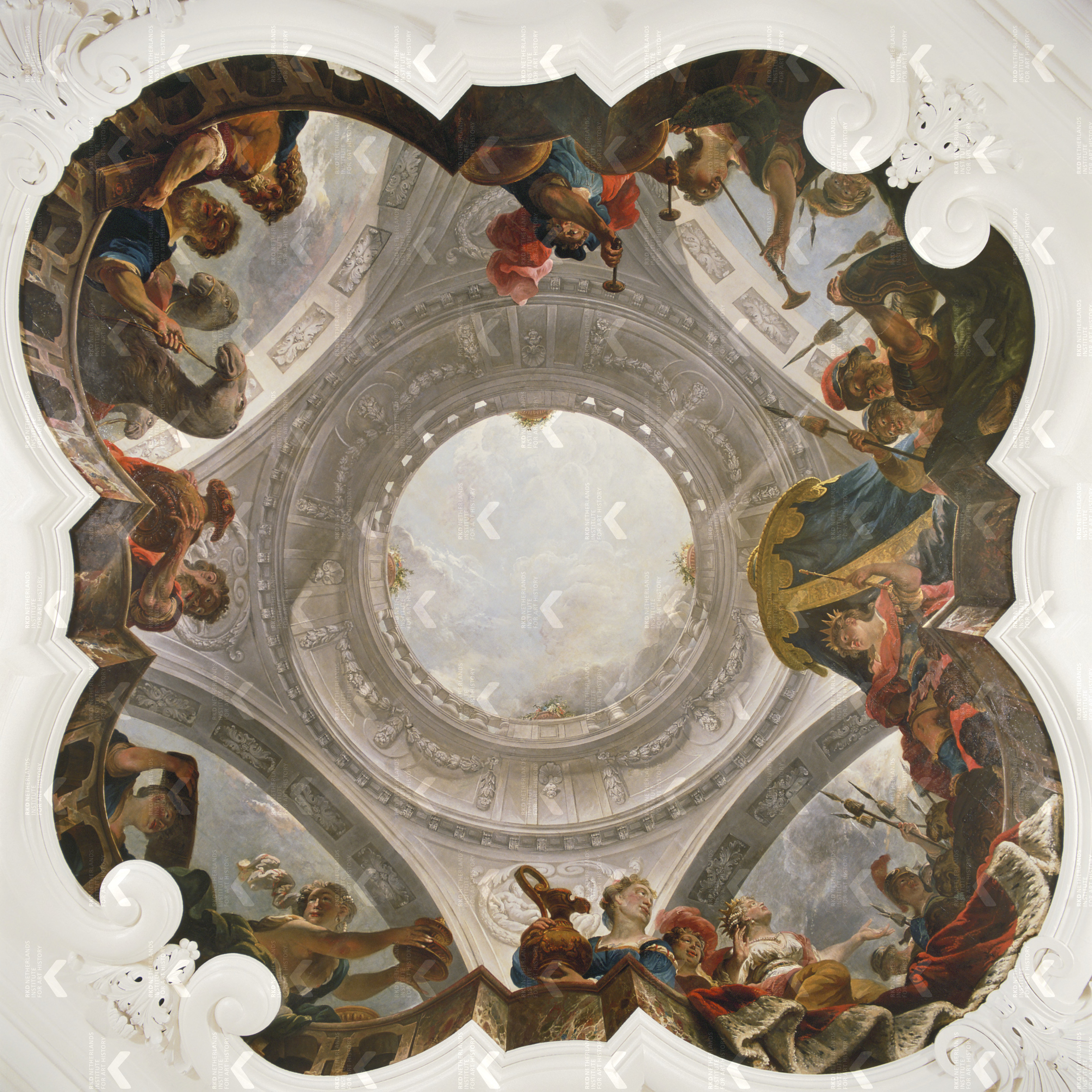
Entry of the Queen of Sheba in Jerusalem, 1700-1709.

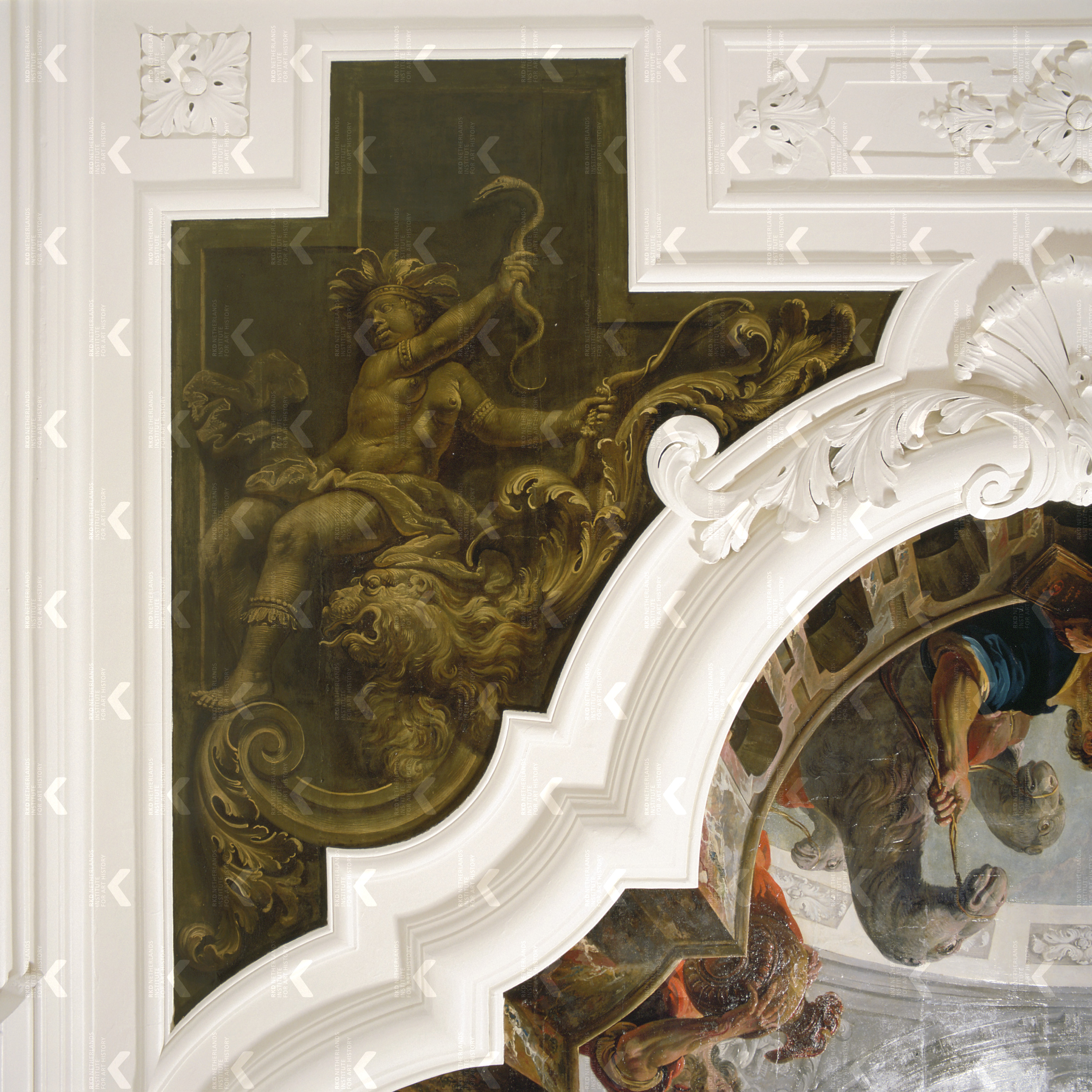
Allegory of the continent of Africa, corner piece.

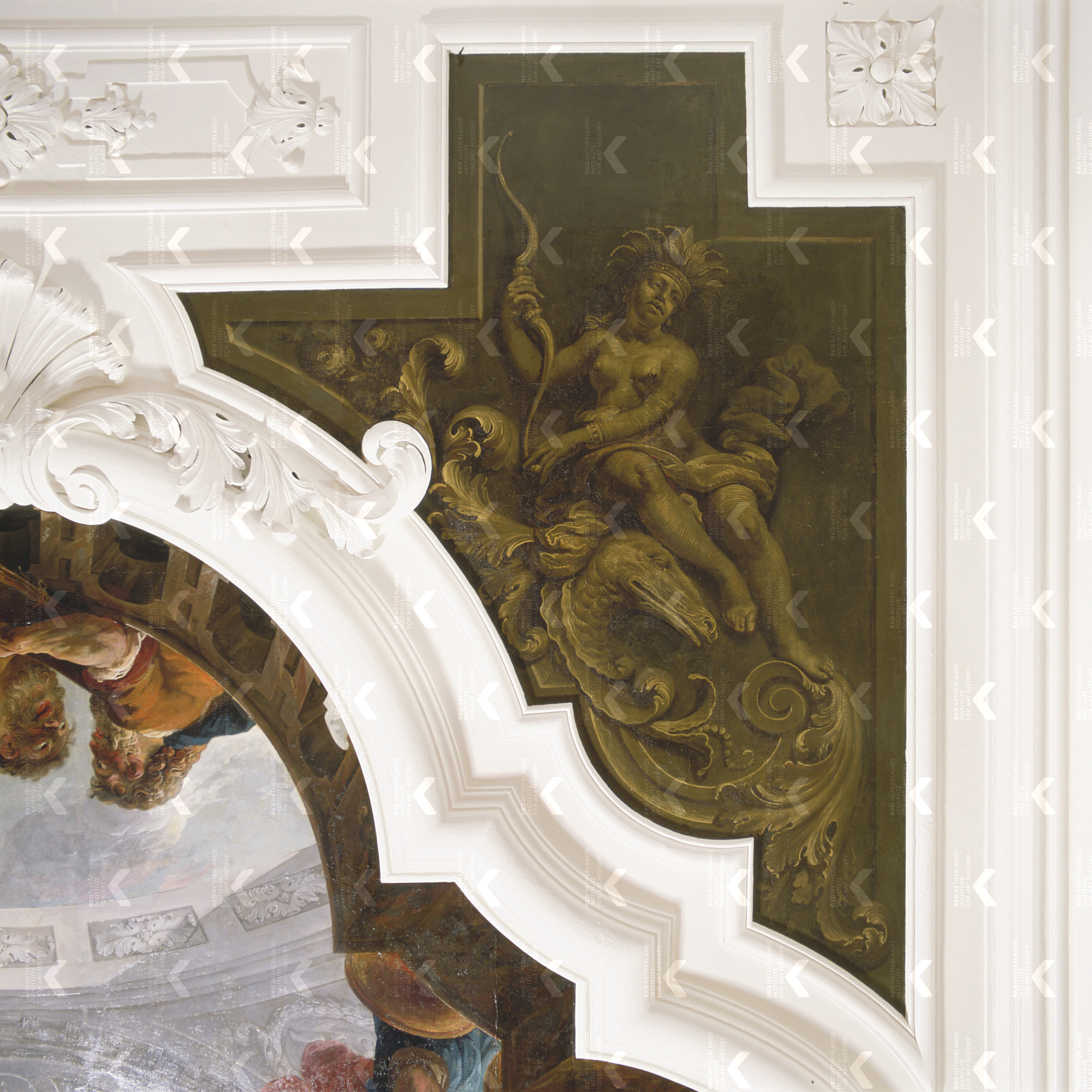
America, corner piece.

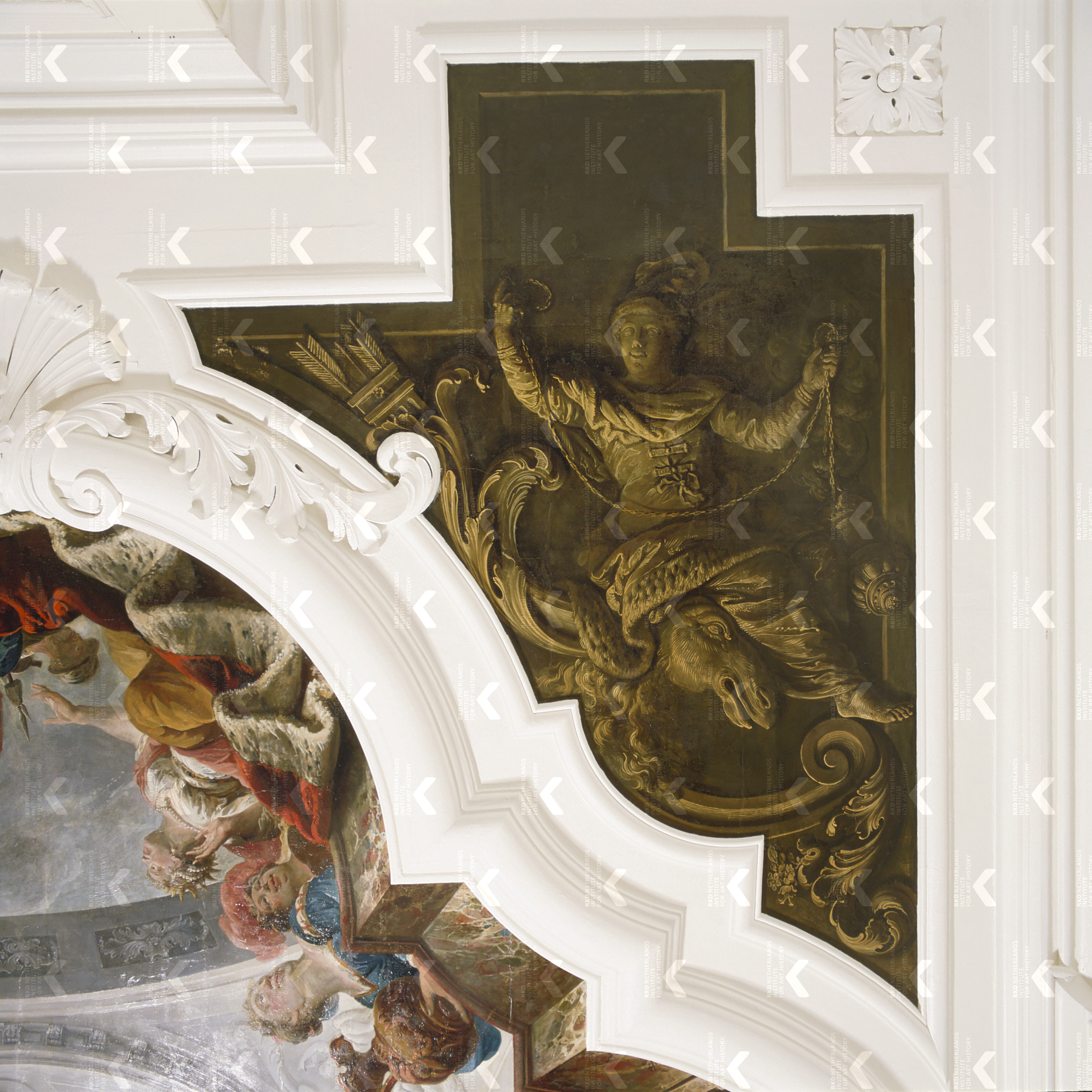
Asia, corner piece.

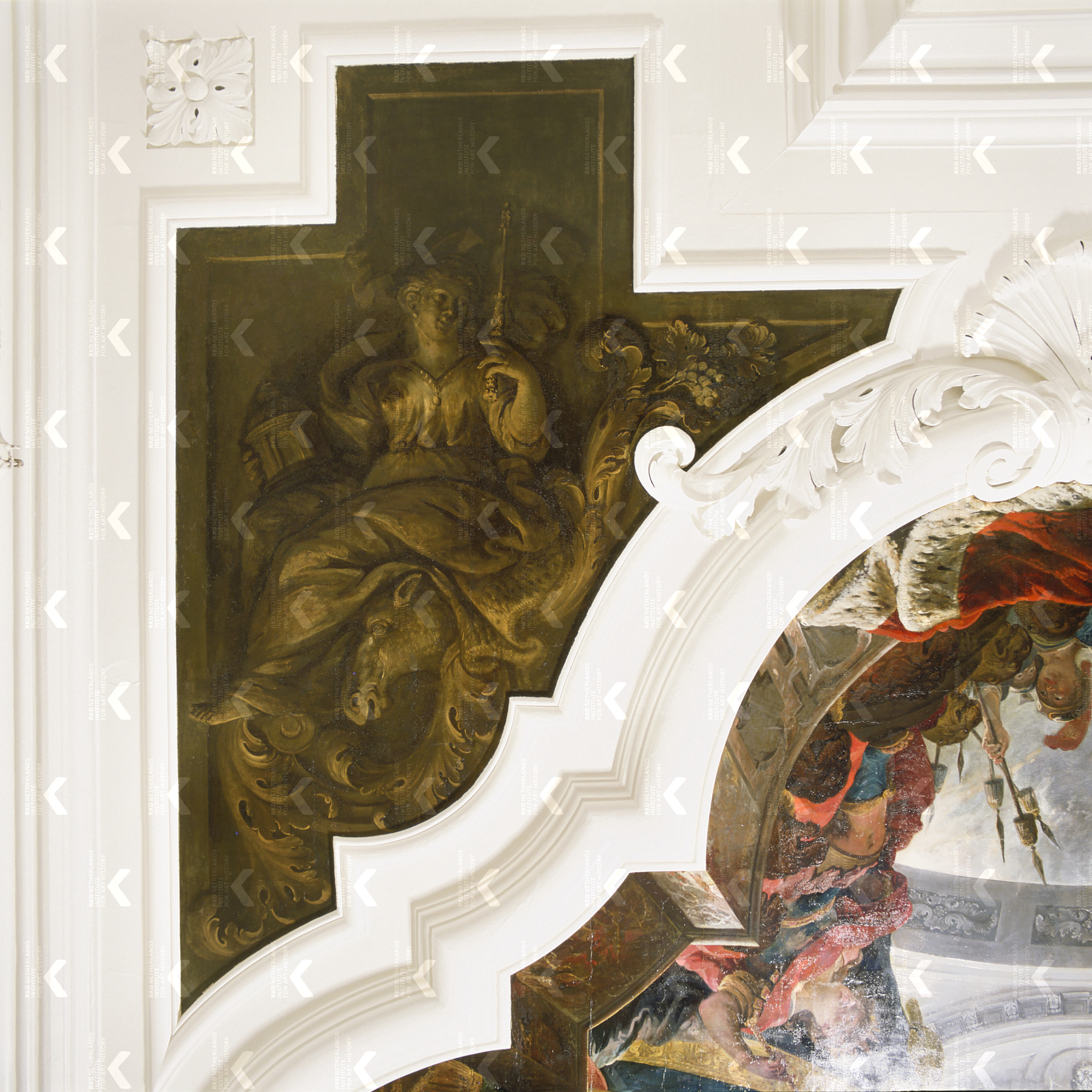
Europe, corner piece.
