= Adriaen Cornelisz van Linschoten =

Dutch Golden Age painter

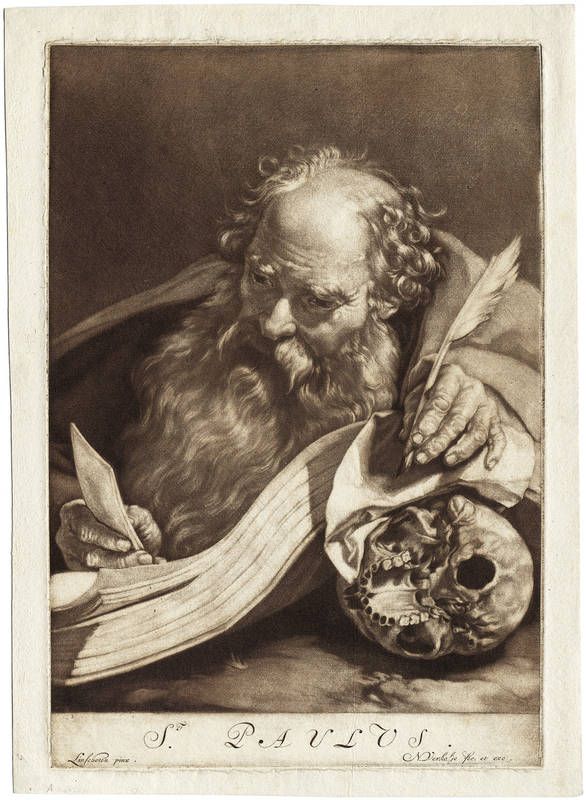
Paul the apostle, mezzotint by Nicolaas Verkolje after a painting by Linschoten.

Adriaen Cornelisz. van Linschoten (1590 in Delft – 1677 in The Hague), was a Dutch Golden Age painter.

== Biography ==
According to Houbraken he was a regent of the Delft Guild of St. Luke (listed as Kornelis Adriaan Linschoten in 1627) and "some said" the student of "Spanjolet". He was in any case, not a proponent of "wellevenskunst" (virtue), since Houbraken felt Linschoten's painting style and lifestyle were both far from virtuous. In 1634 Linschoten travelled to Brabant where he married and had two daughters. He returned with his family to Delft, where Pieter Jansz van Ruyven knew him as an old man in 1677 or 1678 and admired his work. Ruyven remembered specifically a story where a church pastor had ordered a painting of Paul the Apostle showing sorrow for his sins and crying to the servant girl of the high priests, and when Linschoten asked if he had painted the "crybaby" well enough, "since though he had been drunk and sorry himself, he had never cried about it enough to feel the emotion", the patron was so insulted he refused to buy the painting from such a heathen, though he admired it greatly. Houbraken saw a painting by Linschoten at the home of a gunpowder manufacturer named Mr. Van der Heul in Delft outside the Waterloose Poort. It was a painting of an alchemist in his studio, and Houbraken liked it very much.

According to the RKD he was a pupil of Joris van Lier in 1623 and then travelled to Italy, but was back in 1634 when he became a member of the Delft Guild of St. Luke. He moved to The Hague in 1646 but was banned from the city more than once for disorderly conduct. He is known for still life paintings, and genre pieces. The "Kornelis Adriaan Linschoten" that Houbraken mentioned may have been his father, but this is not registered in the RKD.
