= Hans IV Jordaens =

Dutch Golden Age painter (1616–1680)

Hans IV Jordaens (1616 in Delft – 1680 in Voorburg) was a Dutch Golden Age painter who travelled to Rome.

== Biography ==
According to Houbraken he was born in Delft in 1616, where he became a grand master. He spent a long time in Rome, Venice, and Naples, and Houbraken wasn't sure if his best work started before or after this trip. He could "spoon up his figures on his paintings with ease" and was called "Potlepel" or "Brypotlepel" by the Bentvueghels for this. Houbraken also mentioned that Luca Giordano was claimed to be his son (from his time in Naples presumably), and whose works hung in the gallery of Jan van Beuningen in Amsterdam. An engraver named L. Jordaens was active around 1660 and could have been the son of Hans IV. L. Jordaens worked with the mapmaker Zacharias Roman on landscapes of Zeeland.

According to the RKD, he was in Rome during the years 1643-1650 and his nickname was "Brypotlepel". He was in Leiden during the years 1654-1656. He was possibly the son of Symon Jordaens I, and was the teacher of Pieter Jansz van Ruyven.

No known works survive that are attributed to him specifically, since his biographical data has been confused with that of Hans Jordaens.
