= Christiaen van Couwenbergh =

Dutch Golden Age painter (1604–1667)

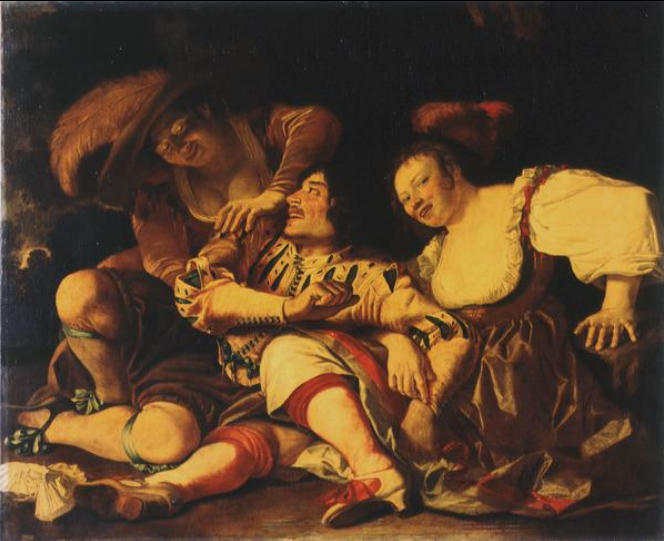
Christiaen van Couwenbergh, The Prodigal Son, Museum Kunst Palast

Christiaen van Couwenbergh (8 July 1604 – 4 July 1667) was a Dutch Golden Age painter.

== Biography ==
Couwenbergh was born in Delft. His father Gillis was a silversmith, engraver, and art dealer from Mechelen. Gillis had moved to Delft before 1604 where he married Adriaantje Vosmaer, the sister of the flower painter Jacob Vosmaer. Christiaen learned to paint from Johan van Nes, and then entered the Guild of St. Luke in Delft in 1627. He then travelled back and forth to Italy. After his return, he settled in The Hague where he joined the Confrerie Pictura in 1647 and became deacon in 1649. He specialized in large historical allegories as wall decorations, often with life-sized nudes. He not only painted, but also produced drawings and designs for tapestries. His patrons were Frederick Henry, Prince of Orange, among other royal admirers, for wall decorations at Huis ter Nieuwburg, Huis ten Bosch and Huis Honselaarsdijk. Queen Christina of Sweden purchased a series of tapestries designed by him.

He later moved to Cologne between 1654 and 1656, where he later died. He is known for portraits and historical allegories and is judged to be one of those influenced by Caravaggio.
