= Jacob Vosmaer =

Dutch Golden Age painter

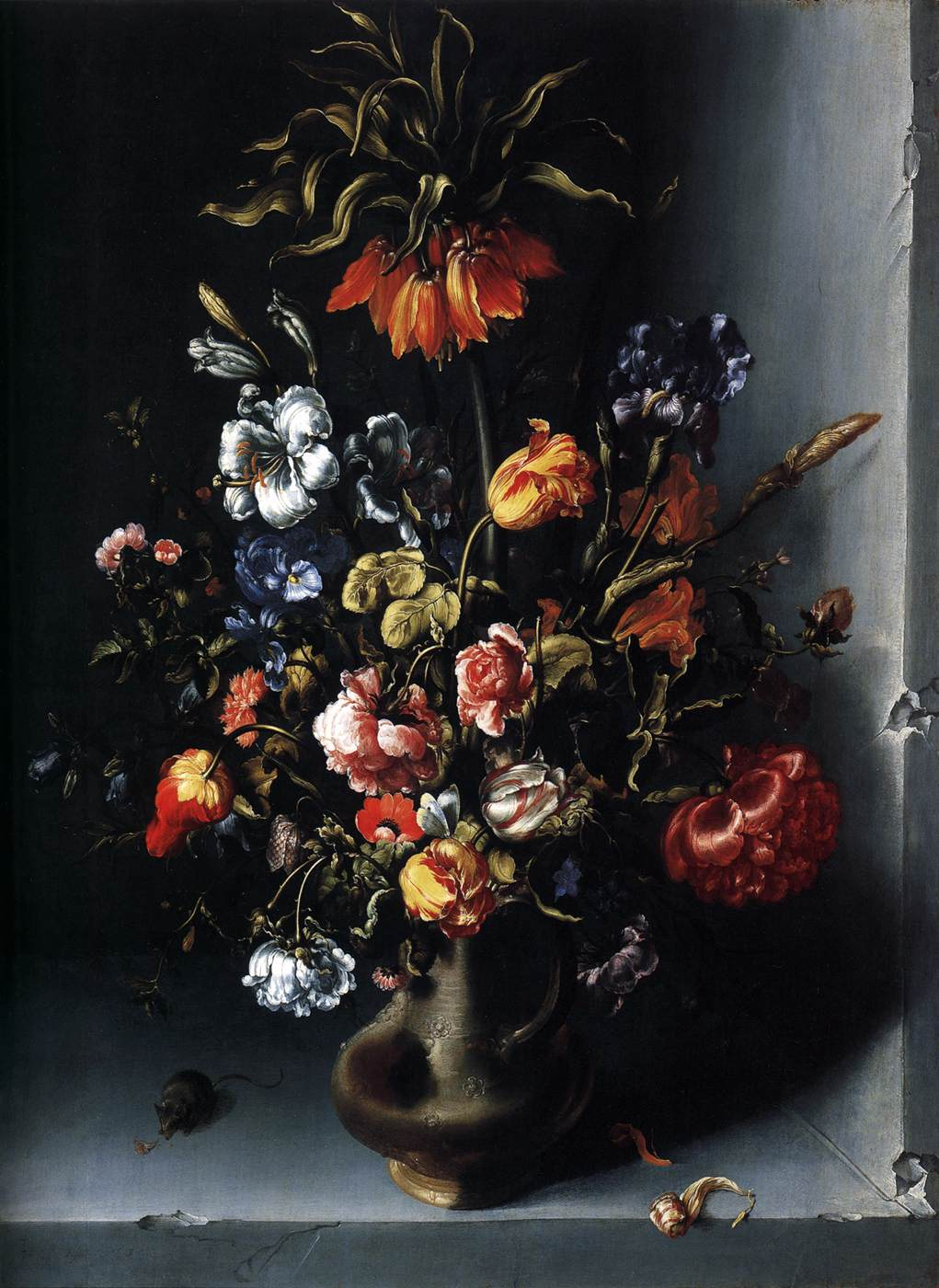
Still-Life of Flowers with a Fritillary in a Stone Niche

Jacob Vosmaer (1584, Delft – 1641, Delft) was a Dutch Golden Age painter.

== Biography ==
According to Houbraken he was born in Delft as a descendant of an old line of Vosmeers. According to the RKD he was the son of the Delft gold- and silversmith Wouter Vosmaer, and the brother of the silversmith Arent Woutersz Vosmaer.

He started his career as a landscape specialist, but switched to flowers, which brought him more success. He visited Italy as a young man and returned to Delft in 1608 at the age of 24, where he remained and became a respected citizen, and major in the schutterij.

He became a member of the Delft Guild of St. Luke before 1613, where he was a pupil of Jacob de Gheyn II. He later taught his nephews Daniel Vosmaer and Abraham Vosmeer, and the Dane Jakob Mogensen or Ebbe Ulfeldt. He was the uncle of Christiaen van Couwenbergh. No known landscapes by his hand survive.

He died in Delft in 1641.
