= Christiaen Jansz van Bieselingen =

Dutch painter

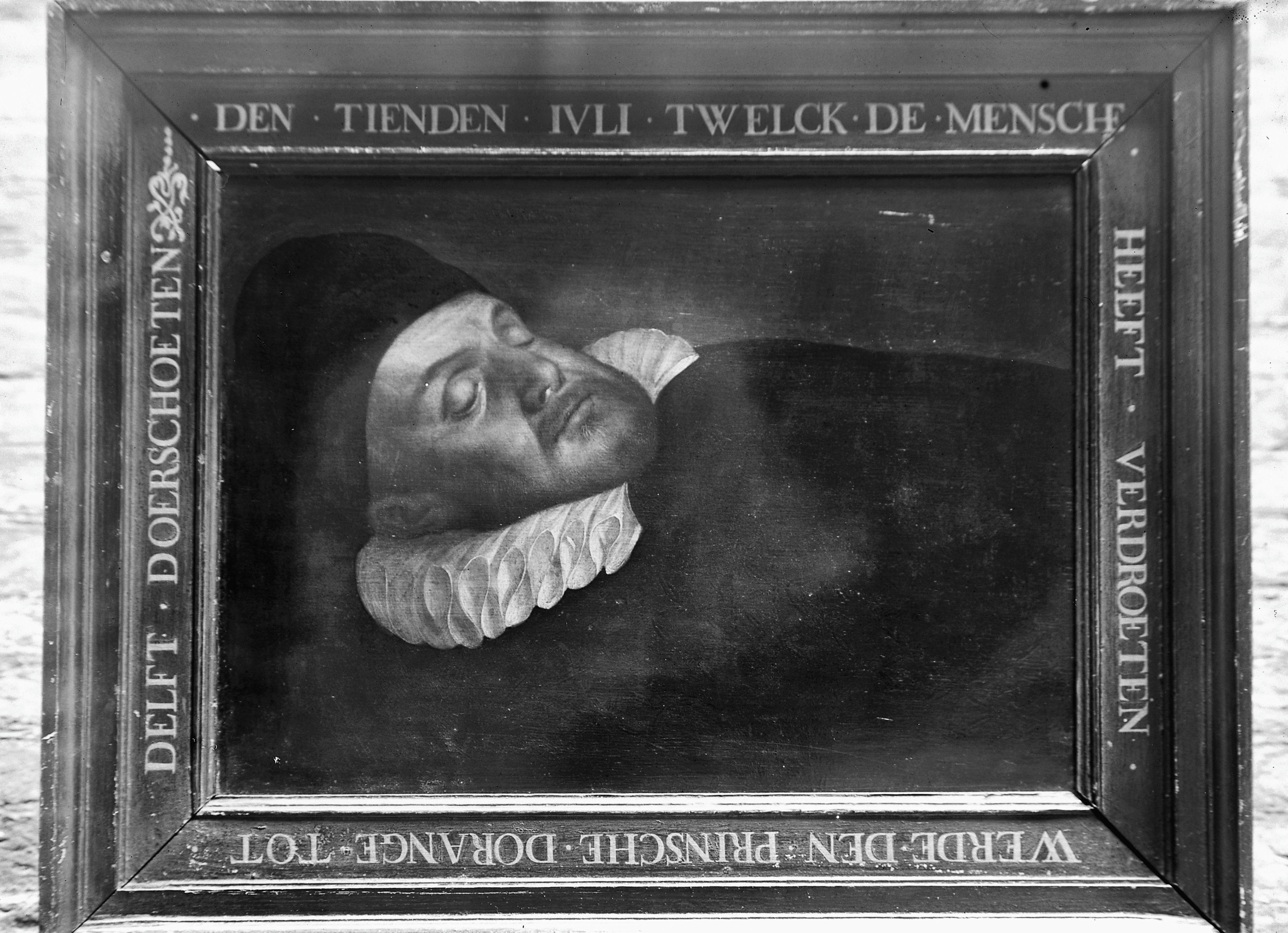
Deathbed portrait of William the Silent, by Christiaen Jansz van Bieselingen, 1584

Christiaen Jansz van Bieselingen (1558–1600) was a Dutch Golden Age painter.

== Biography ==
Van Bieselingen was born at Delft. According to Houbraken he died aged 42, having had the honor of painting the only portrait of William the Silent on his deathbed. He spent some time in Madrid at court (where his wife died) before returning to the Netherlands, where he remarried, though he died young, at Middelburg. Houbraken claimed that Hendrik Pot copied his portrait of the dead stadtholder for the magistrates' room of the City Hall (Delft).

According to the RKD he painted genre pieces, but few works have survived. He is registered in Delft, Spain, Middelburg, and in the year 1596, in The Hague.
