= Agnes Block =

Dutch botanist and art collector (1629–1704)

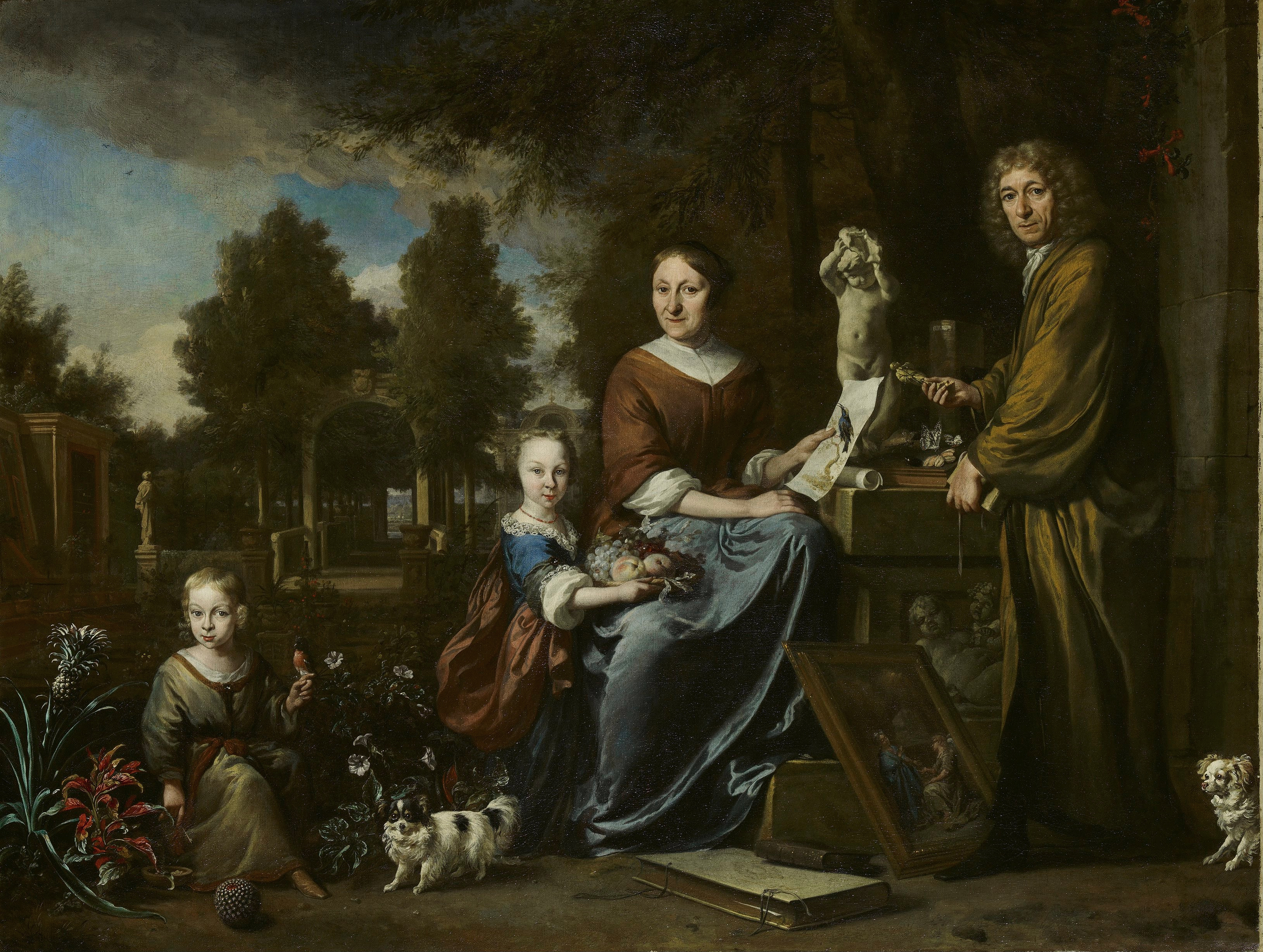
Agneta Block and her garden Flora Batava at Vijverhof, by Jan Weenix.

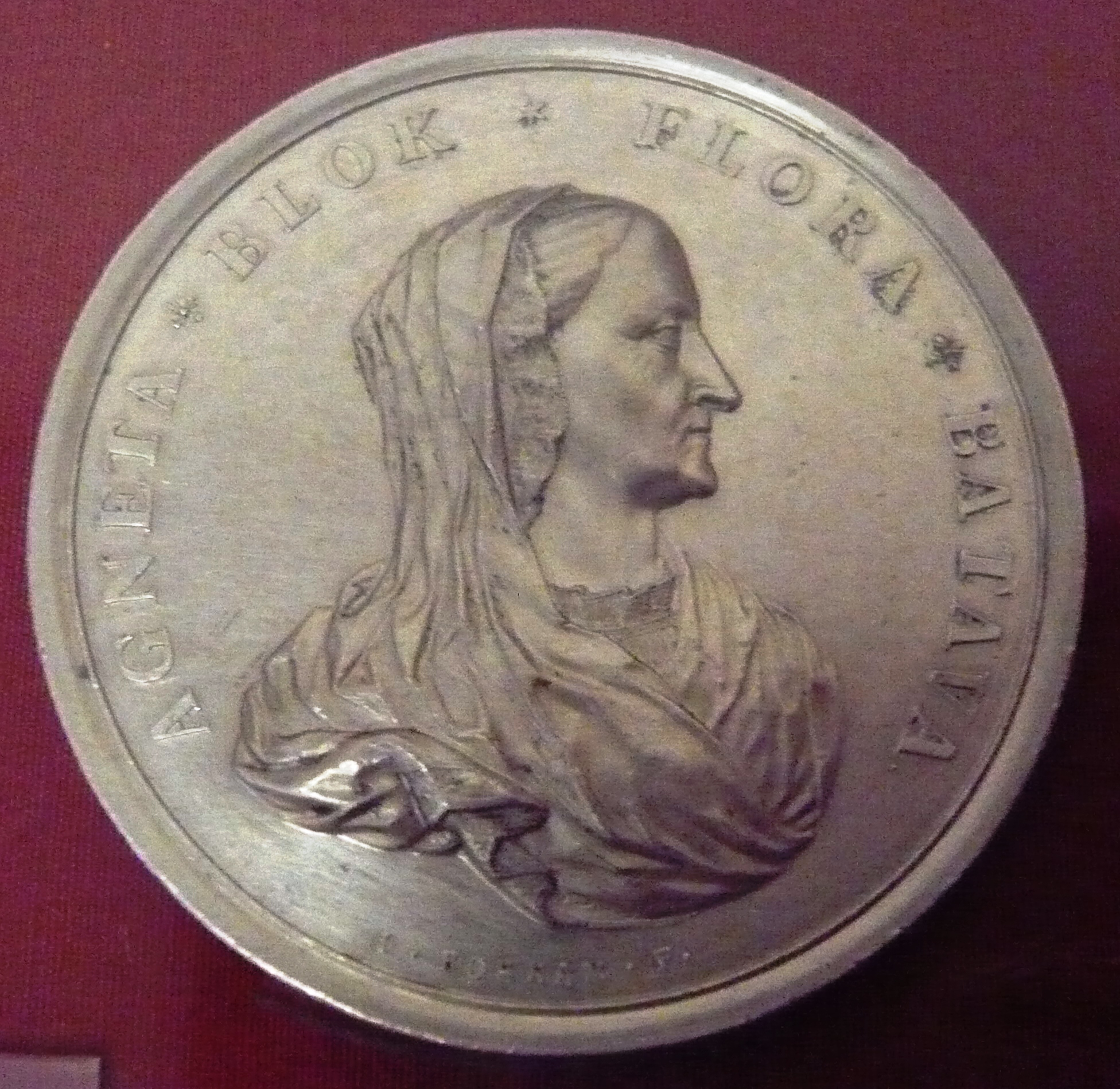
Agneta Blok as Flora Batava on a commemorative medal by Jan Boskam, 1700

Agnes, or Agneta Block (29 October 1629, Emmerich am Rhein – 20 April 1704, Amsterdam) was a Dutch art collector and horticulturalist. She is most remembered as the compiler of an album of flower and insect paintings and as one of the first Europeans to successfully cultivate and fruit the pineapple outside of its native habitat. She bore the nickname "Flora Batava," referencing the goddess of flowers and her Dutch identity. She is often lost to history because of the misspelling of her name. As well as differences in her first name, her last name was also spelled interchangeably as Block or Blok.

== Life ==
Agneta Block was the daughter of a successful Mennonite textile merchant. She became an orphan sometime after her youngest sister was born (1632). Block and her siblings then moved in with David Rutgers (1601-1668), her maternal uncle and Susanna de Flines (1607-1677), his wife. She first married Hans de Wolff (1613–1670), a silk merchant, in Amsterdam in 1649, and after he died, in 1674 she remarried in Amsterdam to Sijbrand de Flines (1623–1697). In Amsterdam, she lived on the Herengracht close to Joost van den Vondel, who became a regular visitor at her house. Vondel had married Mayken de Wolff, who was the sister of Agnes's first husband's father. This elderly uncle ate at her house on Fridays, and is probably one of her greatest influences.

== Vijverhof ==
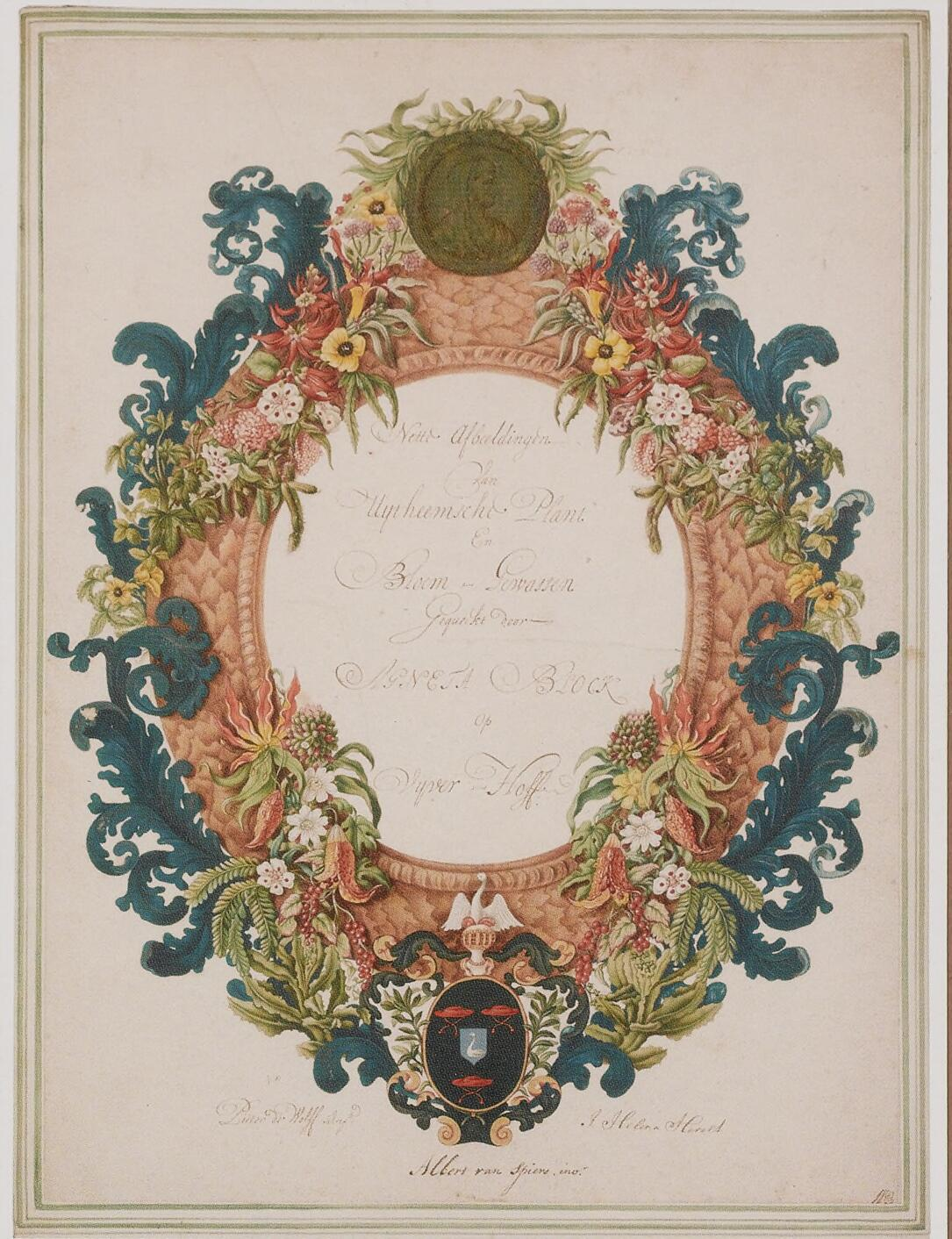
Decorative garland with a portrait medaillon at the top of Agnes Block based on a coin stamped by J. Roscam, and with the Block family coat of arms at the bottom, surrounding the text "Nette Afbeelding / Van / Uytheemsche Plant / En / Bloem - Gewassen / Gequeckt door / Agneta Block / Op / Vyver-Hoffe", and at the bottom inscribed with "Pieter de Wolff Schript / Albert van Spiers. invt / J: Helena Herolt"

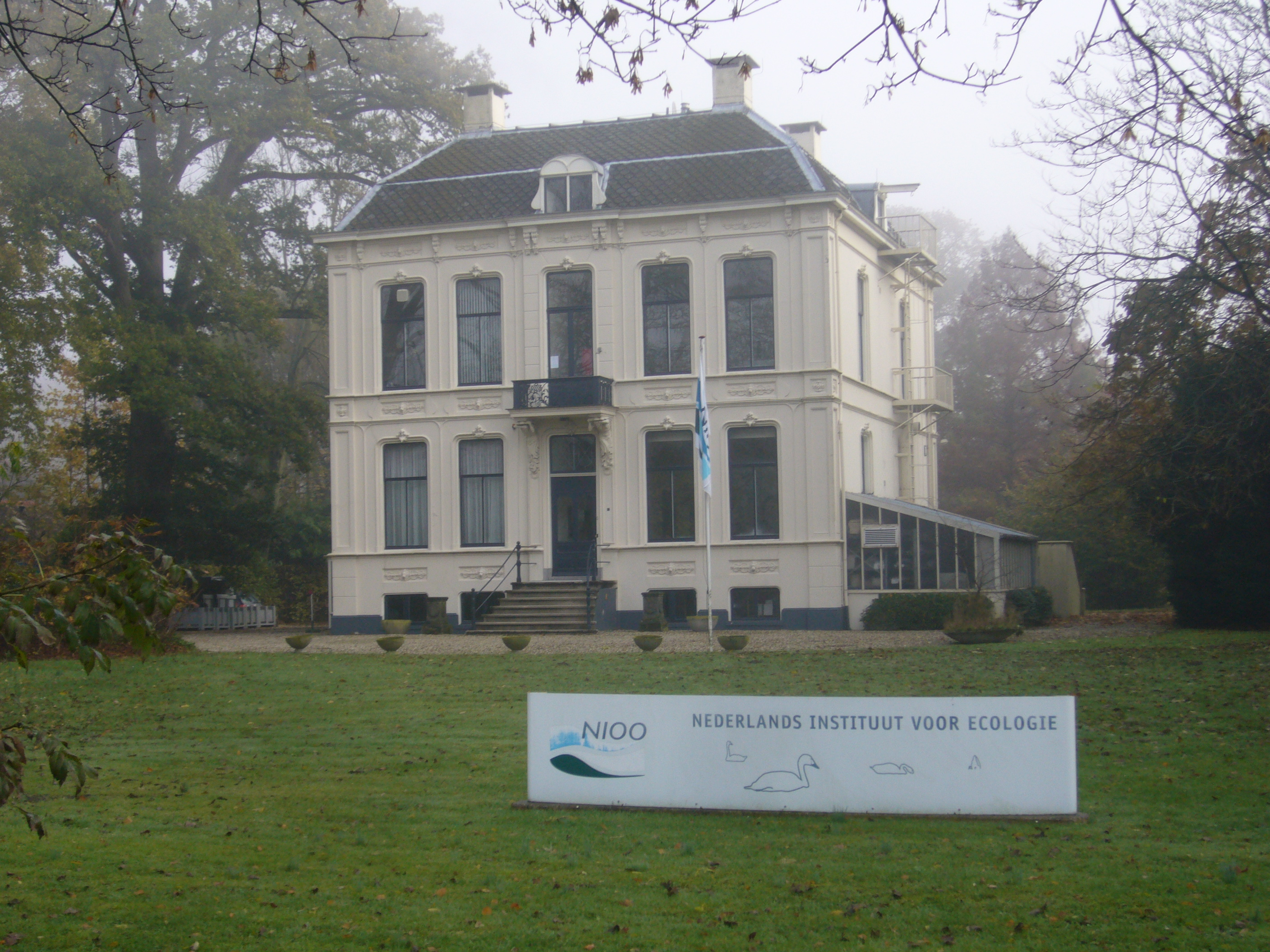
Vijverhof today; home to the Netherlands Institute for Ecology.

After the death of her first husband, Agneta bought a country estate on the Vecht river in Loenen, which she proceeded to decorate with a large collection of curiosities. She also developed the gardens of her estate, which were planted with exotic plants. Vijverhof was recognized as the largest and most reputable garden managed by a woman in the seventeenth century. She enjoyed drawing and painting in water colors, and her garden lent itself to this hobby. She is registered as an artist with the Dutch Institute of Art History as a papercut artist and painter, but no works survive. To embellish her albums, she hired artists to paint for her albums. Unfortunately, her collection and the garden have not survived, but research has revealed many of the original pages of her three albums in the albums of later collectors.

Alida Withoos was - with her brother Pieter Withoos - one of the many artists from Hoorn who painted plants while in residence at Vijverhof. Agnes Block's stepson owned a summer house in Purmerend, near Hoorn. Other painters from Hoorn were Johannes Bronkhorst, Herman Henstenburgh, and a friend of Alida's father, Otto Marseus van Schrieck.

Painters from other cities who lived at Vijverhof and made contributions were Maria Sibylla Merian (their relationship beginning on the 1690s), Merian's daughter Johanna Helena Herolts-Graff, Pieter Holsteyn II, Nicolaas Juweel (Rotterdam, 1639 - Rotterdam, 1704), Jan Moninckx, Maria Moninckx, Herman Saftleven, Rochus van Veen, Marino Benaglia Venetiano, and Nicolaes de Vree.

As well as being a patron of the arts, Block was also a keen amateur botanist. Block was in regular correspondence with other horticulturalists such as Jan Commelin.

== Career ==
For Block’s album, Maria Sibylla Merian, produced eighteen sets of plant studies. Joost van den Vondel, a friend and relative of Block, wrote about Block’s paper-cuttings.

== Bloemenboek ==
Bloemenboek was Block's collection of botanic watercolors.
