= Heusch =

Heusch is a surname. Notable people with the surname include:

- Jacob de Heusch, Dutch painter, nephew of Willem
- Luc de Heusch (1927–2012), Belgian filmmaker, writer, and anthropologist
- Paolo Heusch, Italian director and screenwriter
- Willem de Heusch, Dutch landscape painter and engraver
