= Weenix =

Weenix, Wenix, Weeninx is a surname. Notable people with the surname include:

- Jan Baptist Weenix (1621–1660), Dutch painter
- Jan Weenix (1640–1719), Dutch painter, son of Jan Baptist
- Maria Weenix (1697–1774), Dutch painter, daughter of Jan
