= Rochus van Veen =

Dutch Golden Age painter

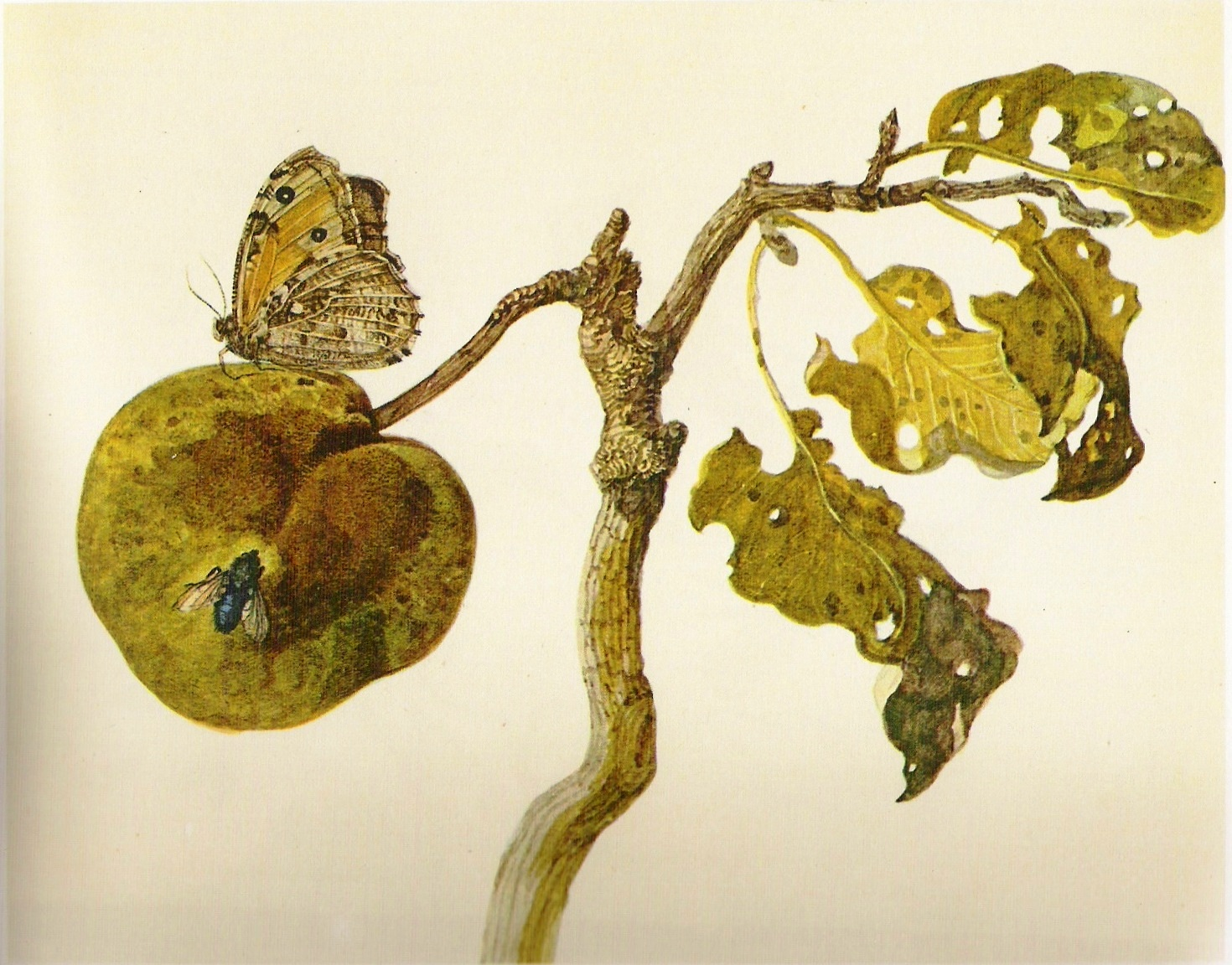
- Butterfly and small fly on appel, collection Teylers Museum
- Born: Rochus; 1630; Beverwijk
- Died: 1693 (aged 62–63); Beverwijk
- Known for: Painting
- Movement: Baroque

Rochus van Veen (1630–1693) was a Dutch Golden Age painter.

== Biography ==
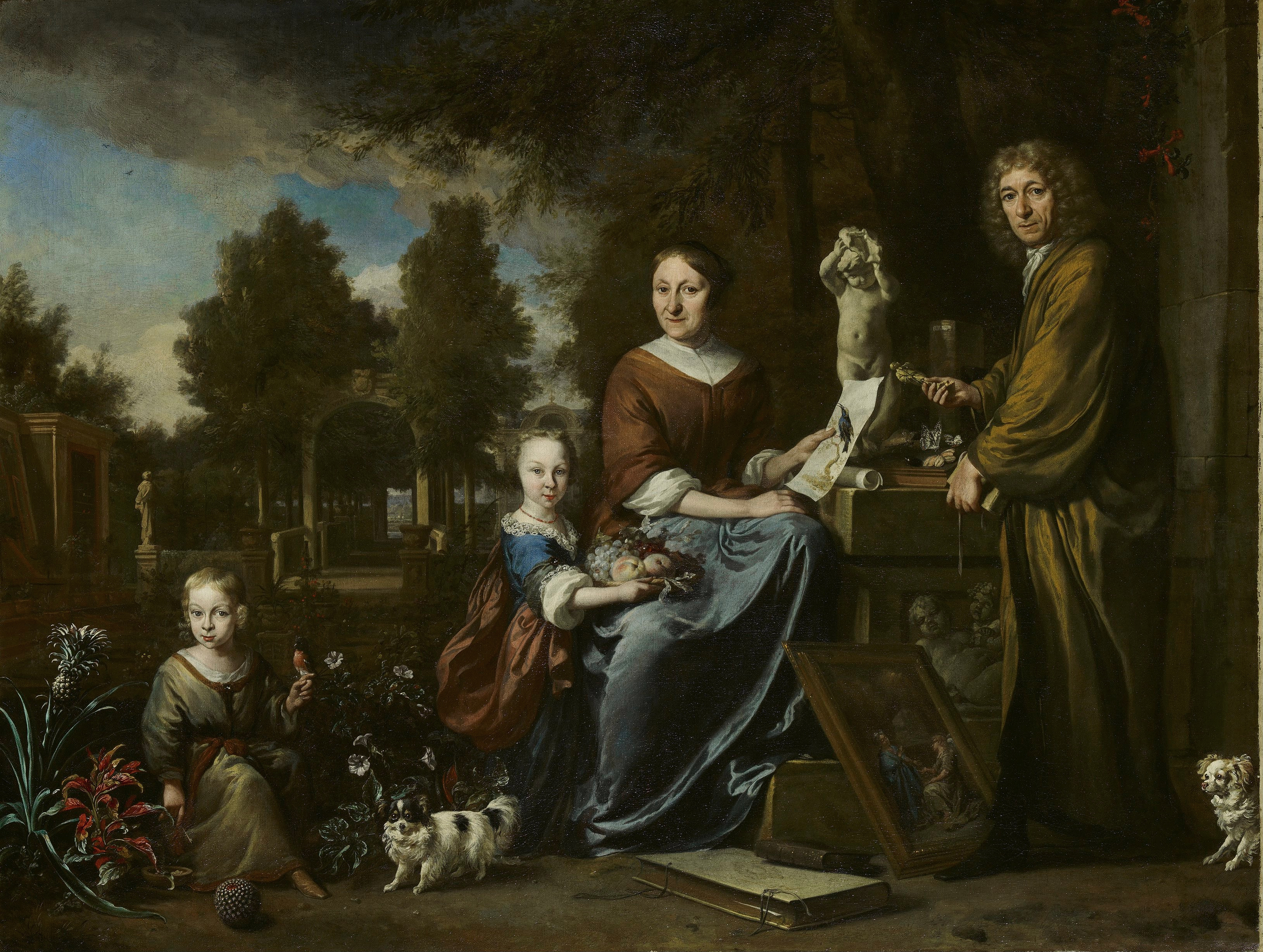
Agneta Block and her garden Flora Batava at Vijverhof, by Jan Weenix.

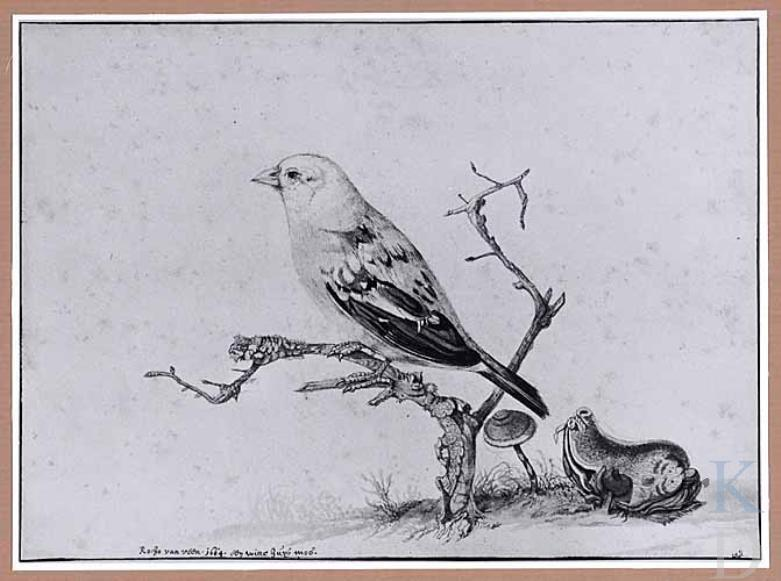
Watercolor of a finch on a branch that looks similar to the one in Agnes Block's hand in the Jan Weenix family portrait.

According to Houbraken, he followed in the artistic footsteps of his father Otto van Veen, who may have been his uncle. Rochus had two sons who also became painters. All three lived in Beverwijk and all specialized in painting watercolors of plants, birds and insects on paper and parchment. In 1706 their drawings, prints, and paintings were auctioned in Haarlem.

According to the RKD he was also known as Rocho. The RKD does not mention a relation to Otto van Veen, who painted historical allegories. Rochus painted watercolors for horticulturalists. He painted for Agnes Block's garden and one of his paintings resembles the one she holds in her hand in a family portrait by Jan Weenix.
