= Willem de Heusch =

Dutch painter

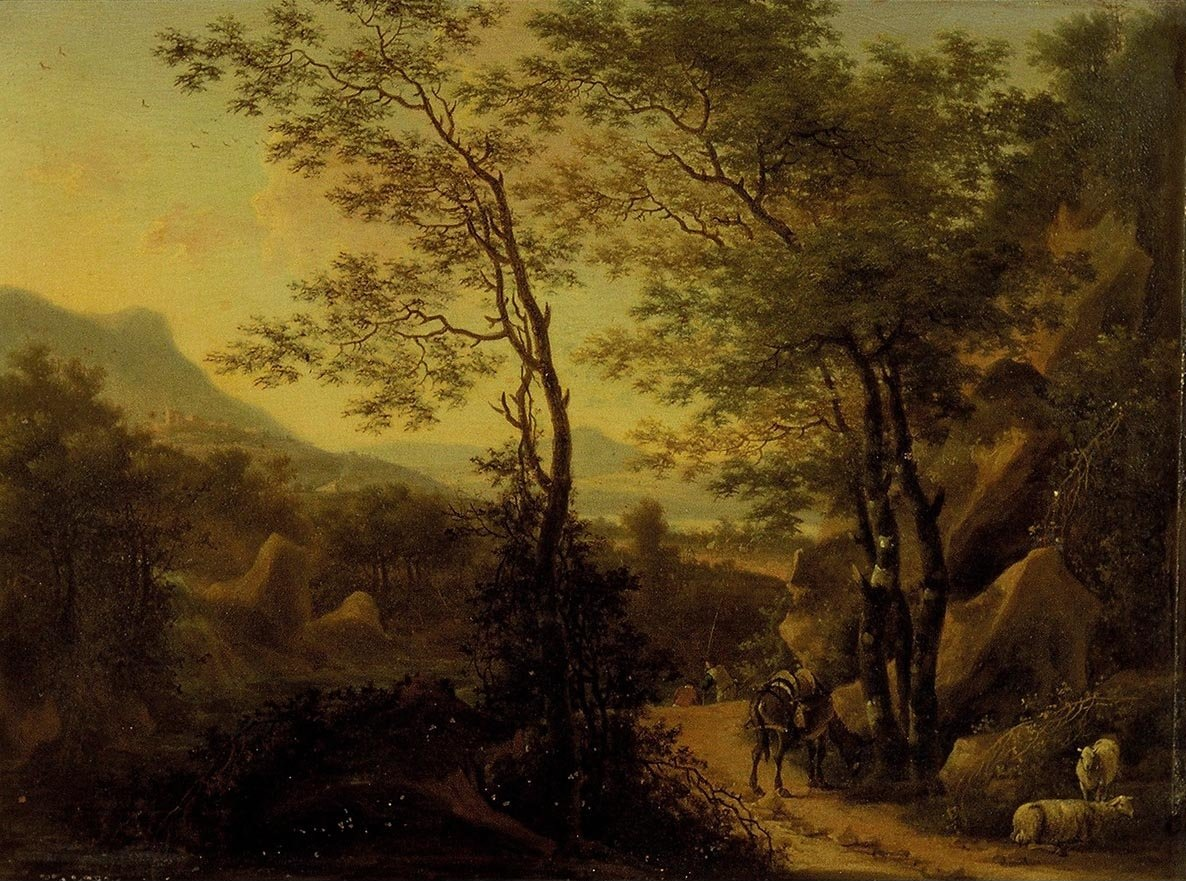
Mountainous Landscape in Italy

Willem (or Guilliam) de Heusch (c. 1625 – 9 March 1692 (buried)) was a Dutch landscape painter and engraver.

== Life ==
Very little is known about de Heusch's life and training. De Heusch was born and died in Utrecht. He likely studied with Jan Both as he later painted entirely in Both's style. Nothing certain is recorded of him except that he presided over the gild of Utrecht, whilst Cornelis Poelenburg, Jan Both and Jan Weenix formed the council of that body, in 1649.

One pupil of de Heusch in Utrecht was his nephew, Jacob de Heusch.

== Work ==
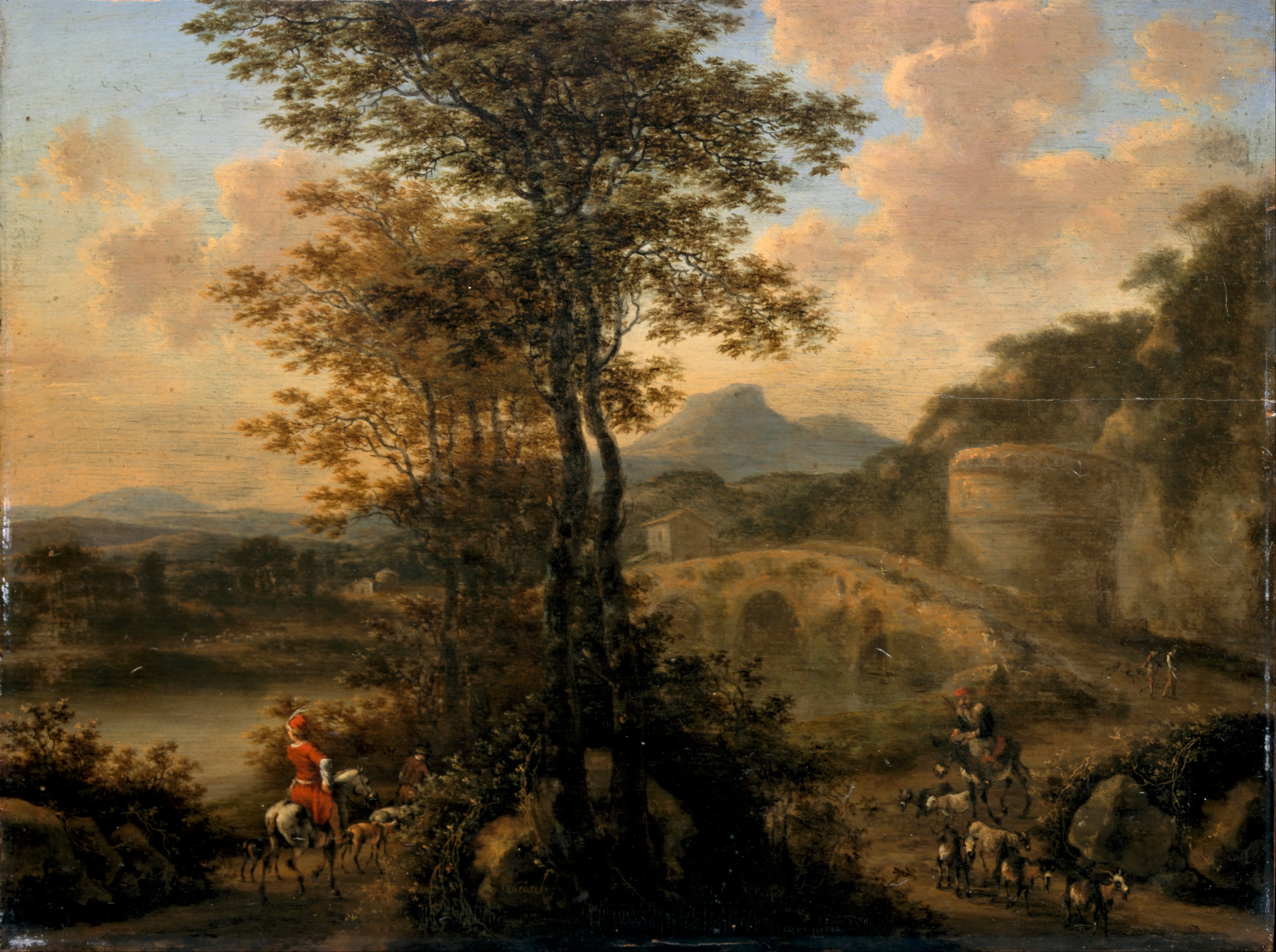
Italian River Landscape with Stone Bridge

His pictures are signed with the full name, beginning with a monogram combining a G (for Guilliam or Guglielmo), D and H Heusch's etchings, of which thirteen are known, are also in the character of those of Both.

Although the style of Heusch is identical with that of Both, it may be that the two masters during their travels in Italy fell under the influence of Claude Lorrain, whose Arcadian art they imitated. Heusch certainly painted the same effects of evening in wide expanses of country varied by rock formations and lofty thin-leaved arborescence as Both. There is little to distinguish one master from the other, except that of the two Both is perhaps the more delicate colourist. The gild of Utrecht in the middle of the 17th century was composed of artists who clung faithfully to each other. Poelemburg, who painted figures for Jan Both, did the same duty for Heusch. Sometimes Heusch sketched landscapes for the battlepieces of Molenaer.

The most important examples of Heusch are in the galleries of The Hague and Rotterdam, in the Belvedere at Vienna, the Städel in Frankfurt, the Louvre and the Israel Museum, Jerusalem.
