= Albert van Spiers =

Dutch Golden Age painter

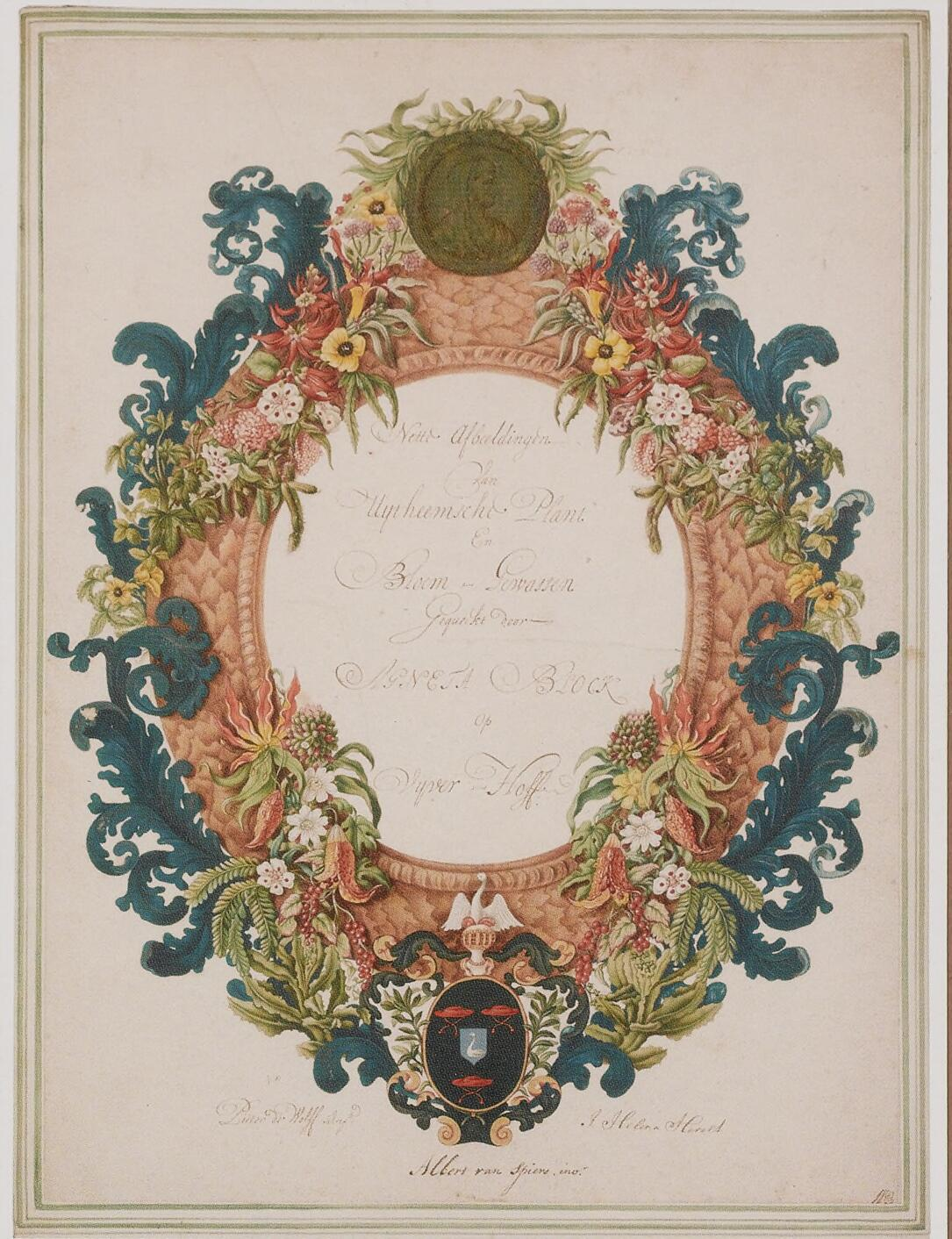
A floral frontispiece with a portrait medallion of Agnes Block

Albert van Spiers (baptized on 18 November 1665, Amsterdam – buried on 9 November 1718, Amsterdam), was a Dutch Golden Age painter. He is mainly known for interior decorations in the houses of the Canals of Amsterdam.

== Biography ==
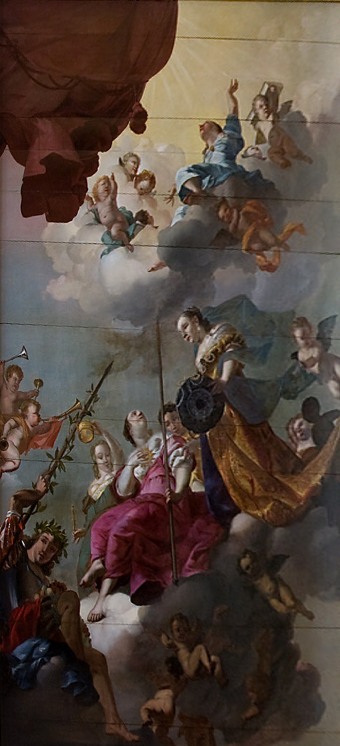
Ceiling decoration in Herengracht 497, restored in 2003 and presumed to be by the workshop of De Lairesse or Spiers.

According to Houbraken he travelled to Italy and joined the Bentvueghels with the nickname "Piramied". While in Italy he became friends with the Dutch painter Jacob de Heusch in Italy, who died from a fall after visiting the Spiers workshop in Amsterdam in 1701. According to Jan van Gool, he was a pupil of Gerard de Lairesse in Amsterdam. Other sources also mention Willem van Ingen as his teacher. After his apprenticeship he travelled to Rome and Venice before returning to Amsterdam to set up his own workshop in 1697, specializing in ceiling, over-the-door and over-the-mantelpiece decorations for the large patrician canal houses on the Herengracht and Keizersgracht.

According to the RKD he worked in Rome, Venice, and the Hague, and became a member of the Confrerie Pictura in 1699. His pupil was Jacob de Wit, who continued to make similar interior decorations.
