= Johannes van Bronckhorst =

Dutch Golden Age painter

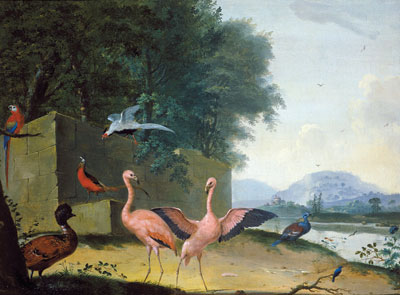
- An Assembly of Exotic Birds
- Born: Johannes Pietersz; 1648; Leiden
- Died: 1727 (aged 78–79); Hoorn
- Known for: Painting

Johannes van Bronckhorst (1648–1727) was a Dutch Golden Age painter.

== Life ==
According to Houbraken, he learned to paint from his father Pieter van Bronckhorst, who died when he was thirteen. The young Bronckhorst was sent to work as a pastry baker for a cousin in Haarlem. He drew as a hobby, and it remained a hobby until he moved back to Hoorn to get married.

== Work ==
He specialized in painting plants, birds, and insects. Although he remained a pastry baker, he did very well with his watercolours, which were published in engravings and commemorated with a poem by Johannes Vollenhove.

His pupils were Hendrik Graauw and Herman Henstenburgh. Both Bronckhorst and Herman Henstenburgh worked for the Mennonite art collector and horticulturalist Agnes Block for whom they painted animals, insects and plants from her garden.
