= Nicolaes de Vree =

Dutch Golden Age painter

Nicolaes de Vree (1645–1702) was a Dutch Golden Age painter.

== Biography ==
De Vree was born in Amsterdam. According to Houbraken, he painted landscapes, flowers, thistles, and herbs. Houbraken had a hard time finding information about his character, though there were many who were willing to discuss his works. This was because he was not a very social man, and after forming a friendship with Jan Luyken, he became, like Luyken, a follower of Behmenism, based on the writing of the German mystic Jakob Böhme.

He was a pupil of Jan Wijnants and he is known for his landscapes. In 1696 he moved to Alkmaar and in 1697 he became a member of the Alkmaar Guild of Saint Luke. He died in Alkmaar.

He was one of the painters who worked on the album of garden paintings for Agnes Block.
