= Hendrik Graauw =

Dutch painter

Hendrik Graauw (c.1627– 1693) was a Dutch Golden Age painter.

== Biography ==
Graauw was born in Hoorn. According to Houbraken, he first learned to paint from Pieter de Grebber in Haarlem. He then went to work for Jacob van Campen for eight years, until John Maurice, Prince of Nassau-Siegen returned from his travels and asked both van Campen and de Grebber to paint the cupola of the Huis ten Bosch. In 1648 he left for Rome where he copied many of the old masters and after three years he packed up his gear and returned North to Amsterdam, where he lived until the French invasion in 1672 (rampjaar), whereupon he evacuated to Hoorn. According to the RKD he worked on the Huis ten Bosch in the years 1645 - 1648 and was a pupil of Cesar van Everdingen and Johannes van Bronckhorst. He died in Alkmaar.
