= Jan Wijnants =

Dutch Golden Age painter

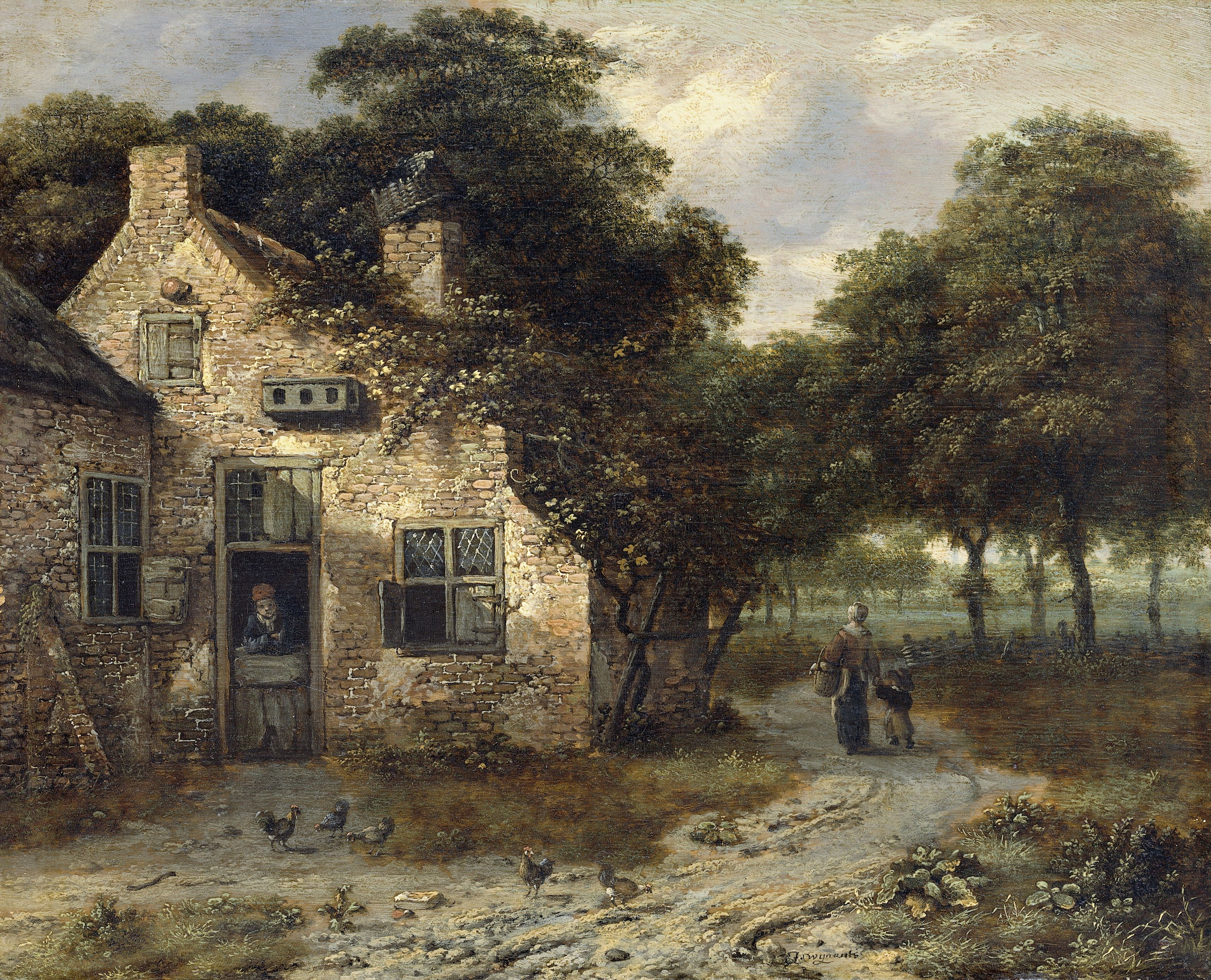
A Farmer's House, Rijksmuseum Amsterdam

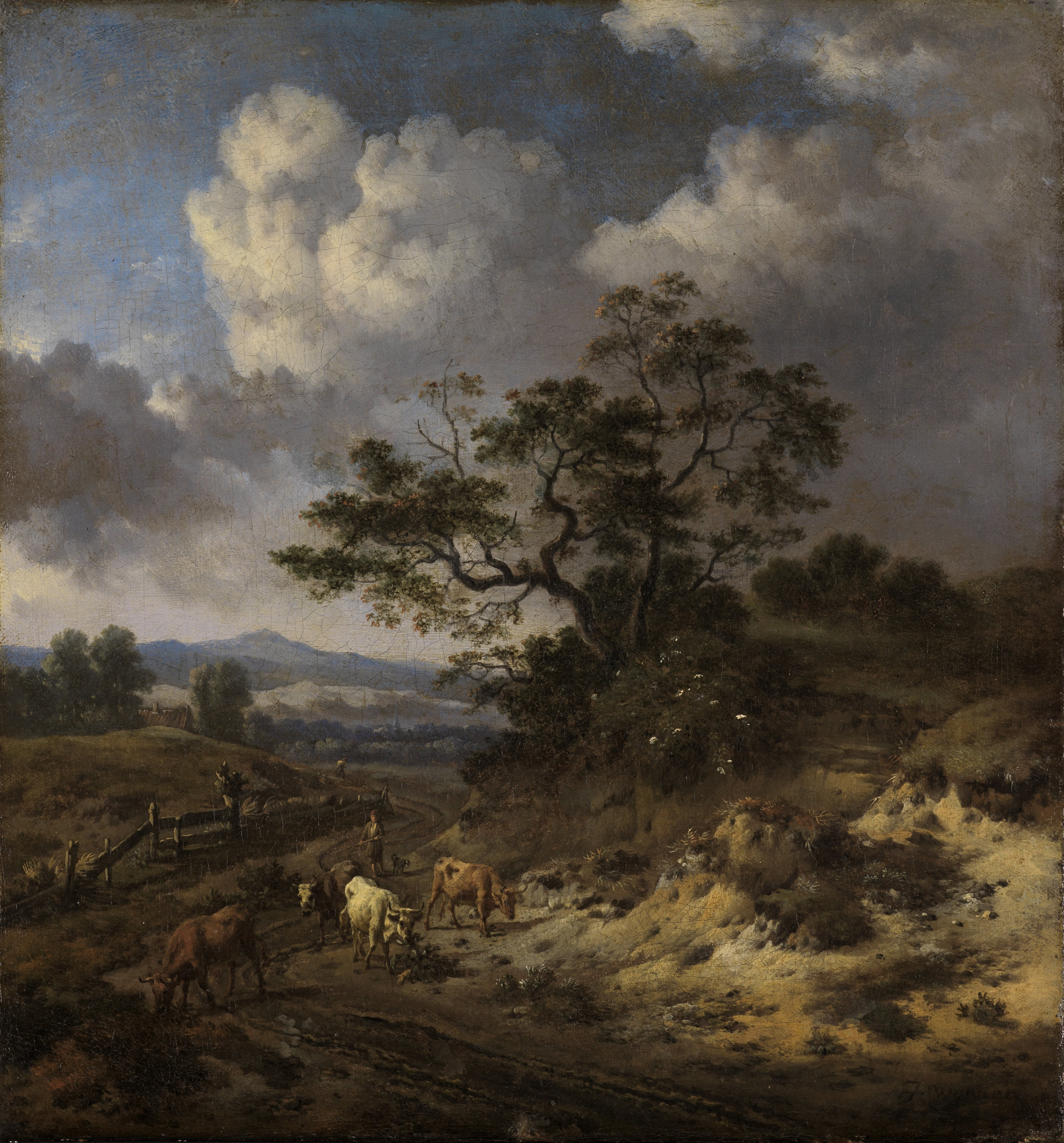
Hilly Landscape with Cows

Jan Jansz Wijnants (alternatively Wynants) (1632 – buried 23 January 1684) was a Dutch Golden Age painter.

== Biography ==
He was born in Haarlem, the son of a Catholic art dealer also named Jan Wijnants. After his mother's death, his father remarried Maria Jans van Stralen, widow of Jasper Jaspersz van Heemskerck, and mother of the painter Egbert Jaspersz van Heemskerck, making Wijnants and Van Heemskerck stepbrothers. Wijnants was active in Haarlem until 1660, after which he moved to Amsterdam. He died in Amsterdam.

Wijnants is primarily known for his Italianate landscapes and paintings featuring topography. The painters Nicolaes de Vree and Adriaen van de Velde trained in his studio and his style later had influence on the English artist, Thomas Gainsborough, the German artist Wilhelm von Kobell, and the Dutch artists Anthonie van Borssom and Willem Buytewech.

== Works ==
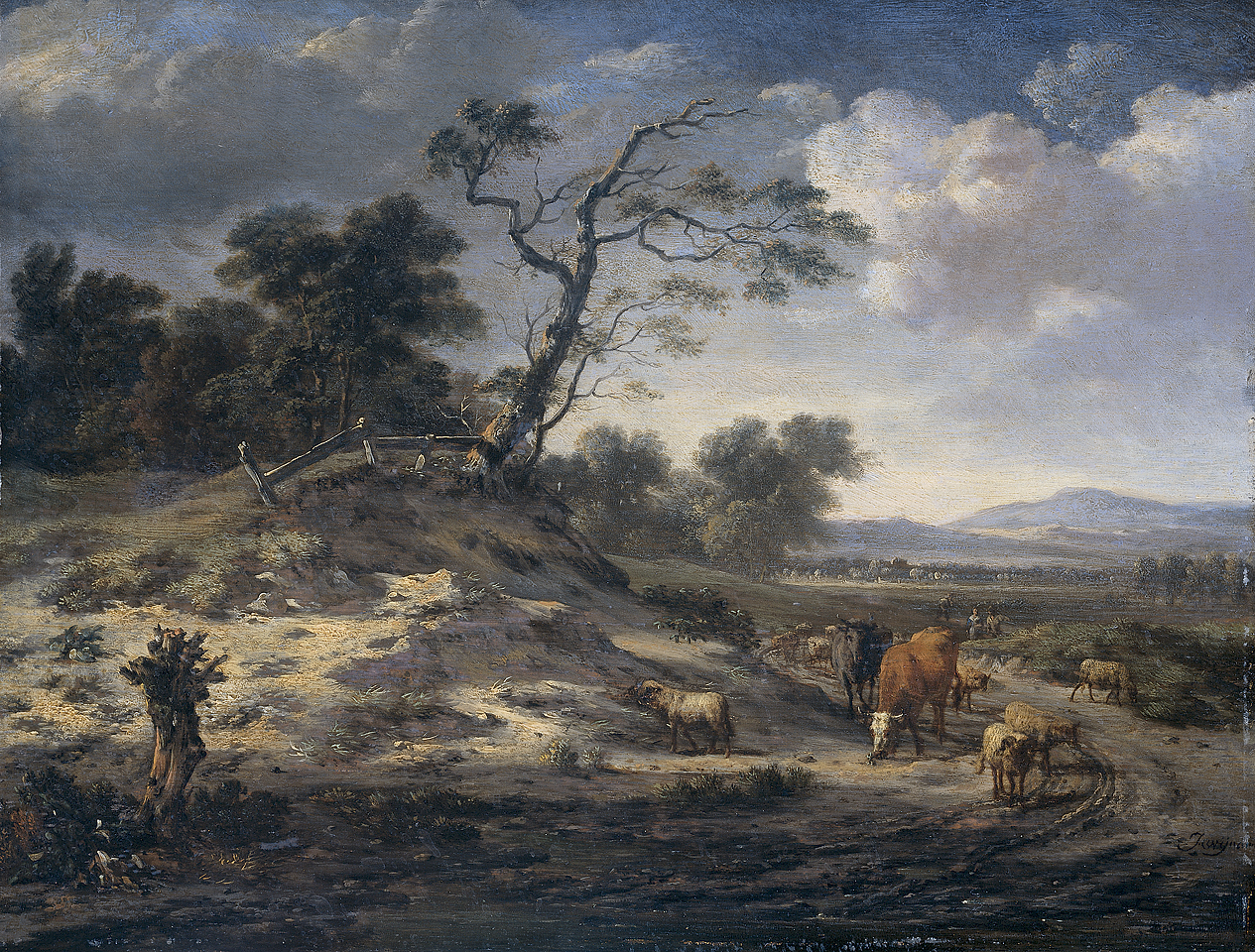
Landscape with a road

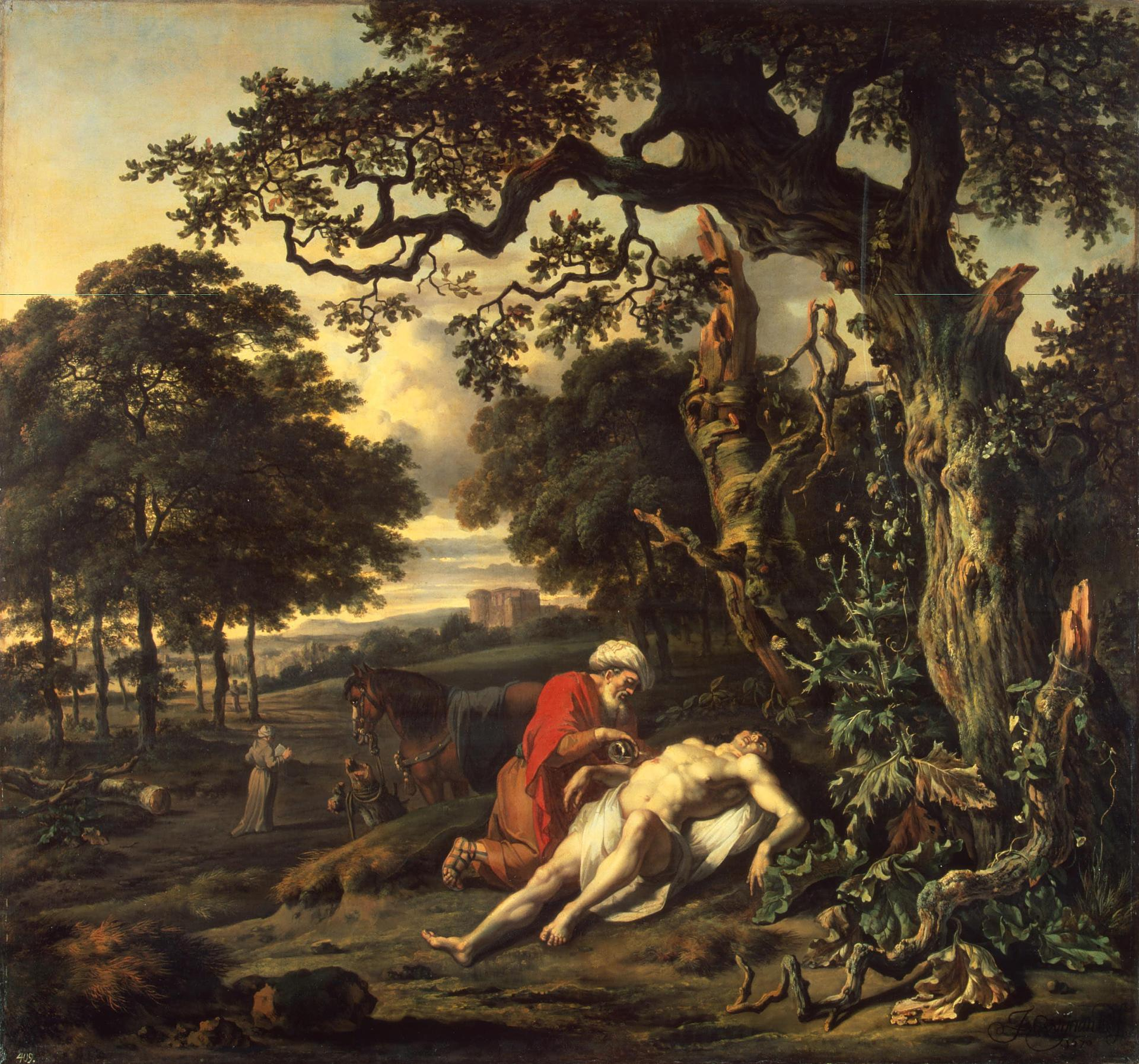
Parable of the Good Samaritan

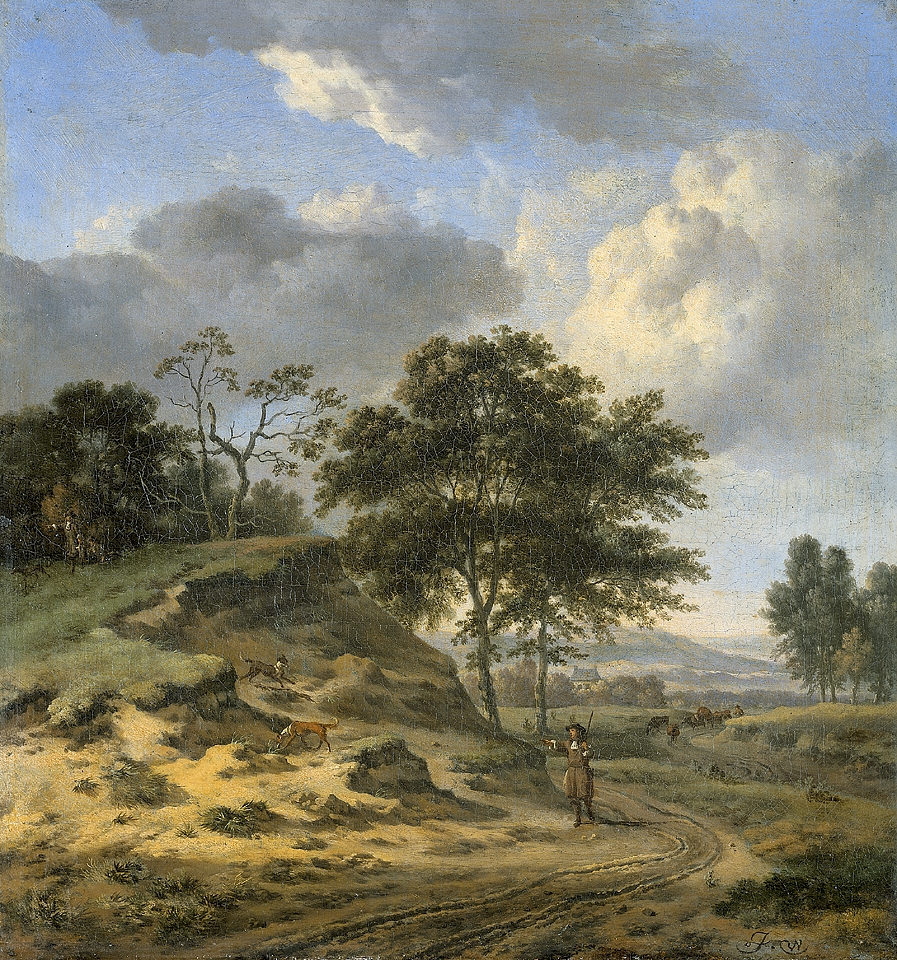
Landscape with two hunters

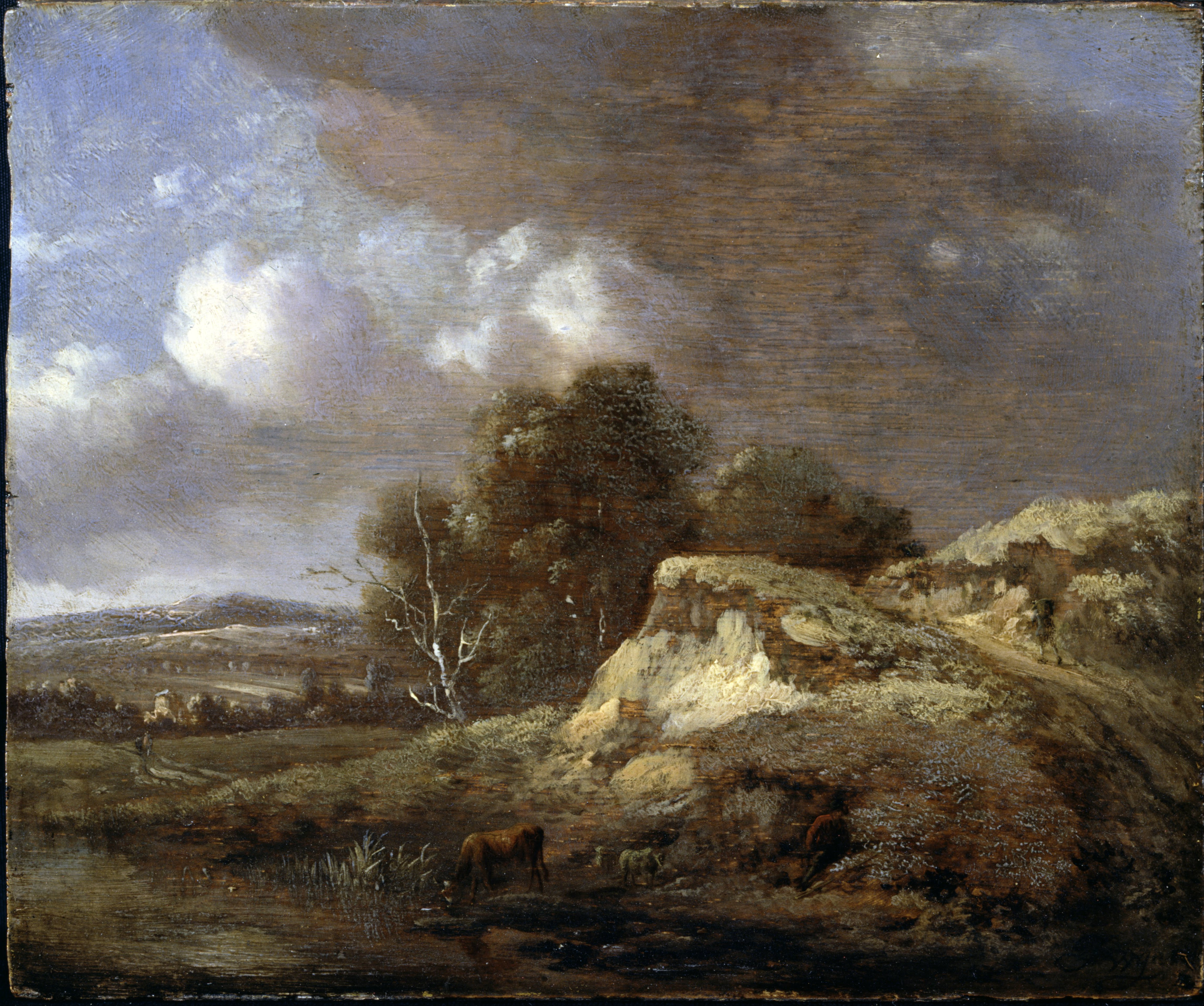
Landscape with Cow drinking

== Links ==
- 46 artworks by or after Jan Wijnants at the Art UK site
- Jan Wijnants profile @ Artnet.com
- Biodata, cartage.org
- Media related to Jan Wijnants at Wikimedia Commons
