= Maria Weenix =

Dutch artist (1697–1774)

Maria Weenix (1697–1774) was an 18th-century painter from the Dutch Republic.

== Biography ==
According to the RKD she was the daughter of Jan Weenix, who taught her to paint. She is known in the literature as "Juffrouw Weeniks" and was admired in her own time for flower still lifes. She accompanied her father to the court of Johann Wilhelm, Elector Palatine where she came into contact with the works of the flower painters Rachel Ruysch, Adriana Spilberg, and Jacoba Maria van Nickelen. She died in Amsterdam.

== Literature ==
- Anke A. Van Wagenberg-Ter Hoeven (2018) Jan Baptist Weenix & Jan Weenix: The Paintings, Zwolle: Waanders & De Kunst. ISBN 9789462621596
