= Jacob de Heusch =

Dutch painter (1657–1701)

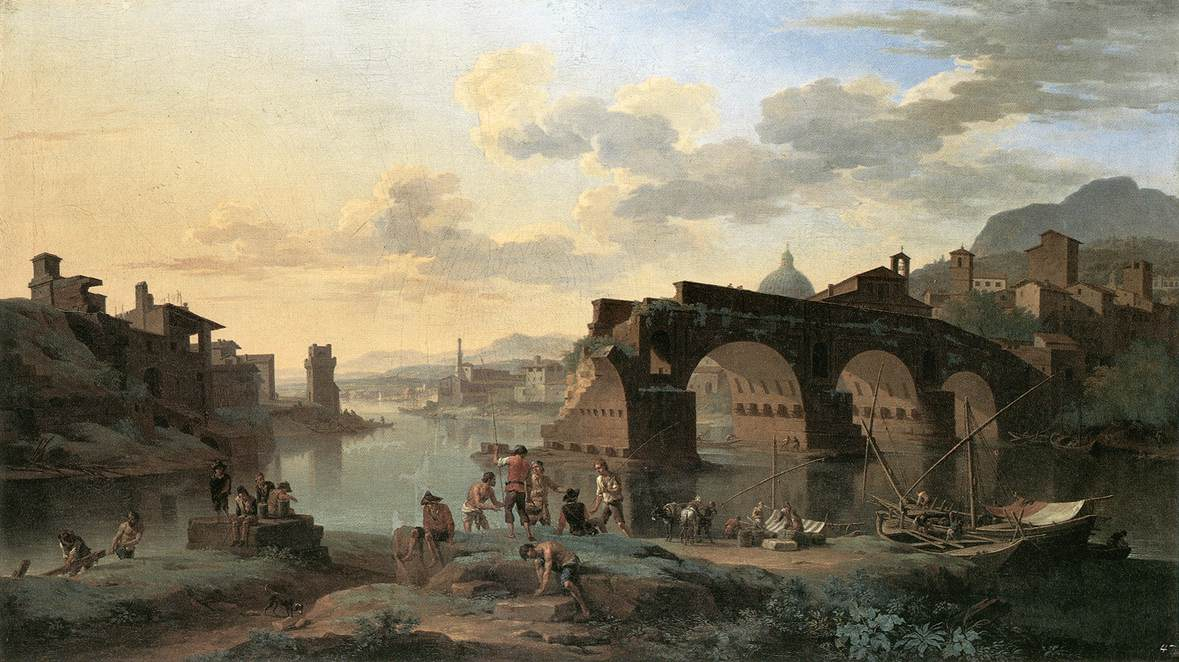
River View with the Ponte Rotto by Jacob de Heusch, from 1696

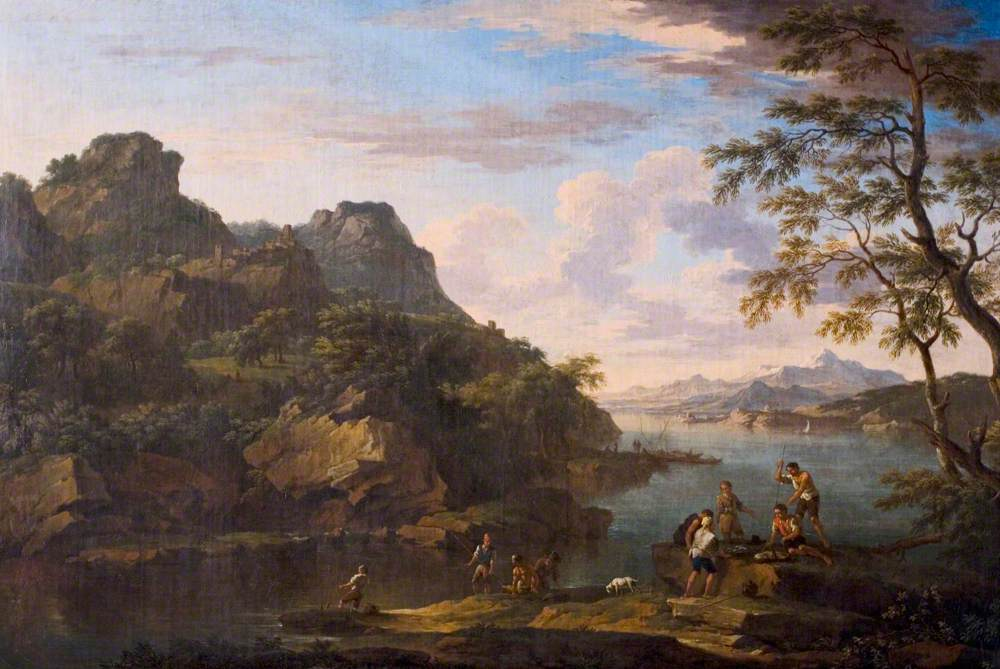
Classical Landscape with Figures, by Jacob de Heusch

Jacob de Heusch (November 23, 1656 (bapt.) - May 8, 1701), was a Dutch painter. He was Willem de Heusch's nephew, signing like his uncle, with an initial monogram combining J, D, and H (substituting an initial J for the initial G of his uncle's Guglielmo.

== Life ==
De Heusch was born in Utrecht. He learnt drawing from his uncle, and travelled to Rome in 1675, where he acquired friends and patrons for whom he executed pictures after his return. According to Houbraken, he became a member of the Bentvueghels and made trips to Venice and other cities with friends, painting in the manner of Salvator Rosa. After several years in Italy he returned to Utrecht, where he lived with his brother, a postmaster. He continued painting, but was not highly productive, and most of his work was sent to Italy. He enjoyed making pleasure trips, and in 1698 he travelled to Berlin with his Bentvueghel friend Johan Teyler, and it was on his final pleasure trip to Amsterdam to visit other Bent friends Albert van Spiers and Jan van der Keere, that he vomited blood and died presumably of injuries he had suffered a bit earlier in a fall from a carriage.

According to the RKD his Bent nickname was 'Afdruk' or 'Copia', and he was registered in Rome in 1686, 1691 and 1692.

Like his relative, Jacob was an "Arcadian" and an imitator of Jan Both. He chiefly painted Italian harbour views. His pictures are now scarce. Two of his canvases, the "Ponte Rotto" at Rome, in the Brunswick Gallery, and a lake harbour with shipping in the Lichtenstein collection at Vienna, are dated 1696.

A harbour with a tower and distant mountains, in the Belvedere at Vienna, was executed in 1699. Other examples may be found in English private galleries, in the Hermitage of St Petersburg and the museums of Rouen and Montpellier.
