= Herman Henstenburgh =

Dutch painter

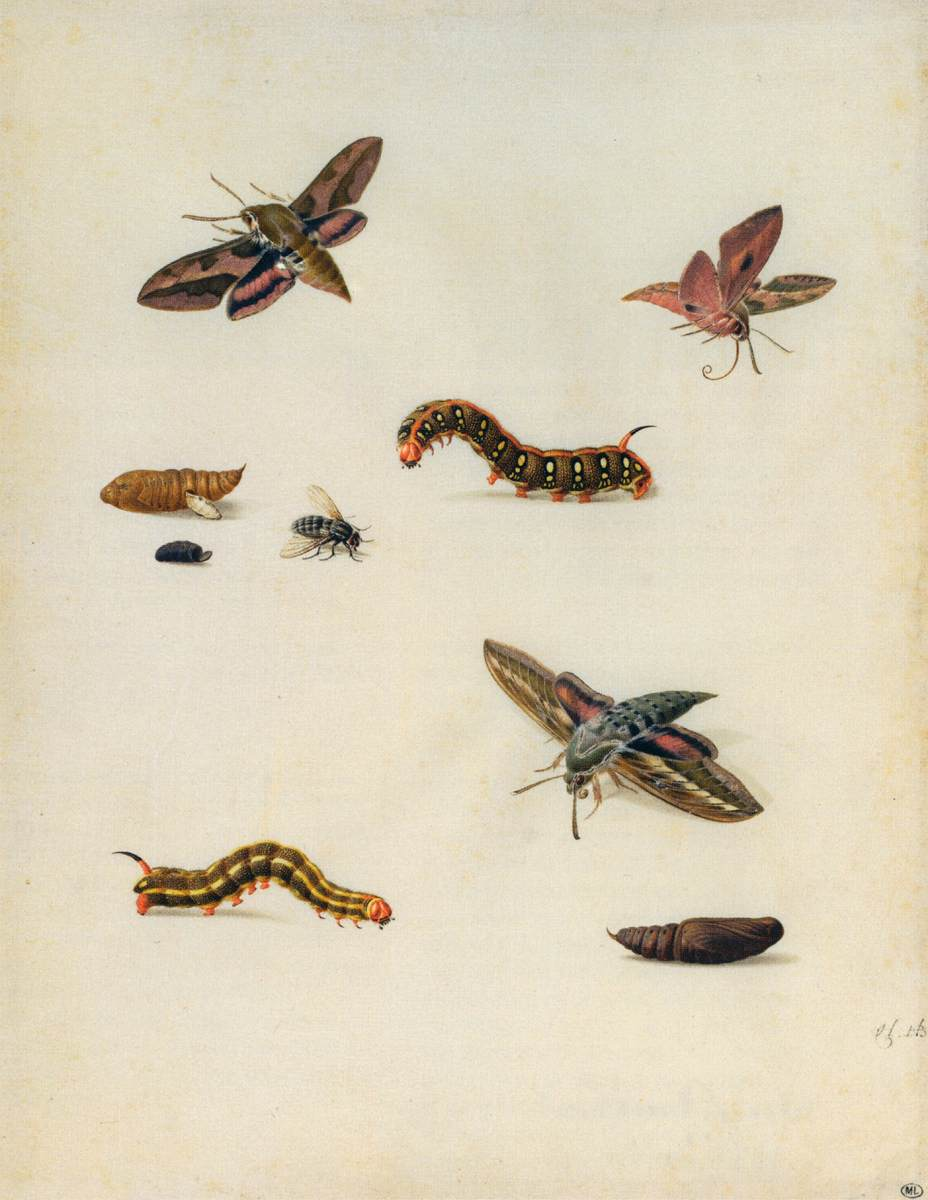
Insects, gouache and varnish on vellum

Herman Henstenburgh (1667–1726) was an 18th-century painter from the Dutch Republic.

== Biography ==
He was born and died in Hoorn. According to Johan van Gool he was very good at copying prints and copied the watercolours of Pieter Holstein, which were so good that his parents let him become a pupil of Johannes Bronkhorst in 1683. Bronckhorst was able to live by his paintings, but supplemented his income with his work on the side as pastrybaker until his death, and Henstenburgh clearly learned this business from him as well, because he took over this business when Bronckhorst died. His portrait was drawn in the album of Joanna Koerten by Nicolaas Verkolje with a poem by Feitema.

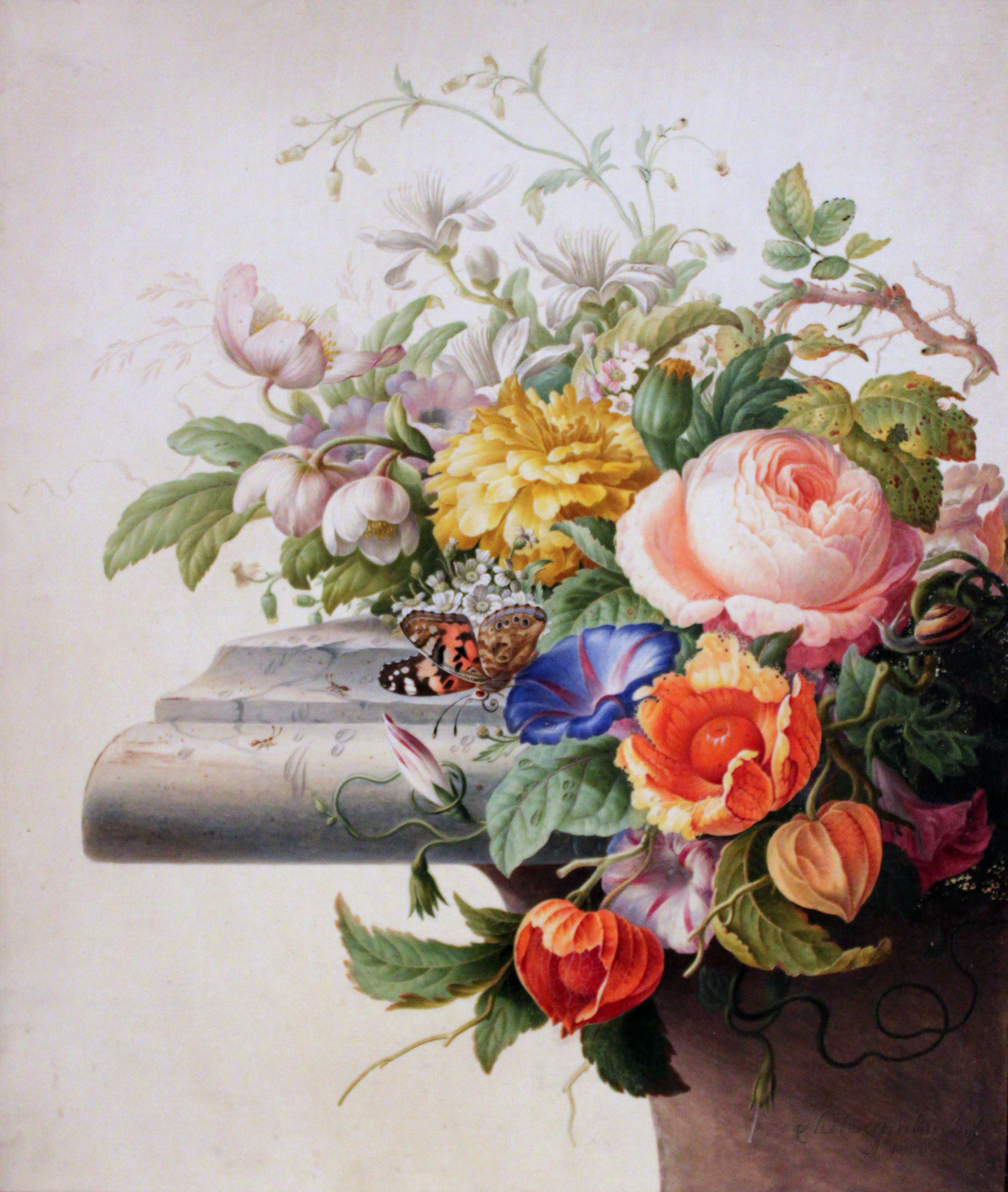
Bouquet, 1700, Städelsches Kunstinstitut

According to the RKD he was a registered pupil of Johannes Bronckhorst and is known for fruit and flower still lifes, with a specialty in insects and birds.
