= Jan Weenix =

Dutch painter (1640–1719)

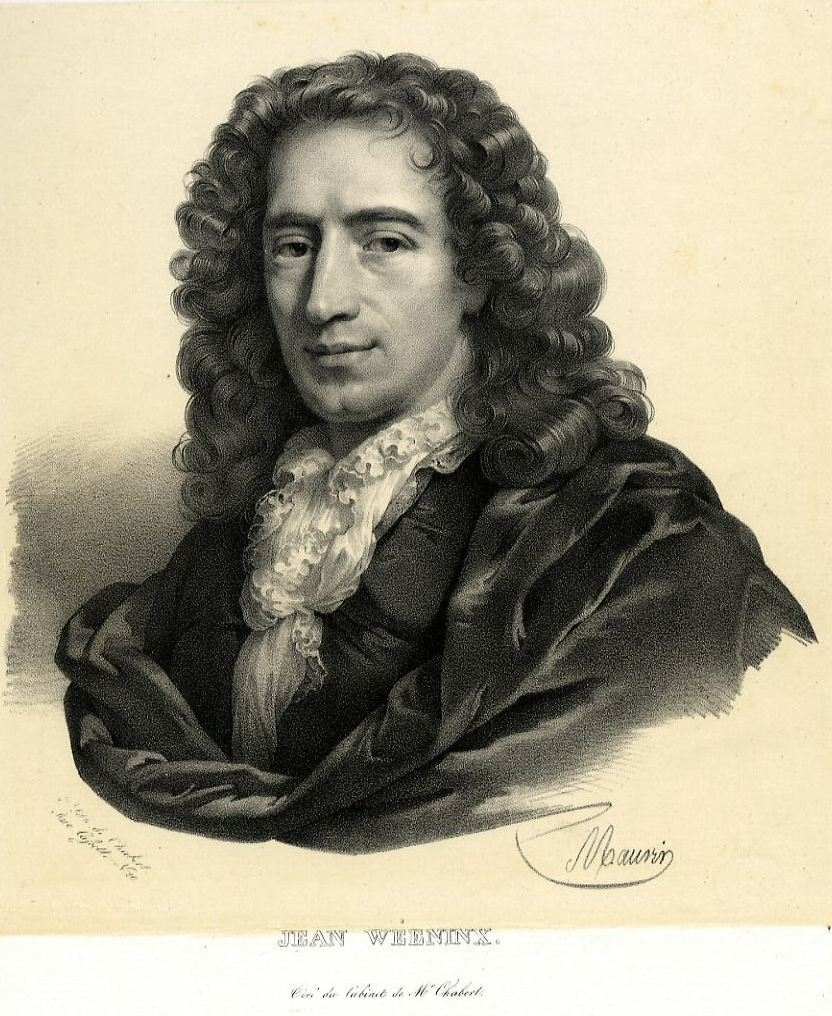
- Jan Weenix, lithograph by Antoine Maurin (1783-1860)
- Born: 1640/1641; Amsterdam, Dutch Republic
- Died: September 1719; Amsterdam, Dutch Republic
- Occupation: Painter
- Relatives: Jan Baptist Weenix (Father)
- Writing career
- Period: Late Baroque
- Subject: Hunting Still Life

Jan Weenix or Joannis Wenix (between 1641/1649 – 19 September 1719 (buried)) was a Dutch painter. He was trained by his father, Jan Baptist Weenix, together with his cousin Melchior d'Hondecoeter. Like his father, he painted various subjects, but is mostly known for his paintings of dead game and hunting scenes. Many paintings in this genre were formerly ascribed to the elder Weenix, but are now generally considered to be the work of the son.

== Life ==
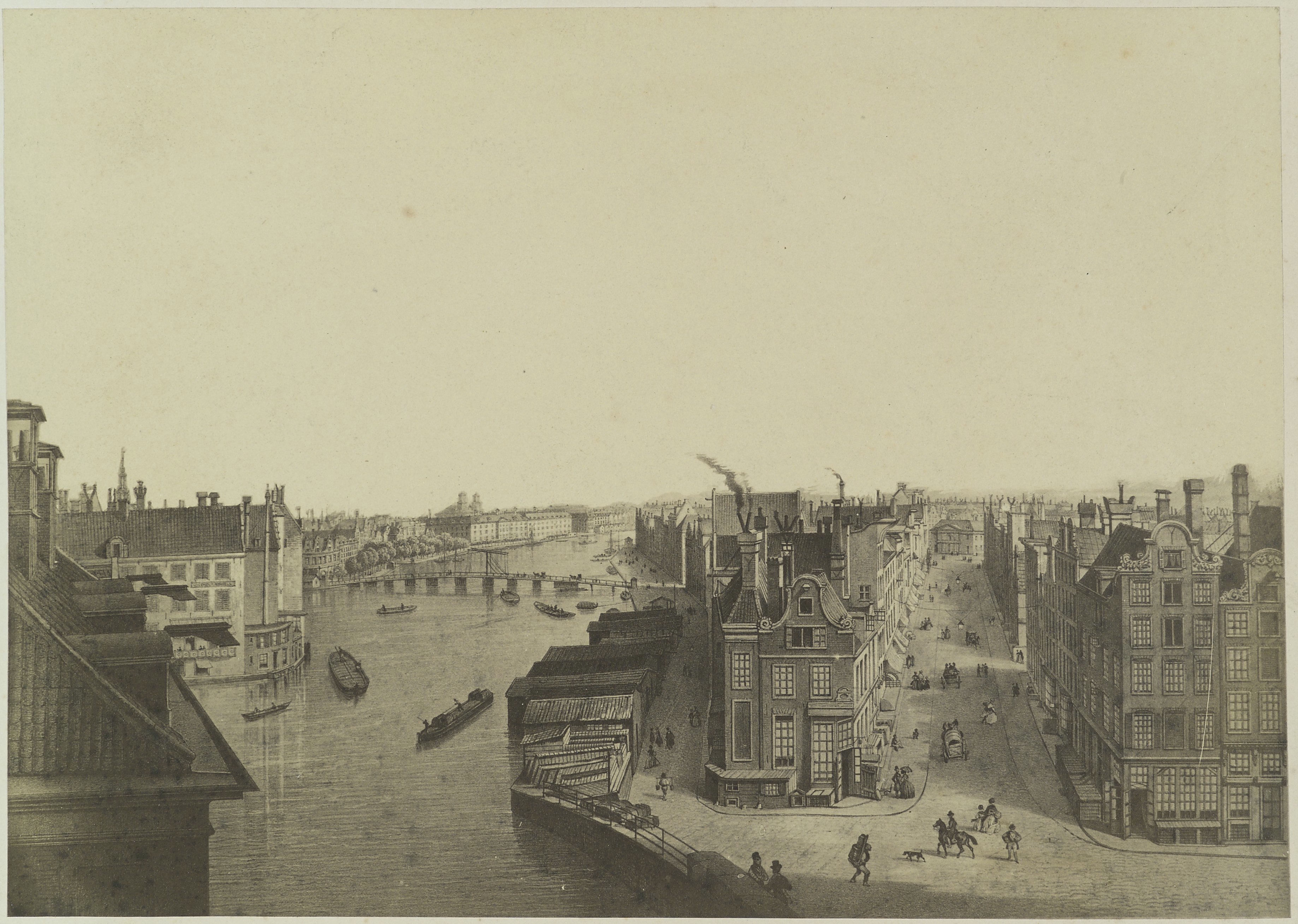
The "Binnen Amstel", Weenix lived at the waterfront behind the house in the middle.

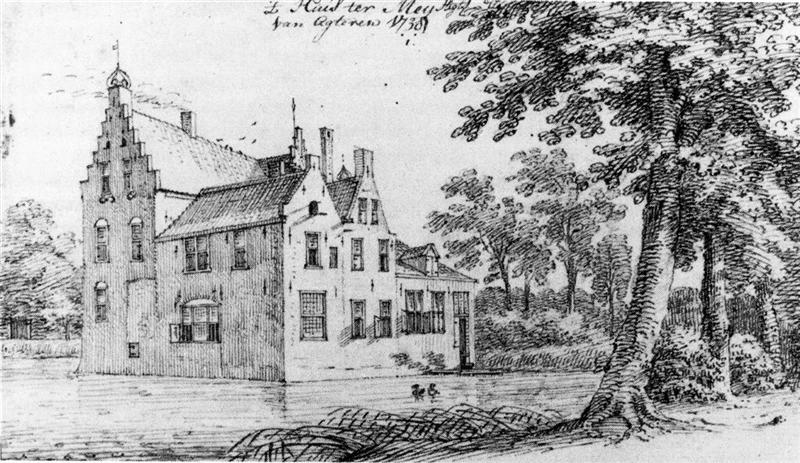
Castle Ter Mey, Vleuten, 1738 drawing by Hendrik Spilman

Jan Weenix was born in Amsterdam according to his notice of marriage in 1679 but his date of birth is not exactly known as the baptismal record of this catholic church did not survive. Between 1643 and 1647 his father (Jan Baptist) worked in Italy, but the family moved to Utrecht around 1649. His father subsequently moved into a castle near Vleuten, but died rather young in 1659.

By the age of twenty Jan Weenix rivalled and later surpassed his father in breadth of treatment and richness of colour. Jan Weenix was a member of the Utrecht guild of painters in 1664 and 1668.

Marriage and children

In 1679, Jan Weenix married the 20-year-old Pieternella Backers (he told the schepen he was "around thirty"). Between 1680 and 1700, the couple had 13 children who were baptized in a hidden church. At least four were sons –Jan Baptista (1680-), Willem Ignatius (1690-1764), Jacobus (1693-), Nicolaes Andreas (1699-1757) – and two were daughters: Sara and Maria Weenix (1697–1774).

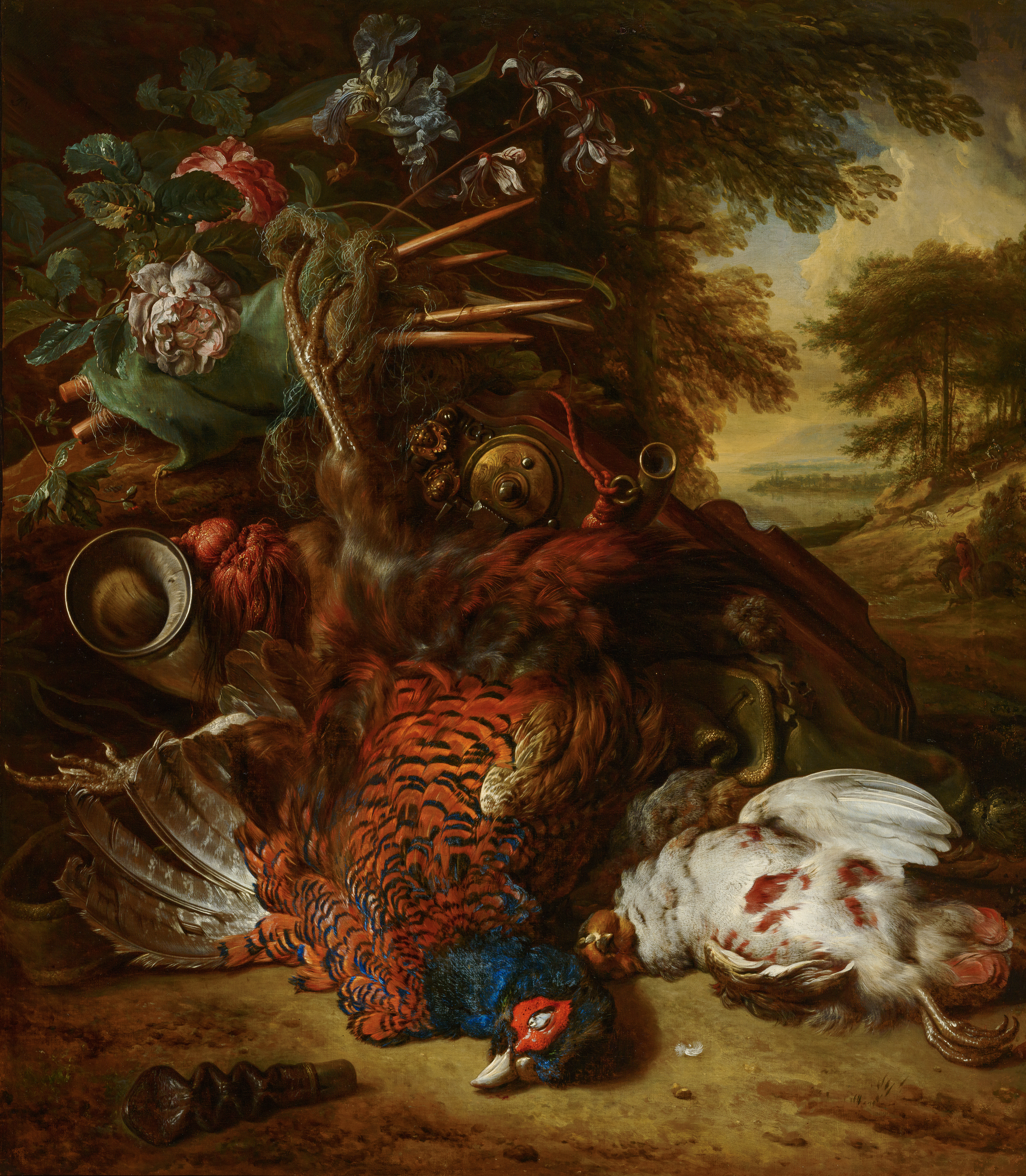
Hunting Still Life (ca. 1708) oil on canvas, 79.2 x 69.5 cm., Mauritshuis

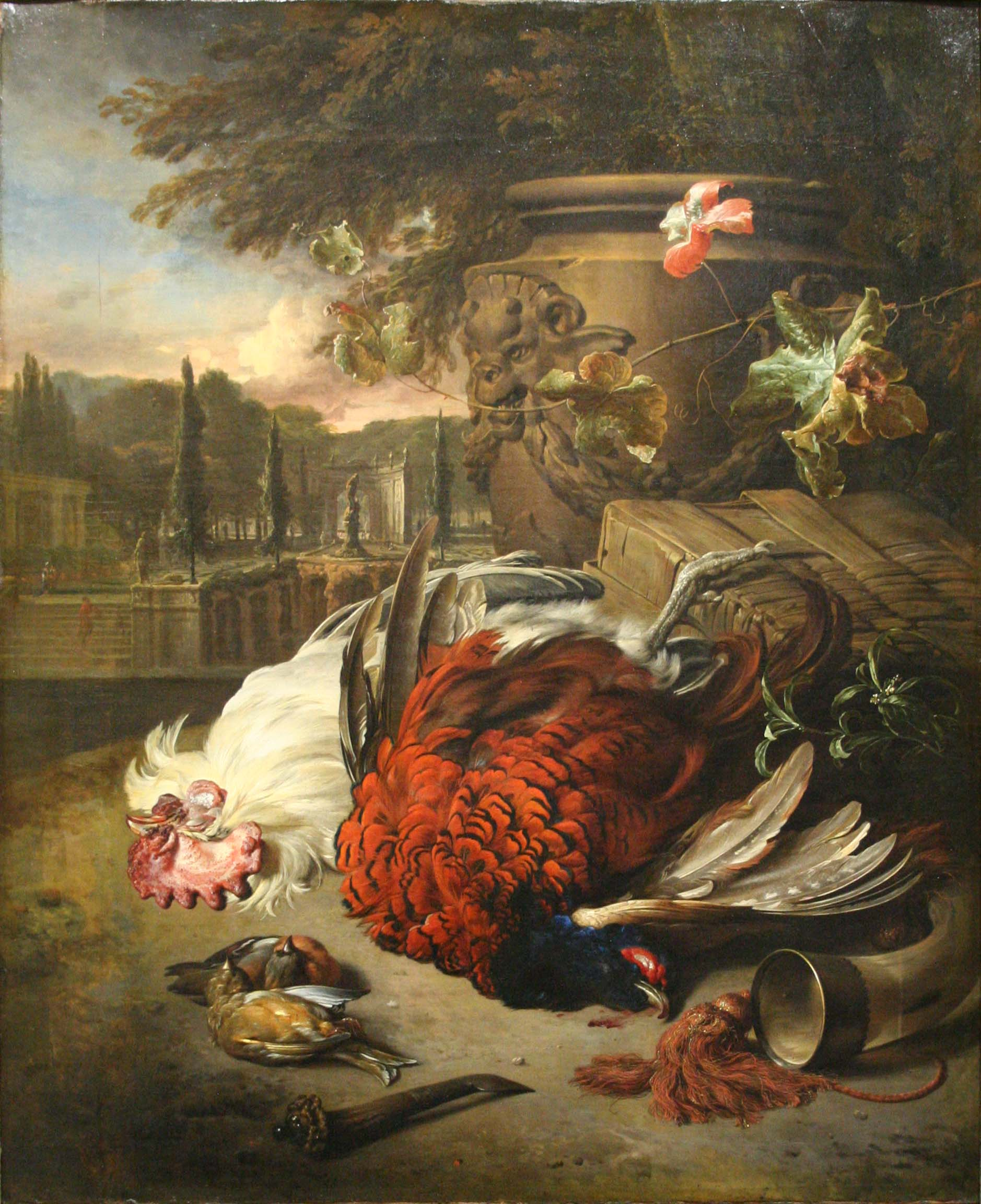
Game and Hunting Weapons (ca. 1675-1700), oil on canvas, Musée Fabre

In 1697 he painted a portrait of Peter the Great, visiting the Republic to study shipbuilding, science, and the art of fortification building. In Amsterdam, Weenix was frequently employed to decorate private houses with wall-paintings on canvas.

He painted five fixed paintings or wallpaper on canvas for Jacob de Granada; these became very popular in the second half of the 18th century when nature and Rousseau were fashionable and copied. The paintings survived in the house until 1922. Then the enormous "paintings" were sold before an auction to William Randolph Hearst in a private arrangement. After Hearst went bankrupt, the paintings were dispersed; one is in the National Galleries of Scotland in Edinburgh, two are in the Hotel Carlyle in New York, one has been in the Allen Memorial Art Museum since 1953 and one is lost.

Between 1702 and 1712 Weenix was occupied with an important series of twelve large hunting pictures for the Elector Palatine Johann Wilhelm's castle of Bensberg, near Cologne. Also Eglon van der Neer, Rachel Ruysch, Adriaen van der Werff had a very good relationship with the court, being paid well or knighted as ridder and probably meeting an international crowd of artists and musicians. The treasury was empty when Jan Wellem, as he was called in Düsseldorf, died. Most of this collection is now at the Munich Gallery.

Weenix' pupils were his daughter Maria Weenix and Dirk Valkenburg. Jan Weenix lived most of his life in a house across the Mint Tower and was buried in Nieuwezijds Kapel a nearby catholic church on the Rokin. His widow and daughters stayed in the masonry business, selling stones and tiles.

== Work ==
Johann Wolfgang von Goethe was impressed by the treatment of animals in Weenix pictures which he saw in Munich. He devoted a poem to Weenix's technique, in which he stated that Weenix equaled and even surpassed nature in his treatment of animal textures such as hair, feathers and claws.

Many of his best works are to be found in English private collections. The National Gallery, London has two paintings, including "A Deerhound with Dead Game and Implements of the Chase", while the Wallace Collection (also in London) has thirteen paintings, including "Flowers on a Fountain with a Peacock."

Outside the United Kingdom, Jan Weenix is well represented in the galleries of Amsterdam, The Hague, Haarlem, Rotterdam, Berlin, Lisbon and Paris. A medium-sized Weenix, "Still Life with Dead Game", hangs in the dining room of the Filoli estate in California. A certain "Still Life with Hunting Trophies" hangs in the Ackland Art Museum, Chapel Hill, NC, and a large "Peacock with Hunting Trophies" hangs in the Museu Calouste Gulbenkian. "Boy with Toys, Pet Monkey and a Turkey" is in the Kresge Art Museum. "Still Life with Dead Hare" in the Museum of Western and Oriental Art in Kyiv.

== Gallery ==
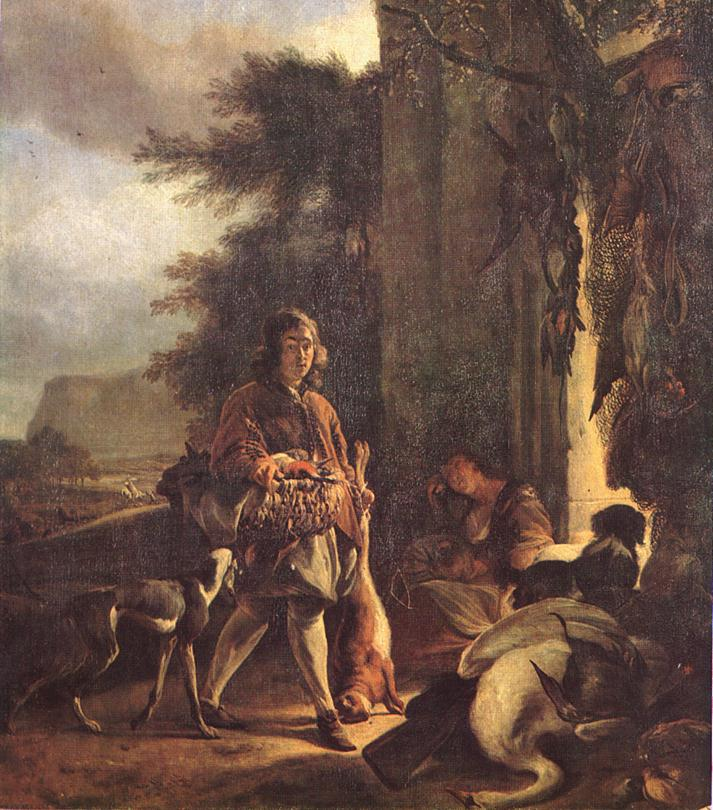
After the Hunt (1665), oil on panel, 44.7 × 34.5 cm., Alte Pinakothek

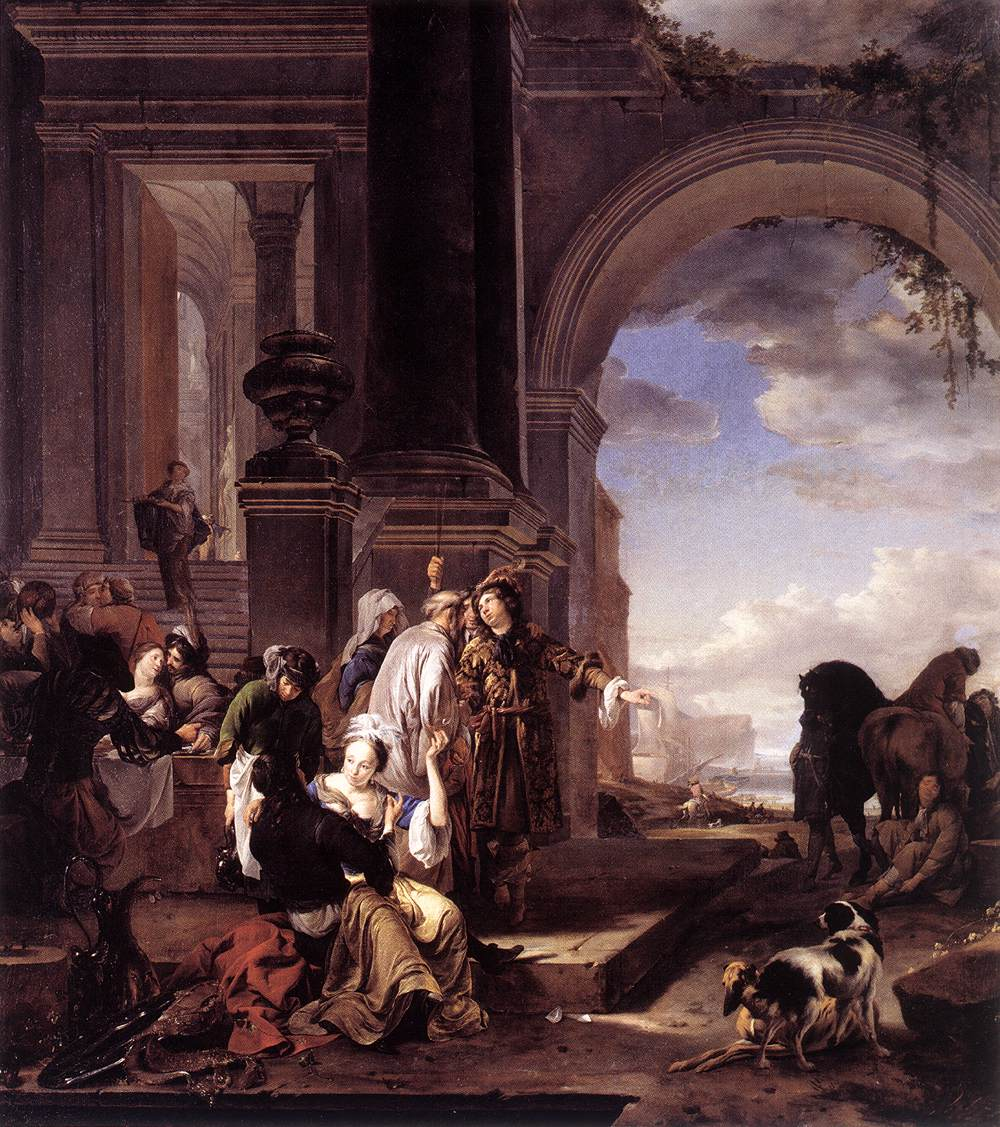
The Prodigal Son (1668), oil on canvas, 111 x 99 cm., Residenzgalerie

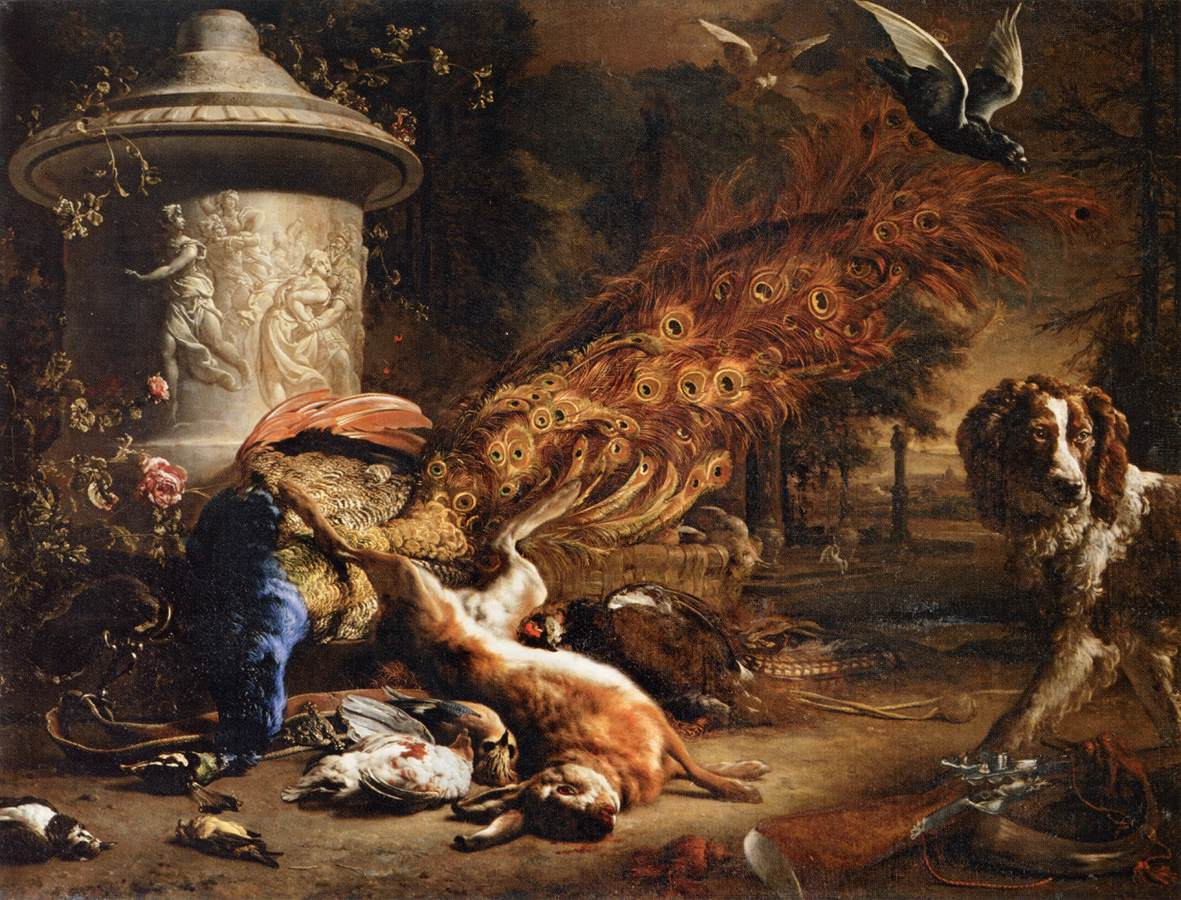
Still-Life with a Peacock and a Dog (1669), oil on canvas, 143.5 x 187 cm., Louvre

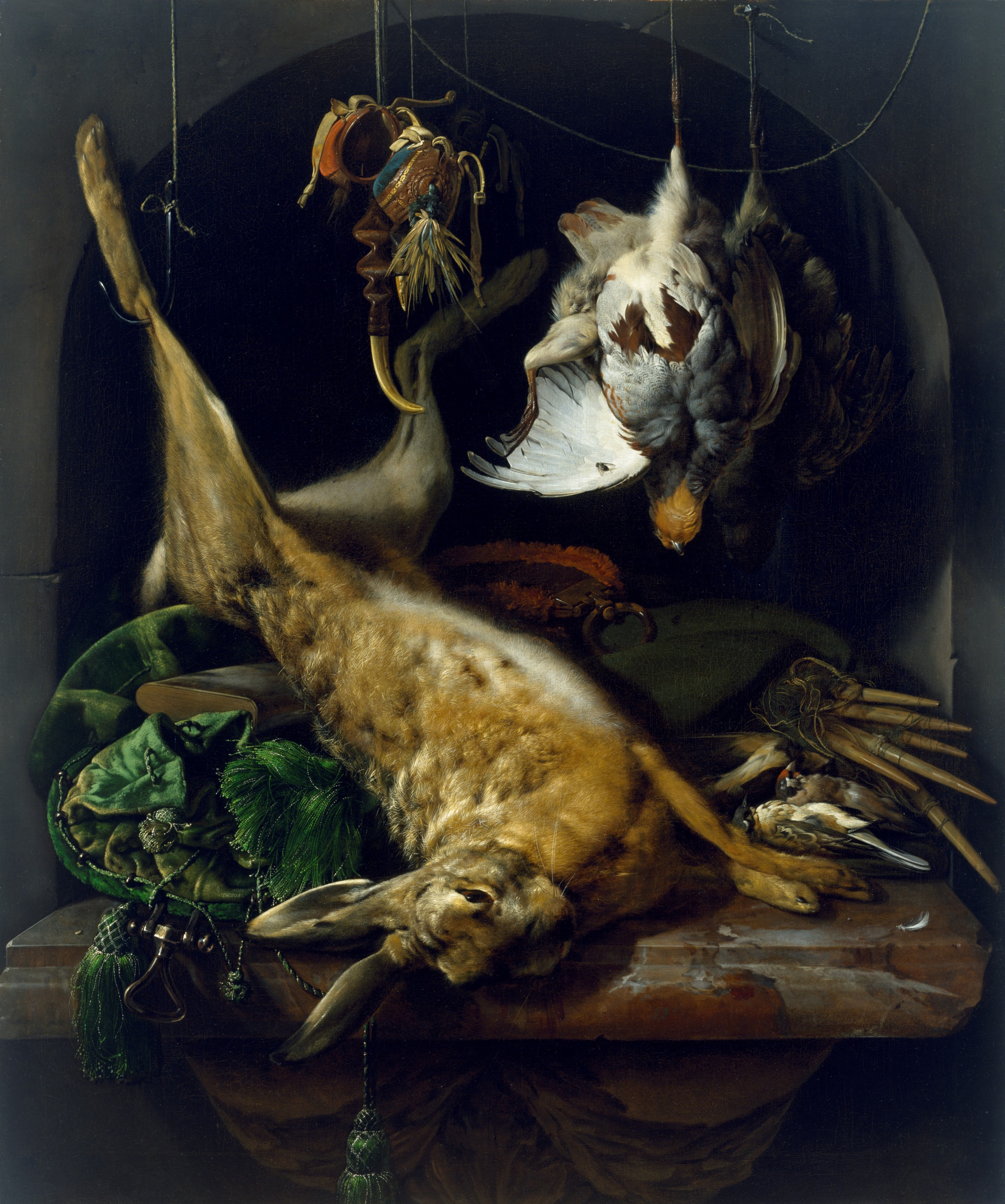
Dead Hare, Partridges, and Other Birds in a Niche (ca. 1675), oil on canvas, 105.5 x 88.5 Cm., Museum of Fine Arts, Houston

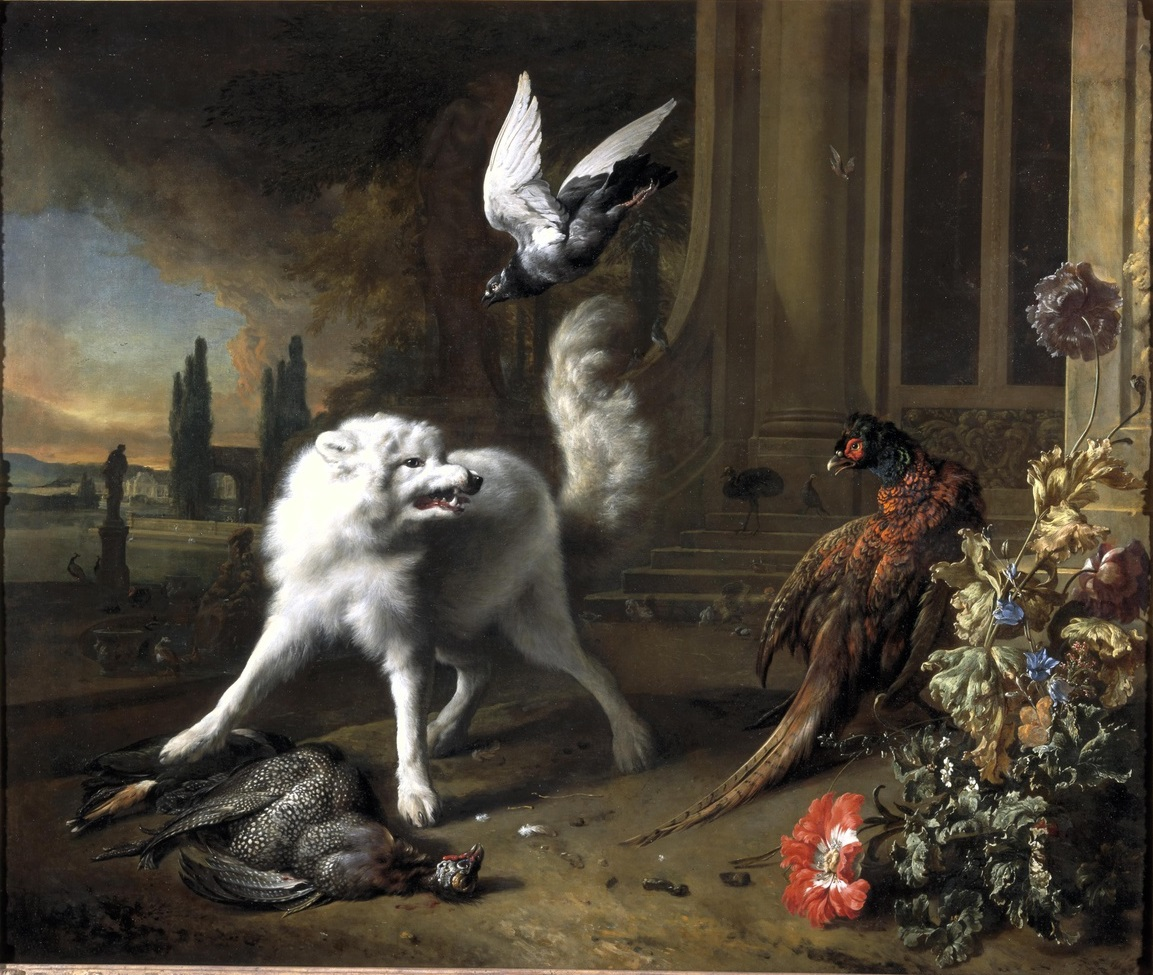
A Dog Guards a Guinea Fowl (ca. 1680), oil on canvas, Centraal Museum

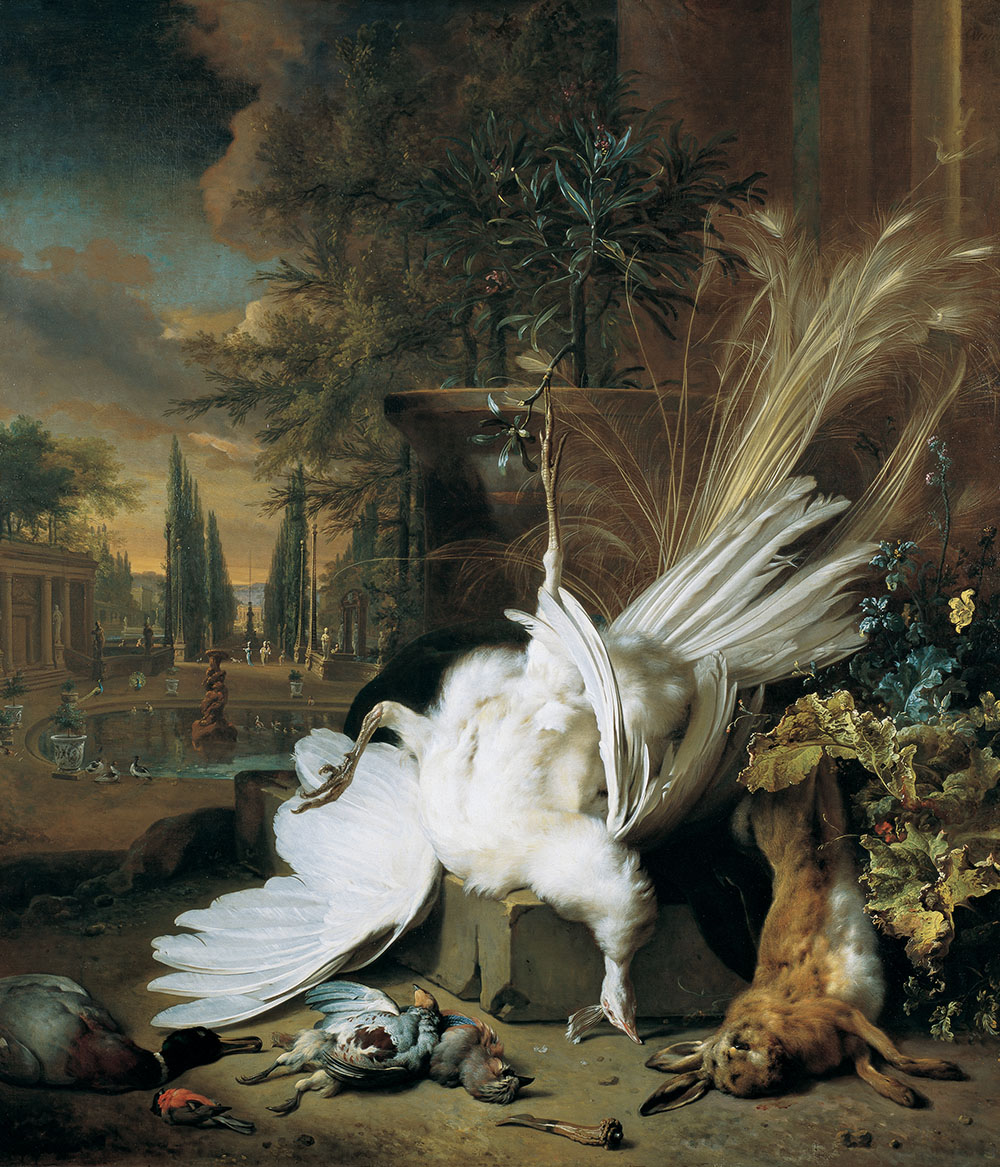
The White Peacock (1692), oil on canvas, 191 x 166 cm., Academy of Fine Arts Vienna

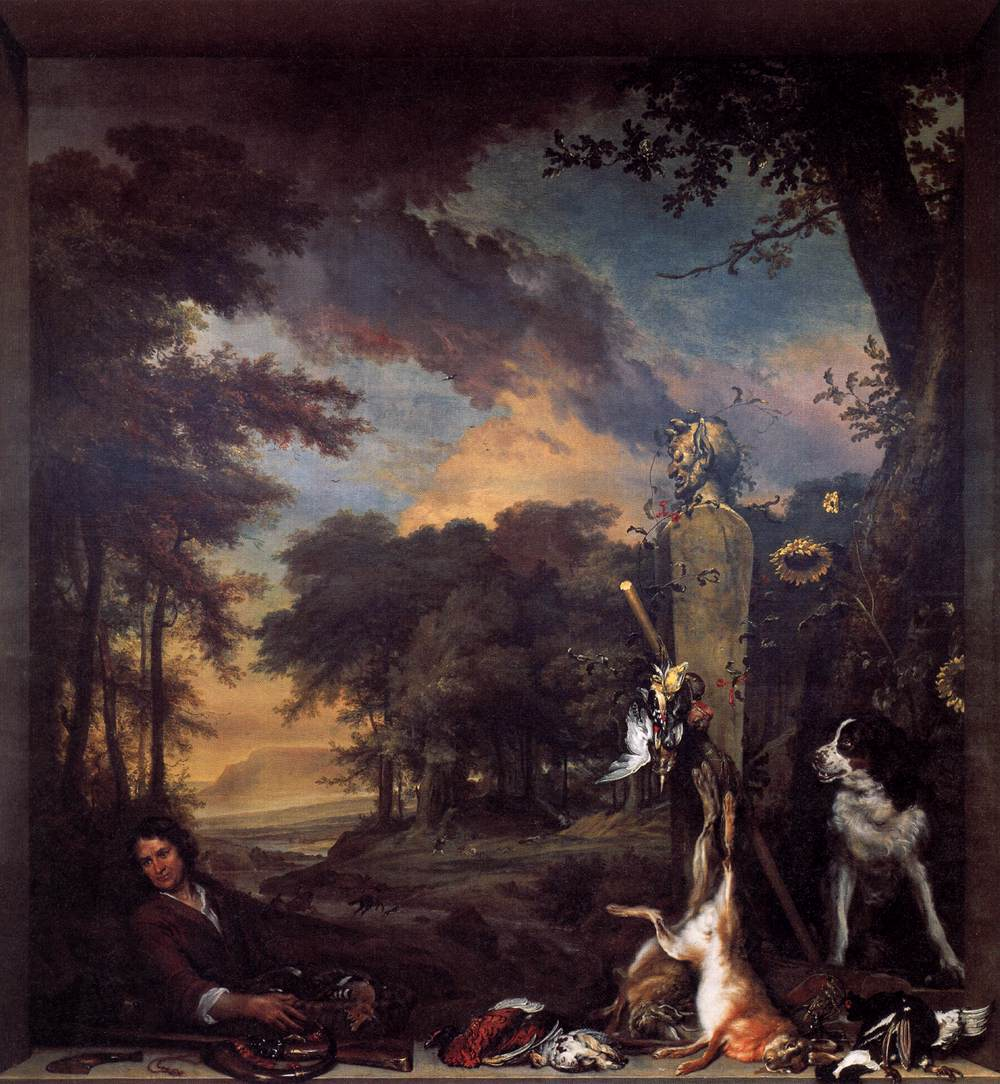
Landscape with Huntsman and Dead Game (1697), oil on canvas, 344 x 323 cm., Scottish National Gallery

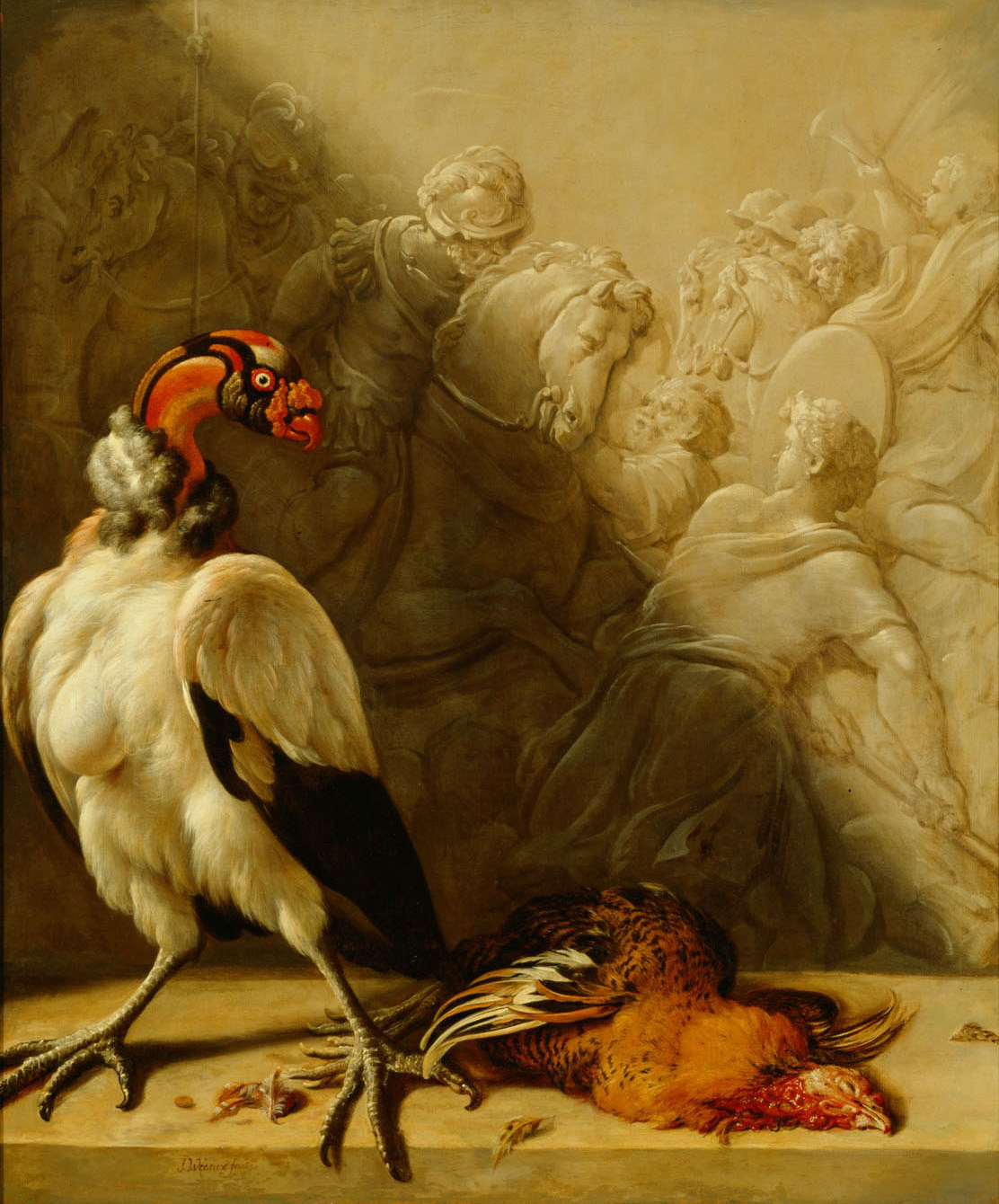
South American King Vulture (ca. 1700), 117 x 98 cm., Kunsthistorisches Museum

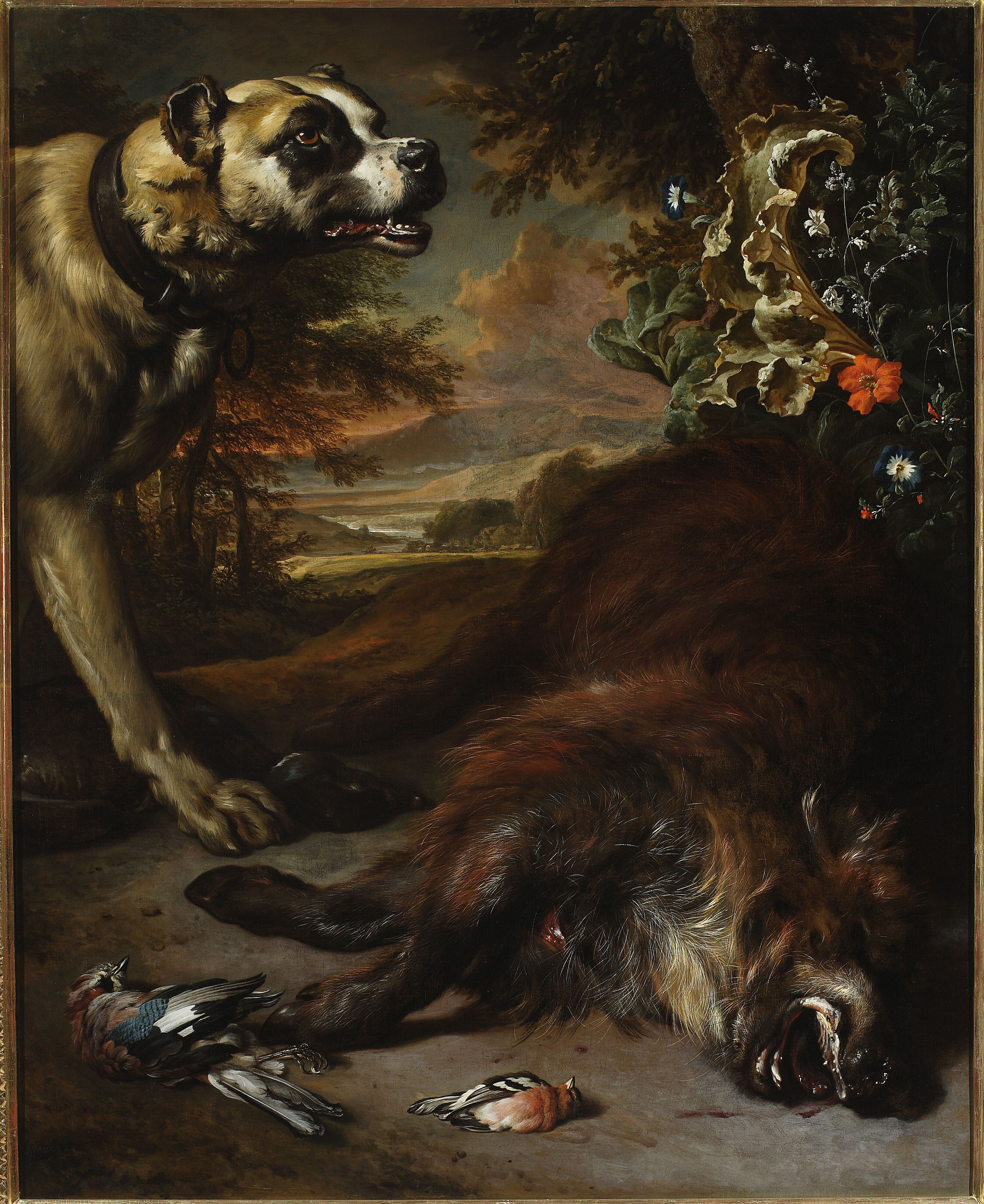
Still Life (1705), oil on canvas, 123 x 99 cm., National Museum, Warsaw

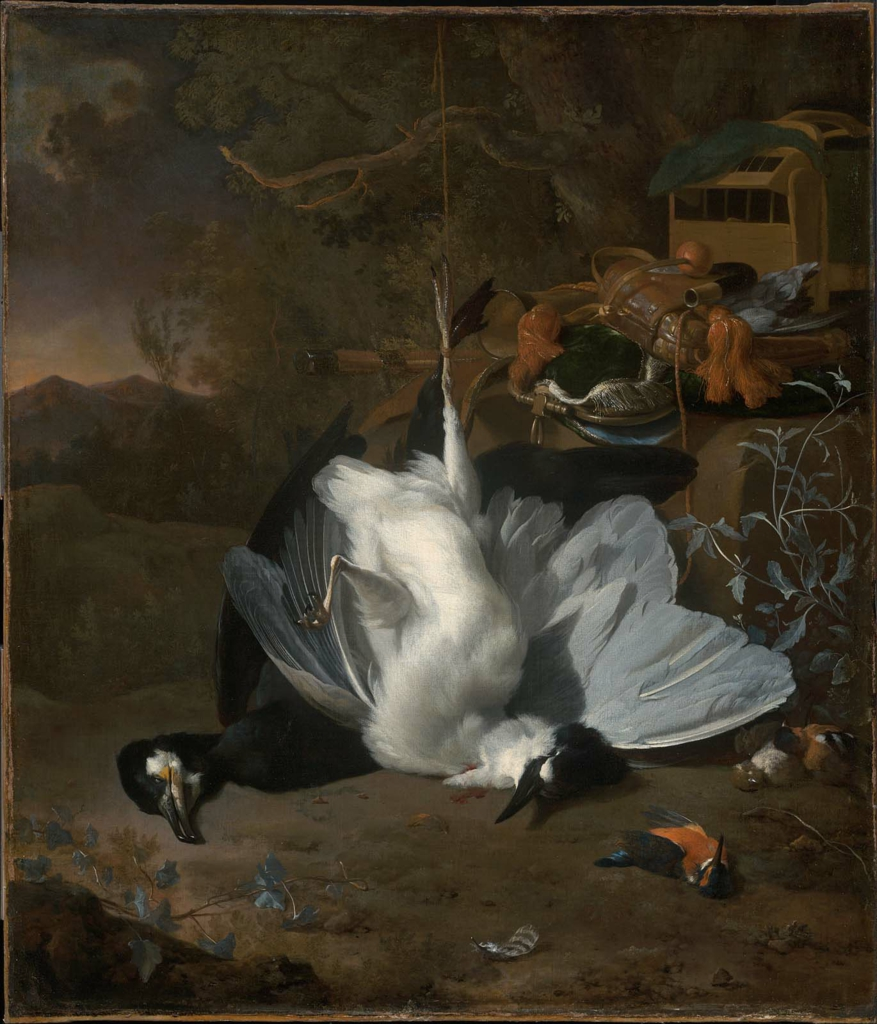
Dead Birds and Hunting Equipment in a Landscape (no date), oil on canvas, 97.8 x 83.8 cm., Museum of Fine Arts, Boston

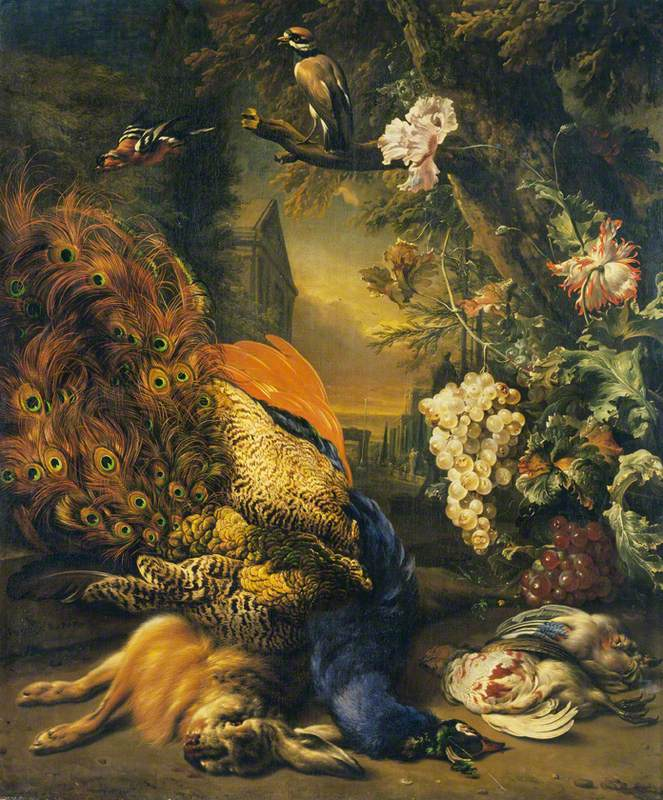
Dead Peacock and Game (1707), oil on canvas, Wallace Collection

== Sources ==
Attribution:

- Anke A. Van Wagenberg-Ter Hoeven (2018) Jan Baptist Weenix & Jan Weenix: The Paintings. Zwolle: Waanders & De Kunst, ISBN 9789462621596
