= Hagelstein =

Hagelstein can refer to:

Surname:

- Peter L. Hagelstein, a MIT professor
- Hans Hagelstein, a Dutch businessman
- Jacob Ernst Thomann von Hagelstein, a German Baroque painter

a building:

- Hagelstein Commercial Building, a Historic Place in the National Register of Historic Places listings in Tom Green County, Texas
