= Johan van Heemskerk =

Dutch poet (1597–1656)

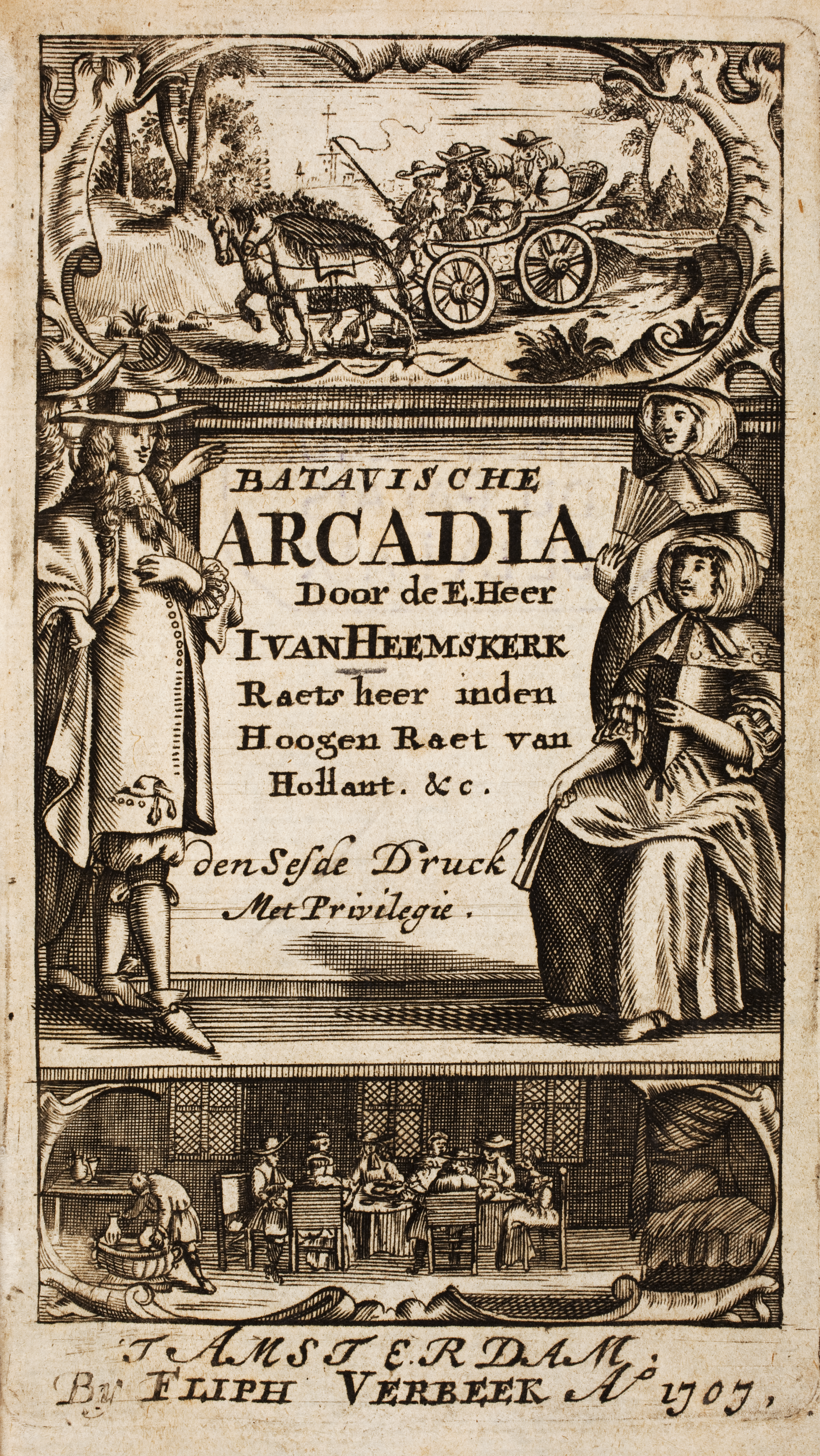
Title page of a 1707 edition Heemskerk's Batavische Arcadia

Johan van Heemskerk (1597–1656), Dutch poet, was born at Amsterdam.

He was educated as a child at Bayonne, and entered the University of Leiden in 1617. In 1621 he went abroad on the grand tour, leaving behind him his first volume of poems, Minnekunst (The Art of Love), which appeared in 1622. He was absent from Holland four years. He was made master of arts at Bourges in 1623, and in 1624 visited Hugo Grotius in Paris.

On his return in 1625 he published Minnepligt (The Duty of Love), and began to practise as an advocate in the Hague. In 1628 he was sent to England in his legal capacity by the Dutch East India Company, to settle the dispute respecting Amboyna. In the same year he published the poem entitled Minnekunde, or the "Science of Love."

He proceeded to Amsterdam in 1640, where he married Alida, sister of the patrician regent Geurt van Beuningen. In 1641 he published a Dutch version of Corneille's The Cid, a tragi-comedy, and in 1647 his most famous work, the pastoral romance of Batavische Arcadia, which he had written ten years before.

During the last twelve years of his life Heemskerk sat in the upper chamber of the states-general. He died at Amsterdam on 27 February 1656.

The poetry of Heemskerk, which fell into oblivion during the 18th century, is once more read and valued. His famous pastoral, the Batavische Arcadia, which was founded on the Astrée of Honoré d'Urfé, enjoyed a great popularity for more than a century, and passed through twelve editions.

It provoked a host of more or less able imitations, of which the most distinguished were the Dordrechtsche Arcadia (1663) of Lambert van den Bos (1610–1698), the Saanlandsche Arcadia (1658) of Hendrik Sooteboom (1616–1678) and the Rotterdamsche Arcadia (1703) of Willem den Elger (died 1703). But the original work of Heemskerk, in which a party of nymphs and shepherds go out from the Hague to Katwijk, and there indulge in polite and pastoral discourse, surpasses all these in brightness and versatility.
