= Jacob Pynas =

Dutch artist (1592 or 1593 – after 1650)

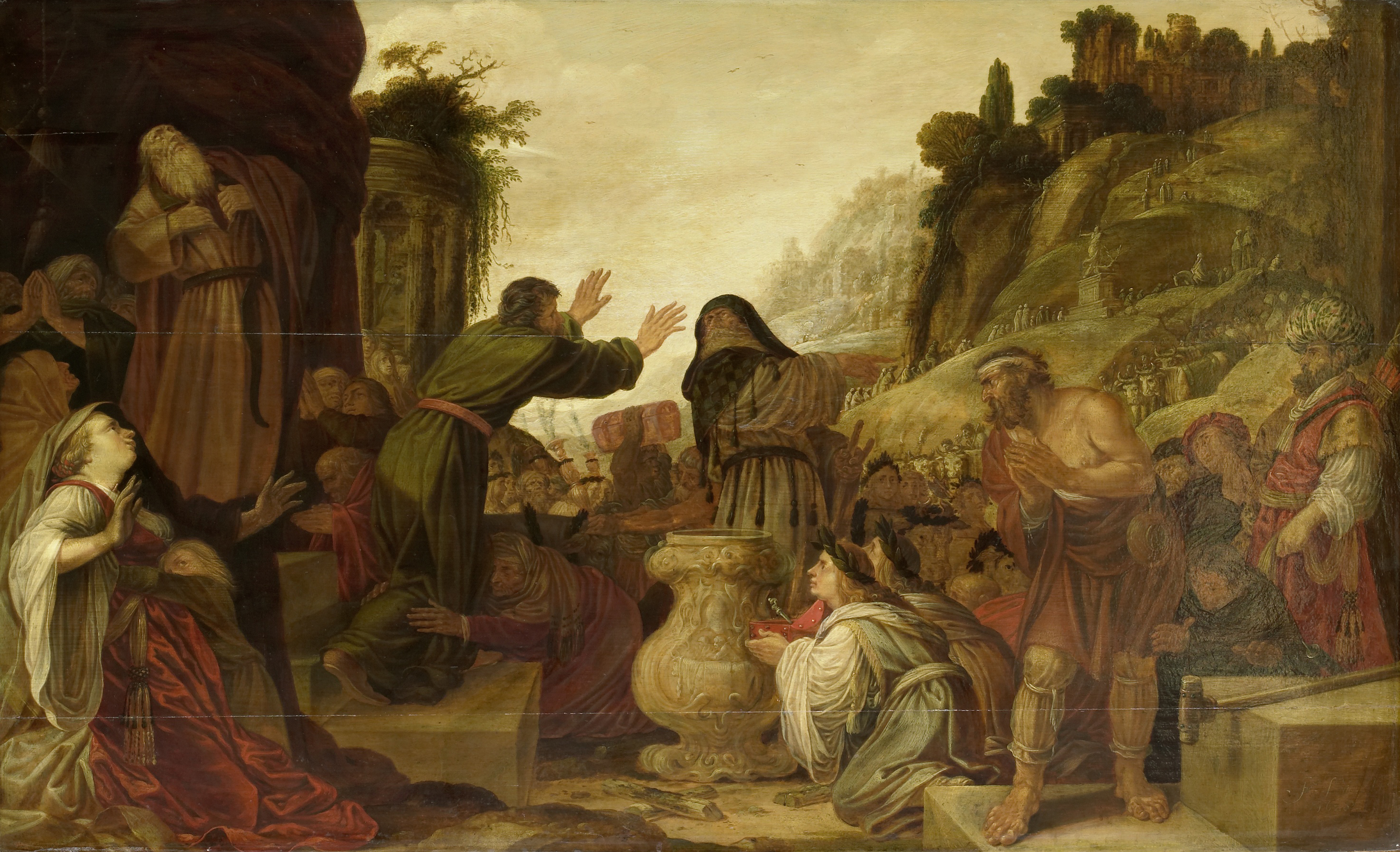
Saints Paul and Barnabas Worshipped as Gods by the People of Lystra (1628)

Jacob Symonsz. Pynas (1592 or 1593 – after 1650) was a Dutch Golden Age painter and draughtsman. He is best known for having briefly taught the painter Rembrandt in 1625.

== Biography ==
Pynas was born in Amsterdam in the Dutch Republic in 1592 or 1593. He was one of nine children born to Symon Jansz. Brouwer (d. 1624), a wealthy Catholic merchant from Alkmaar, and Oude Neel Jacobsdr van Harencarspel. Symon Brouwer adopted the name Pynas (Dutch: pinas, 'pinnance') in 1594 after purchasing a property in the center of Amsterdam called 'At the Sign of the Pinnance'.

According to Arnold Houbraken, a contemporary engraver and biographer, Rembrandt studied with Pynas for a few months in 1625 following his apprenticeship with the painter Pieter Lastman before opening his own studio in Leiden.

According to the RKD he was the brother of Jan Pynas who travelled to Italy. Their sister Meynsge married the artist Jan Tengnagel in 1611. Though Jacob is known for scenes of Italy, these paintings could have been based on sketches brought back by his brother Jan and it is not certain that Jacob travelled to Italy. Pynas became a citizen of Delft in 1631 and joined the St. Luke's Guild the following year. He remained there until 1639 when he returned to Amsterdam. He became the teacher of Bartholomeus Breenberg.

The Pynas brothers were grouped within Dutch artists called the Pre-Rembrandtists. Their work is close in style to the painter Adam Elsheimer, and there has been a history of mis-attribution between the three, where the Pynas brothers are known to have signed their works "J. Pynas."

Pynas died sometime after 1650 in Amsterdam.

== Selected works ==
- 1618 – Mercury and Herse, Oil on Copper, (Uffizi Gallery, Florence)
- 1618 – Landscape with Mercury and Battus, Oil on Canvas, (Wiener collection, New York)
- 1628 – Mountain Landscape with Narcissus, Oil on Wood, (National Gallery, London)
- 17th century – Paul and Barnabas at Lystra, Oil on Wood, (Metropolitan Museum of Art, New York City)
- 17th century – Sacrifice of Isaac, Pen, ink and watercolour on paper, (Courtauld Institute of Art, London)
- 17th century – Sacrifice of Gideon, Watercolour and chalk on paper, (Courtauld Institute of Art, London)
- 17th century – Christ and the lawyer, Chalk on paper, (Courtauld Institute of Art, London)
- 17th century – Apollo and Daphne, Pen and Ink on paper, (Courtauld Institute of Art, London)
- 17th century – The Good Samaritan, Oil on Copper, (Louvre, Paris) du Musée Jeanne d'Aboville de La Fère, dans l'Aisne.
- 17th century – The Flight into Egypt, Oil, (Louvre, Paris)
- 17th century – The Canaanite woman kissing the bottom of Jesus's robe, drawing, (Louvre, Paris)
- 17th century – Landscape with Juno, Minerva, Venus, Paris and Cupid, Ink drawing, (Louvre, Paris)

== Gallery ==
=== Paintings ===
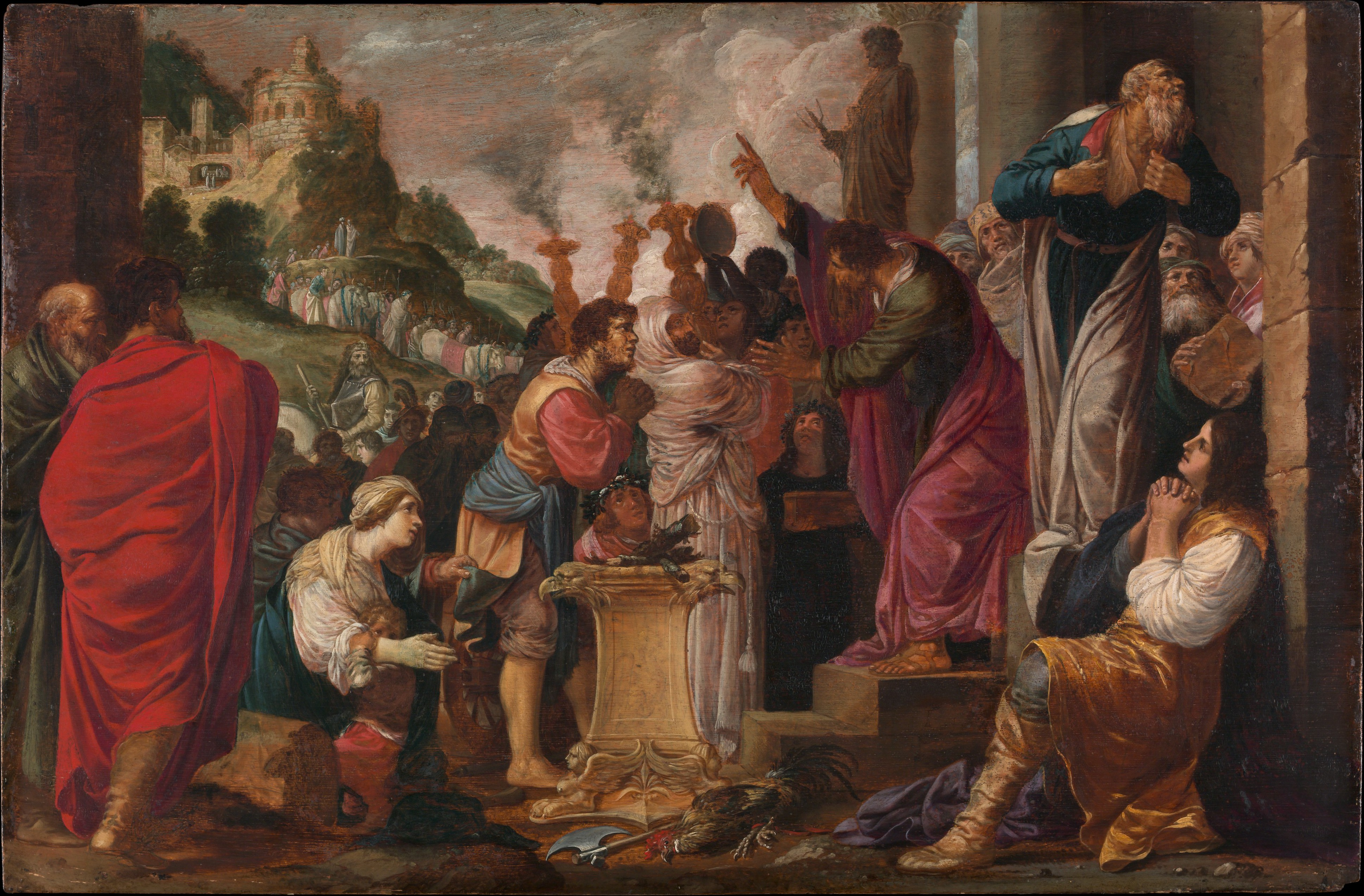
Paul and Barnabas at Lystra (1620s)

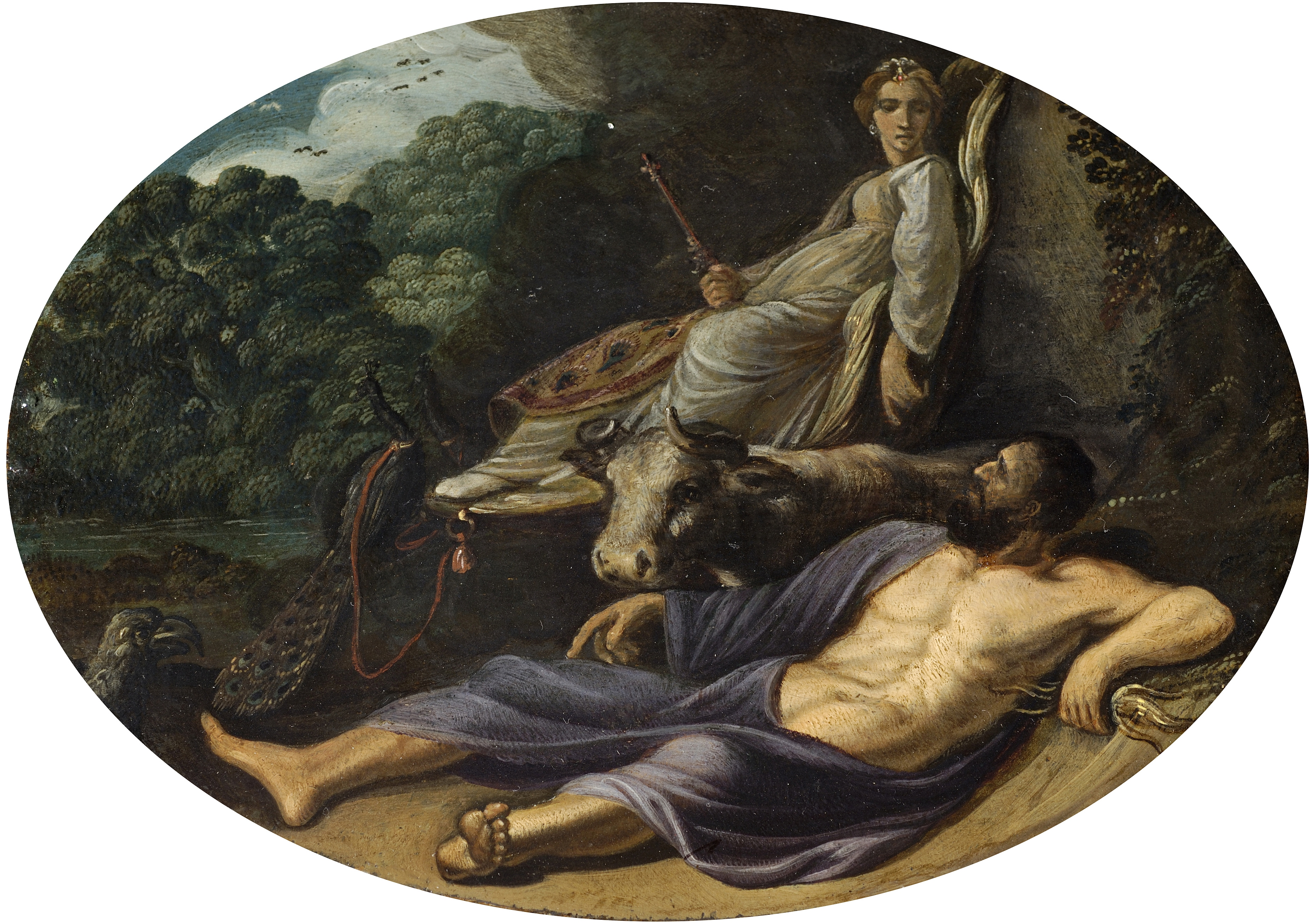
Jupiter and Io

=== Drawings ===
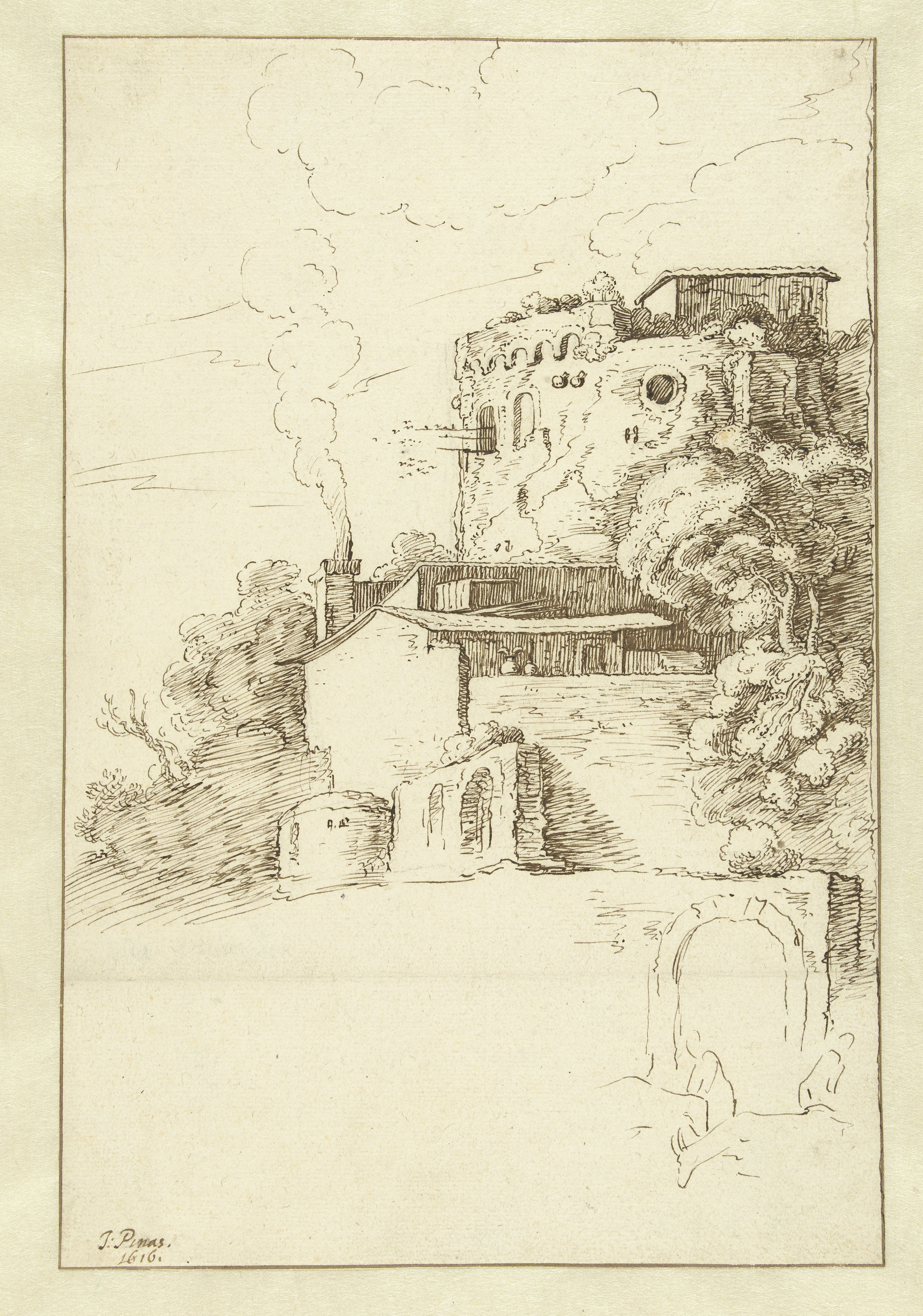
A Round Tower and Buildings (1616)

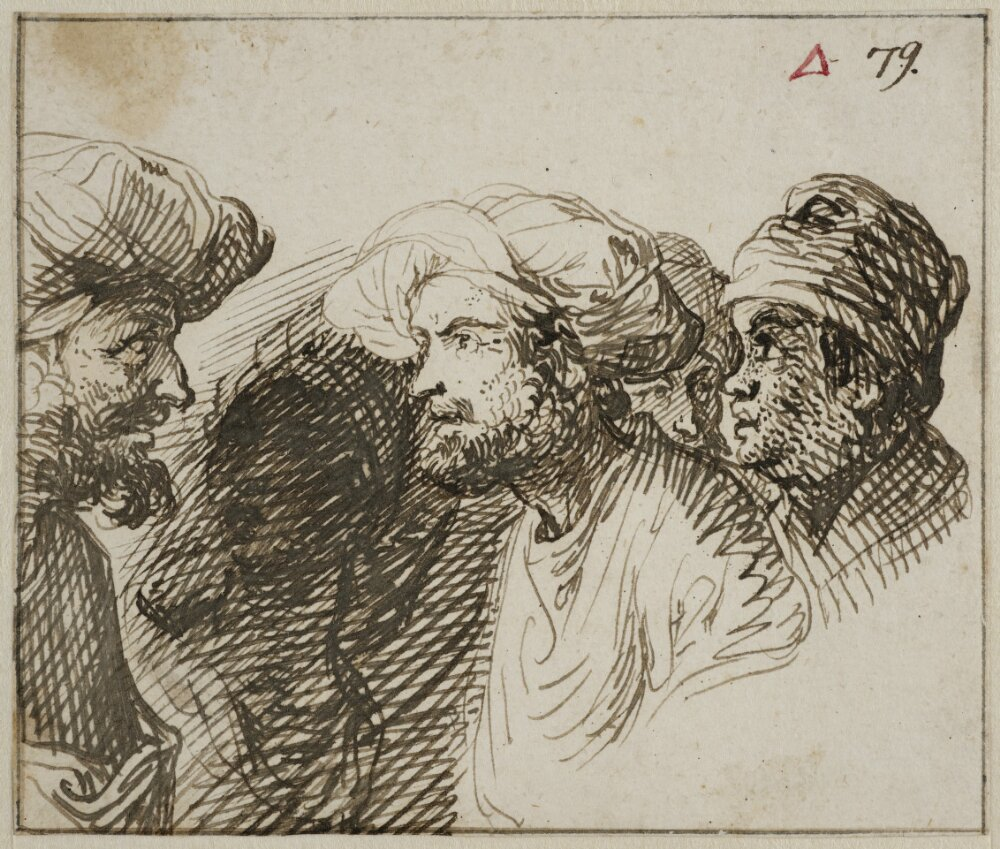
Heads of Orientals

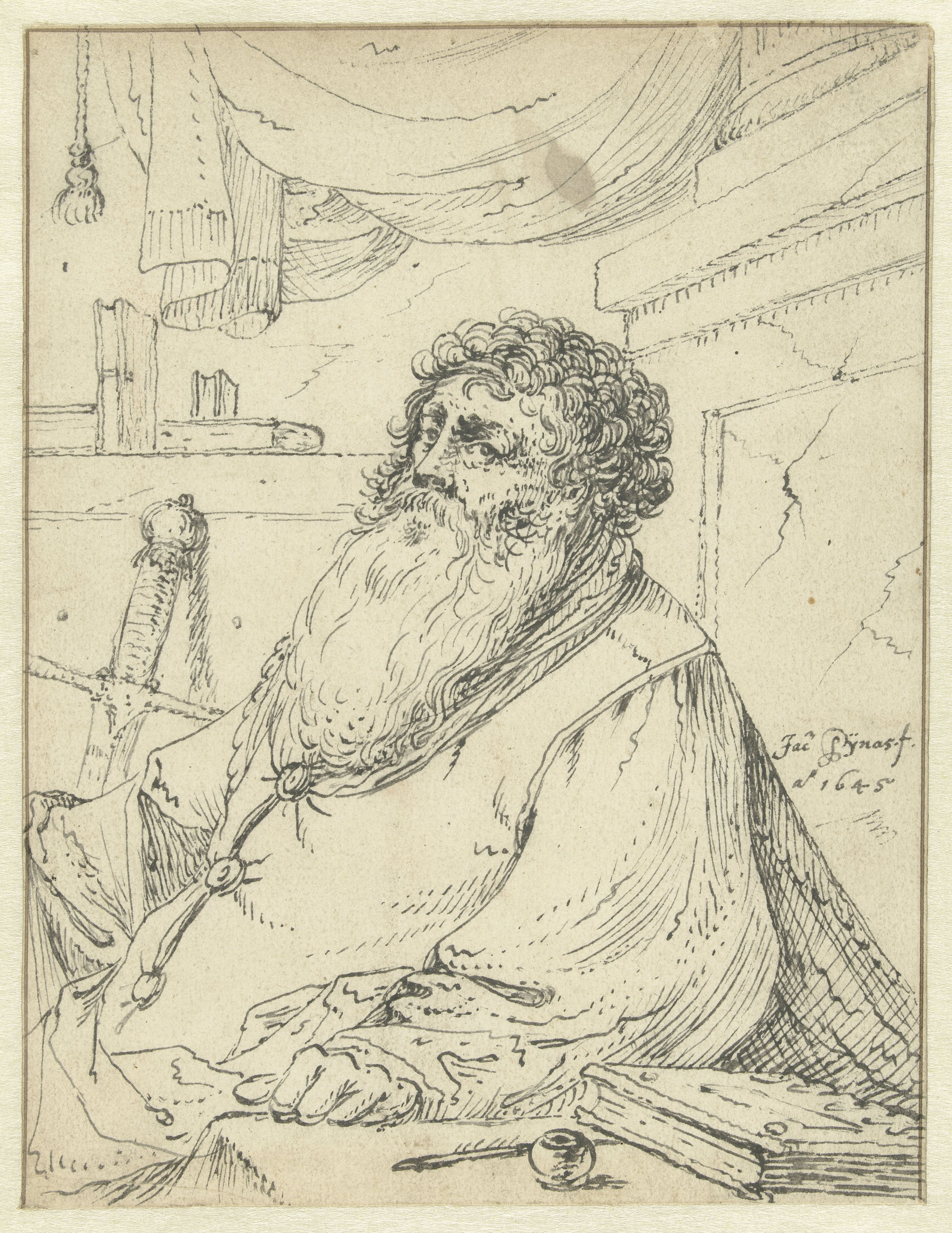
