= Jan Pynas =

Dutch Golden Age painter

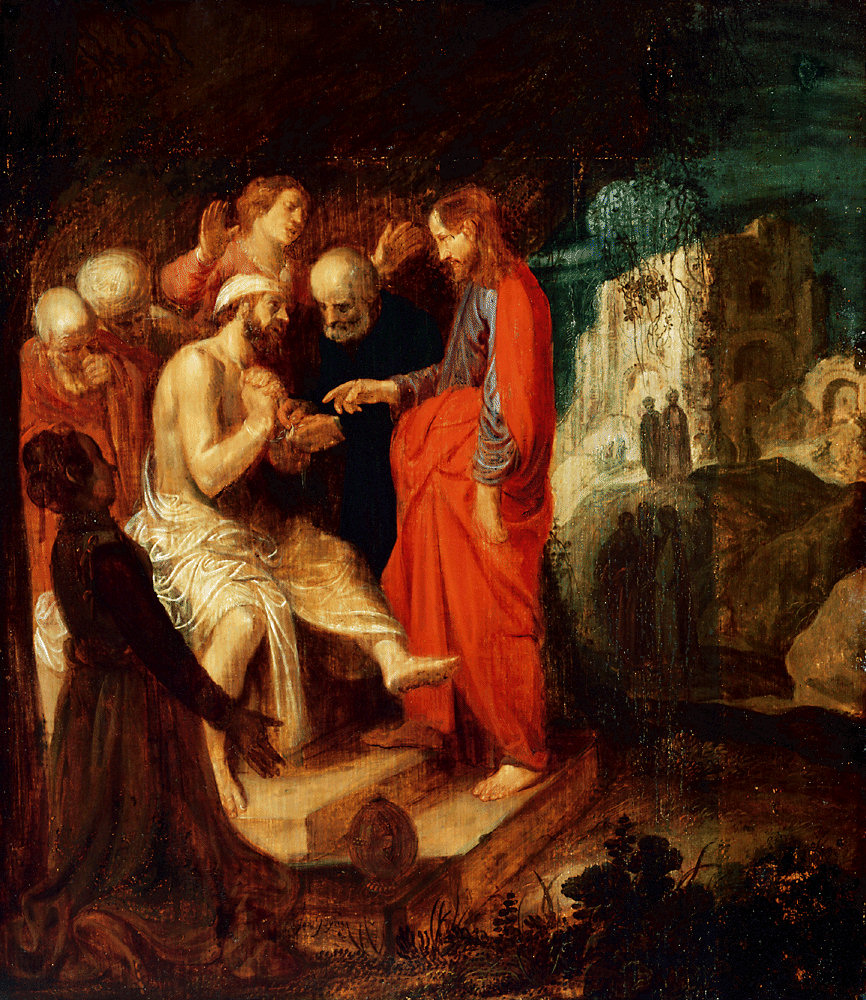
Raising Lazarus, c.1615, collection Philadelphia Museum of Art

Jan Symonsz. Pynas (1582, Alkmaar – 1631, Amsterdam), was a Dutch Golden Age painter.

== Biography ==
According to Houbraken Jan and Jacob Pynas were good at landscapes and figures, but Jan was better than Jacob. Jan travelled to Italy in 1605 with Pieter Lastman where they spent several years practising art after the great Italian masters.

According to the RKD he was the brother of Jacob and he made two trips to Italy in 1605 and 1617 and it is not certain his brother accompanied him. In Rome he was friends with Adam Elsheimer, Pieter Lastman, and Jacob Ernst Thomann von Hagelstein. Jan's sister Meynsge married the artist Jan Tengnagel in 1611. He became the teacher of Bartholomeus Breenberg and Steven van Goor.

The works of the Pynas brothers are close in style to the painter Adam Elsheimer, and there has been a history of mis-attribution between the three, where both of the Pynas brothers are known to have signed their works "J. Pynas."

Jan died in Amsterdam; Jacob survived him by many years and is thought to have died in Delft.

== Selected works ==
- 1605 – Raising of Lazarus, (Aschaffenburg)
- 1610 – Moses Turning Water into Blood, (Rembrandthuis, Amsterdam)
- 1613 – Dismissal of Hagar, (Suermondt-Ludwig Museum, Aachen)
- 1618 – Jacob Being Shown Joseph’s Bloodstained Robe (Hermitage Museum, Saint Petersburg)
- 1618 – Joseph Selling Corn in Egypt, (London)
