= Gerrit Pietersz Sweelink =

Dutch Golden Age painter (1566–1612)

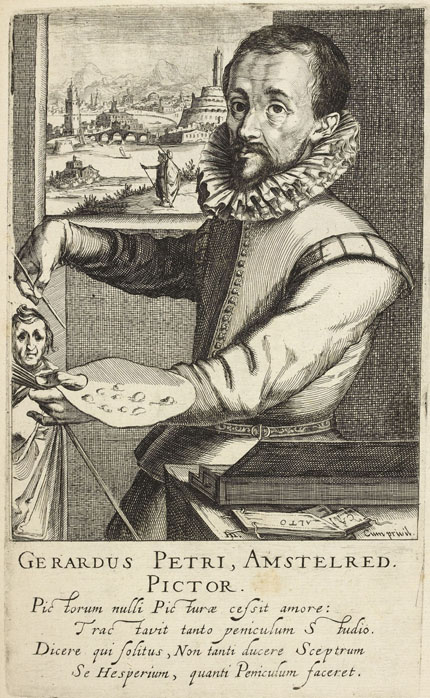
Gerrit Pietersz by Hendrick Hondius and Simon Frisius.

Gerrit Pietersz Sweelink (1566–1612) was a Dutch Golden Age painter.

== Biography ==
Sweelink was born and died in Amsterdam. According to Karel van Mander he was first taught to paint by Jacob Lenartsz, a glasspainter of Amsterdam whose father was a seaman from Zandvoort. He was such a good student that he was recommended to the painter Cornelis van Haarlem by Jacob Rauwaert. He was the brother of the Orpheus of Amsterdam, the organist Jan Pieterszoon Sweelinck, whose portrait he later painted. He lived in Antwerp many years and was in Rome for even longer. When Van Mander was writing Sweelink was living back in Amsterdam and still painting. Sweelink had taught a few good students, including a painter named "Govert" in Amsterdam, and Pieter Lastman in Italy.

According to the RKD he is known for portraits and mythological and religious pieces. He possibly died in 1612, since the engraved portrait of him in the engraving by Simon Frisius for Hendrik Hondius I refers to him in the past tense.
