= Simon Frisius =

Dutch engraver (1570/5–1628/9)

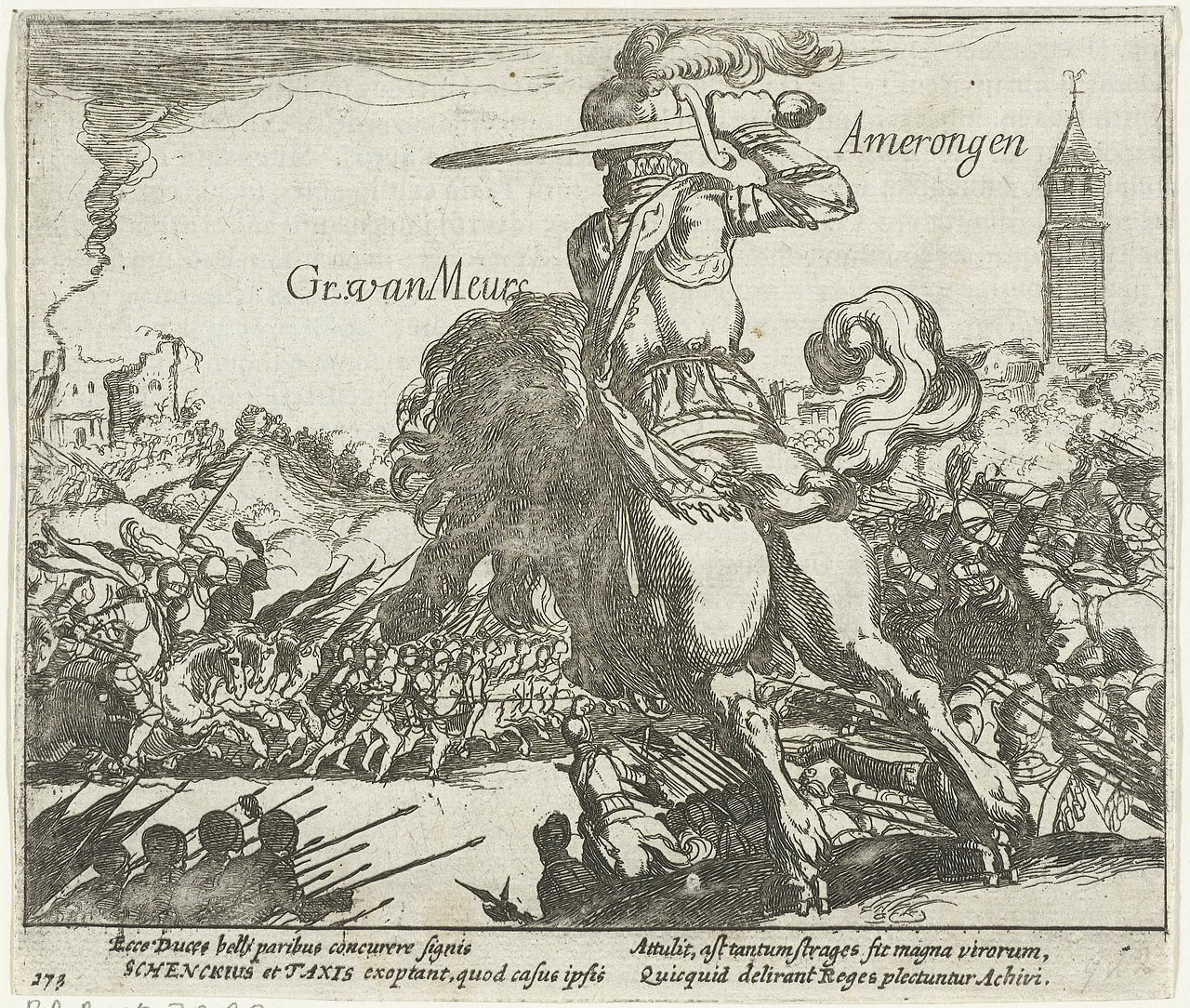
Adolf van Nieuwenaar at the Battle of Amerongen: etching from 1613 to 1615

Simon de Vries, also known as Simon Frisius (born c. 1570–75, in Harlingen – died c. 1628–29, The Hague), was a Dutch engraver.

== Life ==
He started his career in Paris, and worked in Rouen and Amsterdam before moving to the Hague in 1611 where he became a member of the Confrerie Pictura. He travelled in France, Spain, Germany, Bohemia, and Russia.

== Work ==
Frisius is regarded as one of the first to bring etching to perfection. Abraham Bosse, in his treatise on the art of engraving, observes that the first artist to whom he was indebted for intelligence was Simon Frisius, whom he thinks was entitled to great credit, as being one of the first to handle the point with freedom and facility. His etchings are bold and masterly; and in his hatchings he approaches the neatness and strength of the graver.

The prints of De Vries are scarce, and are much esteemed. The small figures which he occasionally introduced into his landscapes are correctly drawn. He frequently marked his plates S. F. fecit, but sometimes with the word fecit only.

== Principal works ==
The following are his principal works:

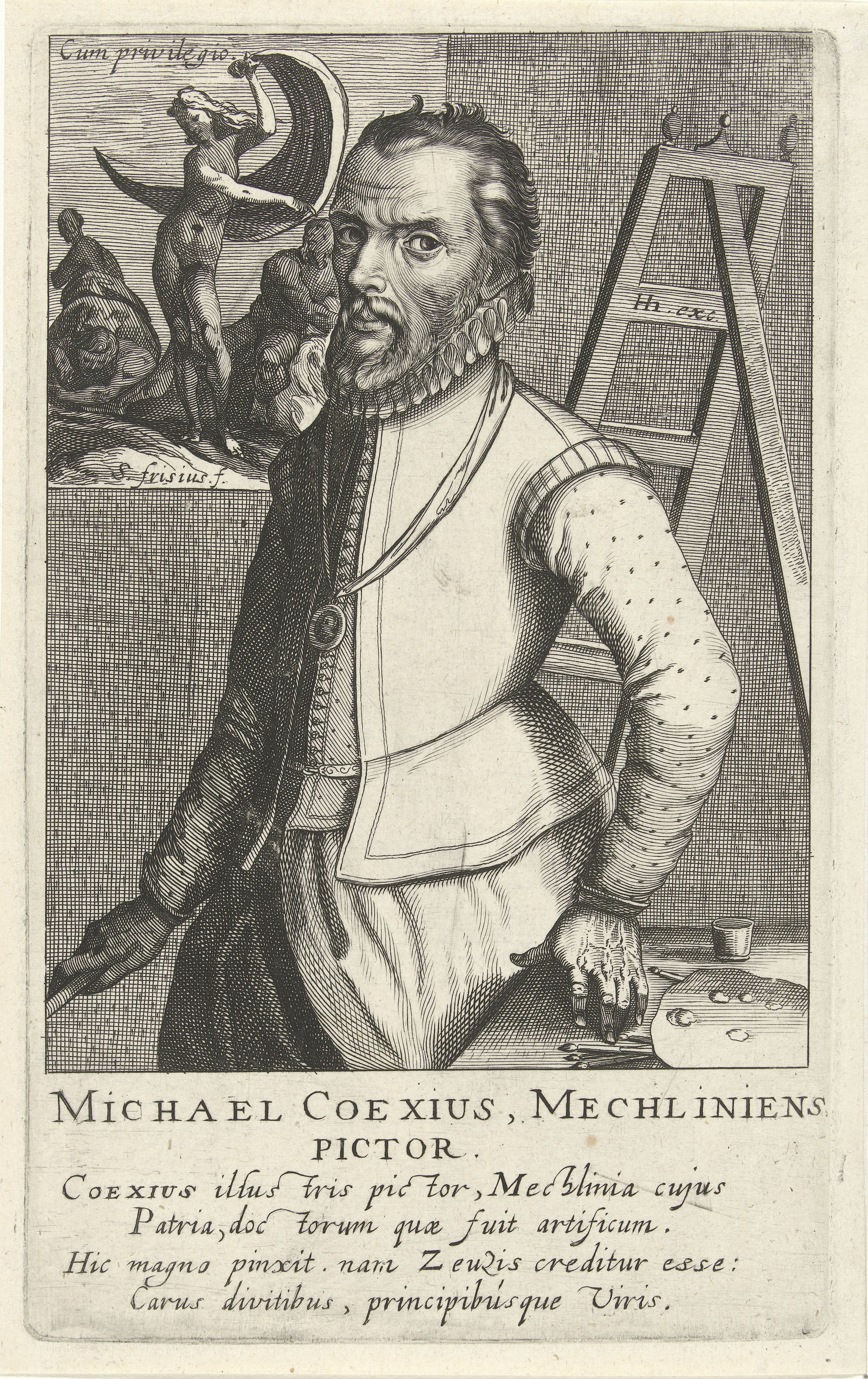
Portrait of Michiel Coxie

- A set of twelve small heads of female Saints and Sibyls; after his own designs.
- A set of Portraits; after Hendrik Hondius.
- A set of twelve plates of Birds and Butterflies; after Marcus Geerarts.
- Twenty-five Views and Landscapes; entitled, Typographia variarum Regionum; after paintings of Matthijs Bril. 1611 and 1613–14.
- A mountainous Landscape on the Sea-coast, with figures; after Hendrik Goltzius.
- A Landscape, with a Tower; after the same. 1608.
- A Landscape, with the story of Tobit and the Angel; after P. Lastman.
- A Landscape, with the Flight into Egypt; after H. Hondius.
- A Landscape, with two pastoral figures; highly finished, and very scarce.

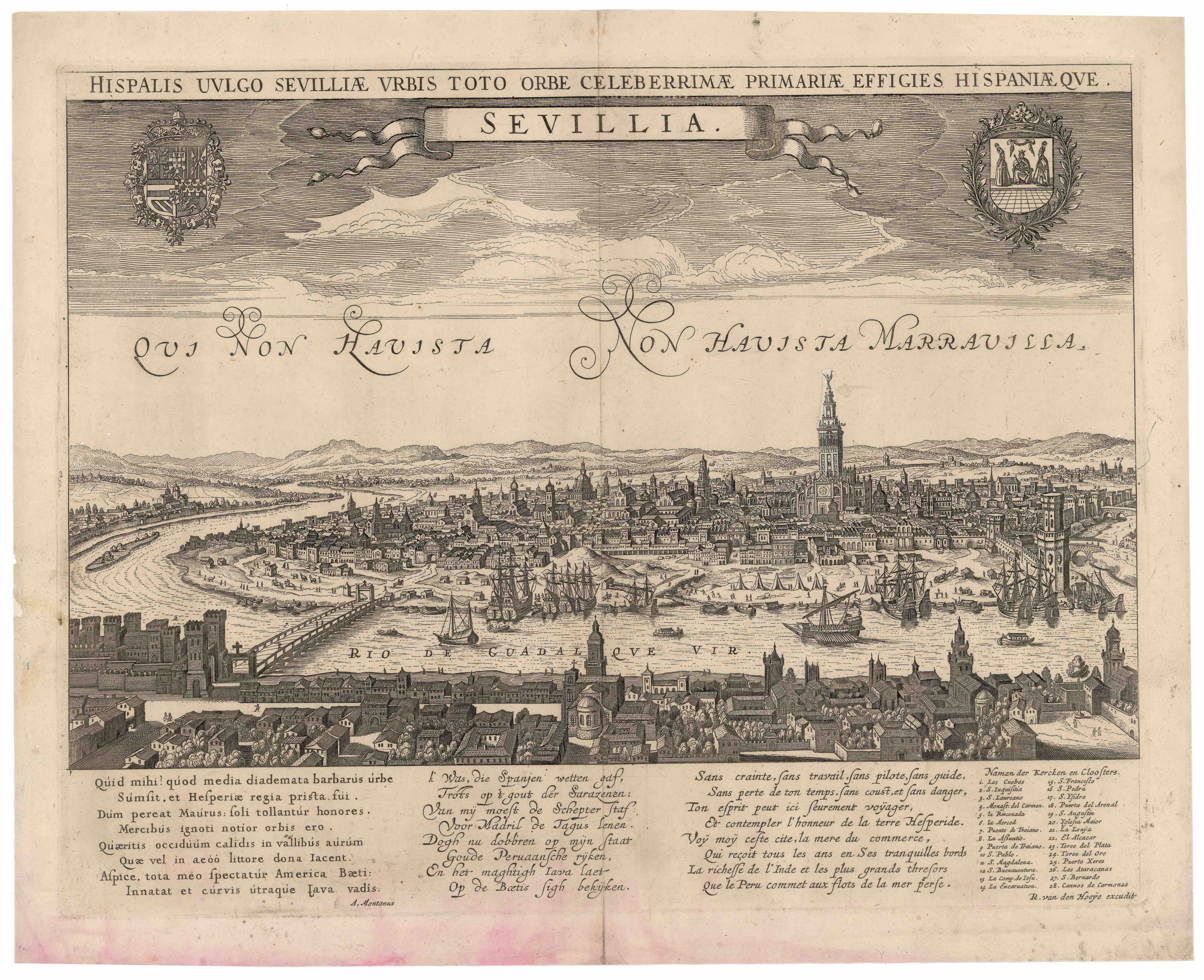
Sevilla 1605 - Simon Frissius
