= Jacob Ernst Thomann von Hagelstein =

German Baroque painter

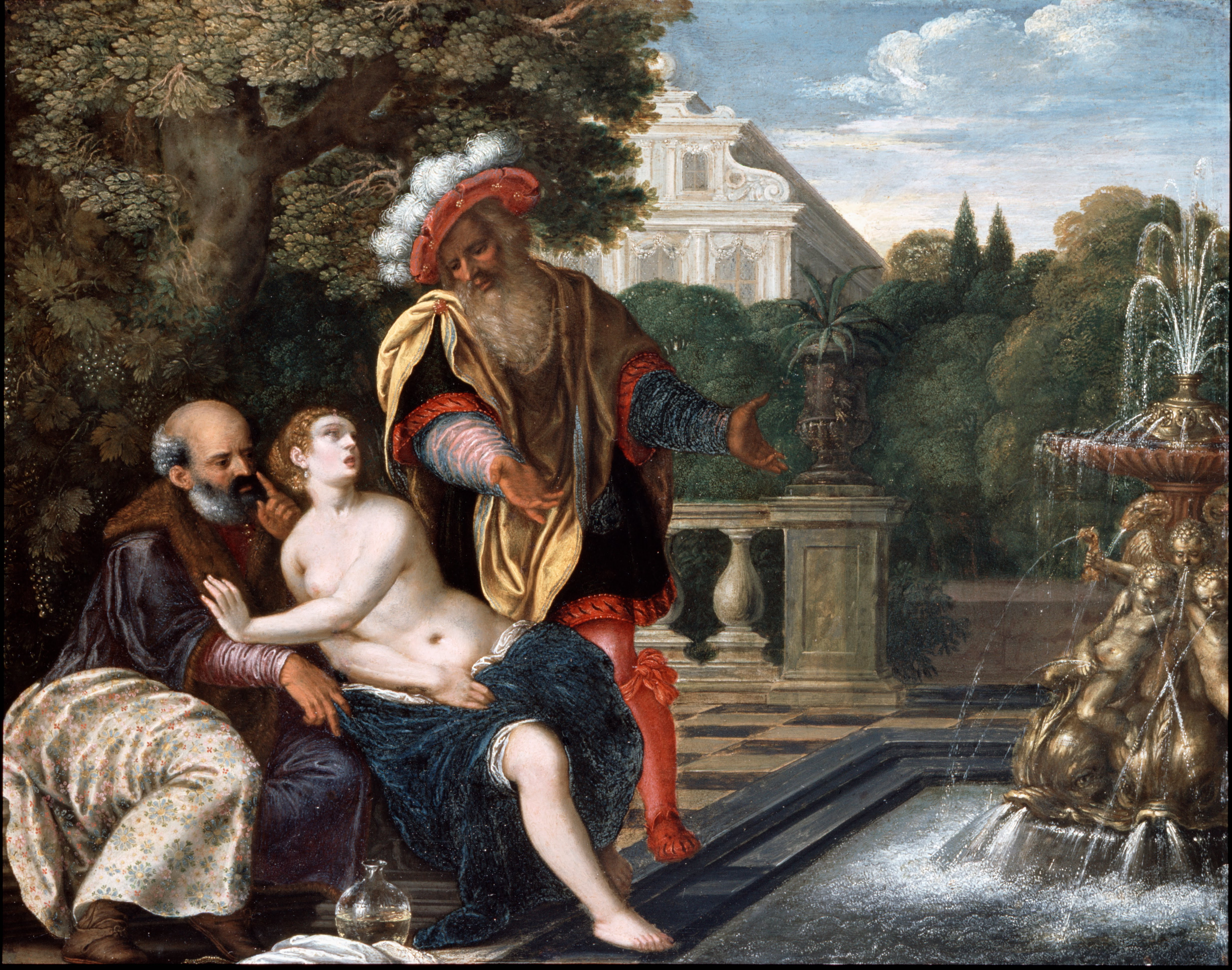
Susanna and the Elders, c. 1620, Dulwich Picture Gallery

Jacob Ernst Thomann von Hagelstein, or Nestus Thomann (c. 1588 – 10 October 1653) was a German Baroque painter.

== Biography ==
Hagelstein was born in Lindau. Houbraken remarked that he had never been in the Netherlands, and only included the biography of Nestus Thomann because of his relationship to other Dutch painters. He took his information from Joachim von Sandrart's Teutsche Akademie. According to him, Thoman was born in Hagelstein, a small village near Lindau in 1588 and traveled to Italy in 1605 where he stayed for 15 years, visiting Naples, Genoa and Rome. In Rome he was friends with Adam Elsheimer, Pieter Lastman, and Jan Pinas. After Elsheimer's death he returned to his homeland, where he found a position in service of Ferdinand III, Holy Roman Emperor. He died in Lindau. His works could be seen at the time Sandrart was writing in the home of his son, David Thomann, a respected doctor and member of the city council in Augsburg, where Sandrart was writing his book.

According to the Netherlands Institute for Art History, he was born and died in Lindau as a painter of religious scenes and landscapes.
