= Nicolaes Lastman =

Dutch Golden Age painter (1585-1625)

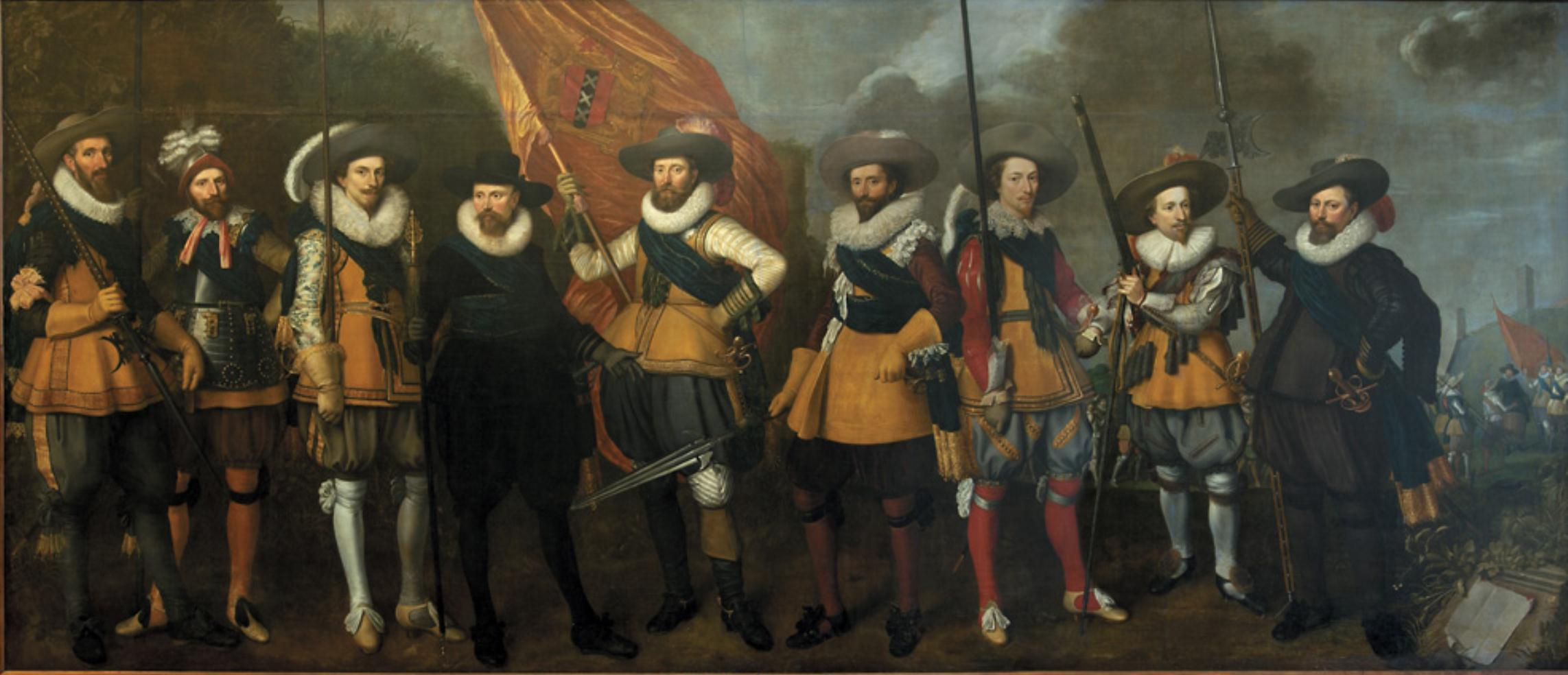
Civic guard of Abraham Boom and lieutenant Oetgens van Waveren, 1623

Nicolaes Lastman (1585 in Amsterdam – 1625 in Amsterdam), was a Dutch Golden Age painter. According to the Netherlands Institute for Art History, he was the brother of Pieter Lastman and is sometimes mistakenly called "Claes Pietersz Lastman" as the son of Pieter. He is known for portraits, landscapes, and architectural studies. He started a large schutterstuk in Amsterdam that was later finished by Adriaen van Nieulandt.

== Works ==
Lastman's works include:

- The Agony in the garden
- Paesaggio con la predica di san giovanni battista
- Civic guard of Abraham Boom and lieutenant Oetgens van Waveren
