= Jan Tengnagel =

Dutch draughtsman and painter

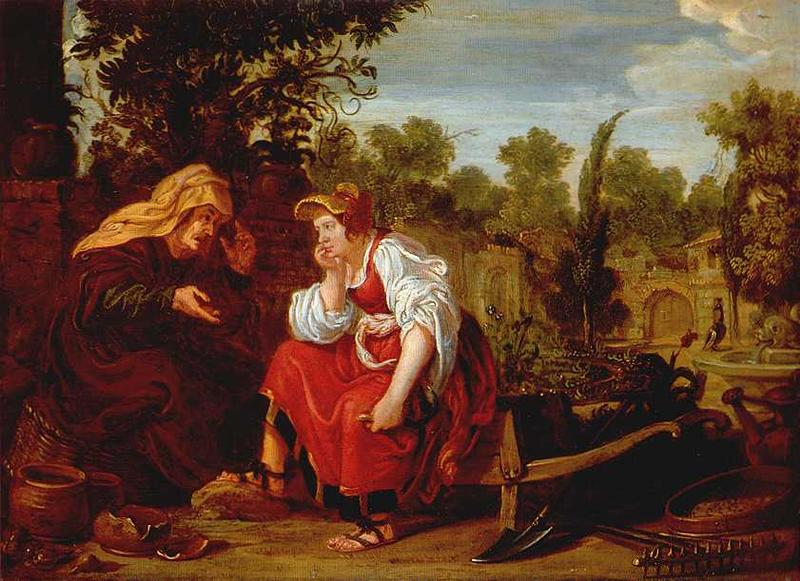
Jan Tengnagel, Vertumnus and Pomona, Rembrandt House Museum, 1617

Jan Tengnagel (baptised 9 September 1584– buried 23 March 1635) was a Dutch draughtsman and painter.

Jan Tengnagel is one of the lesser known history painters of the early seventeenth-century group in Amsterdam centered around Pieter Lastman, who were of great importance to Dutch painting. The fact that he is not well known is probably due to his very limited oeuvre. Tengnagel born and died in Amsterdam, but traveled and lived in Rome, Italy, between 1608 and 1611. He painted mainly biblical and other religious works.

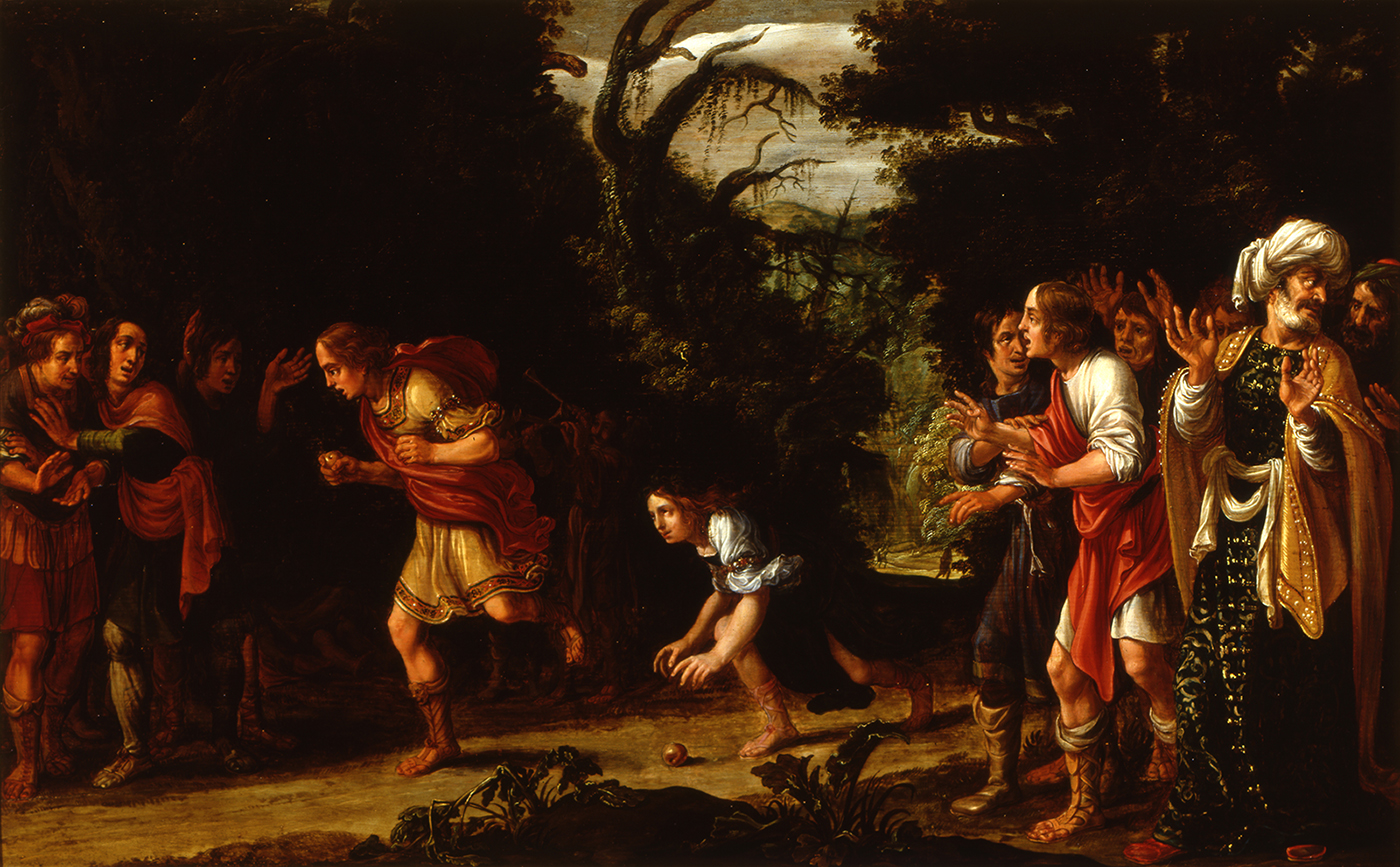
Atalante and Hippomenes

Born in Amsterdam in 1584, Tengnagel probably trained under Frans Badens. In the summer of 1608 he was in Rome and in 1611 he married a sister of the painters Jan and Jacob Pynas. In 1612 he became a sergeant in the archers' civic guild and from 1616 to 1618 he was dean of the Guild of St. Luke in Amsterdam. That he was well-known is evident from mentions of him as an eminent painter in two publication of that time; and B.Gerbier, "Een ende Claght-Dicht Ter Eeren van de lofweerdigen Hernritus Goltzius, Den Haag 1620.

Nevertheless he opted for a career in public service, becoming a provost in 1619 and being appointed deputy-sheriff in 1625. The last dated works by him are of 1624, after which he seems to have ceased painting. He died a well-to-do man in Amsterdam 1635.

He had one pupil named Laurens Heinrich Hellewich.

== Personal life ==
In 1611, he married Maijnsje Simonsdr Pynas. They had a son named Mattheus Gansneb Tengnagel who became a poet.
