= Geurt van Beuningen =

Dutch merchant (1565–1633)

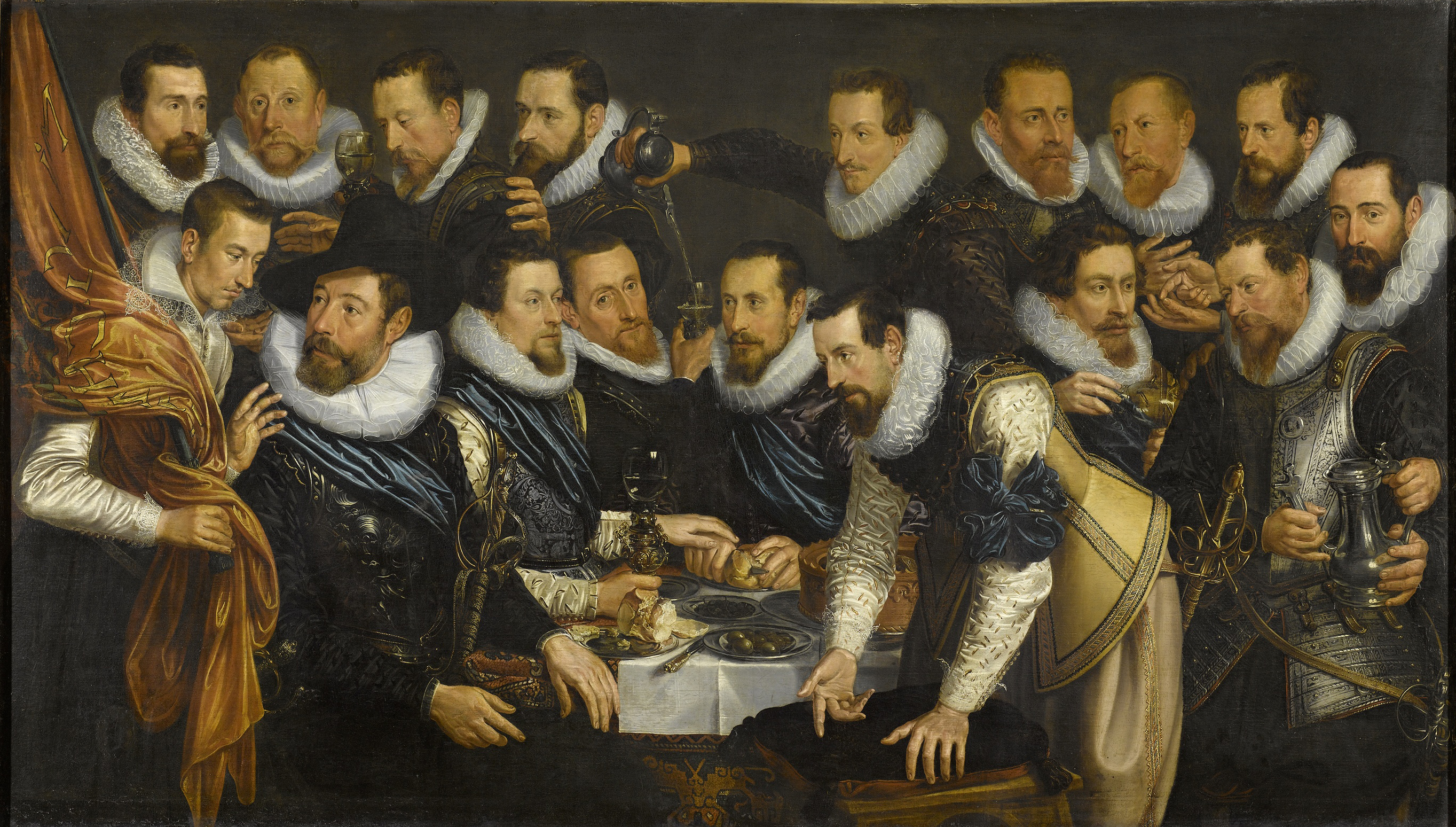
Painting by Jan Tengnagel (1613) of a rot (section) of 17 members of the Handboogdoelen civic guard under the command of Geurt van Beuningen, who is shown second from left on the bottom row.

Geurt van Beuningen (1565–1633) was a Dutch Golden Age merchant and burgomaster of Amsterdam who was one of the founders of the Dutch East India Company.

== Biography ==
Around 1600, Van Beuningen moved from the Kalverstraat to the Sint Antoniesbreestraat, where he lived next-door to Pieter Lastman, who would teach Rembrandt.

The son of a cheese-dealer, Van Beuningen was at first a merchant in dairy products, but became one of the biggest shareholder in the Dutch East India Company. He invested 15,000 guilders when the company was founded in 1602 and was named bewindhebber (governor) of the company. In 1623 Van Beuningen bought up all the pepper being shipped to Amsterdam, something which proved highly profitable was later repeated by others.

From the hand of Vondel the following anecdote on Van Beuningen's is known: scarcely recovered from a heavy illness, Van Beuningen (who was a Remonstrant Calvinist) wanted to go to the city hall on Dam Square, where a crucial decision had to be taken at the end of January 1628 on the election of new mayors. He received advice from the physician Nicolaes Tulp and a second opinion from a Roman Catholic physician. The latter one told him to travel with Tulp, also a fierce Calvinist, in his carriage to the city hall. Mayor Reynier Pauw, an anti-Remonstrant and one of the judges of Johan van Oldenbarneveldt, had not reckoned with another opponent and was stunned to see him walking in.

== Descendants ==
His son Dirk van Beuningen (1588–1648) married Catharina Burgh, sister of Albert Burgh. Dirk van Beuningen was active in the grain trade between Muscovy and the Levant, together with his brother-in-law Reynier Reaal. Dirk van Beuningen and his wife had six children, including the diplomat and burgomaster Coenraad van Beuningen.

== Bibliography ==
- Israel, J. (1995) The Dutch Republic. Its Rise, Greatness and Fall, p. 345–346
- Elias, J. E. (1903–1905, herdruk 1963) De vroedschap van Amsterdam, 1578–1795, 2 vols.
