= Hans Hagelstein =

Dutch businessman

Hans Hagelstein is a Dutch business man and currently General Team Manager of Feyenoord Rotterdam. He was appointed in 1991 and has been at the club since. He is mainly responsible for the logistics, like transport, training facilities, hotel bookings and all other similar tasks. In 2006, he was contacted by Leo Beenhakker with whom he worked together at Feyenoord in the 1990s to become his team manager for Trinidad and Tobago during the 2006 FIFA World Cup. After Feyenoord agreed he signed a temporary contract with Trinidad to become their team manager during the World Cup.
