= Pieter Lastman =

Dutch painter

- Born: 1583
- Died: 1633 (aged 49–50); Amsterdam
- Resting place: Oude Kerk
- Known for: Being the teacher of Rembrandt
- Style: Biblical landscapes

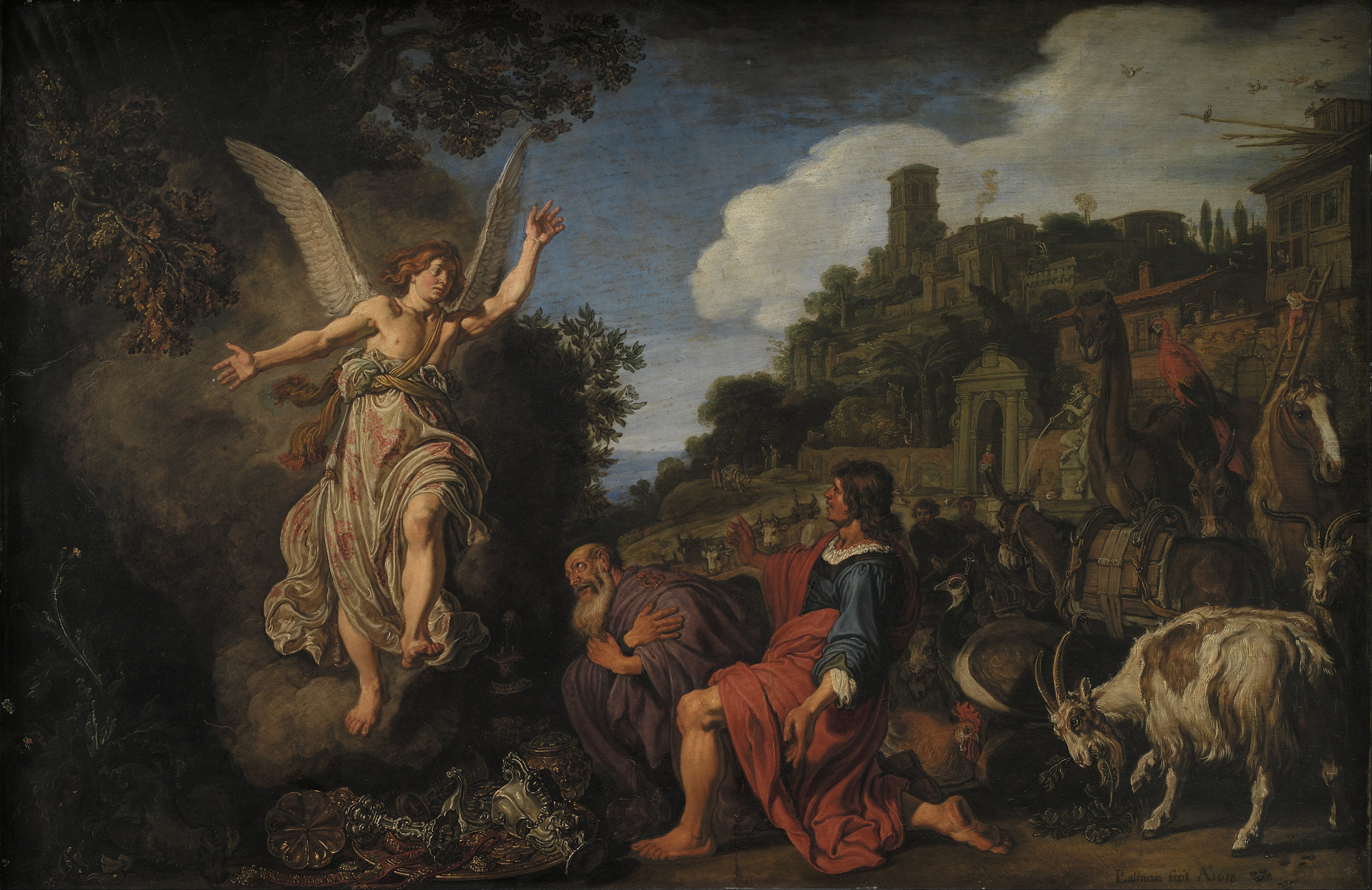
Pieter Lastman, The Angel Raphael Takes Leave of Old Tobit and his Son Tobias

Pieter Lastman (1583–1633) was a Dutch painter. Lastman is considered important because of his work as a painter of history pieces and because his pupils included Rembrandt and Jan Lievens. In his paintings Lastman paid careful attention to the faces, hands and feet.

== Early life ==
Pieter Lastman was born in Amsterdam. He was the fourth child of Pieter Segersz, (1548-1624), a town-beadle who was dismissed in 1578 for being a Catholic. His mother, Barber Jacobsdr, (1549-1624) was an appraiser of paintings and goods.

== Education and Italy ==
His apprenticeship was with Gerrit Pietersz Sweelinck, the brother of Jan Pieterszoon Sweelinck. Between approximately 1604 and 1607, Lastman was in Italy, where he was influenced by Caravaggio (as were the painters of the Utrecht School a few years later) and by Adam Elsheimer.

== Back in Amsterdam ==
Back in Amsterdam he moved in with his mother in the Sint Antoniesbreestraat, living next to mayor Geurt van Beuningen. Lastman never married although he promised to marry the sister of Gerbrand Adriaensz Bredero. Because of his health Lastman moved in with his brother in 1632.

== Death ==
He died the next year after moving in with his brother and was buried in the Oude Kerk on 4 April 1633.

== Students ==
Because Rembrandt never visited Italy, it is likely that he was influenced by Caravaggio (see e.g. chiaroscuro) mainly or significantly via Lastman. His pupils besides Rembrandt and Lievens were Bartholomeus Breenbergh, Nicolaes Lastman, Pieter Pieterz Nedek and Jan Albertsz Rotius.

Rembrandt used many of the same themes as Lastman. Among his most famous works his rendition of the Stoning of Saint Stephen, The Baptism of the Eunuch, and Sacrifice of Abraham appear to be very influenced by Lastman. It is even possible that as an apprentice, Rembrandt may have done the preliminary sketches for each of these works by Lastman.

== Gallery ==
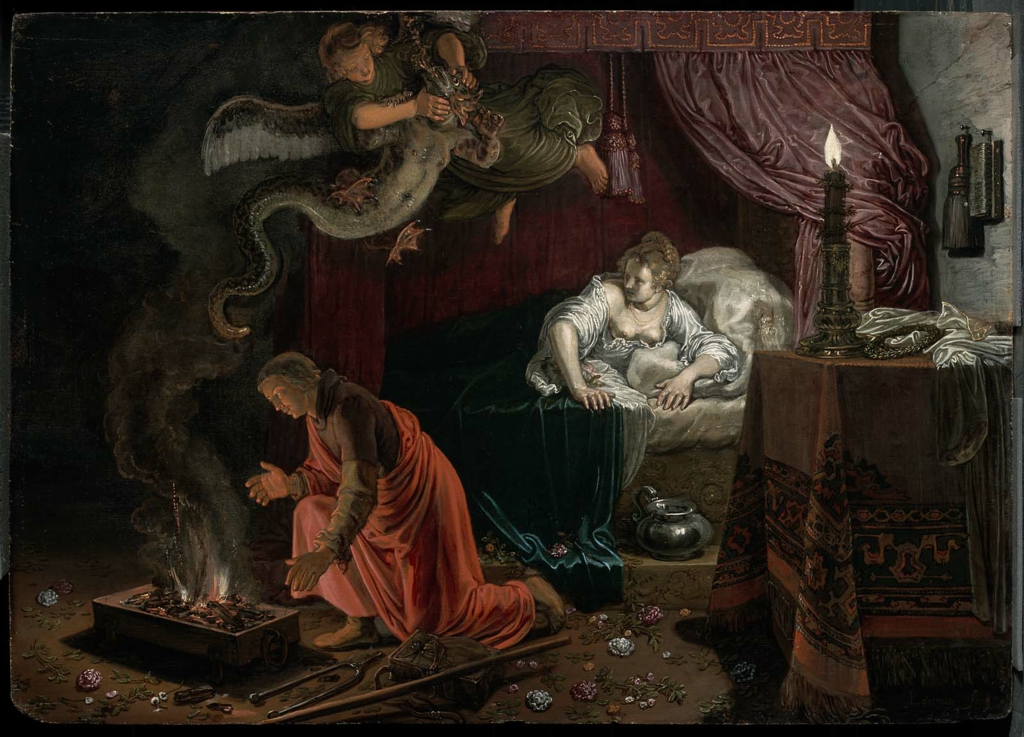
Wedding Night of Tobias and Sarah, 1611, Museum of Fine Arts, Boston

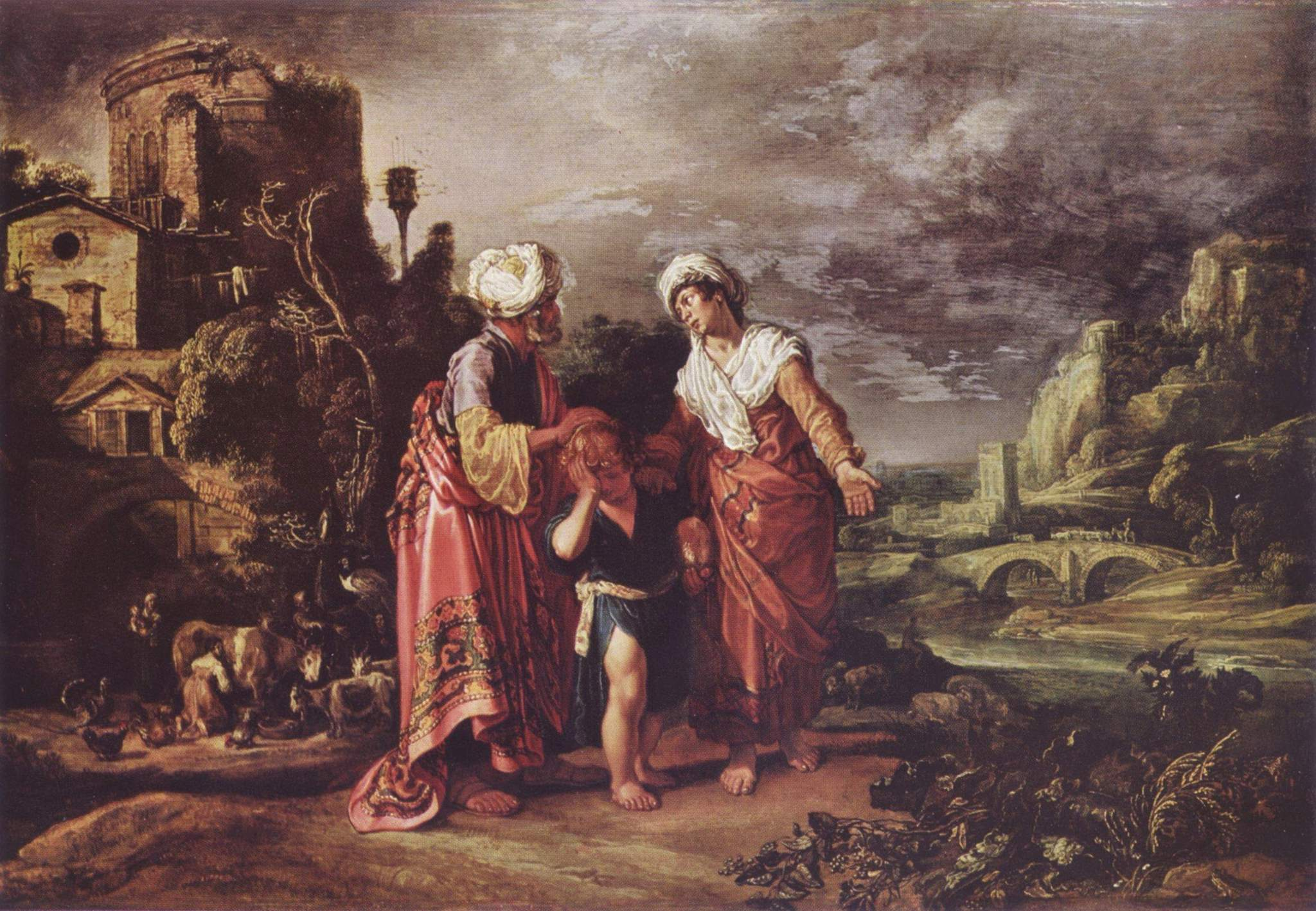
Hagar's Farewell 1612, Hamburger Kunsthalle

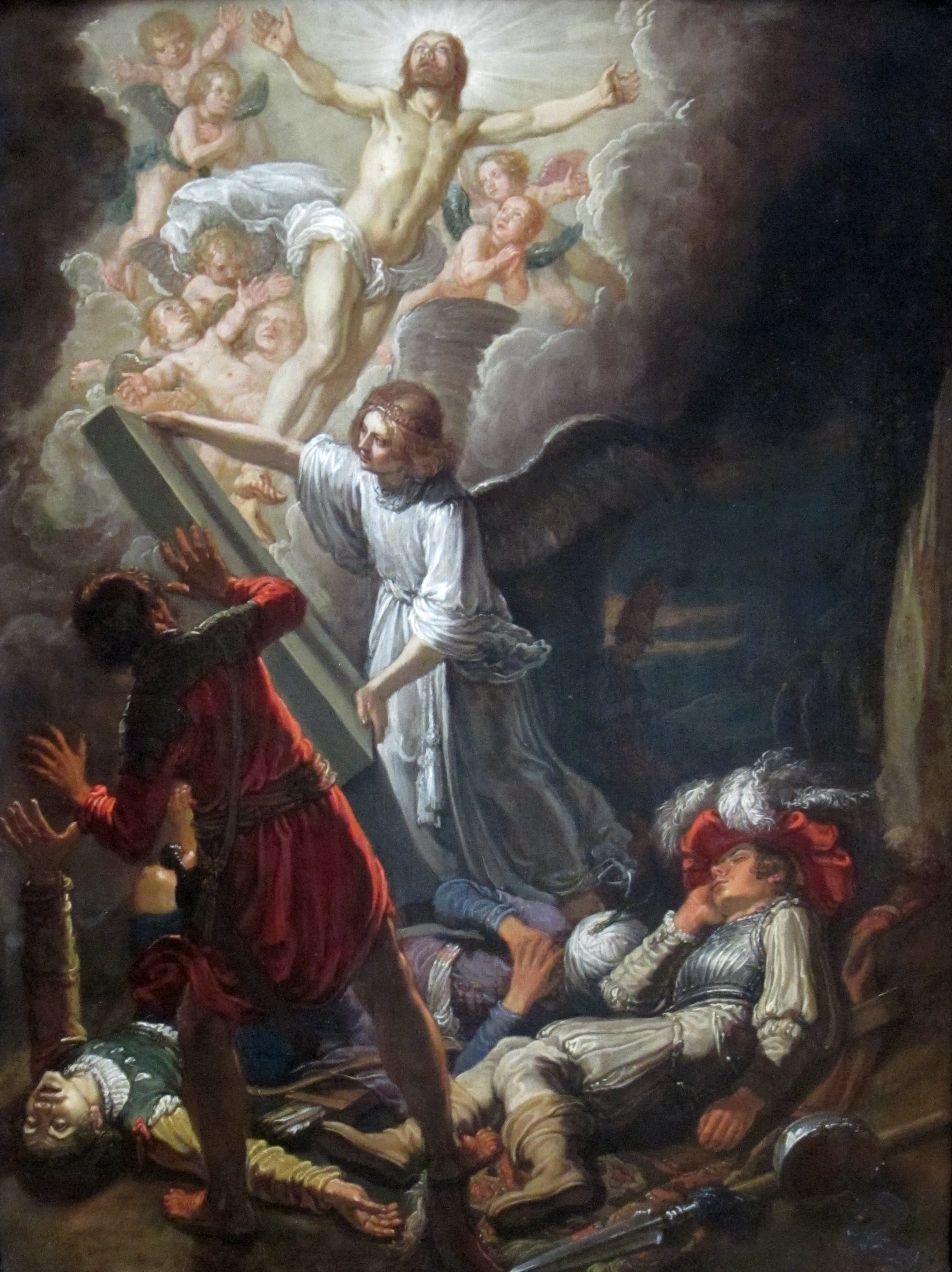
Resurrection 1612, Getty Center

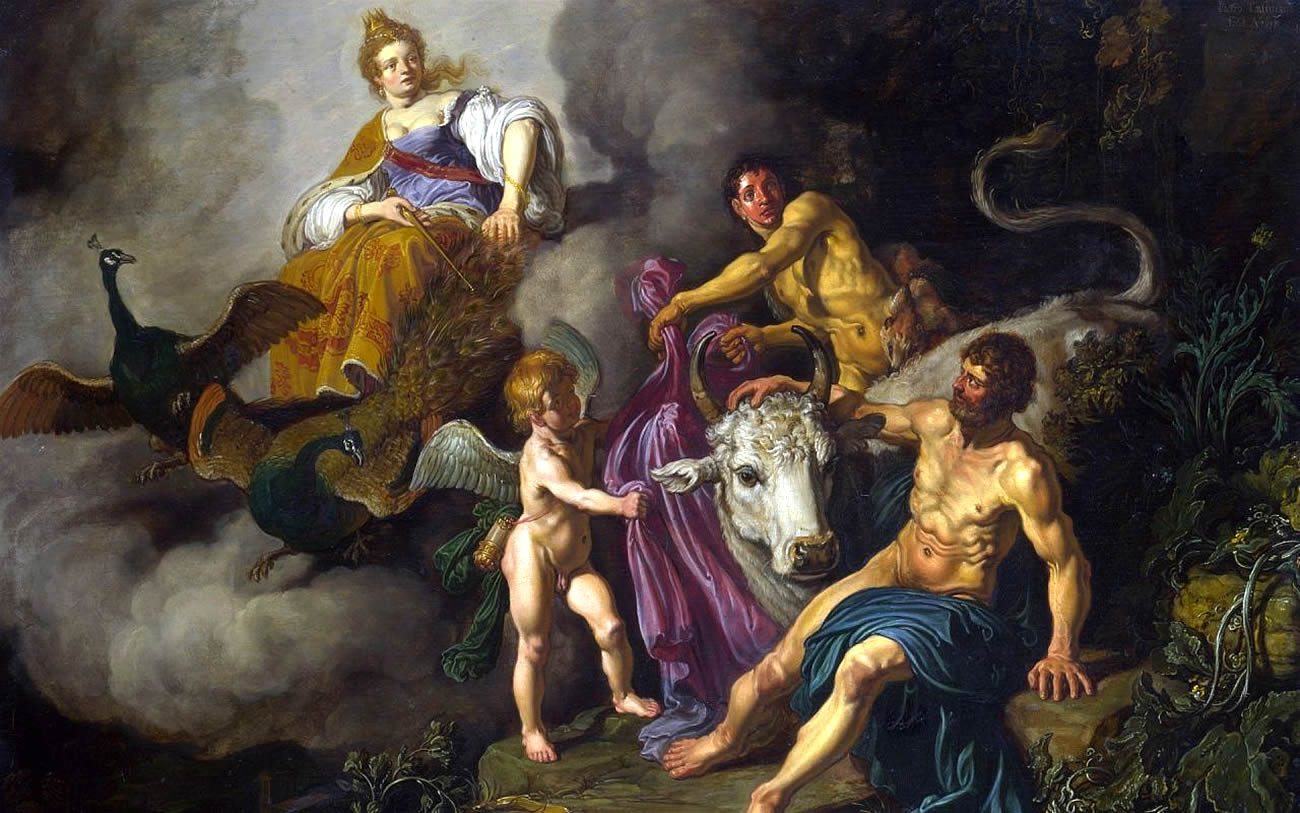
Juno Discovering Jupiter with Io, 1618, National Gallery

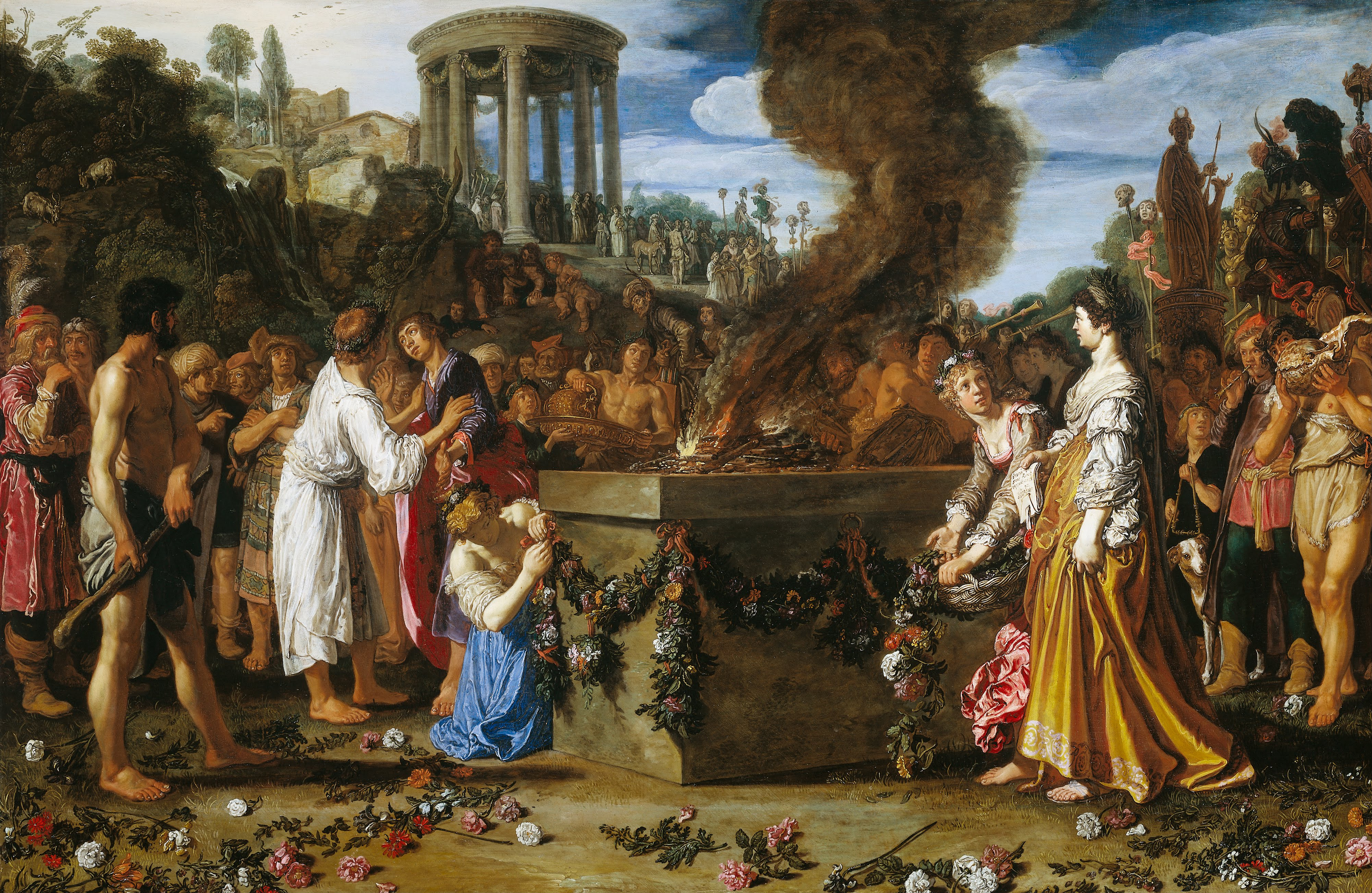
Orestes and Pylades Disputing at the Altar, 1614, Rijksmuseum

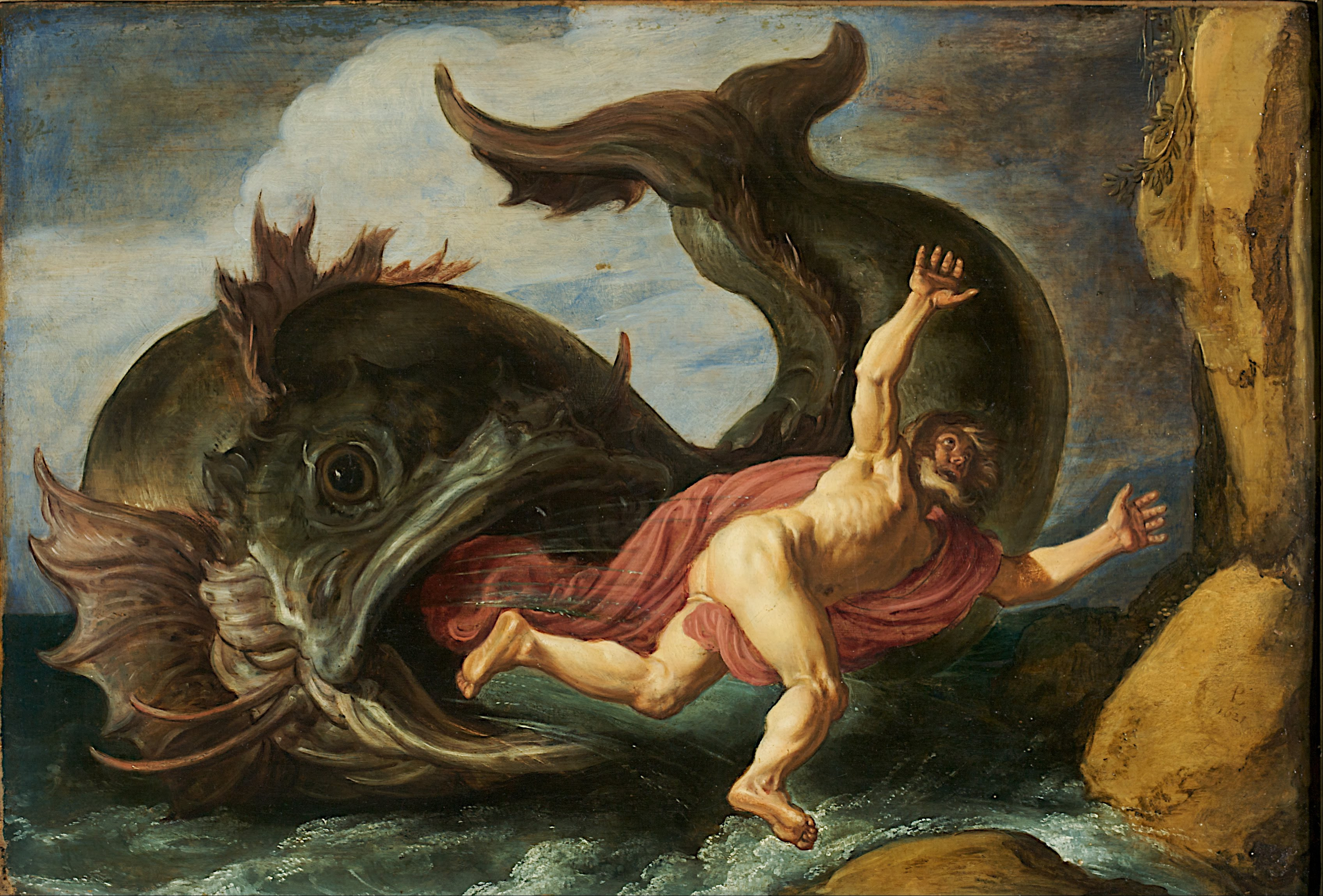
Jonah and the Whale, 1621, Museum Kunstpalast

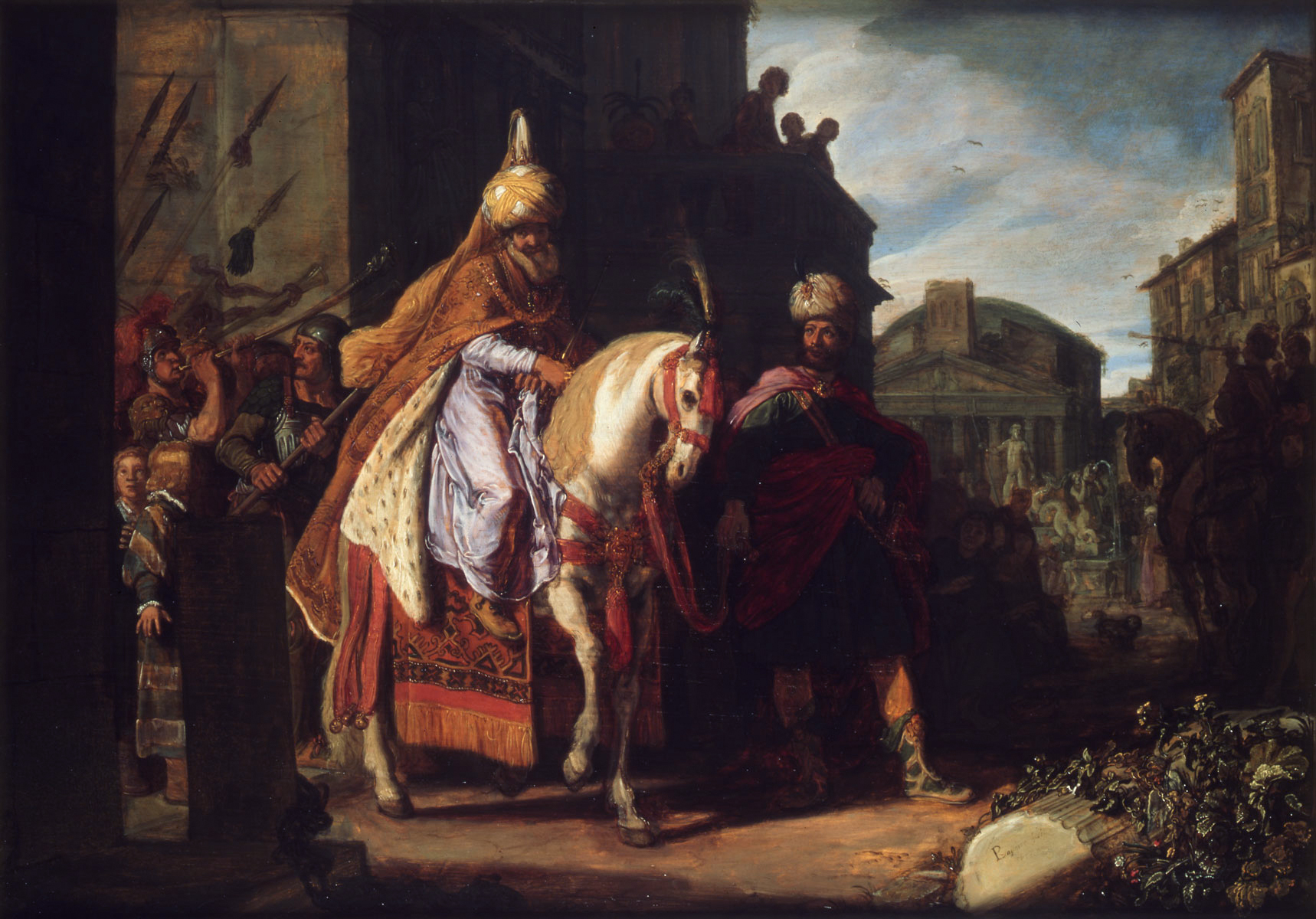
The Triumph of Mordechai, 1624, Rembrandt House Museum

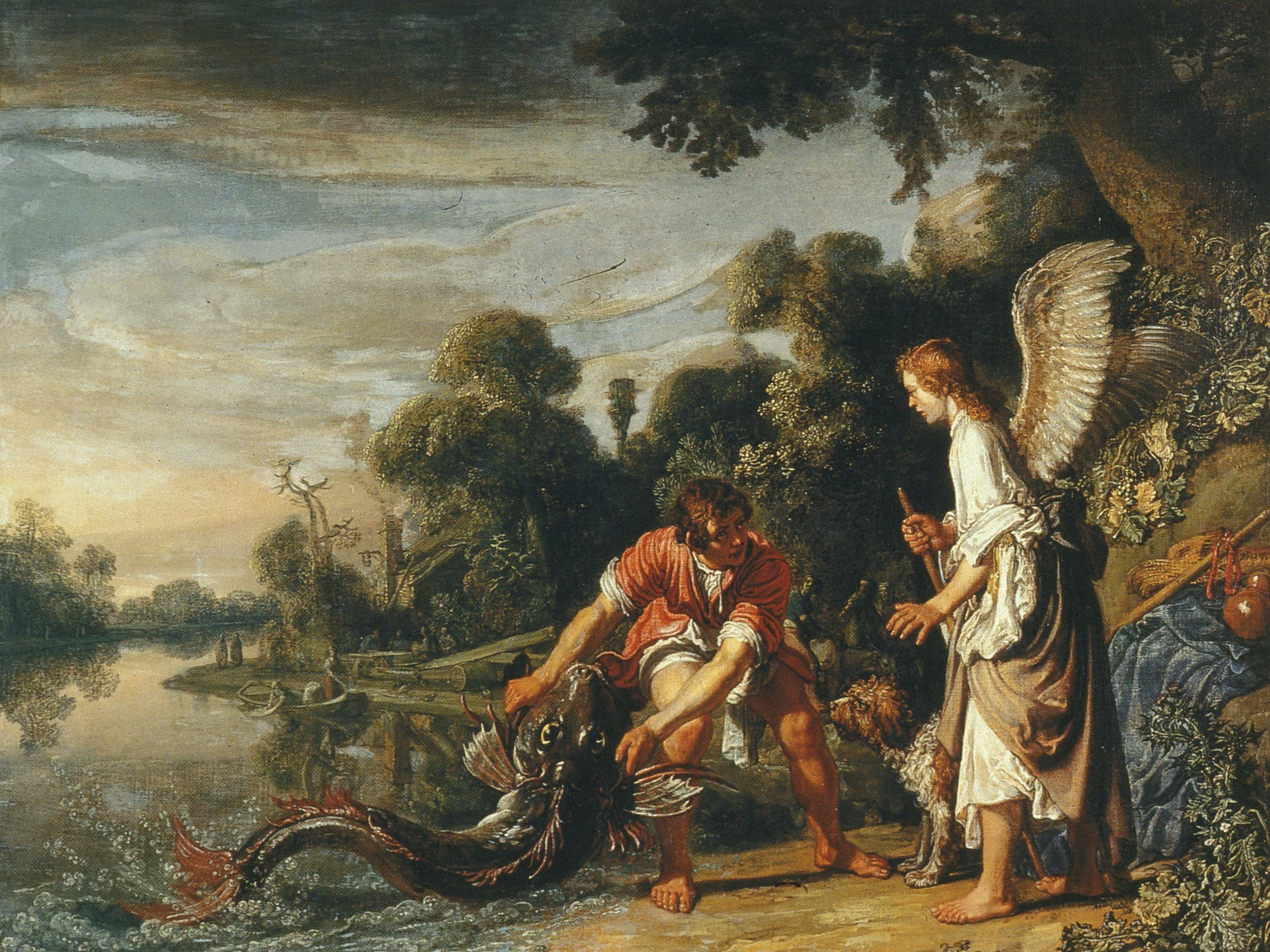
The Angel and Tobias with the Fish 1625, Gemeentelijk Museum Het Princessehof-Leeuwarden

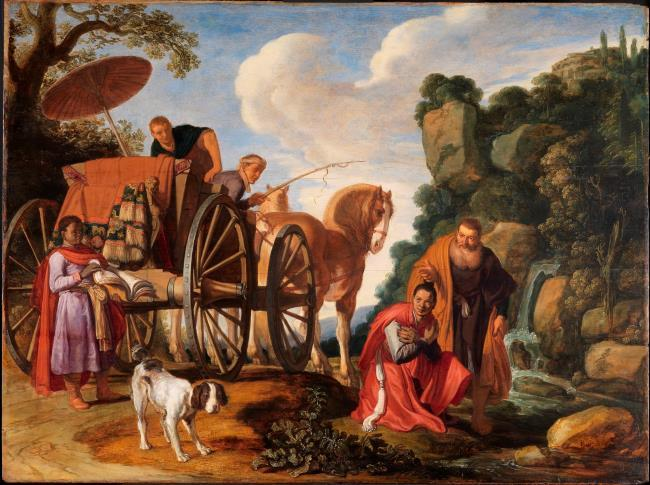
Baptism of the Eunuch (1623)

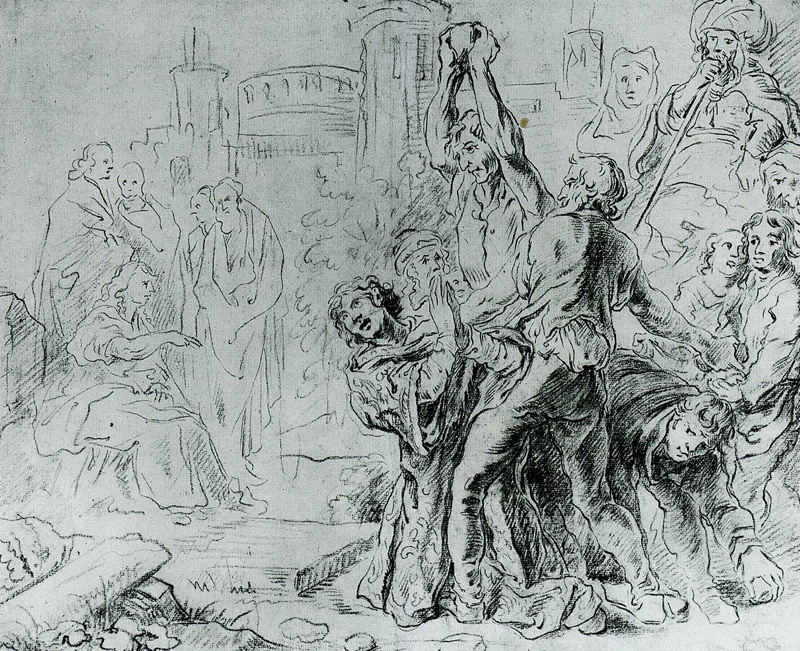
Stoning of Saint Stephen - Drawing

== Additional sources ==
- Murray, P. & L. (1997). Penguin Dictionary of Art and Artists (7th edition), p. 287, 436–438. London: Penguin Books. ISBN 0-14-051300-0.
