= The Great Theatre of Dutch Painters =

Dictionary of artists from the Netherlands by Arnold Houbraken

The Great Theatre of Dutch Painters and Paintresses
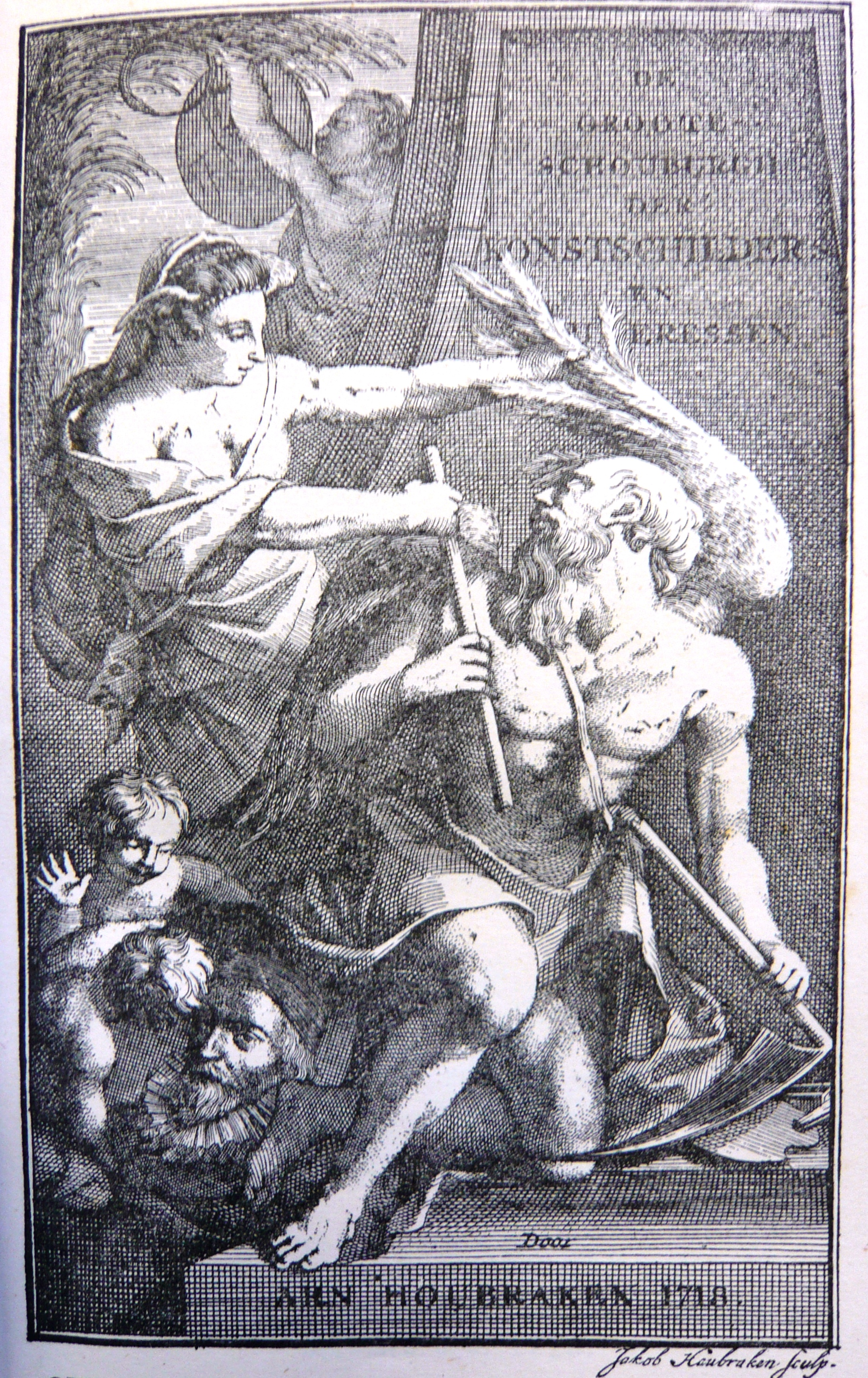
- Title page of the Schouburg with a portrait of Otto van Veen
- Author: Arnold Houbraken
- Original title: De groote schouburgh der Nederlantsche konstschilders en schilderessen
- Language: Dutch
- Subject: Artist biographies
- Publisher: Arnold Houbraken
- Publication date: 1718–1721
- Publication place: Netherlands

The Great Theatre of Dutch Painters and Paintresses, or De groote schouburgh der Nederlantsche konstschilders en schilderessen, as it was originally known in Dutch, is a series of artist biographies with engraved portraits written by the 18th-century painter Arnold Houbraken. It was published in three volumes as a sequel to Karel van Mander's own list of biographies known as the Schilder-boeck. The first volume was published in 1718, followed by the second volume in 1719, the year Houbraken died. The third and final volume was published posthumously in 1721 by Houbraken’s wife and children. This work is considered an important source of information on 17th-century Dutch artists. The Schouburg is listed as one of the thousand most important works in the Canon of Dutch Literature from the Middle Ages to the present day.

== Background and influences ==
The Schouburg was not the first sequel to Karel van Mander's work. Various authors had attempted to illustrate Van Mander's work and in 1649, Jan Meyssen published Image de divers hommes in imitation of Anthony van Dyck's Iconography. Cornelis de Bie published his Het Gulden Cabinet in 1662, André Félibien published his Entretiens sur les vies et sur les ouvrages des plus excellents peintres anciens et modernes in 1666, and these were followed by Jacob von Sandrart's illustrated Teutsche Akademie in 1668. Houbraken referenced Inleyding tot de Hooge Schoole der Schilderkonst, 1678, published by his teacher Samuel van Hoogstraten for students of art. Roger de Piles published L'Abrégé de la vie des peintres in the 1690s followed by Florent le Comte with his Cabinet des singularitez in 1699. As a gifted engraver, Houbraken aimed to address what he perceived as errors and omissions in earlier works, updating biographies with engraved portraits of artists. All of these works were used as sources for Houbraken and he mentions them in the first chapter of his first volume.

The Schouburg was published in three volumes, the first of which was simply meant as an addendum to Karel van Mander's work, and listed about 200 artists born between 1466 (starting with Erasmus) and 1613 (ending with Jacques van Artois) that had been omitted or whose lives extended beyond Van Mander's 1604 publication date. The popularity of this volume was such that a second volume was prepared immediately, while plans were made to continue the project up to the period in which Houbraken was writing at the start of the 18th century.

While leaning heavily on the sources already mentioned, Houbraken is reported to have consulted local history books from various cities in the Netherlands. Other, unpublished sources for his material came from various contacts via his professional network, mostly members of the Guild of St. Luke in Holland. He listed many men who became members of the Bentvueghels group in Rome while on their Grand Tour, but he also listed most of the men in a competency list drawn up by Vincent van der Vinne before he died in 1702. Houbraken used a system in which names in uppercase denoted greater prominence, while lowercase indicated lesser recognition. The index of the first volume is believed to have been incomplete at the time of publication. A later edition of all three books in 1756 contains an improved index and this book is now available online in the Digital library for Dutch literature.

== Characteristic features ==
=== Notable omissions ===
Several painters now considered highly significant are absent or briefly mentioned in Houbraken's work, reflecting differences in artistic priorities between his era and today; the most notorious omission is Jan Vermeer, who is mentioned once in passing. Other notorious omissions are Jan van de Cappelle, Judith Leyster, Jan Wynants, Jacobus Mancadan, and Hendrick Avercamp. While Vermeer, Ruysch, and Leyster are mentioned, they are only briefly touched upon. Only ten women received their own biographies in the work, while fourteen more are mentioned in the biographies of other artists.

However, Houbraken himself died before publishing the final volume, and he repeatedly mentions the impossibility of a complete list. In his first volume he includes painters that he complained were oversights by Karel van Mander, who he regarded as his greatest example. He highly respected all artist biographers who came before him, such as Sandrart, De Bie, and De Lairesse. Houbraken’s work aimed to include overlooked painters and was extensive for its time. Consequently, any omissions reflect not only his but also the omissions of earlier biographers, though Houbraken alone has often been blamed. The exact state of his book at the time of his death is unknown: his son Jacob, his daughter Antonina, and his wife all assisted in preparing it for publication, and it is quite possible that their own perspectives influenced the final work.

=== Biases ===
In general, Houbraken tends to follow the contemporary prejudices of the hierarchy of genres and undervalues landscapists, marine artists and painters of still life.

The Houbraken family appeared to manifest certain other prejudices or biases. These may be categorised, broadly, as:

- Family dynasties: All painters who made up a family dynasty received extra space in the book. More space was given to the founder of the dynasty than to any other member (note that Houbraken considered himself the founder of his own family dynasty). An example is that though Rachel Ruysch was the most famous painter of her family, Houbraken devotes more space to her grandfather Pieter Post and his brother Frans. Similarly, though Wouter Crabeth II was the most famous painter of the family, Houbraken devotes more space to his illustrious heritage in Gouda, the glass painters Dirk and Wouter.
- Engravers: Houbraken had a business of his own in biographical engravings, and his large family probably all helped in the business, with his son and daughter helping with the oval portraits. Houbraken frequently used reprints to document art provenance, reflecting their significance during his time. He highly respected good engravings. Therefore Houbraken showed a preference for artists skilled in drafting and engraving, reflecting his own professional background, such as Rembrandt and the Visschers. He includes also notes about various publishers and engravers, who did not paint at all.
- Rome: Houbraken had great respect for all artists who took the trouble and overcame many hardships to travel to Rome. He went to great pains to add entries for the entire list of painters mentioned in a poem about the Bentvueghels.
- Flattery: As a Mennonite, despite his Mennonite background, Houbraken emphasized the practical importance of flattering patrons in his books, and a recurring theme is when an artist fell onto bad times because he failed to flatter his patron. This type of artist is admired by Houbraken as a sort of "martyr to the artist's cause". Examples of flatterers that Houbraken deprecates are Anthony van Dyck and Sir Peter Lely followers; some omissions in Houbraken's work, such as Adriaen Hanneman Johannes Cornelisz Verspronck and Thomas de Keyser, reflect his selective focus on particular artists and genres. Similarly, though architecture was considered one of the highest genres, the popular "family portrait with a view of the house or garden" was omitted as a genre entirely from Houbraken's praise, since this just showed off the wealth of the sitters. Thus landscape portraitists were often omitted or deprecated, such as Hendrik van Steenwijk II and his wife.
- Religion: While Houbraken did include artists of all religions in his book, his coreligionist Mennonites are over-represented, while Catholics are under-represented. These include the De Grebbers, the De Brays, the Ruisdael family, Jan Vermeer, Adriaen Coorte, Adriaen Hanneman, Johannes Cornelisz Verspronck, Hendrick Dubbels, Pieter Anthonisz. van Groenewegen, and Meindert Hobbema. (Houbraken includes an account of the Mennonite martyr Jan Woutersz van Cuyck).

=== Schilderessen ===
Translated, the title of the book is Theatre of Painters and Paintresses, indicating that Houbraken wrote about women painters or schilderessen. However, the list of women he included in the book is really quite short. Though Houbraken included brief biographies of some women painters, only a select few were named in detail.

- Artemisia Gentileschi
- Anna Francisca de Bruijns
- Mayken Verhulst
- Anna Maria van Schurman
- Margaretha van Godewijk
- Maria de Grebber (sister of Pieter de Grebber)
- Maria Potter
- Alida Withoos
- Catharina Oostfries (from a glass painting family, married glass painter Claes van der Meulen)
- Maria van Oosterwijck
- Geertgen Wyntges (who he mentions as being the servant of Maria van Oosterwijck)
- Anna Katrina
- Catharina Rozee (1632–1682)
- Adriana Spilberg (daughter of Johannes Spilberg)
- Rachel Ruysch
- the three sisters Anna Maria van Thielen, Françoise Katharina van Thielen, and Maria Theresa van Thielen
- Marie Duchatel
- Diana Glauber
- Maria Sybilla Merian
- Margaretha Wulfraet
- Johanna Koerten Blok

Of these, he included illustrations of only three women: Schurman, Merian, and Koerten-Blok. Houbraken also mentioned two women poets; Gesina Brit and Catharina Questiers.

== Contents ==
=== Volume I ===
The engraved portraits included as illustrations in Volume I are below, followed by the artists listed in order of appearance in the text. The first illustration is of Houbraken himself.

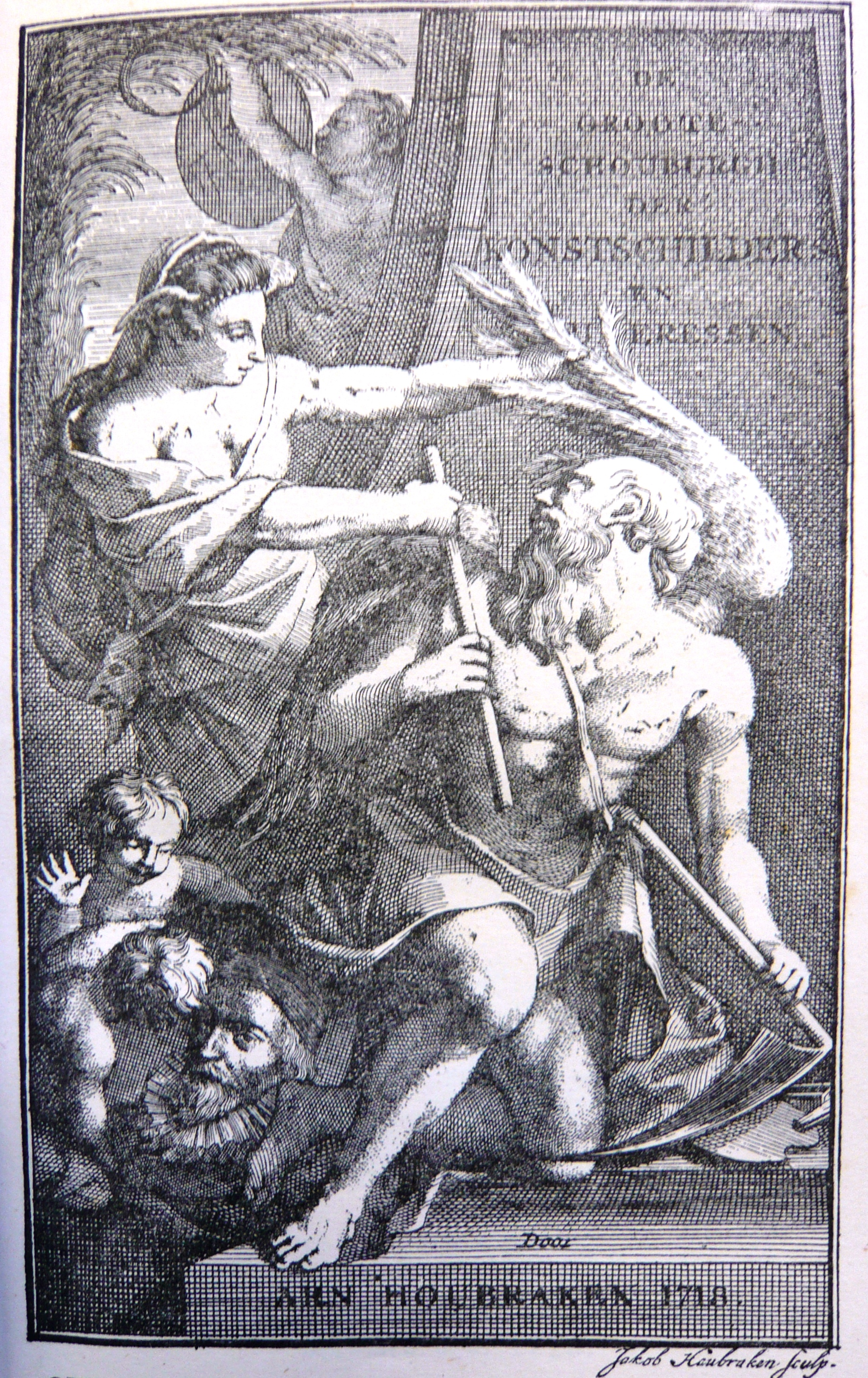
V1 Titlepage with Otto van Veen

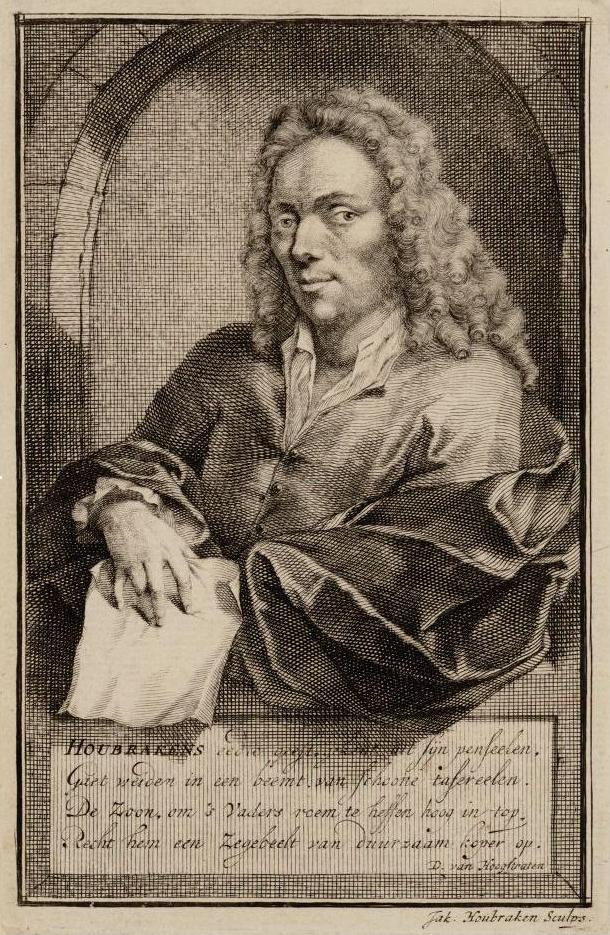
Portrait of Arnold Houbraken, by his son Jacob

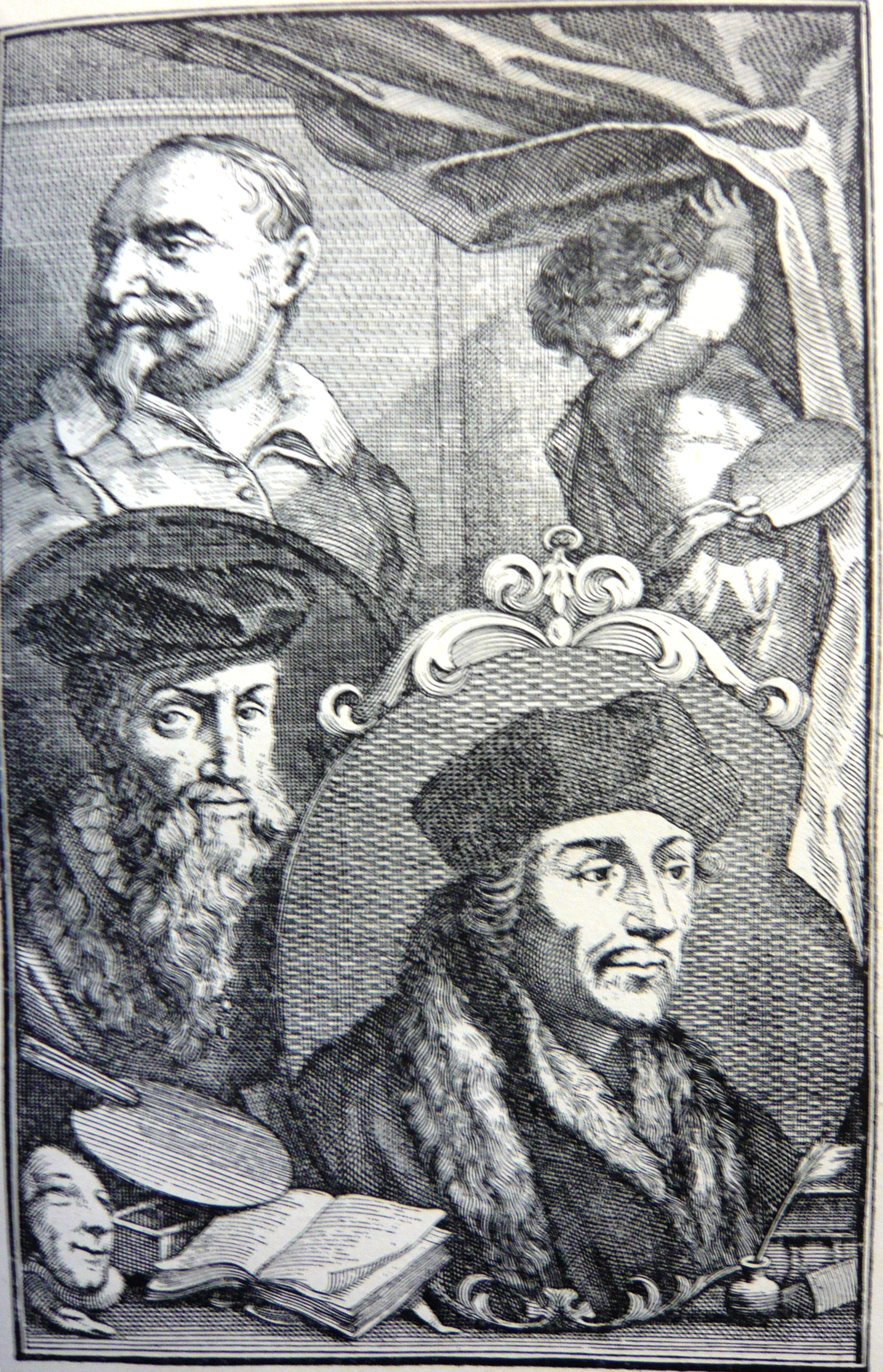
V1 plate A, p 16 Desid. Erasmus. Dav. Joris. Johan Snellings.

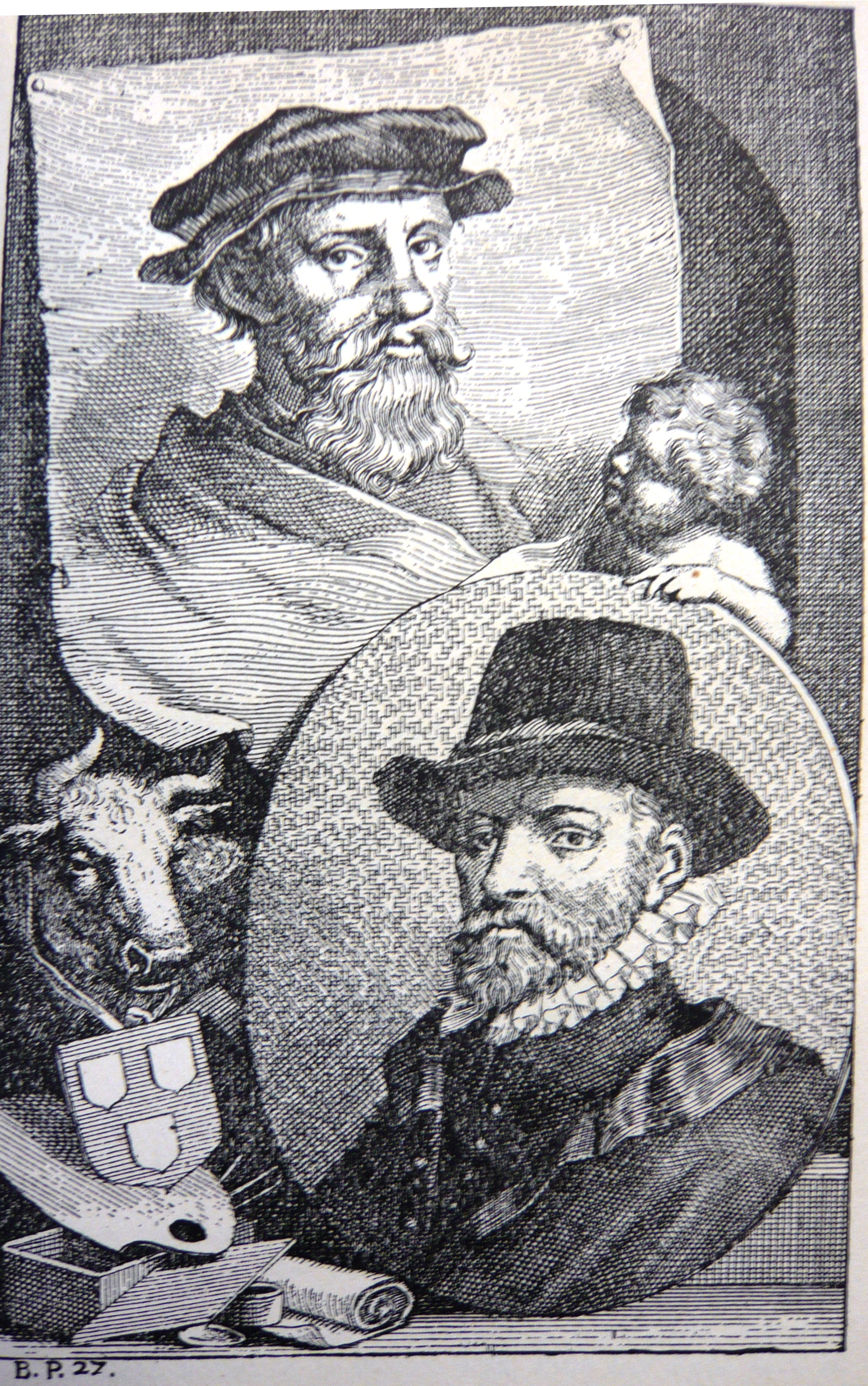
V1 plate B, p 26 Dirk Crabet. Wouter Crabet.

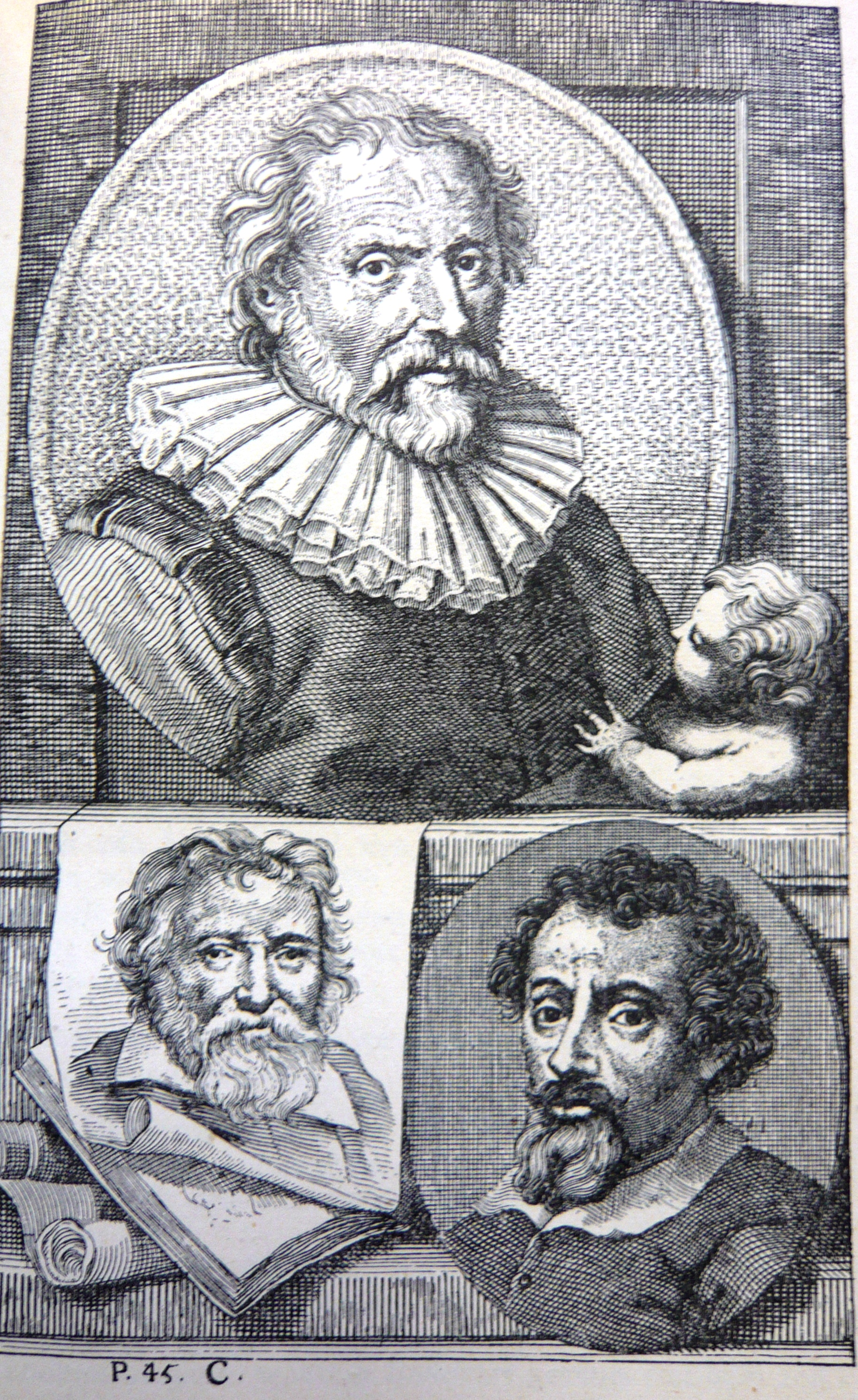
V1 plate C, p 44 Abr. Bloemaart. Ad. Elshaimer. Ad. van Oort.

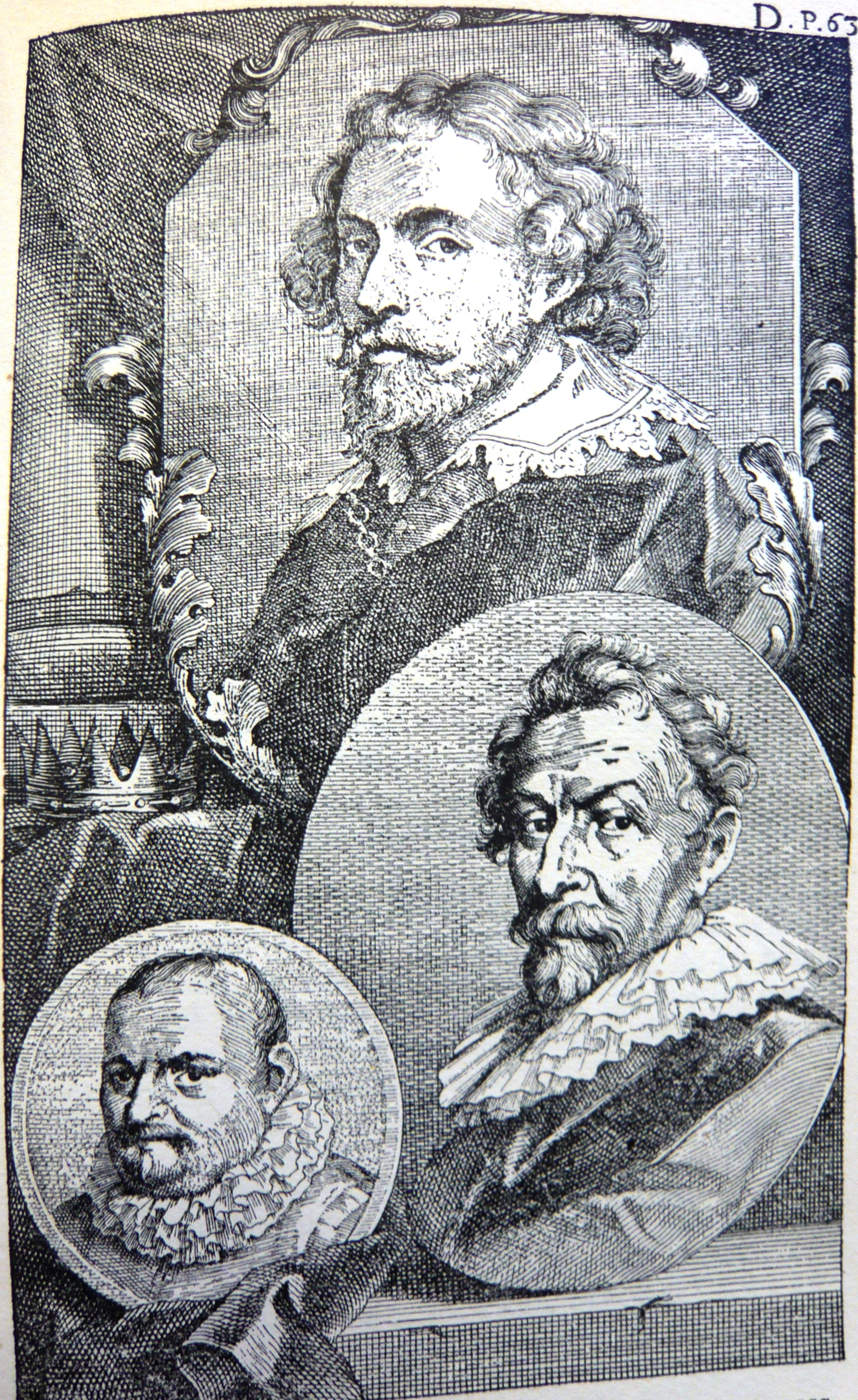
V1 plate D, p 62 P.P. Rubbens. Hendr. van Balen. Roel. Savry.

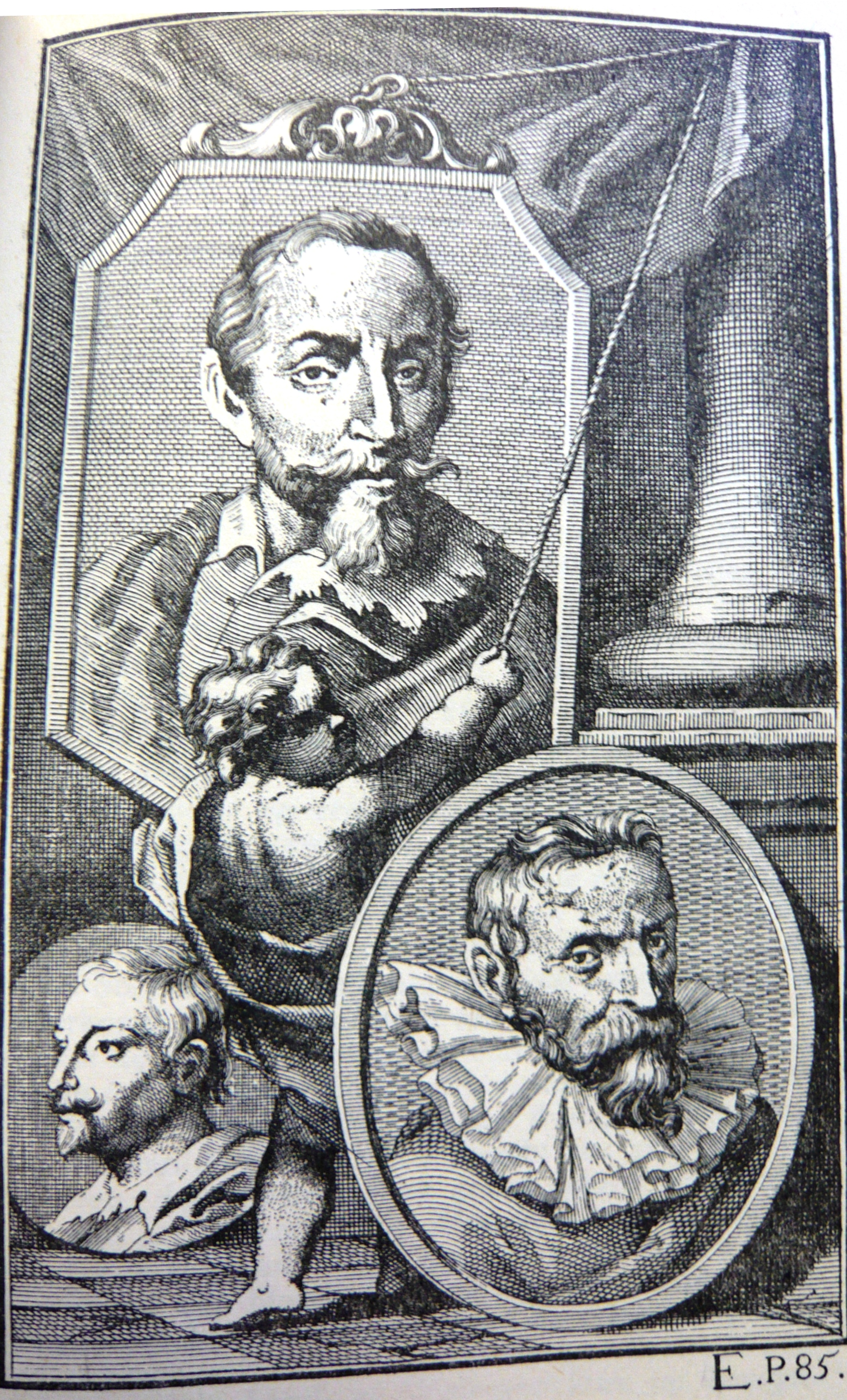
V1 plate E, p 84 Fr. Snyders. Jan Breugel. Korn. Schut.

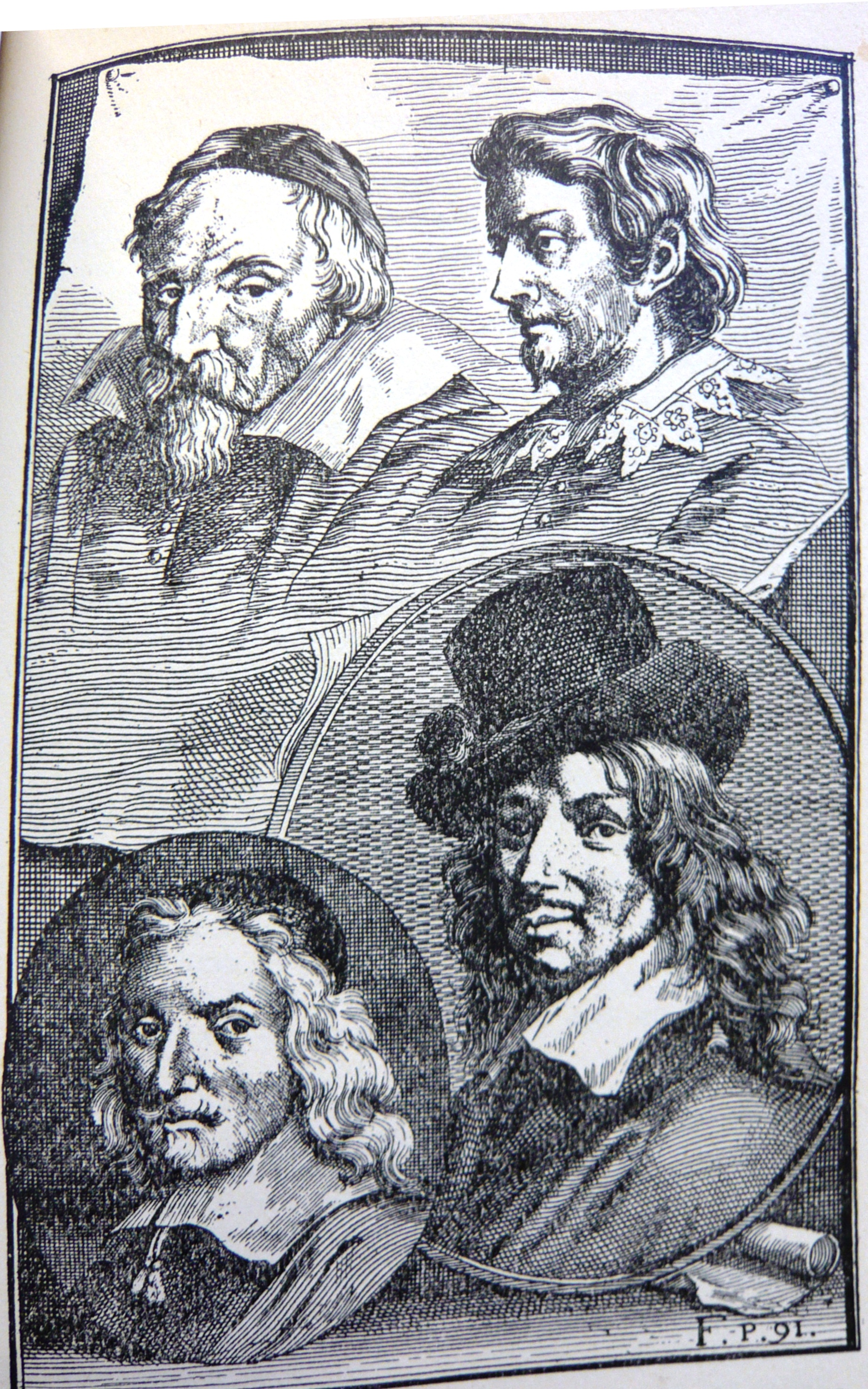
V1 plate F, p 90 Fr. Hals. Wensl. Koebergen. Luc. van Uden. Wybr. de Geest.

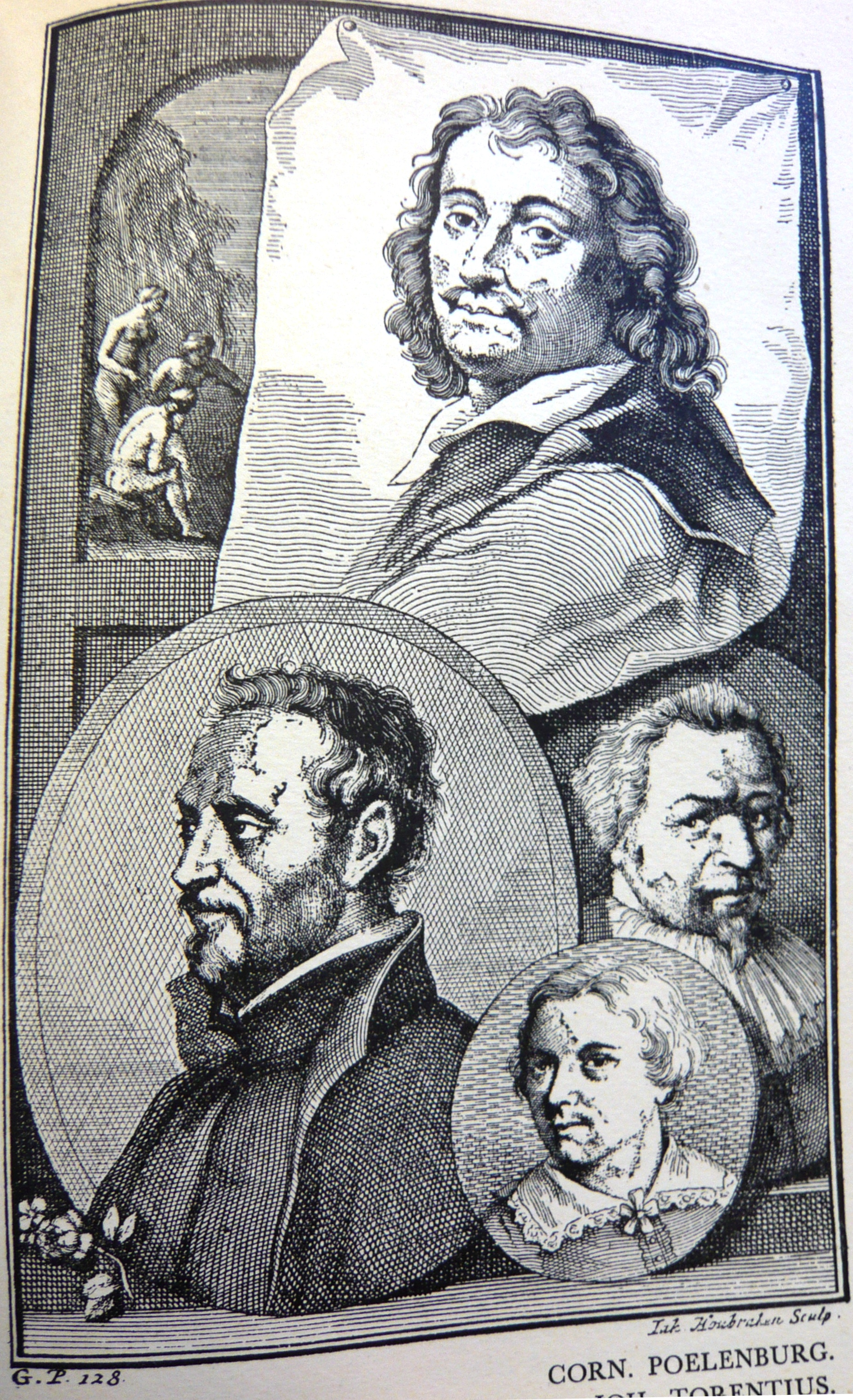
V1 plate G, p 128 Korn. Poelenburg. Dan. Segers. J. Torentius. P. Valk.

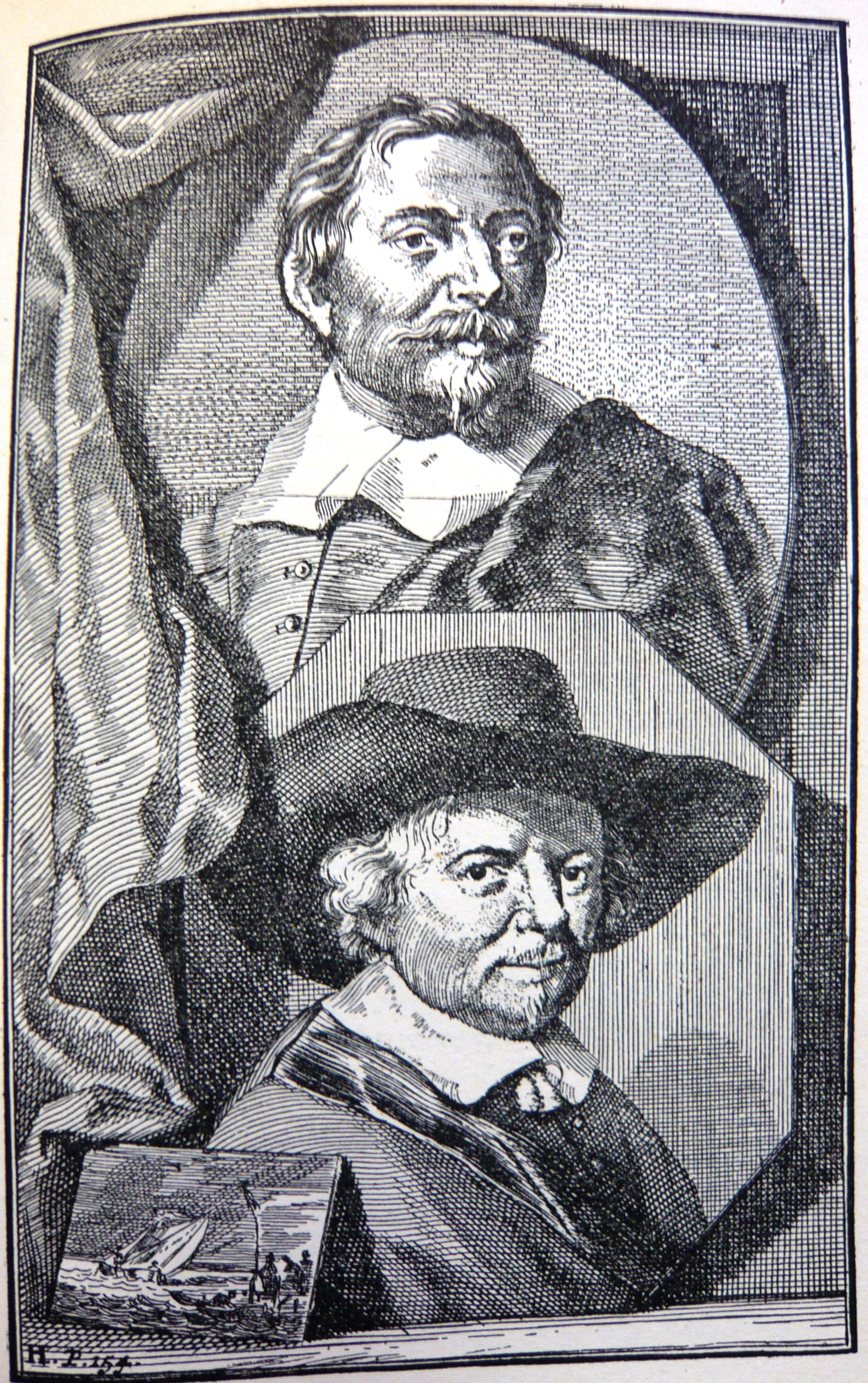
V1 plate H, p 154 Jaques Jordaans. Jan van Goijen.

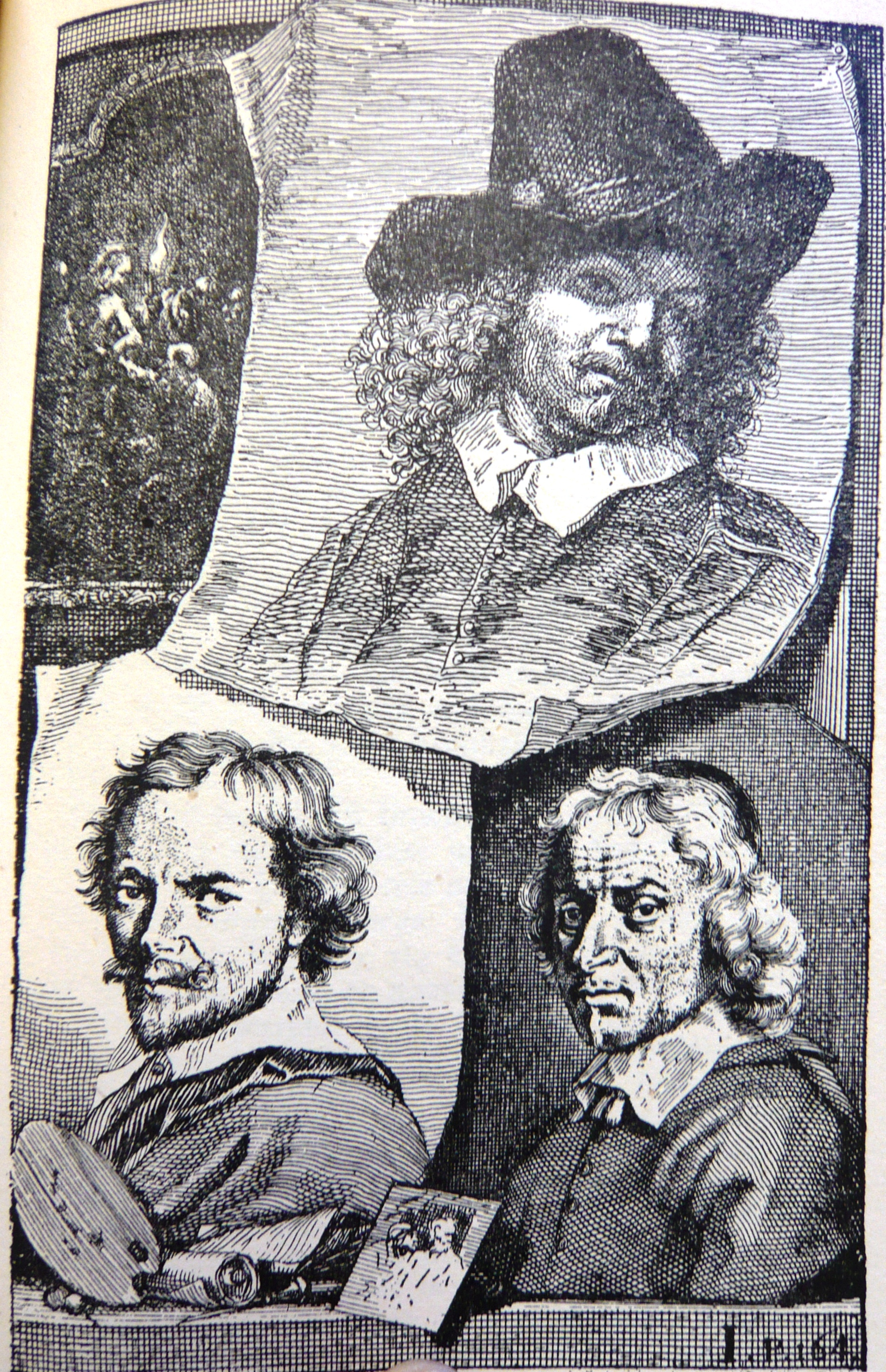
V1 plate I, p 164 L. Bramer. Dirk. v. Hoogstraten. Salom. de Bray.

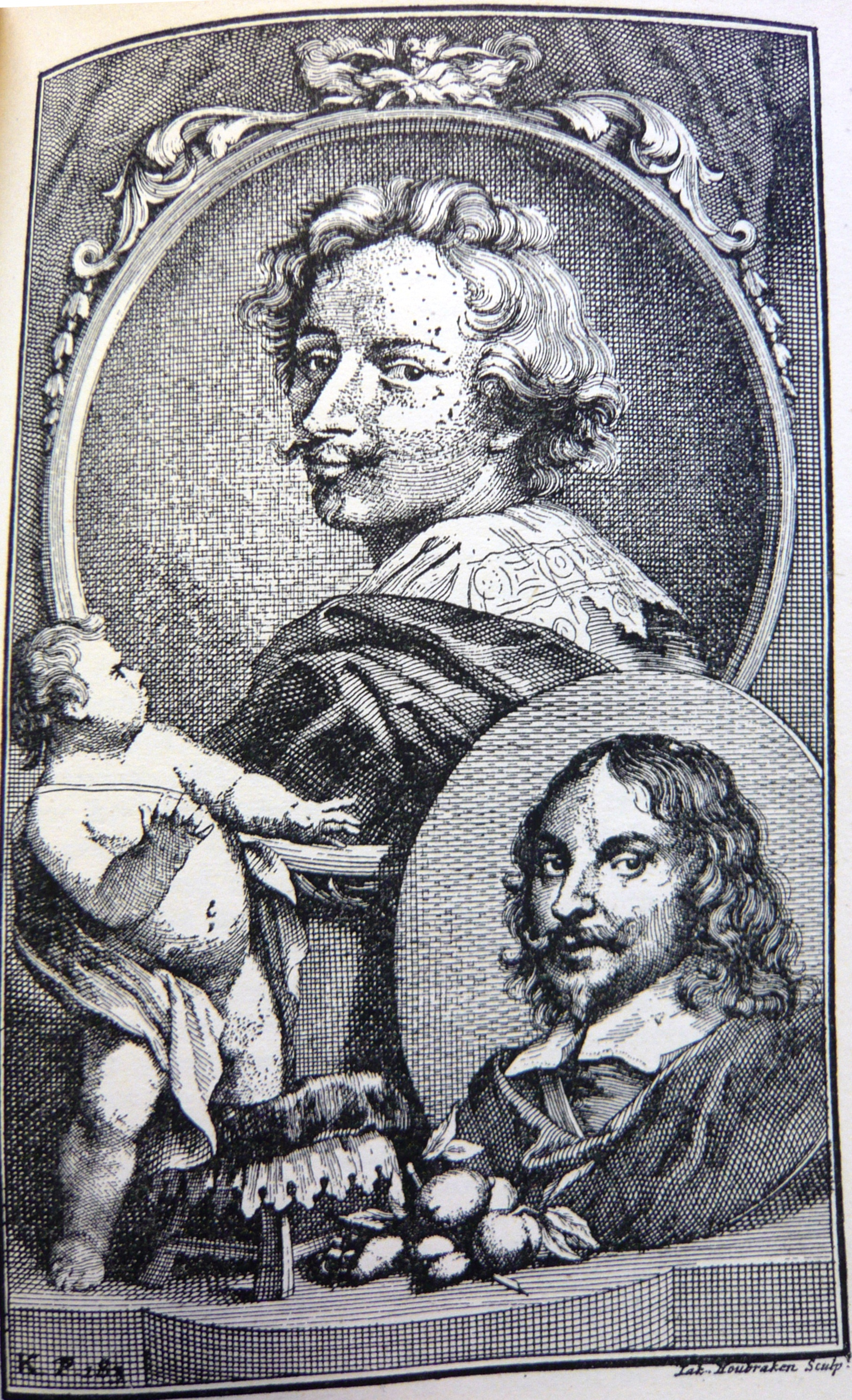
V1 plate K, p 183 Ant. van Dyk. Jan de Heem.

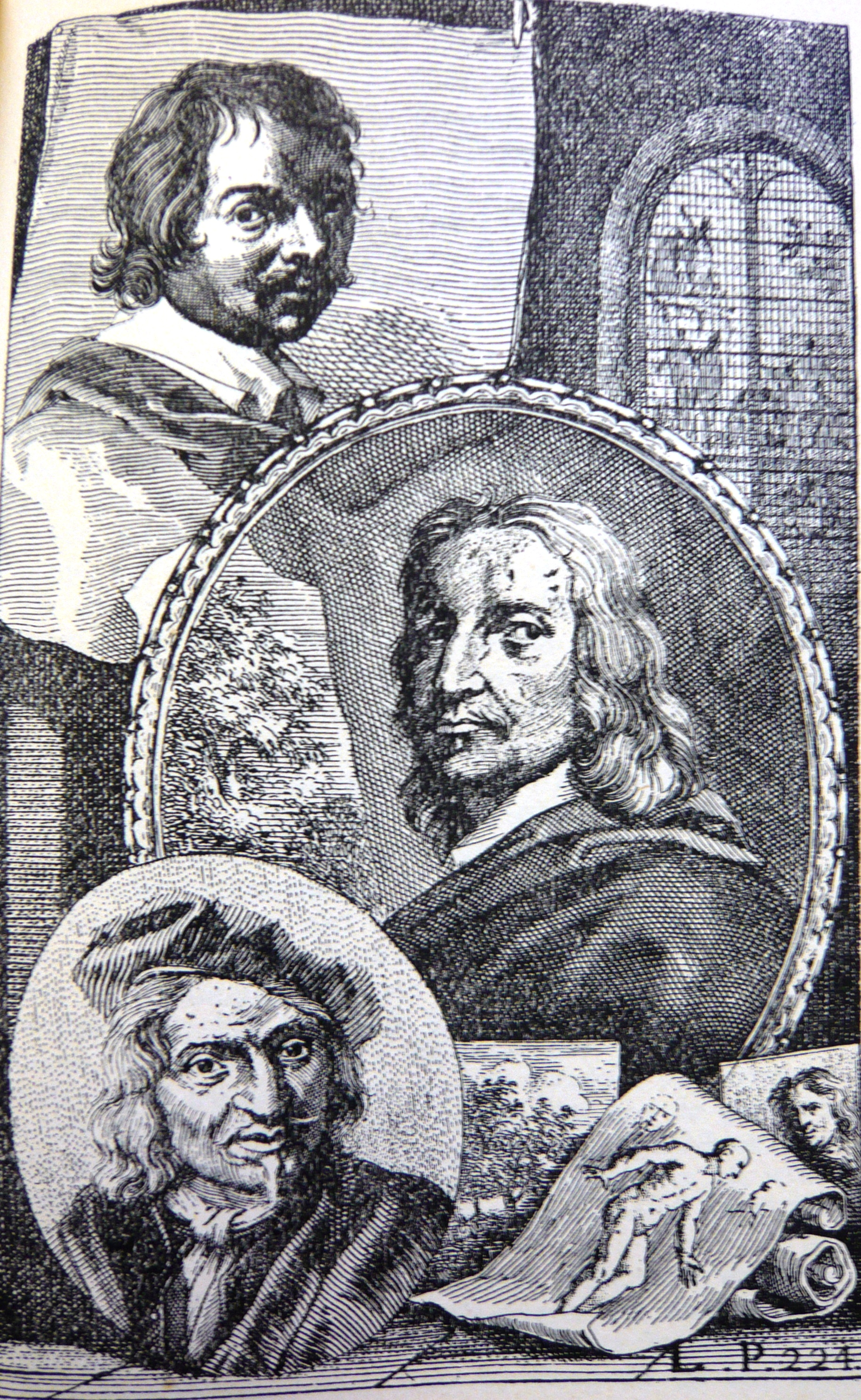
V1 plate L, p 225 Phil. Champanje. P.J.v. Asch. Jan v. Bronkhorst.

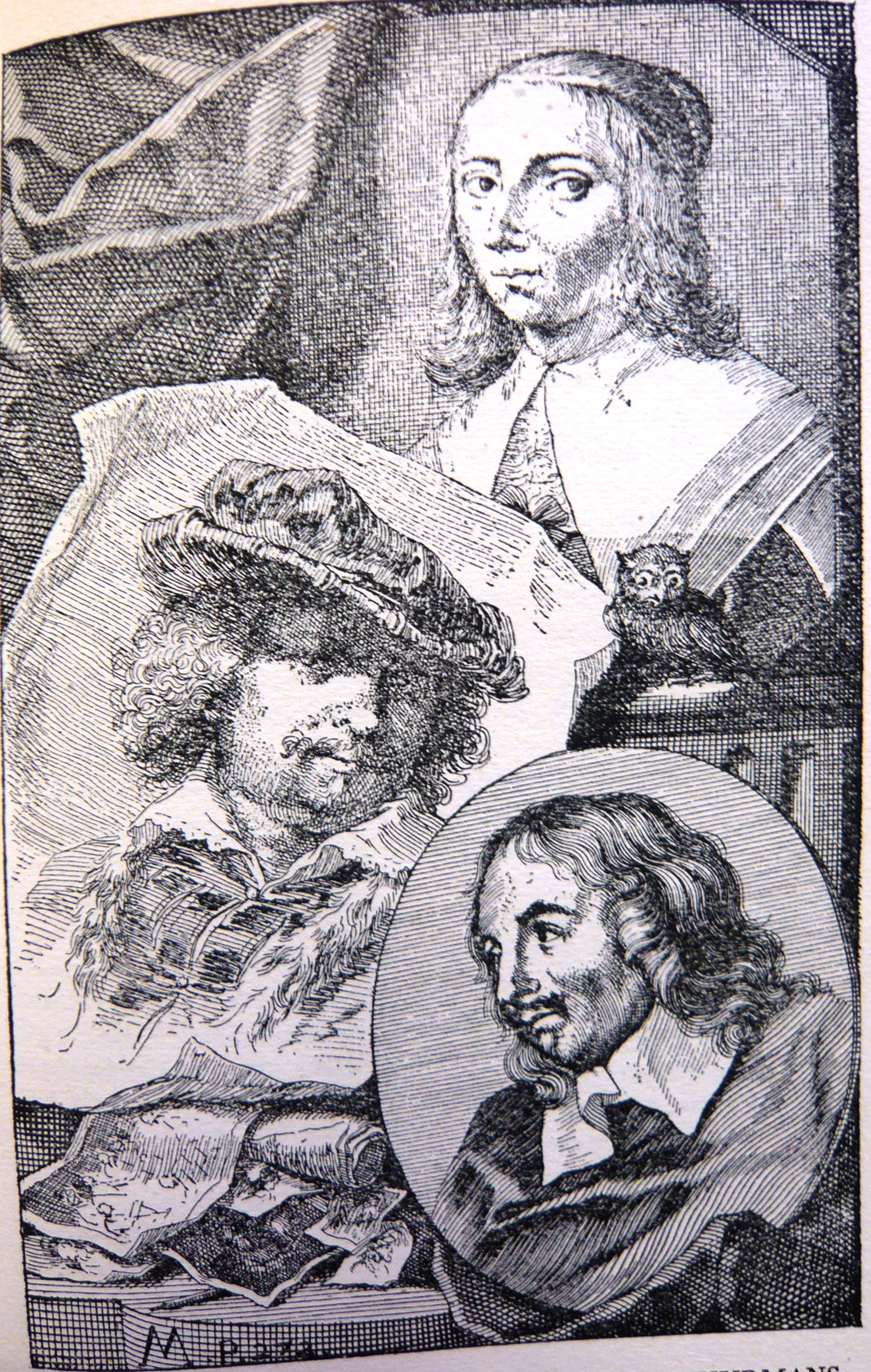
V1 plate M, p 272 Ann. Maria Schuurmans. Jak. Bakker. Rembrant.

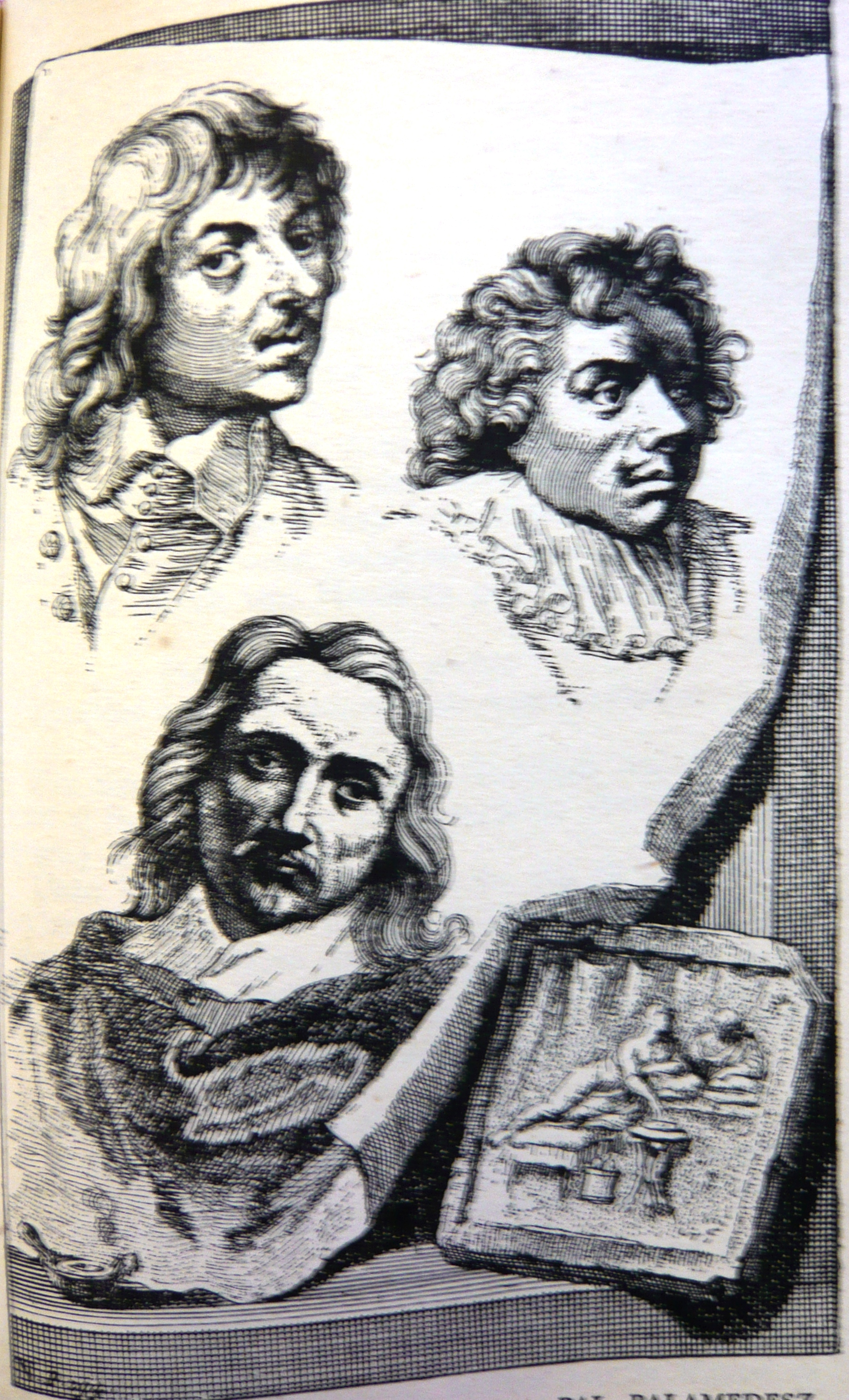
V1 plate N, p 294 Jan Lievens. Palamedes. Erasm. Quellinus.

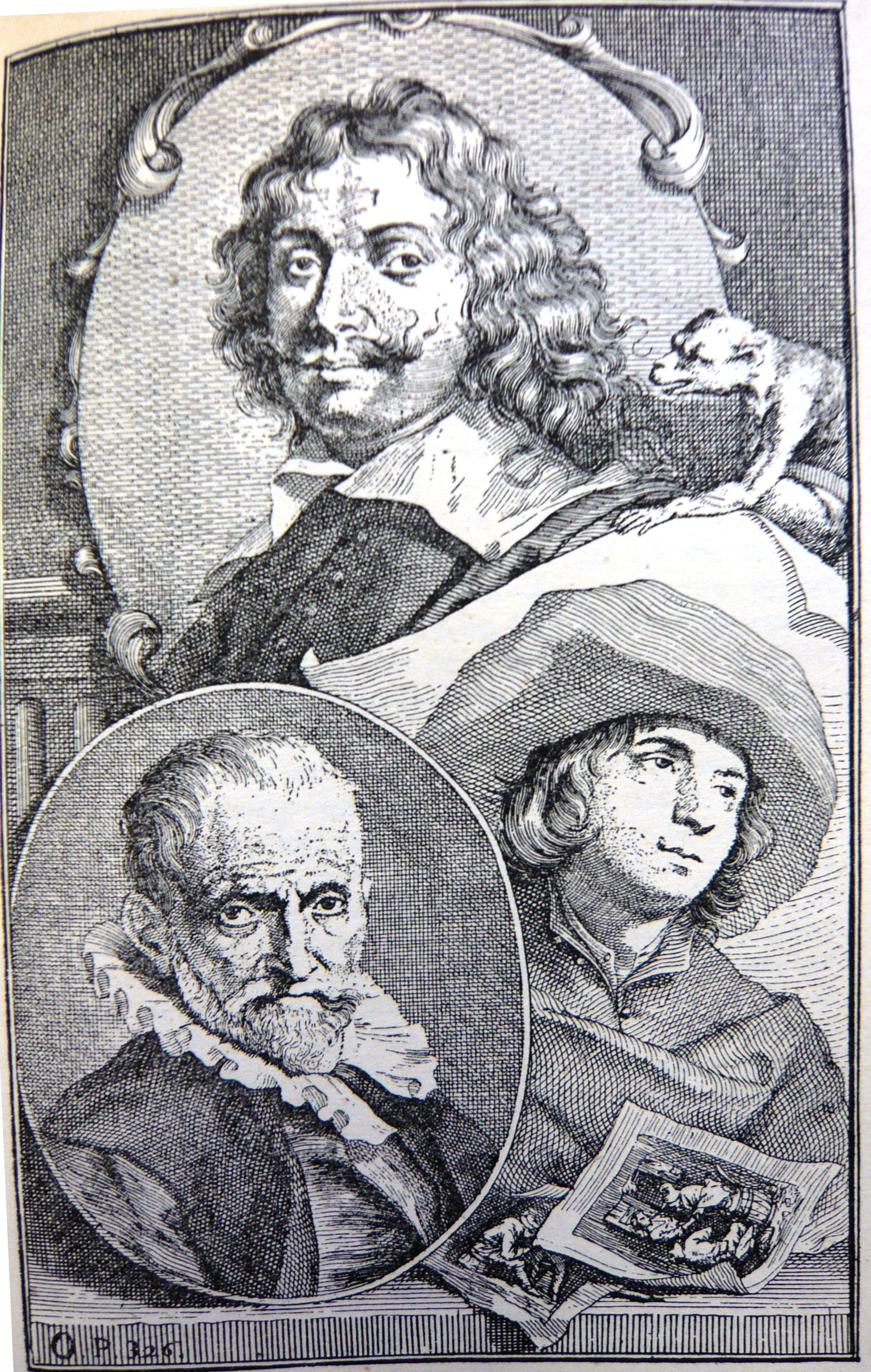
V1 plate O, p 326 Adr. Brouwer. Jurj. Ovens. Korn. Bega.

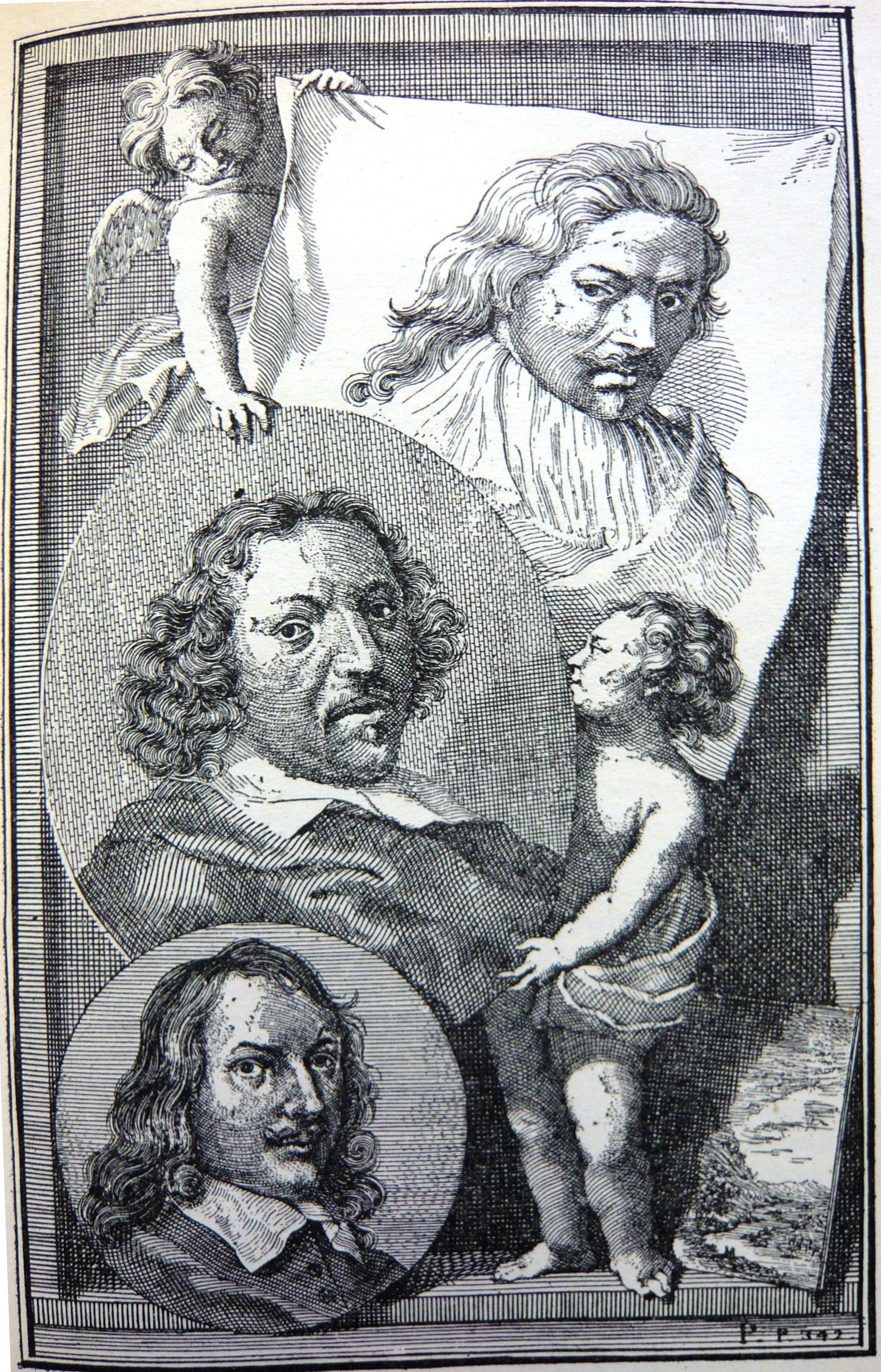
V1 plate P, p 342 Herm. Zachtleven. Korn. Zachtleven. Dav. Teniers.

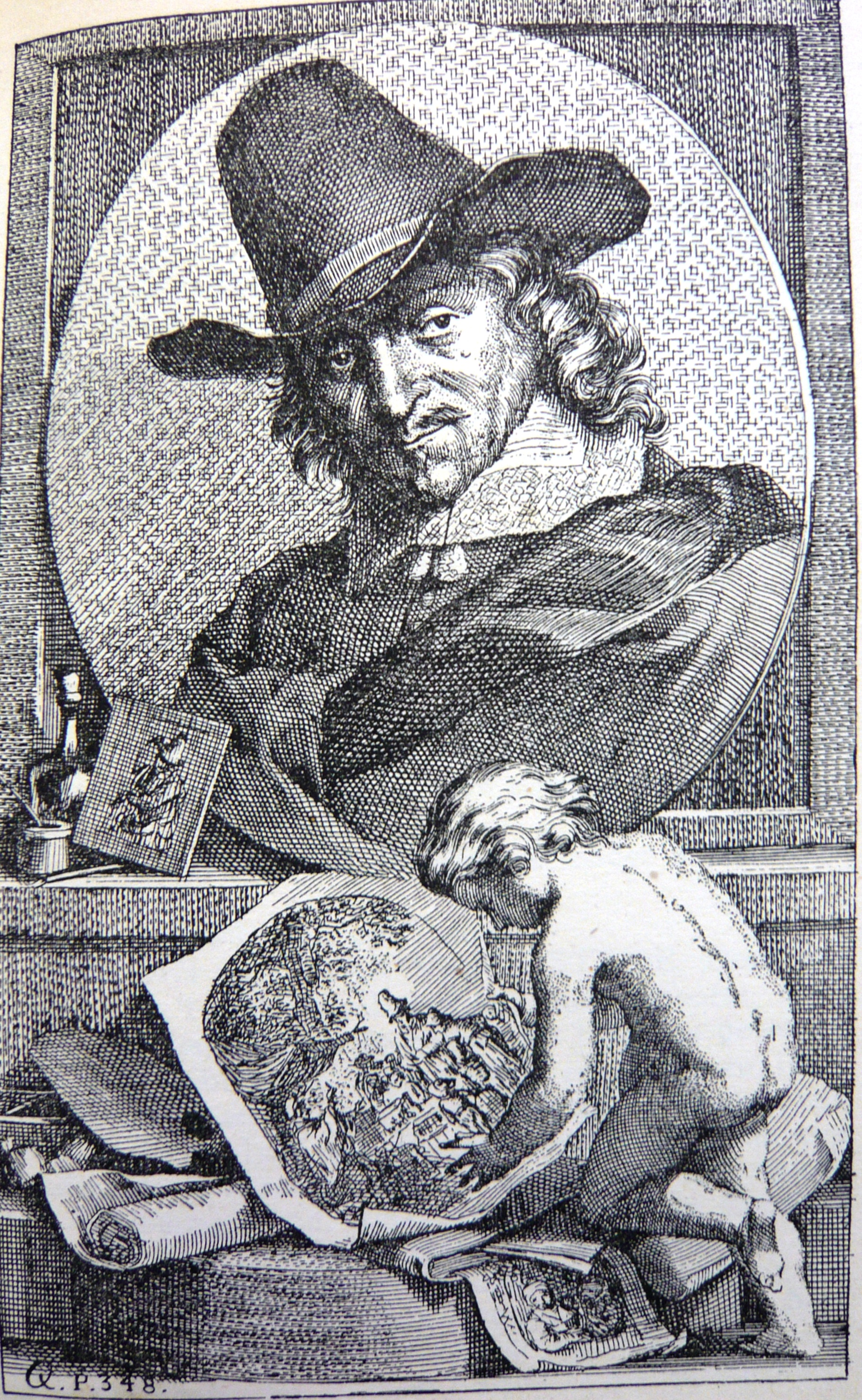
V1 plate Q, p 348 Adriaan van Ostade.

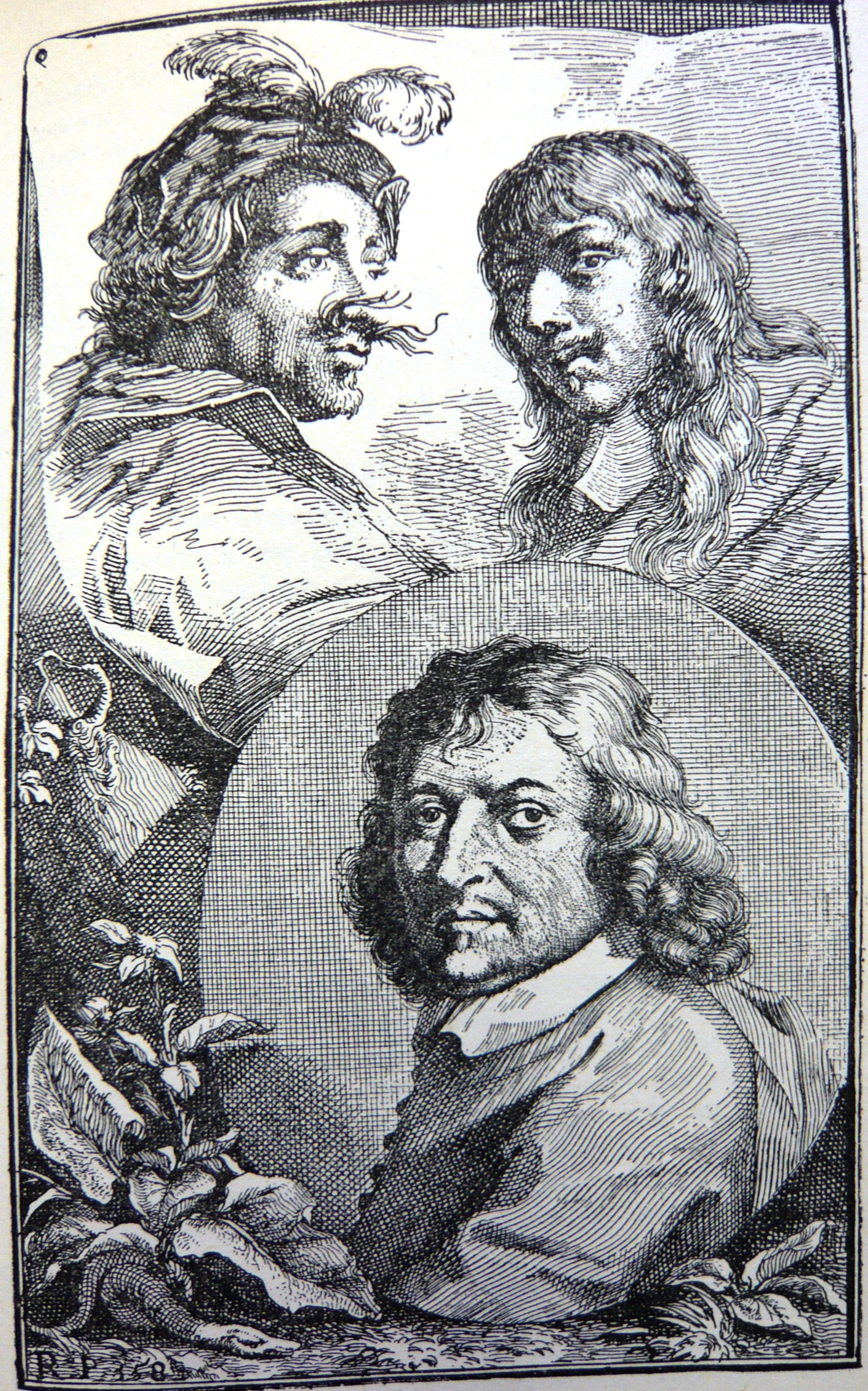
V1 plate R, p 358 Ott. Marcelis. Piet. v. Laar. Nikol. de Helt Stokade

Media related to Schouburg I at Wikimedia Commons

- Desiderius Erasmus
- David Joris
- Cornelis Antonisz
- Jan de Hoey
- Bernard van Orley
- Michael Coxcie
- Dirk Crabeth & Wouter Crabeth I
- Dirk de Vrye
- Joan Dac
- Johannes Snellinks
- Isaac Nicolai
- Adam van Noort
- Otto van Veen
- Jan de Waal
- Adrian Nieuwland
- Abraham Bloemaart
- Tobias Verhaeght
- Michael Mierevelt
- Paulus Moreelse
- Jan van Kuik Woutersze
- Sebastiaan Franks
- Adam Elshaimer
- Lucas Franchoys the Elder
- Hendrik Gaud
- Roelant Savry
- Adam Willaarts
- Aart Druivestein
- Jacob Willemsz Delff
- Petrus Paulus Rubens
- Pieter Soutman
- Samuel Hofman
- Jan van Hoek
- Marten Pepyn
- Abraham Janszen
- Horatius Gentilesco
- Hendrik van Balen
- Frans Snyders
- Joan Breugel
- Adrian van Stalbemt
- Daniel Blok
- Frans Hals
- Deodatus del Mont
- Pieter Lastman
- David Teniers
- Hendrik van der Borght
- Wencelaus Koeberger
- David Baili
- Pieter de Valk
- Willem van der Vliet
- Guiliam Nieulandt
- Christiaan Jansz van Biezelingen
- Gasper de Krayer
- Cornelis Poelenburg
- Alexander Keerings
- Joris van Schoten
- Nestus Thoman
- Pieter Feddes
- Hendrik Terbruggen
- Adrian van der Venne
- Johan Torrentius
- Daniel Seghers
- Adriaan van Linschoten
- Lucas de Waal
- Wybrand de Geest
- Gerard Honthorst
- Peter Snayers
- Adrian de Bie
- Christoffel Schovarts
- Cornelis de Wael
- Jacques Jordaens
- Hendrik Berckman
- Lucas van Uden
- Dirk van Hoogstraten
- Jacques Francart
- Pieter Mierevelt
- Leonard Bramer
- Jan van der Brugge
- Jan van Goyen
- Pieter Pietersz Deneyn
- Roelant Rogman
- Pieter Saenredam
- Salomon de Bray
- Adrian van Uitrecht
- Hubertus Grimani
- Anthony van Dyk
- Jodocus de Momper
- Johannes van Ravesteyn, Cornelis de Vos, Adam de Koster, Daniel Mytens, Artus Wolfart, Theodorus van Loon
- Jan Lis
- Joan de Heem
- Johan Parcellus
- Jan Pinas & Jacob Pinas
- Pieter de Molijn
- Warnard van den Valkert
- Remigius van Rheni
- Lowys de Vadder
- Marten Rykaard
- Andries van Artvelt
- Jacob van Es
- Willem Backereel & Gillis Bakkereel
- Joannes Wildens
- Pieter van de Plas
- Jacobus de Geest
- Pieter Neefs
- Theodoor Babuer
- Cristoffel van der Laan & Jacob van der Laan
- Hendrik de Klerk
- Anthoni Salart
- Justus van Egmont
- Philips de Champanje
- Pieter Koek van Aelst
- Evert van Aelst & Willem van Aelst
- Jan van Bronkhorst
- Nicolaes Knufter
- Johannis Cossiers
- Simon de Vos
- Joan Bylert
- Pieter van Asch
- Kristiaen van Kouwenberch
- Daniel van Heil
- Jacob Gerritsz. Cuyp
- Aelbert Cuyp
- Pieter Dankers de Ry
- Peter Franchoys
- Luigi Primo (Ludowicus)
- Rembrandt van Rijn
- Paudiss
- Frans Wulfhagen
- Juriaan Ovens
- Monniks (Monix)
- Jan van den Velde
- Esaias van den Velde
- Joachim von Sandrart
- Emanuel de Witt
- Pieter van der Willigen
- Abraham van Diepenbeek
- Jan T. van Ieperen
- Theodoor van Tulden
- Paulus de Vos
- Erasmus Quellinus II
- Carel Erpard
- Jan Lievens
- Ferdinand Bol
- Palamedes Palamedesz Stevers
- Anna Maria van Schurman
- Margarita Godewyk
- Adriaen Brouwer
- Joost van Craasbeek
- Jacob Bakker
- Bartram de Fouchier
- Herman Zachtleven
- Cornelis Zachtleven
- Willem van Bemmel
- Salomon Koning
- Jan Baptist van Heil
- Robert van Hoek
- David Teniers
- Adriaen van Ostade & Isaac van Ostade
- Cornelis Bega
- Leendert van der Koogen
- Willem van den Velde
- Johannes Mytens
- Emelraad
- Pieter Janszen
- Thomas Willeborts Bossaert
- Otto Marcelis
- Pieter van Laar
- Nicolas de Helt Stokade
- Abraham Willaerts
- Jacques van Artois

=== Volume II ===
The engraved portraits included as illustrations in Volume II are below, followed by the artists listed in order of appearance in the text.

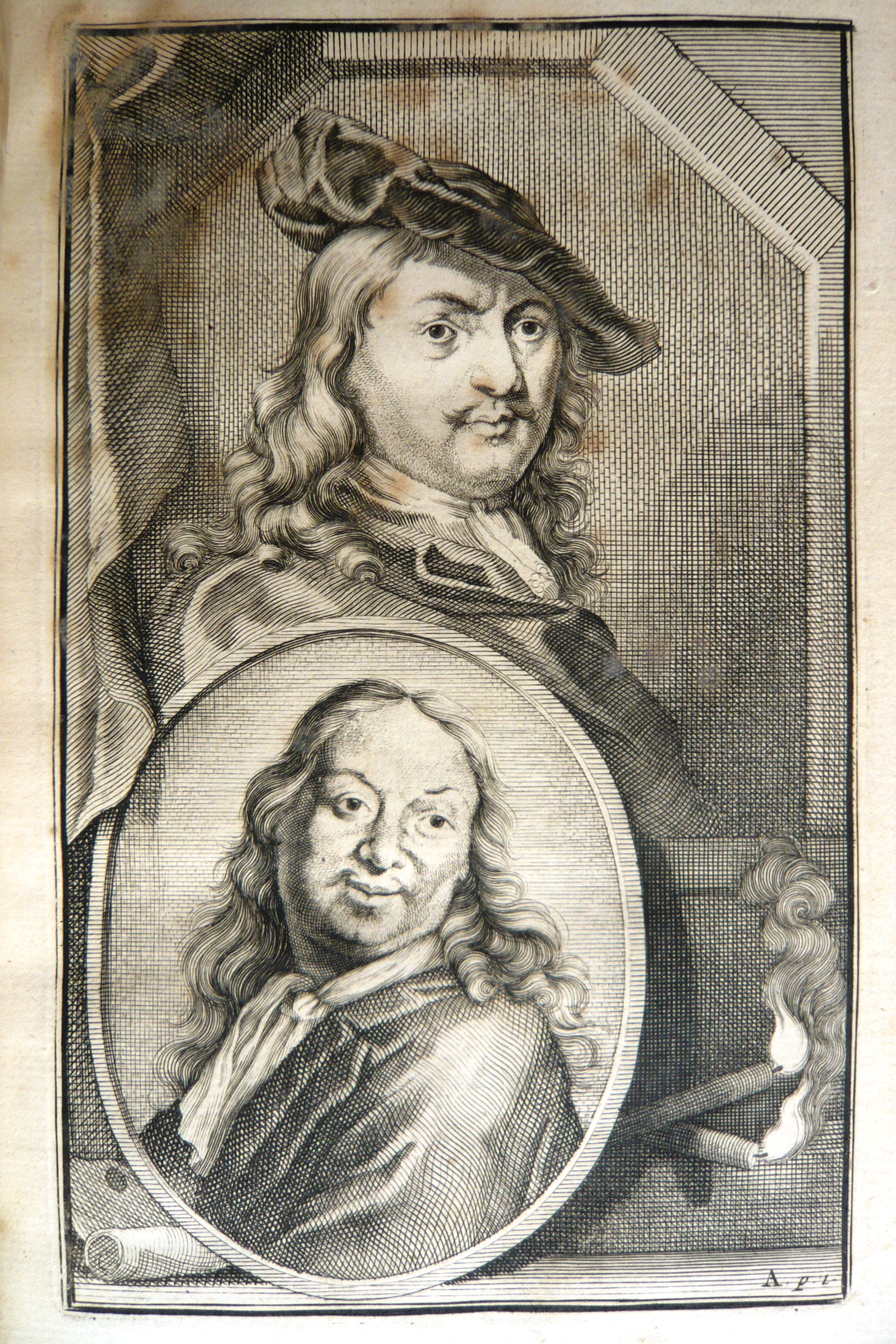
V2 plate A, p 1 Gerard Dou. Bartolom, vander Helst.

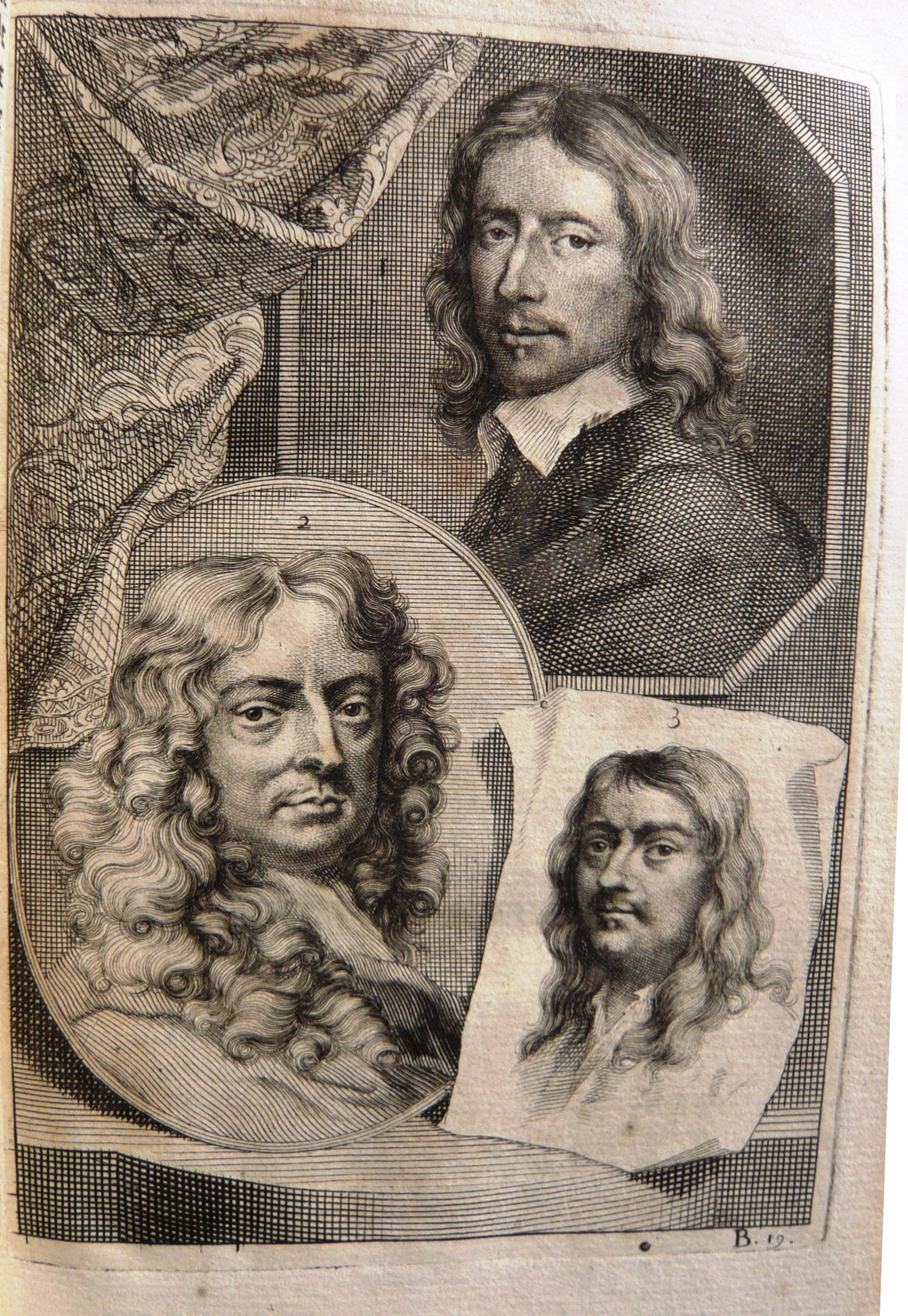
V2 plate B, p 19 Govert Flink. Pieter Lely. Philip Koning.

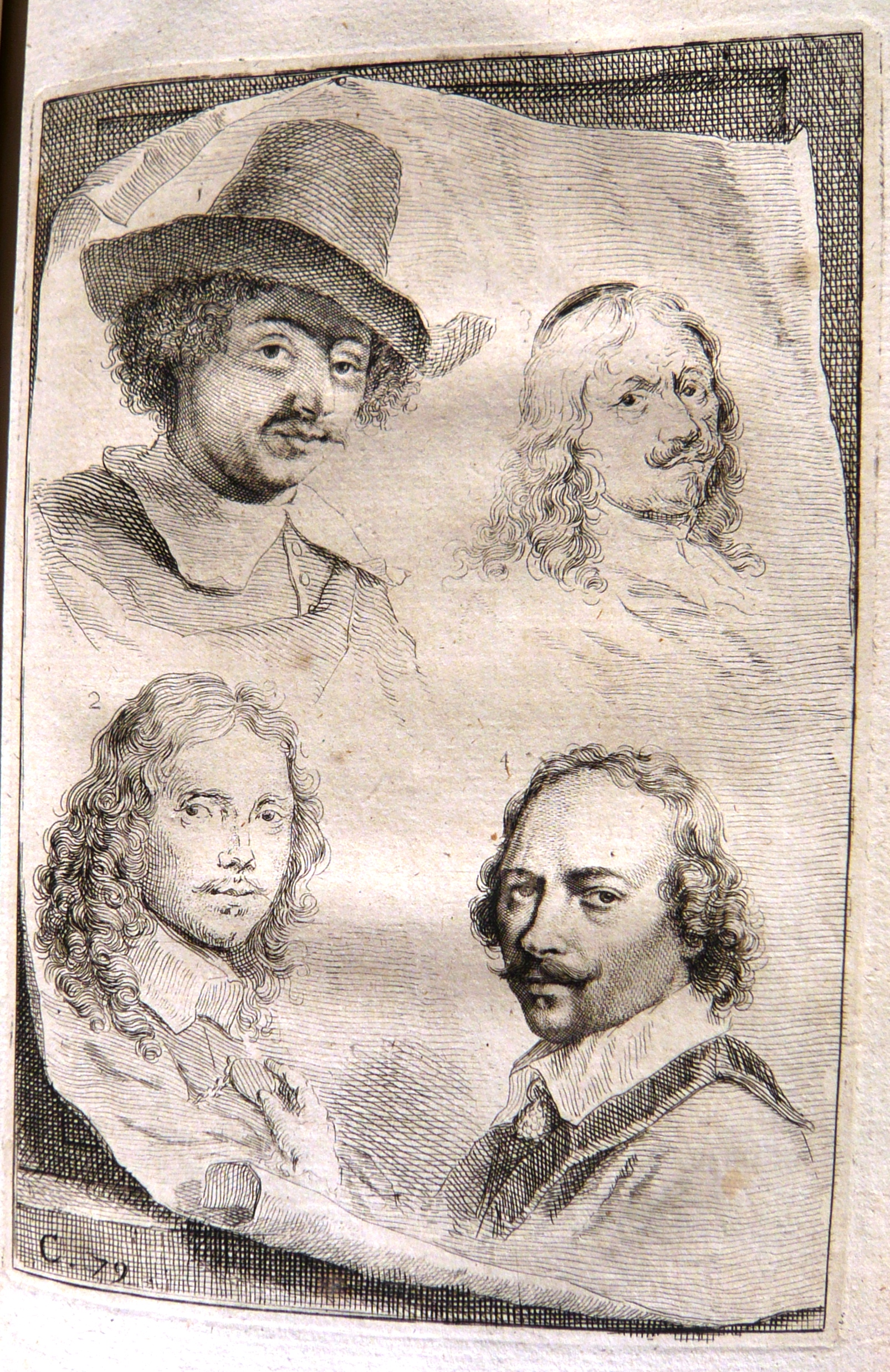
V2 plate C, p 79 Jan Bapt. Weeninx. David Beck. Sim. Pet. Tilmans. Hendr. Zorg.

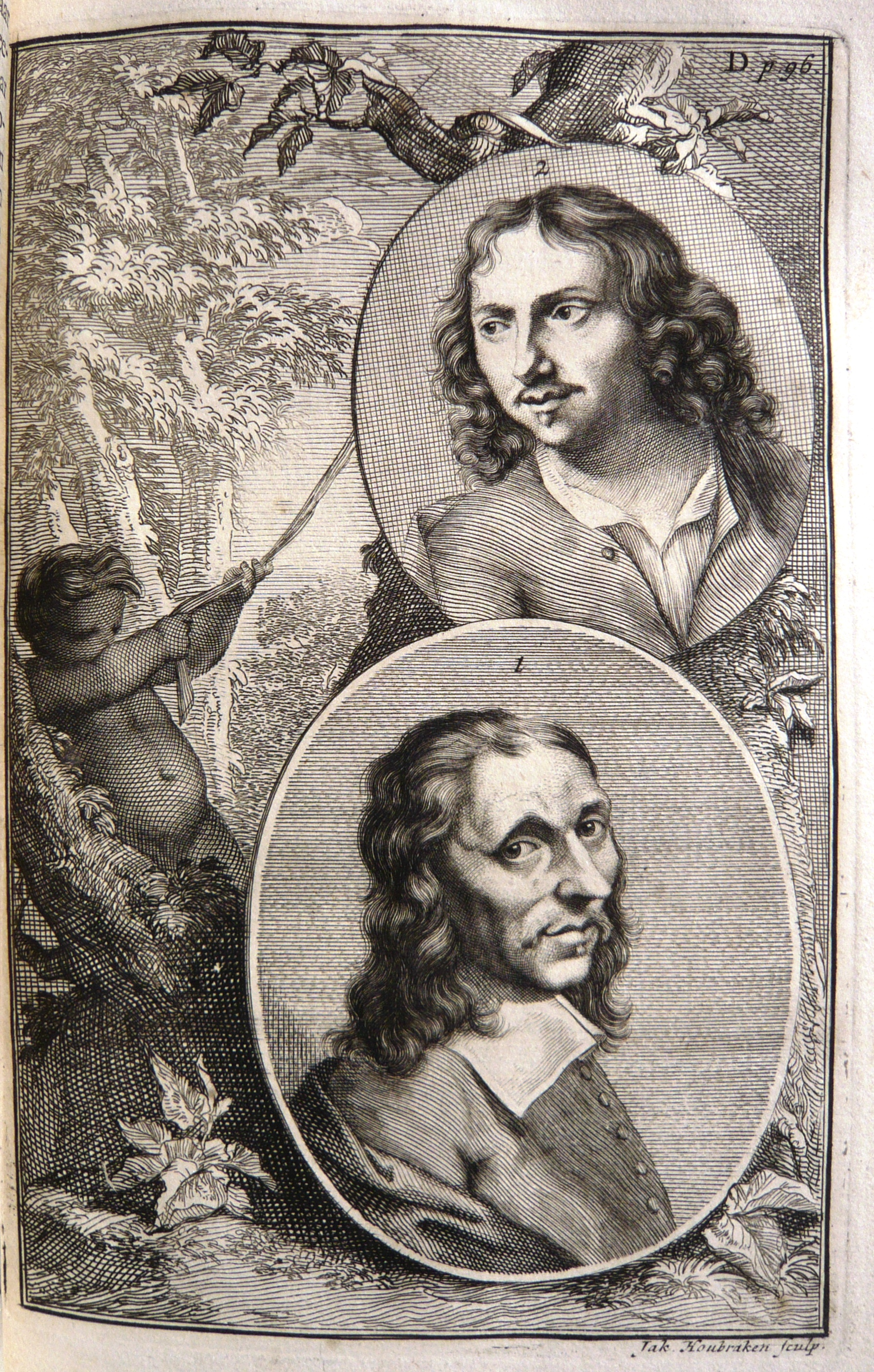
V2 plate D, p 96 Aldert van Everdingen. Adam Pynaker.

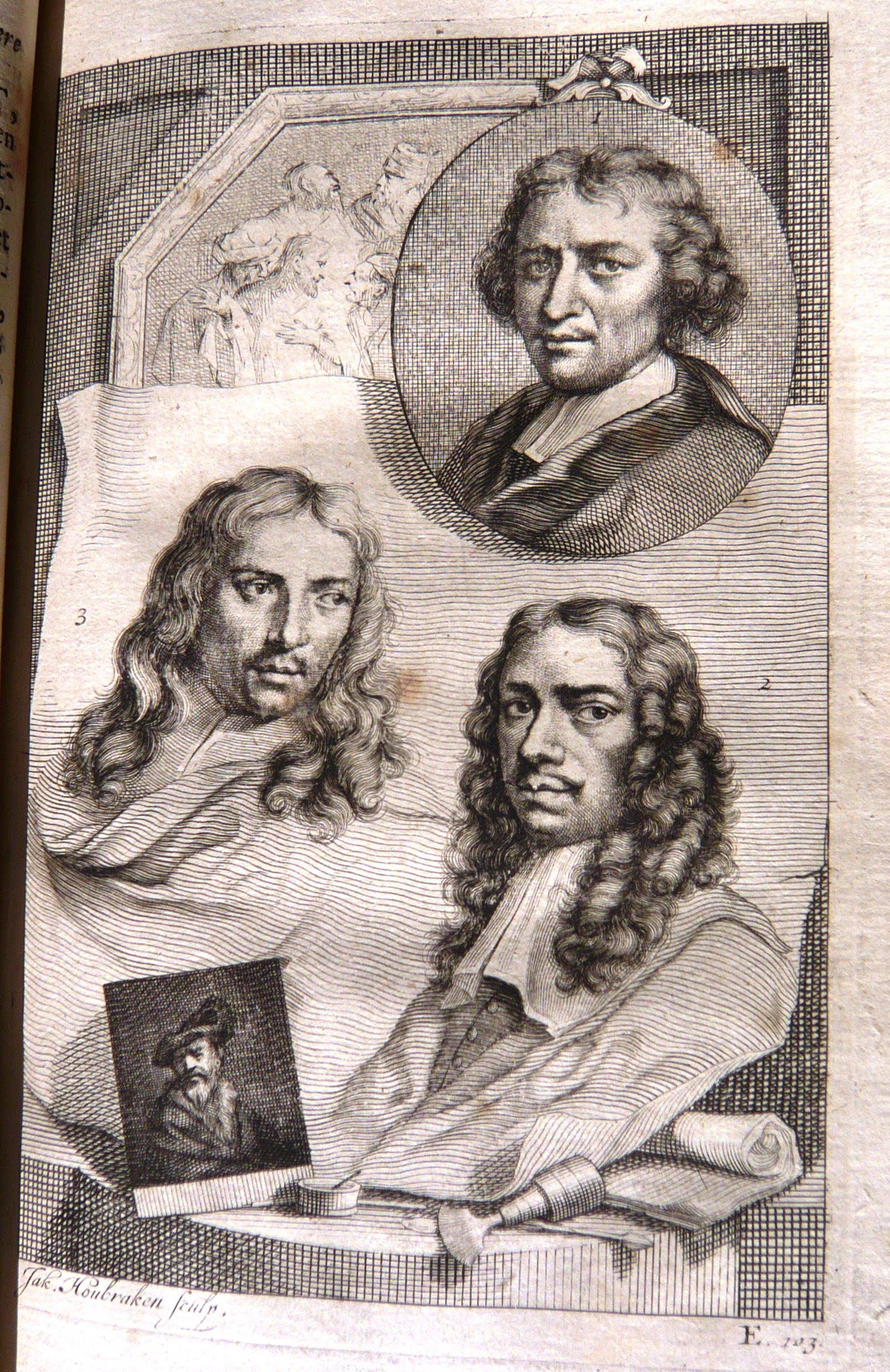
V2 plate E, p 101 Gerbr. vanden Eekhout. Wallerant Vaillant. Jaques Vaillant.

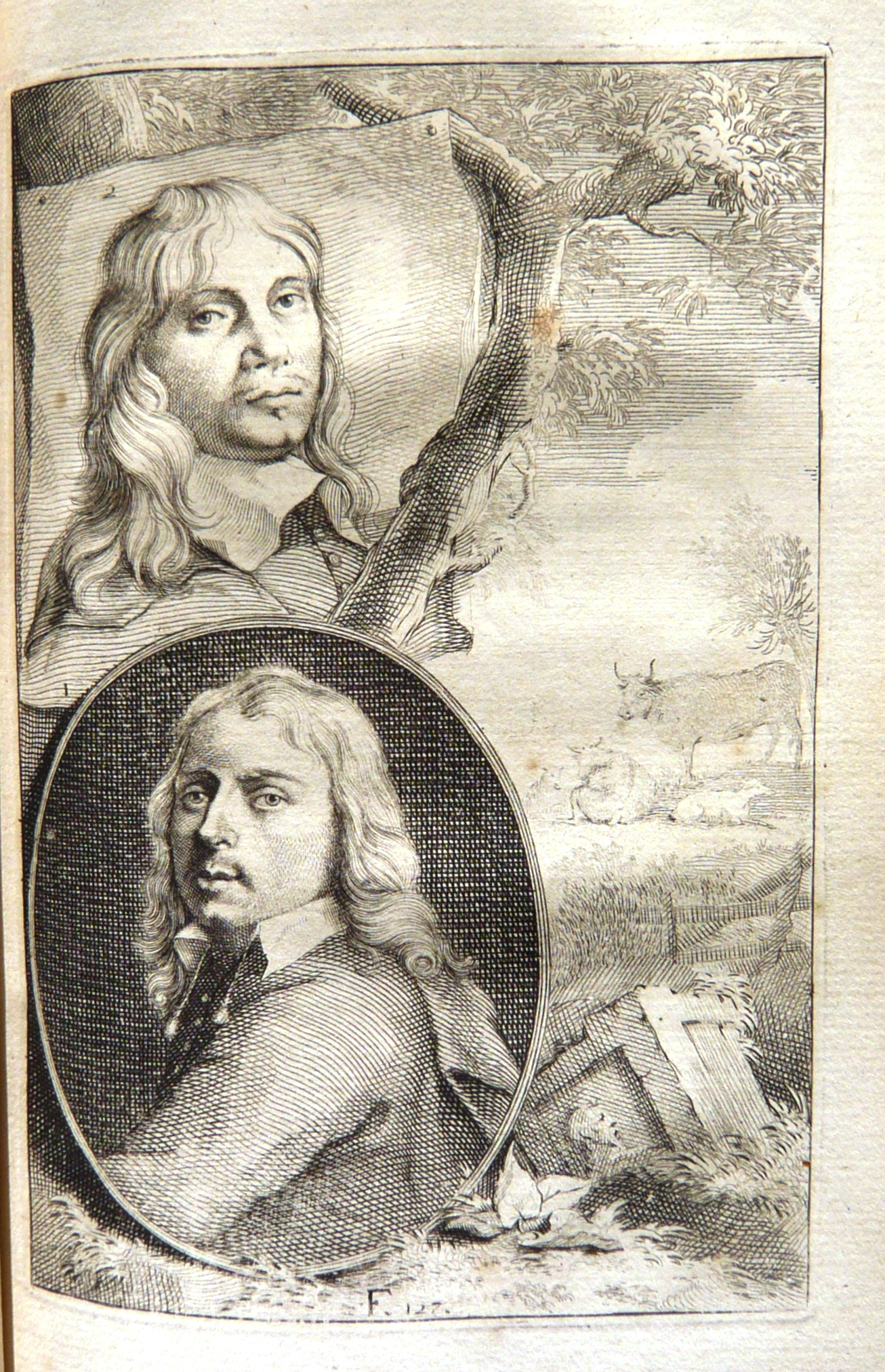
V2 plate F, p 127 Paulus Potter. Jakob vander Does.

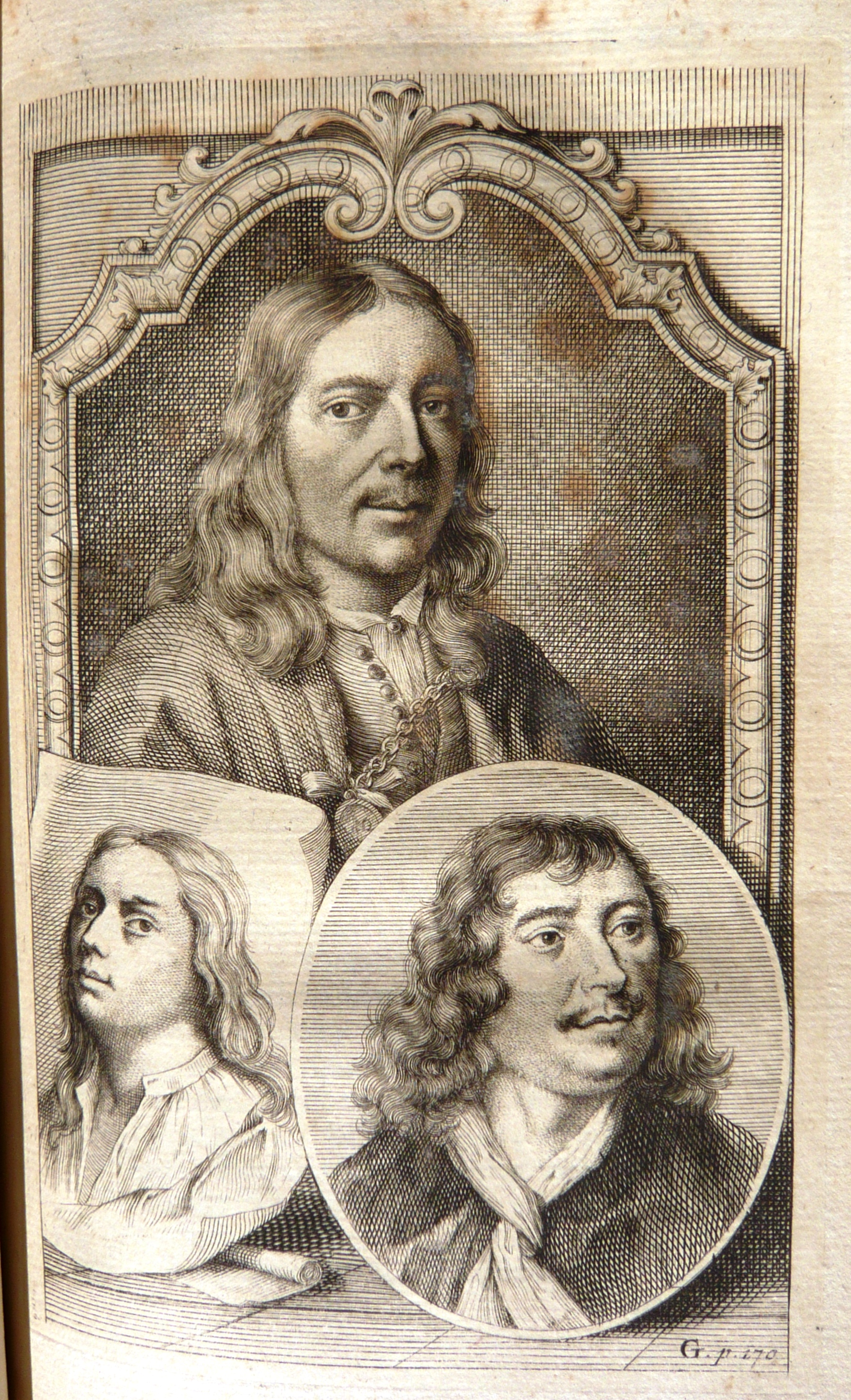
V2 plate G, p 170 Johann. Lingelbag. Samuel van Hoogstraten. Jan van Hoogstraten.

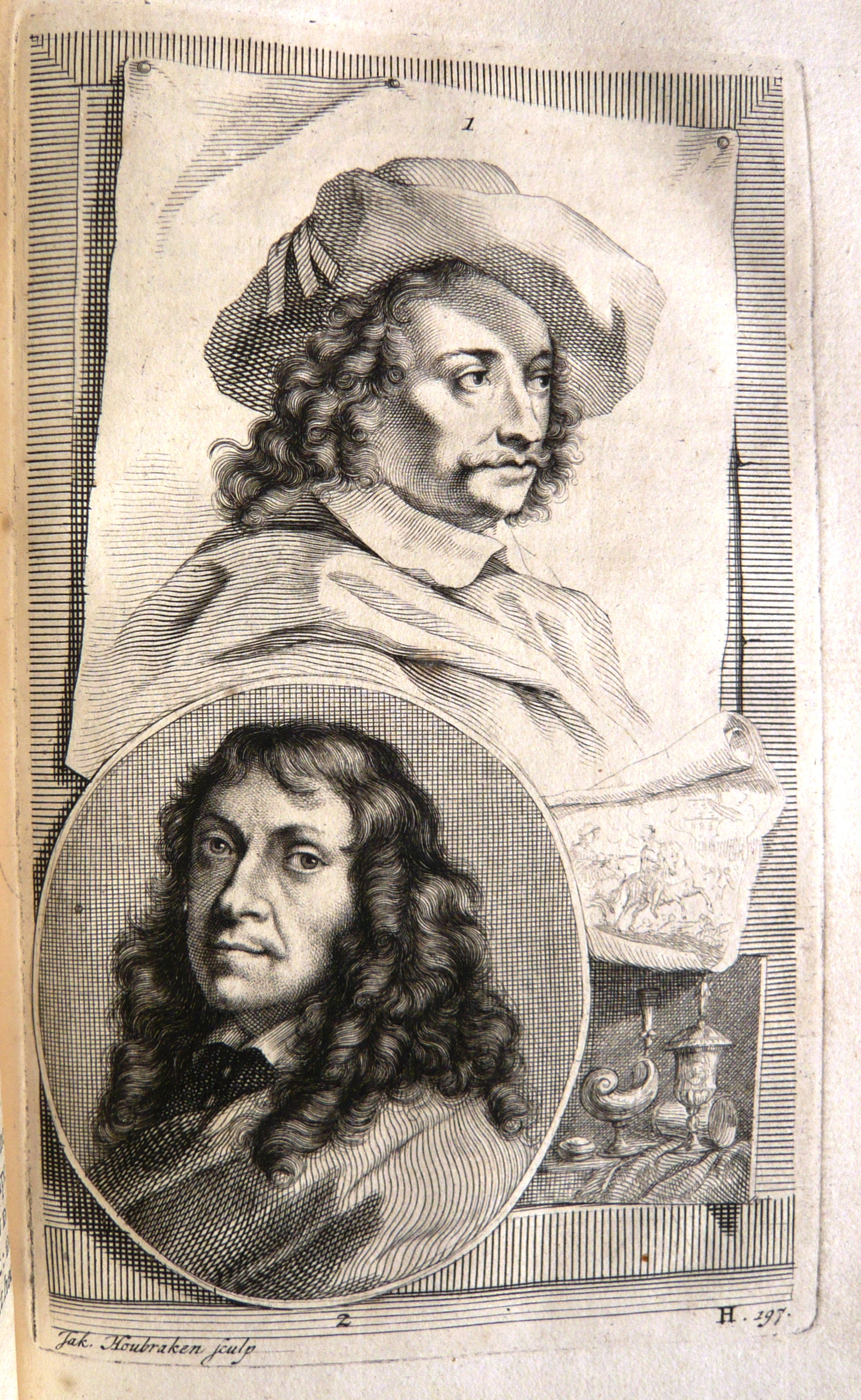
V2 plate H, p 179 Hendr. Verschuring. Willem Kalf.

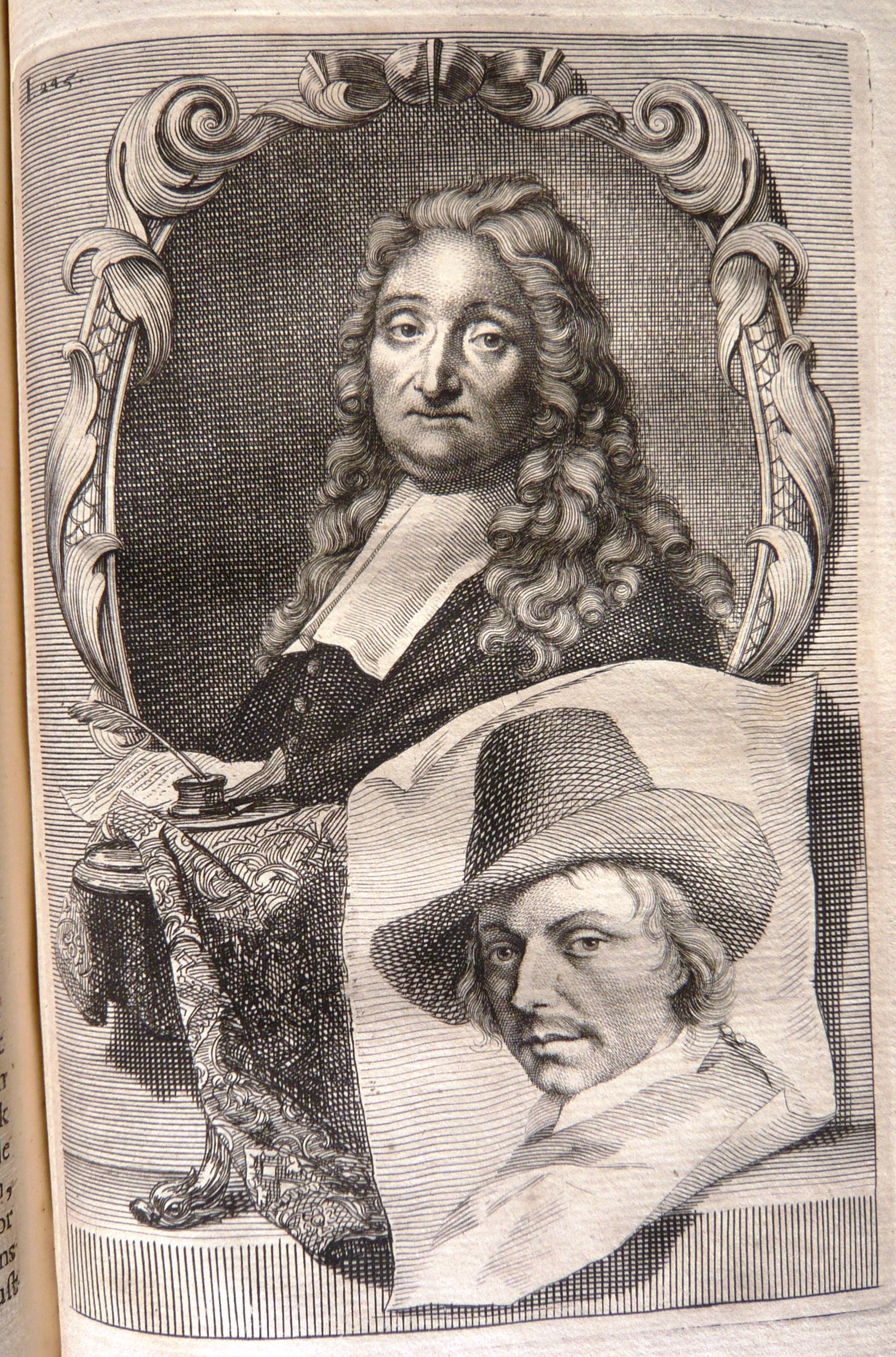
V2 plate I, p 245 Ludolf Bakhuizen. Vincent vander Vinne.

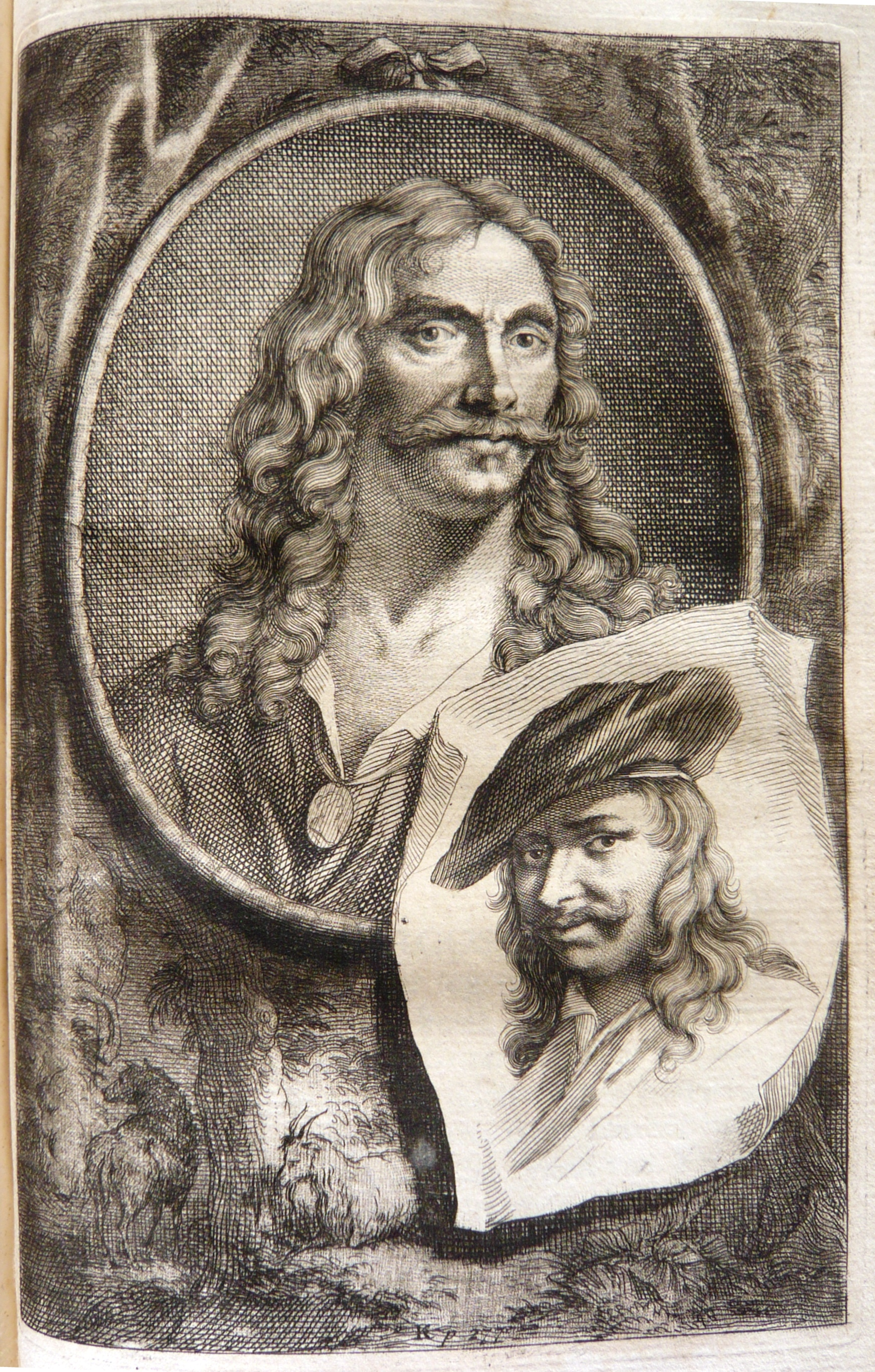
V2 plate K, p 277 Johan Hendrik Roos. Juriaan van Streek.

Media related to Schouburg II at Wikimedia Commons

- Gerrit Dou
- Nicolas van der Hek
- Marten Heemskerk van der Hek
- Bartholomeus van der Helst
- Jacques Wabbe
- Jan Albertsz Roodtseus
- Bonaventuur Peeters
- Franciscus Wouters
- David Rykaert
- Lucas Franchoys the Younger
- Frans Menton
- Mathys van den Berg
- Thomas van Wyk
- Govert Flink
- Pieter Pietersz Nedek
- Nicolas Latombe
- Hans Jordaans
- Gillis Schagen
- Ludolf de Jong
- Pieter de Hoogh
- Gonzalo Coques
- Peter Lely
- Juriaan Jacobze
- Robert van Hoeck
- Antoni Waterloo
- Jan Philip van Thielen
- Carel van Savoyen
- Philip de Koninck
- Zacharias Paulusz
- Jacob Delff
- Jan Babtist van Duinen
- Adrian Verdoel
- Jan de Groot
- Philip Wouwerman
- Jan Baptista Weeninx
- David Beck
- Joan Couper
- George Geldorp (Note: The name appears in the entry as "GELSDORF" but refers to George Geldorp. Houbraken calls him an "Engelsman" ('Englishman') who "made many pourtretts in England" and reports that Joachim von Sandrart considered Geldorp a poor draughtsman, who used guides drawn by others as the basis for some figures in his paintings: Sandrart, meld ook in dien tyd van eenen Engelsman GELSDORF genaamt, die veel pourtretten in Engeland heeft gemaakt. Dog hy kon niet teekenen, waarom hy ook genootzaakt was door iemant anders den omtrek van 't wezen op papier te laten teekenen, 't geen hy dan met een naalt doorgeprikt, op zyn paneel doorsponste. Diergelyke soort ontmoet ons nu en dan al meer. Dog wy hebben onze pen niet voor krukken en breekebeenen versneden. — "Gelsdorf", Groote Schouburgh Part II, p. 88 George, born and trained in Cologne, was the son of Flemish portraitist Gortzius Geldorp; he moved to London from Antwerp in 1623, holding positions at court.) (Gelsdorf [sic]) Schouburg II, p. 88
- Simon Peter Tilmans
- Hendrik Martensz
- Jan Duive
- Dirk Meerkerk
- Jacob Reugers Blok
- Jan Donker & Pieter Donker
- Cesar van Everdingen
- Jan van Everdingen
- Albert van Everdingen
- Adam Pynaker
- Cornelis de Man
- Gerbrant van den Eekhout
- Joris van Son
- Emanuel Murant
- Wallerant Vaillant
- Jacob van der Does
- Theodor Helmbreker
- Nicolas Berchem
- Jan Both & Andries Both
- Johan Torrentius
- Paulus Potter
- Hercules Segers
- Johannes van Kessel
- Johannes Peeters
- Peter Boel
- Joannes van Heck
- Philippus Fruytiers
- Antonius Goebouw & Franciscus de Neve
- Joannes Fyt
- Peeter Tysens
- Gerrit van Hoochstadt
- Gysbrecht Thys
- Johannes Lingelbag
- Jan Worst
- Willem van Drillenburg
- Jacob Lavecq
- Samuel van Hoogstraten
- Mathias Withoos
- Hendrik Graauw
- Pieter van Roestraten
- Hendrik Verschuring
- Willem Verschuring
- Jacob van der Ulft
- Jan Teunisz Blankhof
- Barent Graat
- Josef Oostfries
- Klaas van der Meulen
- Katharina Oostfries
- Jan Slob
- Vincent van der Vinne
- Maria van Oosterwijck
- Geertje Pieters
- Willem Kalf
- Cornelis Bisschop
- Jacobus Bisschop
- Abraham Bisschop
- Peter van Breda
- Janson van Keulen
- Gerard Pieterz van Zyl
- Michiel Willemans
- Willem Doudyns
- Ary van der Kabel
- Ludolf Bakhuizen
- Benjamin Blok
- Anna Katrina
- Kristoffel Pierson
- Bartholemeus Meyburg
- Katharina Rozee
- Willem Schellinks
- Nicolaes Maes
- Johan Hendrik Roos
- Filip Roos
- Theodor Roos
- Juriaan van Streek
- Hendrik van Streek
- Carel Emanuel Biset
- Ottomar Elger
- Gerard Uilenburg
- Jan de Baan
- Jacobus de Baan
- Willem van den Velde
- Frederik de Moucheron
- Pieter Gallis
- Gasper van den Bos
- Adam Frans van der Meulen
- Joan G. Bouwer
- Cornelis Kik
- Cornelis Brizé
- Frans Post
- Johan van Nes
- Jan van Hoeck
- Pieter Frits

=== Volume III ===
The engraved portraits included as illustrations in Volume III are below, followed by the artists listed in order of appearance in the text.

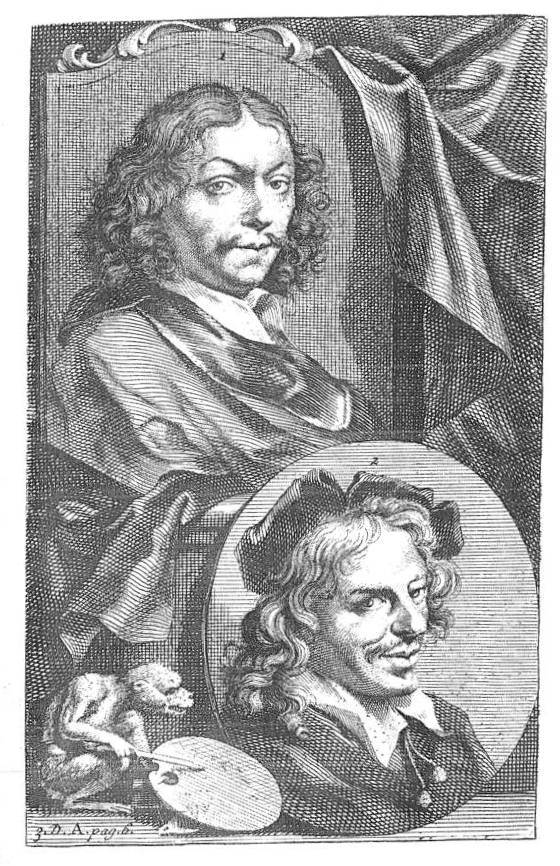
V3 plate A, p 6 Frans van Mieris. Jan Steen.

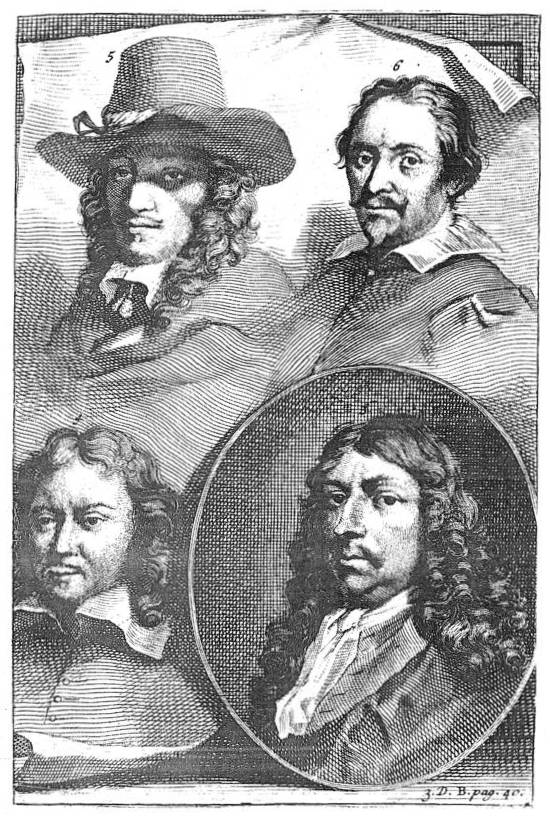
V3 plate B, p 40 Gerard ter Burg. Gabriel Mitzu. Karel de JardynGillis de Hondekoeter.

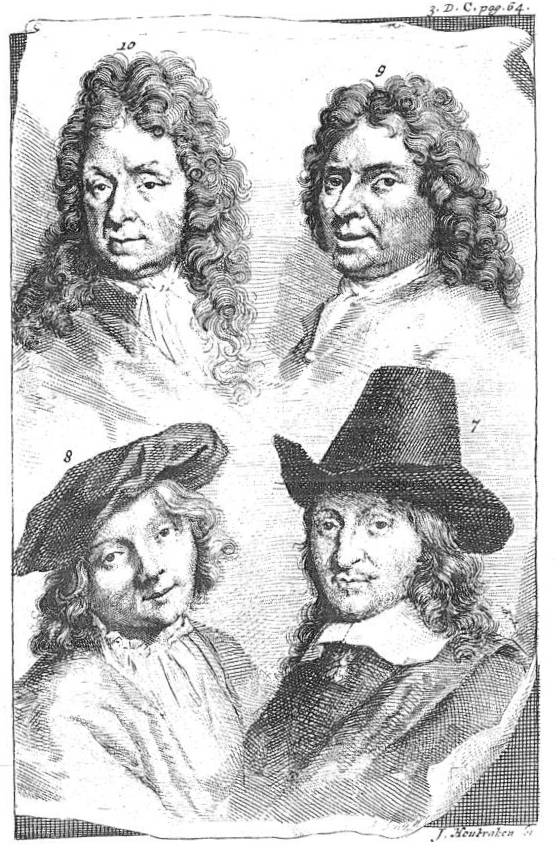
V3 plate C, p 64 Jan Asselyn. Heyman Dullaart. Jan van Pée. Melch. de Hondekoeter

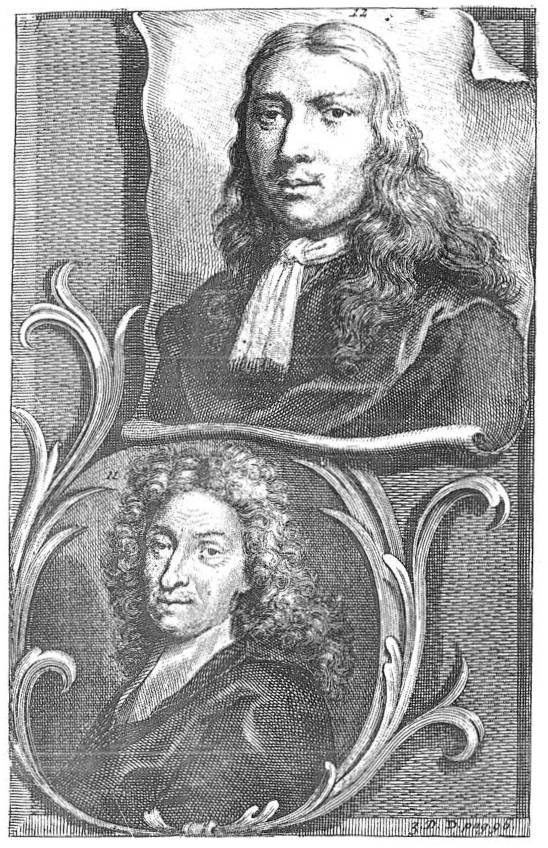
V3 plate D, p 96 Abraham Genoels. Adr. van den Velde.

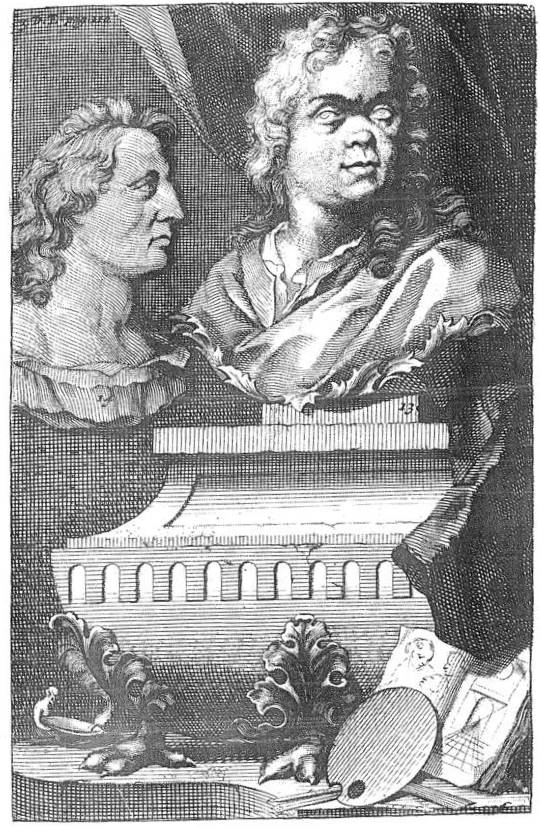
V3 plate E, p 110 Gerard de Laires. Bartolet.

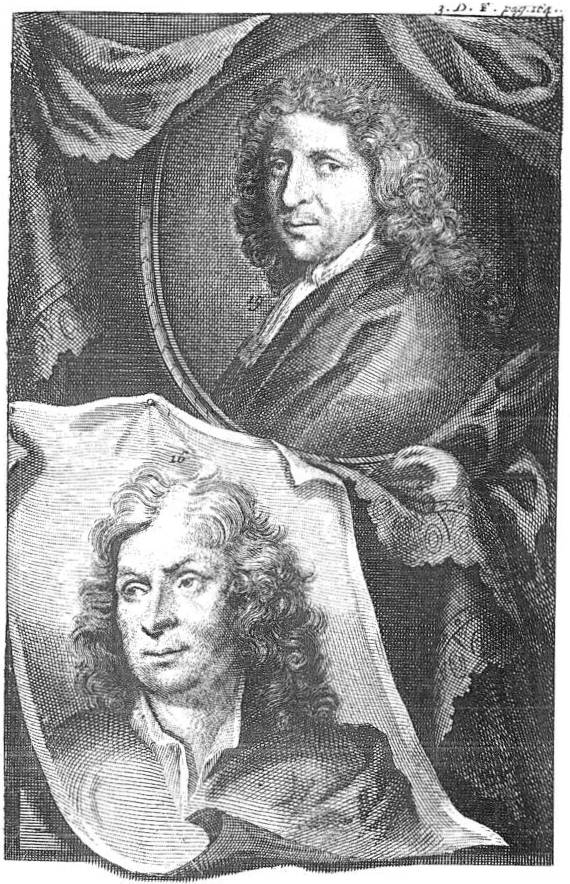
V3 plate F, p 164 Jakob Torenvliet. Mich.van Musscher.

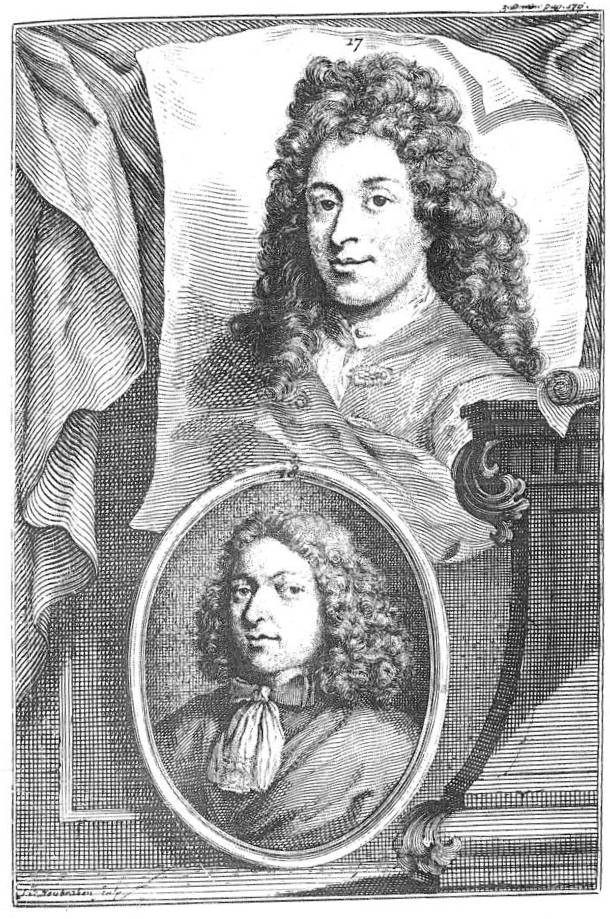
V3 plate G, p 176 Godefridus Schalken. Philip Tideman.

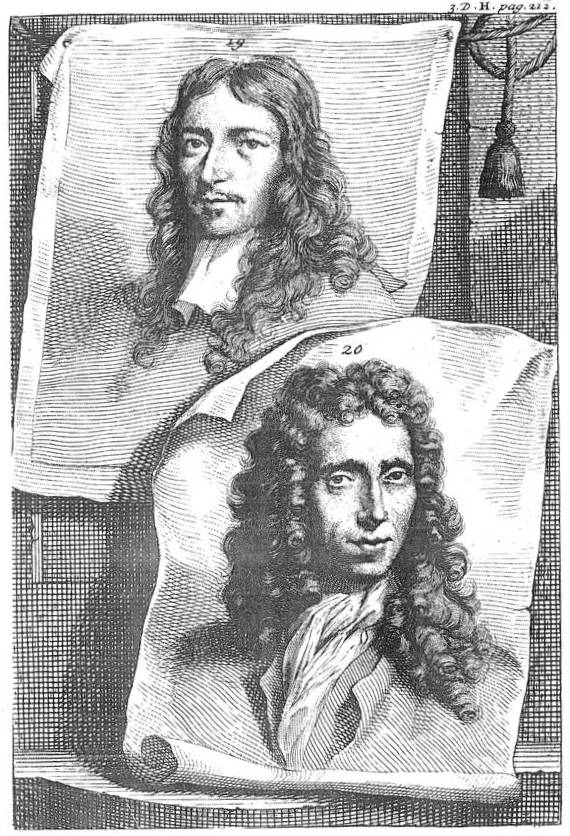
V3 plate H, p 212 Joan de Biskop. Johannes Voorhout,

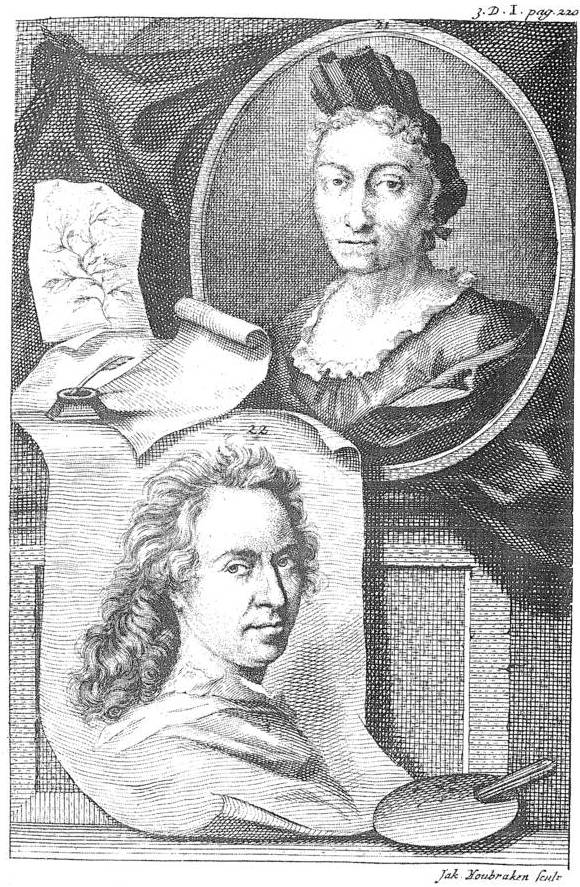
V3 plate I, p 220 Maria Sybille Merian. David vander Plaas.

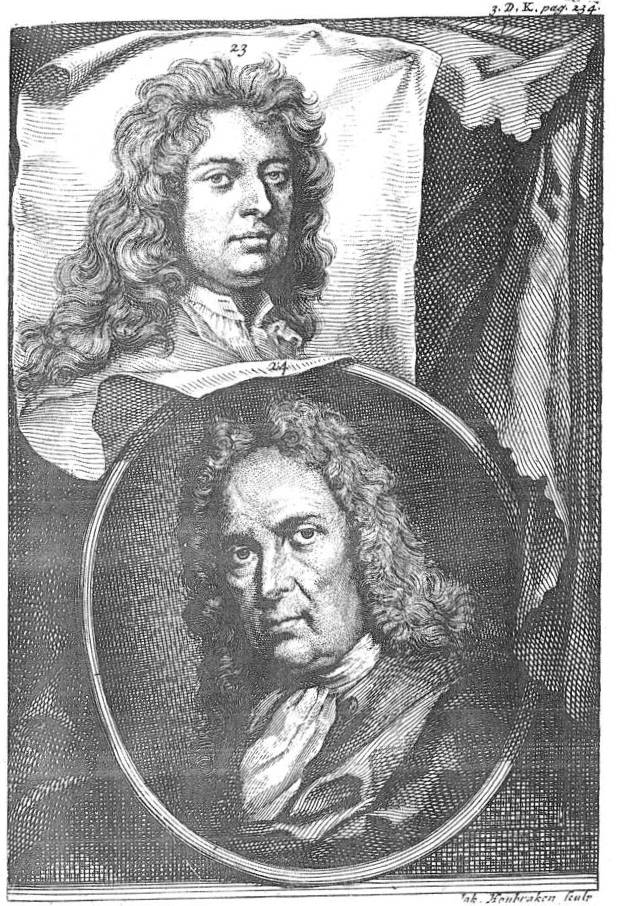
V3 plate K, p 234 Godfried Kneller. Gerard Hoet.

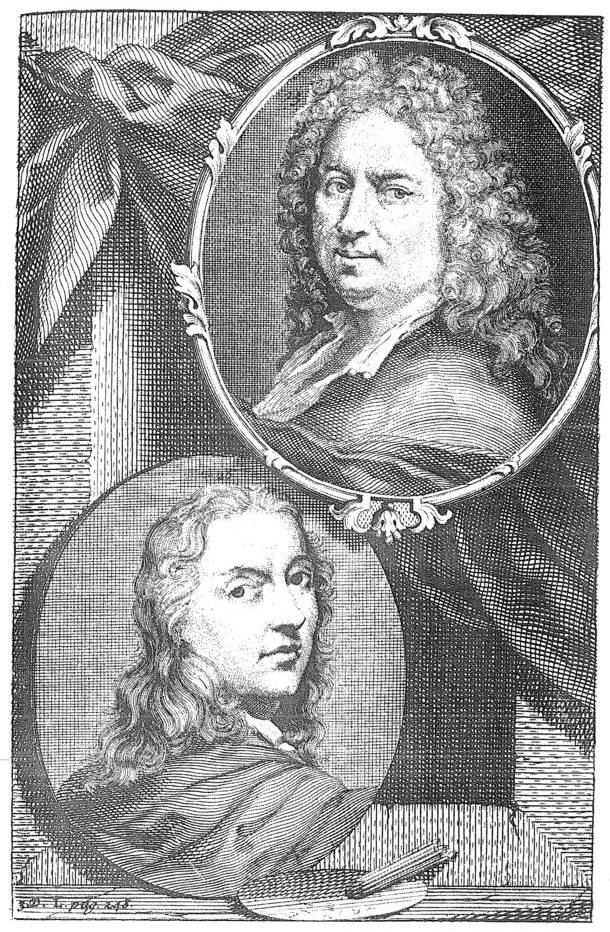
V3 plate L, p 248 Mathys Wulfraat. Augustinus ter Westen.

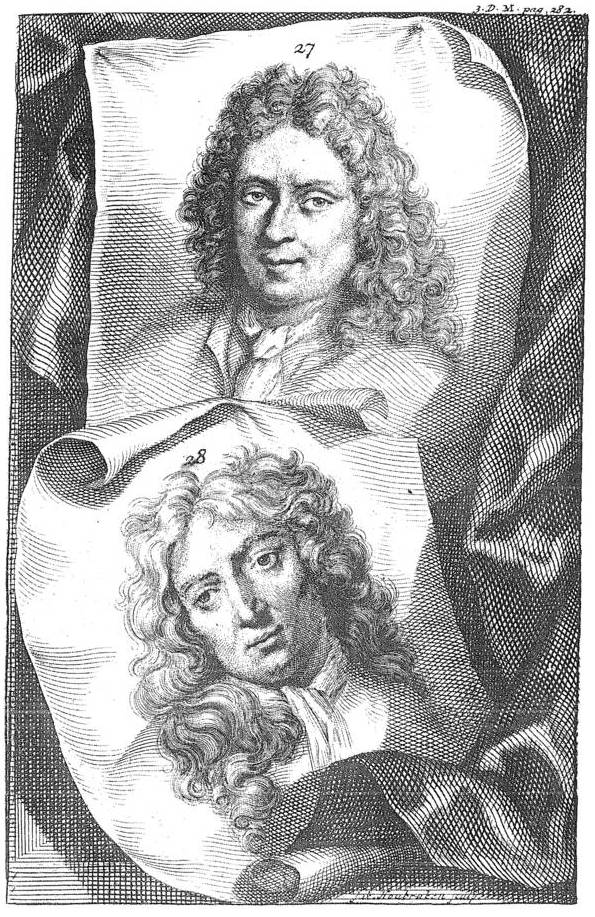
V3 plate M, p 282 Johannes Verkolje. Abraham Hondius.

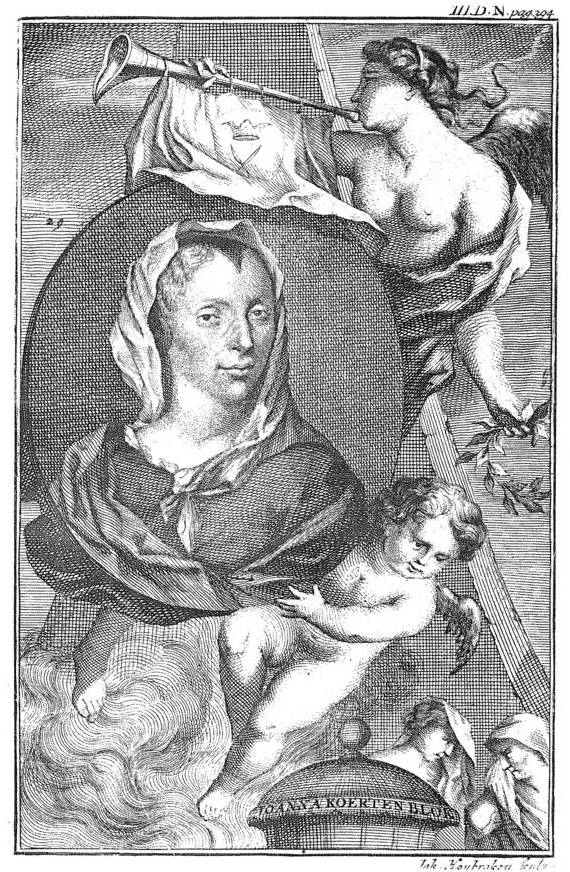
V3 plate N, p 294 Johanna Koerten.

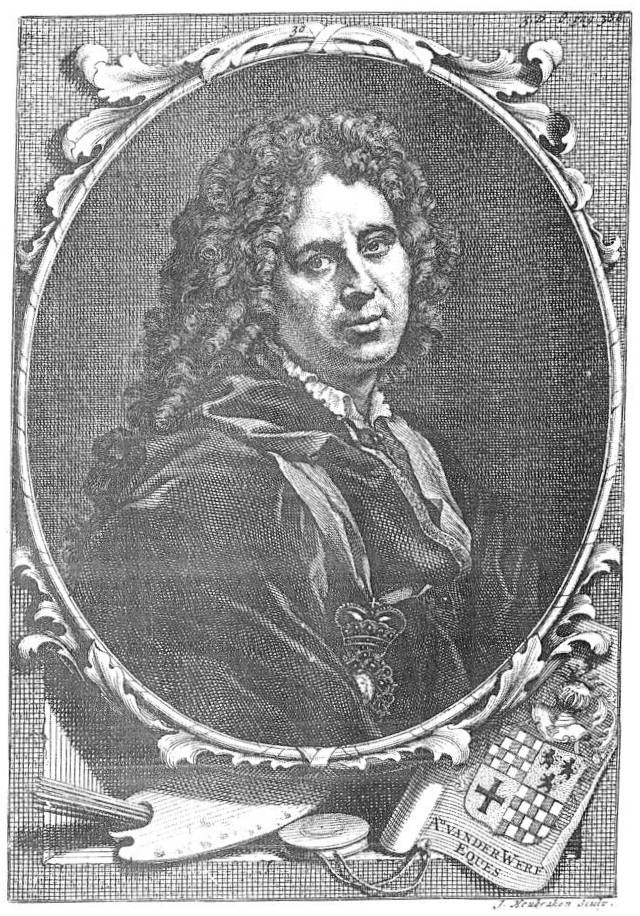
V3 plate O, p 388 Adriaan vander Werf.

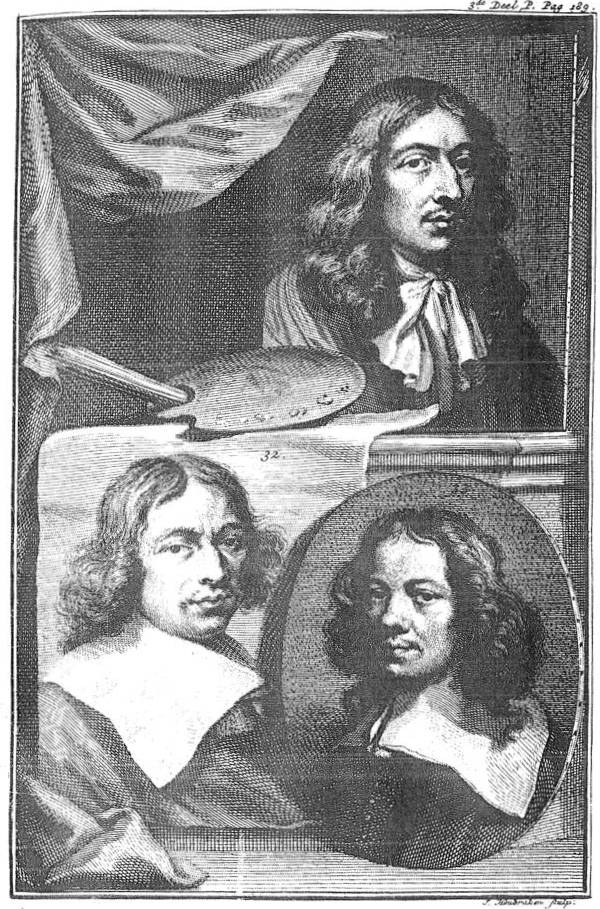
V3 plate P, p 189 Casparus Netscher. Job Berckheiden. Gerrit Berckhnden.

Media related to Schouburg III at Wikimedia Commons

- Frans van Mieris
- Jan Steen
- Jan Linsen
- Gabriel Metzu
- Johannes Spilberg
- Wilhelm Breekvelt
- Jan Hakkert
- Pieter van Anraat
- J Weyerman
- Rombout van Trojen
- Carel de Jardyn
- Willem Drost, Van Terlee, Willem de Poorter
- Jacob Gellig
- Spalthof & Broers
- Martinus Zaagmolen
- Johannes Buns
- Jan Asselyn
- Jacob van Ruisdael & Salomon van Ruisdael
- Ludowyk Smits
- Melchior de Hondekoeter
- Mathys Harings
- Johan van Neck
- Johan Visscher
- Heiman Dullaart
- Joan van der Heyden
- Abraham Minjon
- Isak Ducart
- Justus van Pee
- Cornelis Cornelisz
- Adrian van den Velde
- Dirk van Bergen
- Gasper Netscher
- Abraham Genoels
- Anna Maria, Françoise Katharina, and Maria Theresa van Thielen
- Gerard de Laires
- Barent Appelman
- Pieter van Slingelant
- Ary de Vois
- Jacob Torenvliet
- Isaac Paling
- Johannes van Haansbergen
- Eglon van der Neer
- Godfrid Schalken
- Gabriel van der Leeuw
- Abraham van Kalraat
- Jan van Aken
- Pieter Molyn
- Dirk Freres
- Adriaan Bakker
- Horatius Paulyn
- Gysbert Verhoek
- Job Berkheyde & Gerard Berkheyde
- Johannes Vorstermans
- Johan Soukens
- Joris van der Haagen
- Francisco Milet
- Arent de Gelder
- Joan Baptist de Champanje
- Albert Meyering
- Michiel van Musscher
- Joan de Biskop
- Ary Huibertsz Verveer
- Hubert van Ravestein
- Johannes Glauber
- Jan Gotlief Glauber
- Maria Sybille Merian
- Johannes Voorhout
- Mathys Neveu
- Jacob Denys
- David van der Plaas
- Daniel Syder
- Godfried Kneller & Johan Zacharias Kneller
- Jan van Kessel
- Gerard Hoet
- Johannes Bronkhorst
- Abraham Diepraam
- Josef Mulder
- Mathys Wulfraat
- Johan van Hugtenburgh
- Jacob Moelaert
- Jan Luiken
- Romein de Hooge
- Jan van Nikkelen
- Augustinus Terwesten
- Johannes Verkolje
- Ugaart Delvenaar & Jacob Koning
- Johannes van der Bent
- Pieter Reuven
- Matheus Wytman
- Marienhof
- Johan van der Meer
- Barent van Kalraat
- Johanna Koerten
- Rochus van Veen
- Dirk van Delen
- Abraham de Heusch
- Cornelis van der Meulen
- Johan Starrenberg
- Jacob de Wolf
- Guilhelmo van Ingen
- Nicolas de Vree
- Abraham Hondius
- Francoys Dancx
- Jan van Alen
- Abraham Stork
- David Colyns
- Barent Gaal
- Isaac Koene
- Pieter van der Hulst
- Pieter Peuteman
- Jan Klaasz Rietschoof
- Hendrik Rietschoof
- Cornelis Holstein
- Simon van der Does
- Theodorus & Christoffel Lubienietzky
- Jan Hoogzaat
- Carel Fabritius
- Johan van Bunnik
- Carel de Moor
- Jan Frans van Douven
- Simon Germyn
- Willem Beurs
- John Closterman
- Jan Griffier
- Cornelis Huysmans
- Willem Wissing
- Guiliam de Heus
- Jacob de Heus
- Philip Tideman
- Ernst Stuven
- Elias van den Broek
- Laurens van der Vinne
- Paulus van Hillegaart & Pieter de Ruelles
- Jacob van Campen
- Hendrik Carree
- Bernart Schendel
- Antony Vreem
- Dirk Dalens
- Michiel Maddersteg
- Justus van Huisum
- Adrian van der Werf
