= List of pupils of Rembrandt =

The Amsterdam studio of the prolific Dutch Golden Age painter Rembrandt included numerous younger pupils/assistants. Among his many pupils were:

- Beijeren, Leendert van (1619-1649)(RKD)
- Bol, Ferdinand (1616-1680), (AH)(RKD)
- Borssom, Anthonie van (1631-1677)(RKD)
- Brouwer, Cornelis (d. 1681), (AH)(RKD)
- Dijck, Abraham van (1635-1680)(RKD)
- Doomer, Lambert (1624-1700)(RKD)
- Dorsten, Jacob van (1627-1674)(RKD)
- Dou, Gerard (1613-1675), (AH)(RKD)
- Drost, Willem (1633-1659), (AH)(RKD)
- Dullaert, Heyman (1636-1684), (AH)(RKD)
- Eeckhout, Gerbrand van den (1621-1674), (AH)(RKD)
- Fabritius, Carel (1622-1654), (AH)(RKD)
- Flinck, Govert (1615-1660), (AH)(RKD)
- Furnerius, Abraham (1628-1654)(RKD)
- Gelder, Aert de (1645-1727), (AH)(RKD)
- Gherwen, Reynier van (1620-1662)(RKD)
- Glabbeeck, Jan van (1630-1687)(RKD)
- Heerschop, Hendrick (1626 - 1690)
- Hoogstraten, Samuel van (1627-1678), (AH)(RKD)
- Horst, Gerrit Willemsz. (1612-1652), (RKD)
- Jansen, Heinrich (1625-1667)(RKD)
- Jouderville, Isaac de (1612-1646)(RKD)
- Keil, Bernhard (1624-1687), (AH)(RKD)
- Kneller, Gottfried (Sir) (1646-1723), (AH)(RKD)
- Koninck, Philips (1619-1688), (AH)(RKD)
- Leveck, Jacobus (1634-1675), (AH)(RKD)
- Maes, Nicolaes (1634-1693), (AH)(RKD)
- Mayr, Johann Ulrich (1629-1704)(RKD)
- Ovens, Jürgen (1623-1678), (AH)(RKD)
- Paudiss, Christoph (1630-1666), (AH)(RKD)
- Pluym, Karel van der (1625-1672)(RKD)
- Poorter, Willem de (1608-1649), (AH)(RKD)
- Raven, Johannes (II) (1633-1662)(RKD)
- Renesse, Constantijn à (1626-1680)(RKD)
- Rijn, Titus Rembrandtsz. van (1641-1668), (AH)(RKD)
- Rousseaux, Jacques des (1600-1638)(RKD)
- Verdoel, Adriaen (I) (1620-1675), (AH)(RKD)
- Victors, Jan (1619-1676)(RKD)
- Vliet, Jan Gillisz. van (1605-1668)(RKD)
- Wulfhagen, Franz (1624-1670), (AH)(RKD)

== See also ==
- List of Rembrandt connoisseurs and scholars
