= Van Hoogstraten =

Van Hoogstraten is a Dutch toponymic surname, meaning "from Hoogstraten" and may refer to:

- Jacob van Hoogstraten (c. 1460–1527), Flemish Dominican theologian and controversialist
- Dirk van Hoogstraten (1596–1640), Dutch painter
  - Samuel Dirksz van Hoogstraten (1627–1678), Dutch painter, poet, and author on art theory
  - Jan van Hoogstraten (1628–1654), Dutch painter
  - For other descendants of Dirk van Hoogstraten, see Van Hoogstraten (family)
- Willem van Hoogstraten (1884–1965), Dutch violinist and conductor
- Jacob Emil van Hoogstraten (1898–1991), Dutch senior public servant in colonial Indonesia
- Nicholas van Hoogstraten (born 1945), controversial British businessman
