= Hoogstraten (surname) =

Hoogstraten is a municipality located in the Belgian province of Antwerp.

It is the surname of the following people:

- Dirk van Hoogstraten (1596–1640), a Dutch Golden Age painter.
- Dorothy Ruth Hoogstraten (1960–1980), a Canadian model and actress.
- Jacob van Hoogstraaten (c. 1460–1527), a theologian and controversialist.
- Ludwig von Salm-Hoogstraeten (1885–1944), an Austrian tennis player.
- Nicholas van Hoogstraten (born 1945), a British businessman.
- Samuel Dirksz van Hoogstraten (1627–1678), a Dutch painter of the Golden Age, and biographer of artists, son of Dirk van Hoogstraten.
- Willem van Hoogstraten (1884–1964), a Dutch violinist and conductor.
