= Jacob and Esau =

Story in the Book of Genesis

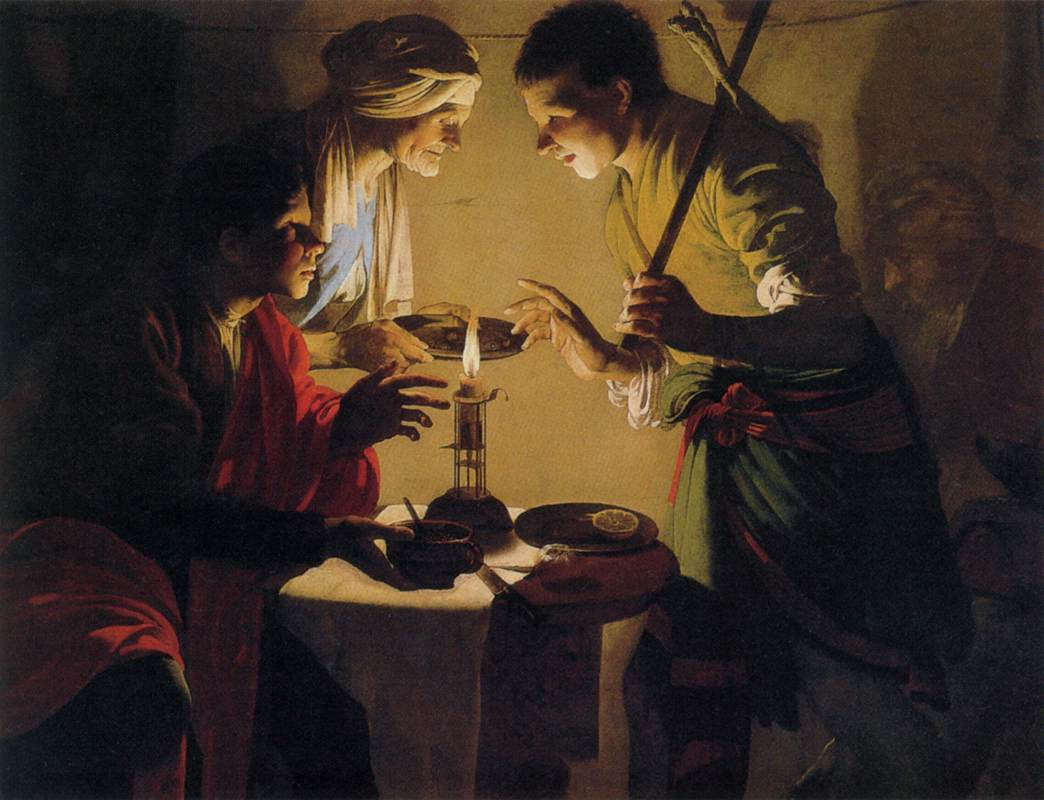
Hendrick ter Brugghen, Esau Selling His Birthright, c. 1627.

The biblical Book of Genesis speaks of a relationship between fraternal twins Jacob and Esau, sons of Isaac and Rebekah. The story focuses on Esau's loss of his birthright to Jacob and the conflict that ensued between their descendant nations because of Jacob's deception of their aged and blind father, Isaac, in order to receive Esau's birthright/blessing from Isaac.

This conflict was paralleled by the affection the parents had for their favored child: "Isaac, who had a taste for wild game, loved Esau, but Rebekah loved Jacob." Even since their conception, conflict between them was foreshadowed: "And the children struggled together within her; and she said, If it be so, why am I thus? And she went to inquire of the Lord. And the Lord said unto her, Two nations are in thy womb, and two manner of people shall be separated from thy bowels; and the one people shall be stronger than the other people; and the elder shall serve the younger."

== Biblical narrative ==
Genesis 25:26 states that Esau was born before Jacob, who came out holding on to his older brother's heel as if he was trying to pull Esau back into the womb so that he could be firstborn. The name Jacob means "he grasps the heel", which is a Hebrew idiom referring to deceptive behavior.

=== Birthright ===
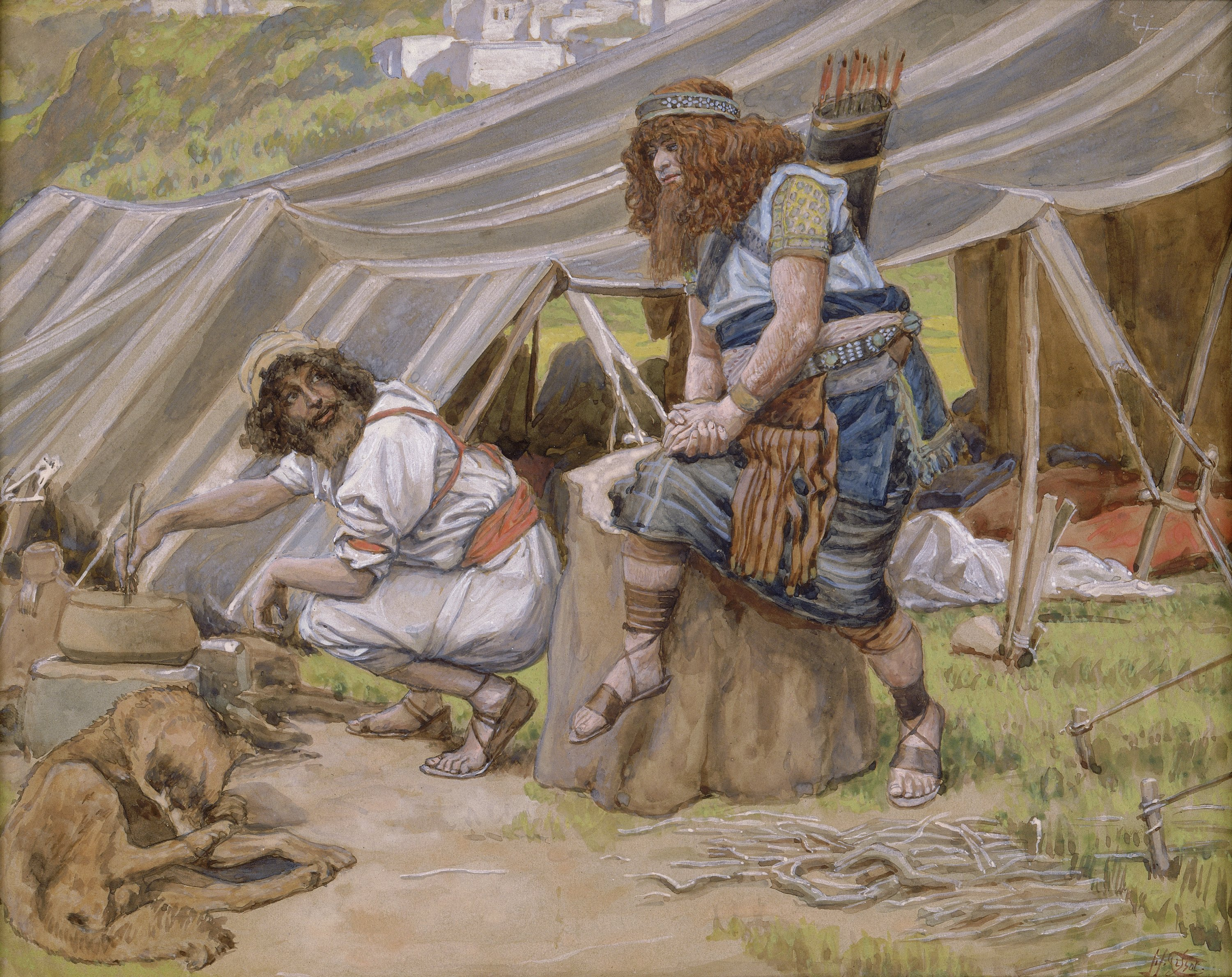
The Mess of Pottage (watercolor circa 1896–1902 by James Tissot)

In Genesis 25, Esau returned to his brother, Jacob, being famished from the fields. He begged his twin brother to give him some "red pottage" (paralleling his nickname, Hebrew: אדום, adom, meaning "red"). Jacob offered to give Esau a bowl of stew in exchange for his birthright (the right to be recognized as firstborn) and Esau agreed.

The birthright (bekorah) has to do with both position and inheritance. By birthright, the firstborn son inherited the leadership of the family and the judicial authority of his father. Deuteronomy 21:17 states that he was also entitled to a double portion of the paternal inheritance.

In the interpretation of political scientist Daniel J. Elazar, Esau acts impulsively: "Esau demonstrates that he does not deserve to be the one who continues Abraham's responsibilities and rewards under God's covenant, since he does not have the steady, thoughtful qualities which are required... Jacob shows his willingness as well as his greater intelligence and forethought... What he does is not quite honorable, though not illegal. The title that he gains is at least partially valid, although he is insecure enough about it to conspire later with his mother to deceive his father so as to gain the blessing for the first-born as well."

Later, Esau marries two wives, both Hittite women, that is, locals, in violation of Abraham's (and God's) injunction to not take wives from among the Canaanite population. Again, one gets the sense of a headstrong person who acts impulsively, without sufficient thought. His marriages are described as a vexation to both Rebekah and Isaac. Even his father, who has strong affection for him, is hurt by his act. According to Daniel J. Elazar this action alone forever rules out Esau as the bearer of patriarchal continuity. Esau could have overcome the sale of his birthright; Isaac was still prepared to give him the blessing due the firstborn. But acquiring foreign wives meant the detachment of his children from the Abrahamic line. Despite the deception on the part of Jacob and his mother to gain Isaac's blessing, Jacob's vocation as Isaac's legitimate heir in the continued founding of the Jewish people is reaffirmed.

Elazar suggests the Bible indicates that a bright, calculating person, even if he is less than honest at times, is preferable as a founder over a bluff, impulsive one who cannot make discriminating choices.

=== Blessing of the firstborn ===
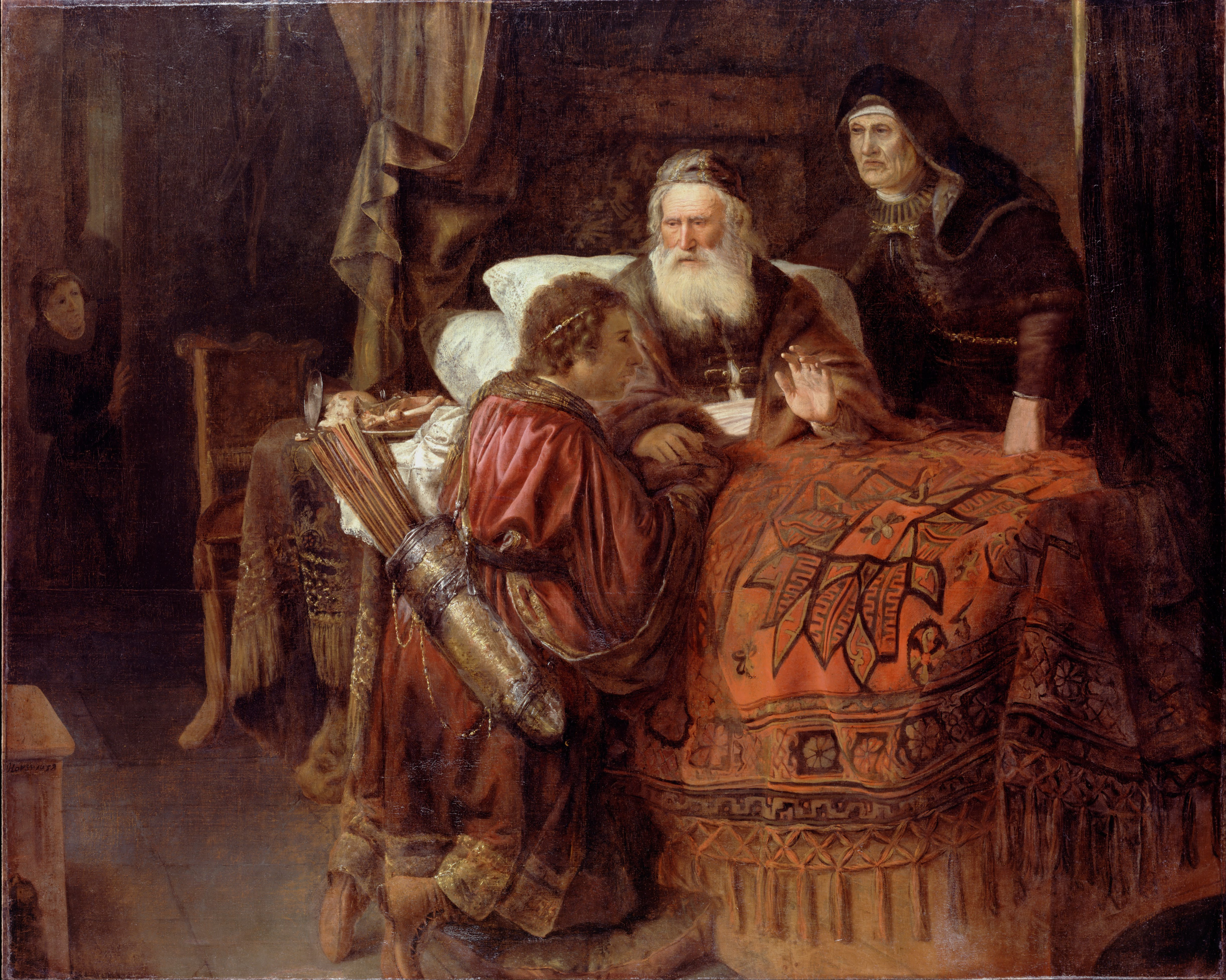
Horst, Gerrit Willemsz. - Isaac blessing Jacob

In Genesis 27:5–7, Rebekah overhears Isaac tell Esau, "Bring me venison and prepare a savoury food, that I may eat, and bless thee before the LORD before my death." Rebekah counsels Jacob to pretend to be Esau, in order to obtain the blessing in his brother's stead. He dressed himself in Esau's best clothes and disguised himself by covering his arms in lamb skin so that if his blind father touched him, he would think Jacob his more hirsute brother. Jacob brought Isaac a dish of goat meat prepared by Rebekah to taste like venison. Isaac then bestowed the blessing (bekhorah), which confers a prophetic wish for fertility (vv. 27–28) and dominion (v.29), on Jacob before Esau's return.

Esau is furious and vows to kill Jacob as soon as their father has died. Rebekah intervenes to save her younger son Jacob from being murdered by her elder son, Esau. At Rebekah's urging, Jacob flees to a distant land to work for his mother's brother, Laban. She explains to Isaac that she has sent Jacob to find a wife among her own people.

Jacob does not immediately receive his father's inheritance. Jacob, having fled for his life, leaves behind the wealth of Isaac's flocks and land and tents in Esau's hands. Jacob is forced to sleep out on the open ground and then work for wages as a servant in Laban's household. Jacob, who had deceived his father, is in turn deceived and cheated by his uncle Laban concerning Jacob's seven years of service (lacking money for a dowry) for the hand of Laban's daughter Rachel, receiving his older daughter Leah instead. However, despite Laban, Jacob eventually becomes so rich as to incite the envy of Laban and Laban's sons.

=== Reconciliation ===
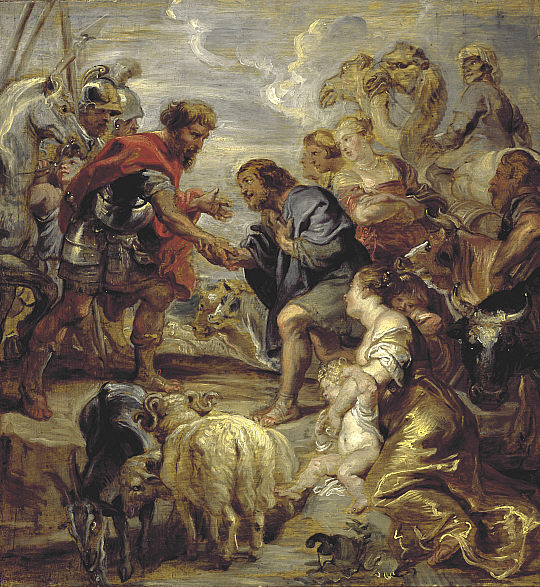
Peter Paul Rubens, The Reconciliation of Jacob and Esau, 1624.

Genesis 32-33 tells of Jacob and Esau's eventual meeting, (Note: Genesis 32:1 in Hebrew Bibles is Genesis 31:55 in most English Bibles. Verse numbers in Genesis 32 differ accordingly. This section uses Hebrew Bible numbering.) Jacob having left Laban in accordance with God's commandment in Genesis 31:3, "Return to the land of your fathers and to your kindred, and I will be with you", after he had spent more than 20 years staying with Laban in Paddan-Aram. Jacob realises that he will meet Esau on his return and sends messages of peace, but hears by return that Esau has 400 men to support him when they meet.

The two men prepare for their meeting like warriors about to enter into battle. Jacob divides his family into two camps so that if one half is taken the other might escape. Jacob sends messengers to Esau, as well as gifts sent in several installments, to appease his brother, recalling that he is returning to Canaan because this was God's command.

Jacob is given the name Israel after he wrestles with the Angel of God as he is traveling to Esau. His hip is knocked out of joint but he keeps on wrestling and so gains the name "Israel". (Note: In Biblical Hebrew the name "Israel" means one who wrestles with God. See also Jacob's Ladder.)

After the encounter with the angel, Jacob crosses over the ford Jabbok and encounters Esau; he seems initially pleased to see him, and Esau greets each section of Jacob's family as they bow to honour him. Jacob tries to offer Esau a further gift from his own hand. Esau refuses the gift at first but Jacob humbles himself before his brother and presses him to take it, which he finally does. Esau then offers to lead the way back to Mount Seir. (Note: The words in Hebrew, וְאֵלְכָה לְנֶגְדֶּךָ, can mean either "I will go in front" or "I will proceed at your pace".) However, Jacob evidently does not trust his brother's favour to continue for long, so he makes excuses to avoid traveling to Mount Seir behind Esau. He further evades Esau's attempt to put his own men among Jacob's bands, and finally completes the deception of his brother yet again by going to Succoth and then to Shalem, a city of Shechem, instead of following Esau at a distance to Seir.

The next time Jacob and Esau meet is at the burial of their father, Isaac, in Hebron.

== Interpretation ==
=== Views of the birthright ===
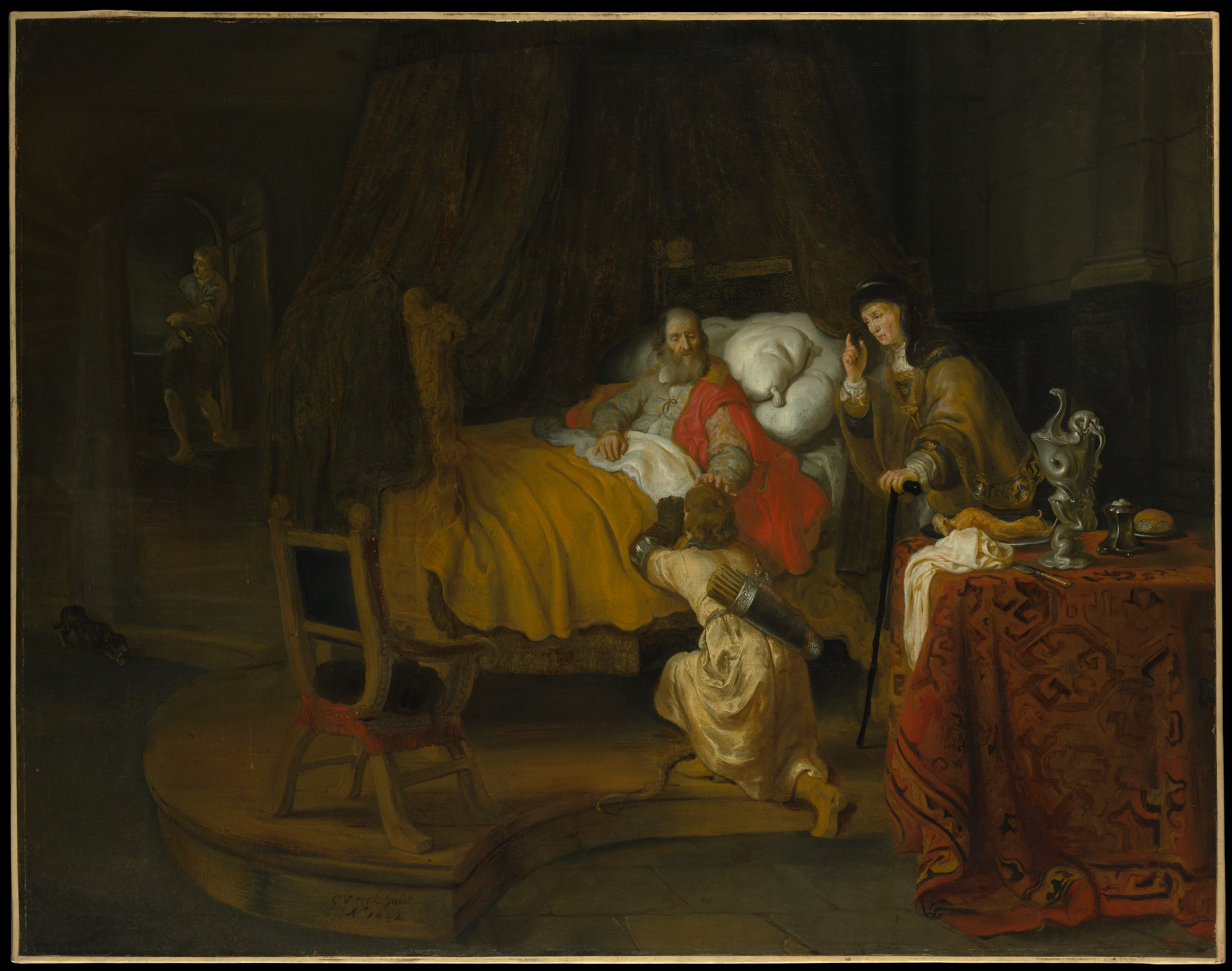
"When [Isaac] told Jacob, “Come closer that I may feel you, my son,” (Gen 27 21) Jacob urinated onto his calves, and his heart became as soft as wax, and God assigned to him two angels, one on his right and one on his left, in order to hold him up by his elbows." Genesis Rabbah 65:19

The narrative of Esau selling his birthright to Jacob, in Genesis 25, states that Esau despised his birthright. However, it also alludes to Jacob being deceitful.

In Esau's mother and father's eyes, the deception may have been deserved. Rebekah later abets Jacob in receiving his father's blessing disguised as Esau. Isaac then refuses to take Jacob's blessing back after learning he was tricked, and does not give this blessing to Esau but, after Esau begs, gives him an inferior blessing.

Justus Knecht comments that: "The Wisdom of God, which makes good come out of evil, can be learnt from this story. Almighty God had from the beginning, or rather from all eternity, chosen Jacob to be the heir of His promises. The faults of men (such as Isaac's preference for Esau, Jacob's deceit, and Esau's hatred) could not alter what He had ordained; on the contrary, they served, under the divine guidance, for the accomplishment of it. Jacob, especially, was strengthened in confidence in God, and purified by the very consequences of his deceit, his long exile and servitude. He was by them confirmed in humility and piety, and trained to be a holy man of God, and the worthy heir of the promises."

=== Isaac's blessing ===
Pronouncing the blessing was considered to be the act formally acknowledging the firstborn as the principal heir.

=== Jacob's gifts for Esau ===
After dispatching a series of placatory gifts for Esau before they meet, Jacob's final gift, offered from his own hand in Genesis 33:10, is interpreted by Adam Clarke in terms of oriental custom:

Jacob could not be certain that he had found favor with Esau, unless the present had been received; for in accepting it Esau necessarily became his friend, according to the custom of those times, and in that country. In the eastern countries, if your present be received by your superior, you may rely on his friendship; if it be not received, you have every thing to fear. It is on this ground that Jacob was so urgent with Esau to receive his present, because he knew that after this he must treat him as a friend.

=== Departure from the place of their encounter ===
Jacob declines to follow Esau to Mount Seir. H. E. Ryle suggests that Esau's assumption that Jacob would follow him, and Jacob's excuses for not doing to, confirm that "their natures remain the same: Esau's thoughtless, Jacob's calculating".

George Savran suggests that Jacob's avoidance of his brother is a metaphor for Israel being separate from their enemies such as Edom or an indicator of Jacob's reserved personality.

== In comparative mythology ==
A common motif in a vast number of world mythologies (especially in the Proto-Indo-European mythology) is a fight between the twins (or just brothers) in which the death of one creates the world or precedes an important event (e.g. Romulus and Remus, Cain and Abel). Moreover, in the Ashanti Region, a story about the supreme god Nyame and his two sons resembles this exact story. He intended to give the more fertile land to his elder son Bia, and the rest to Bia's brother Tano. Nyame sent his goat to tell his sons to come to him for their inheritance. The goat preferred Tano to Bia and told him to disguise himself as Bia and go to Nyame very early in the morning. When Nyame realized what had happened, it was too late to fix the error. Note that the goat soup and the goat skin is mentioned in the Esau and Jacob story.

The Soninke people of Mauritania have a story that also resembles the Jacob and Esau narrative. In it, king Mama Dinga sends his servant to bring him his eldest son after midnight so that he could tell him things he needed to know, as he felt he would die soon. As the servant was mistreated by all of his sons, except by the youngest one, he decided to tell him to disguise himself in his brother's robe and wear his arm ring. In this way, he tricked his blind father.
