= Abraham Furnerius =

Dutch painter

Abraham Furnerius (1628–1654) was a Dutch Golden Age draughtsman and painter who was a pupil of Rembrandt.

== Biography ==
He was born and died in Rotterdam. According to the RKD he was a Rembrandt pupil at the same time as Samuel van Hoogstraten, Philips Koninck and Govert Flinck. Though he died young, he established a workshop and became the teacher of Gerrit Battem. He was the brother-in-law of Philips Koninck, whose works are sometimes confused with his.

No extant paintings are securely ascribed to Furnerius. His surviving body of work consists of a large number of landscape drawings in ink or ink with wash.
