= Van Beijeren =

Van Beijeren is a surname. Notable people with the surname include:

- Abraham van Beijeren (c. 1620–1690), Dutch painter
- Geert van Beijeren (1933–2005), Dutch art dealer
- Leendert van Beijeren (1619–1649), Dutch painter
