= Cornelis Brouwer =

Dutch Golden Age painter

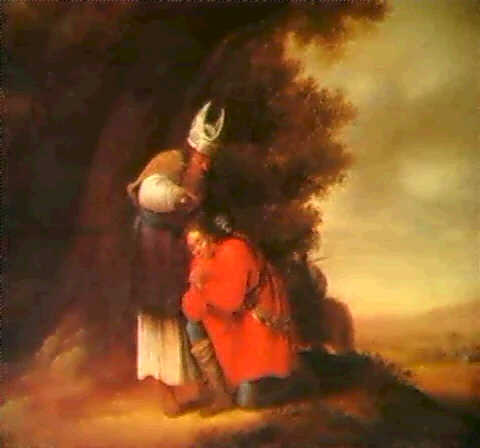
Anointing David.

Cornelis Brouwer (c. 1615, Rotterdam – 1681, Rotterdam), was a Dutch Golden Age painter.

== Biography ==
According to Houbraken he had been a Rembrandt pupil and was a friend of Eglon van der Neer who was Adriaen van der Werff's teacher for three years. While visiting with van der Neer, who took his pupil along on trips to Leiden and Amsterdam, Brouwer met Adriaen van der Werff and in 1676 helped the seventeen-year-old by taking his self-portrait and showing it to all of his art friends in Rotterdam, who were amazed at the ability of such a young man.

According to the Netherlands Institute for Art History (RKD) he is known for genre works and historical allegories of the Rembrandt school. He is sometimes confused with Justus Brouwer.
