= Gerrit Battem =

Painter from the Northern Netherlands

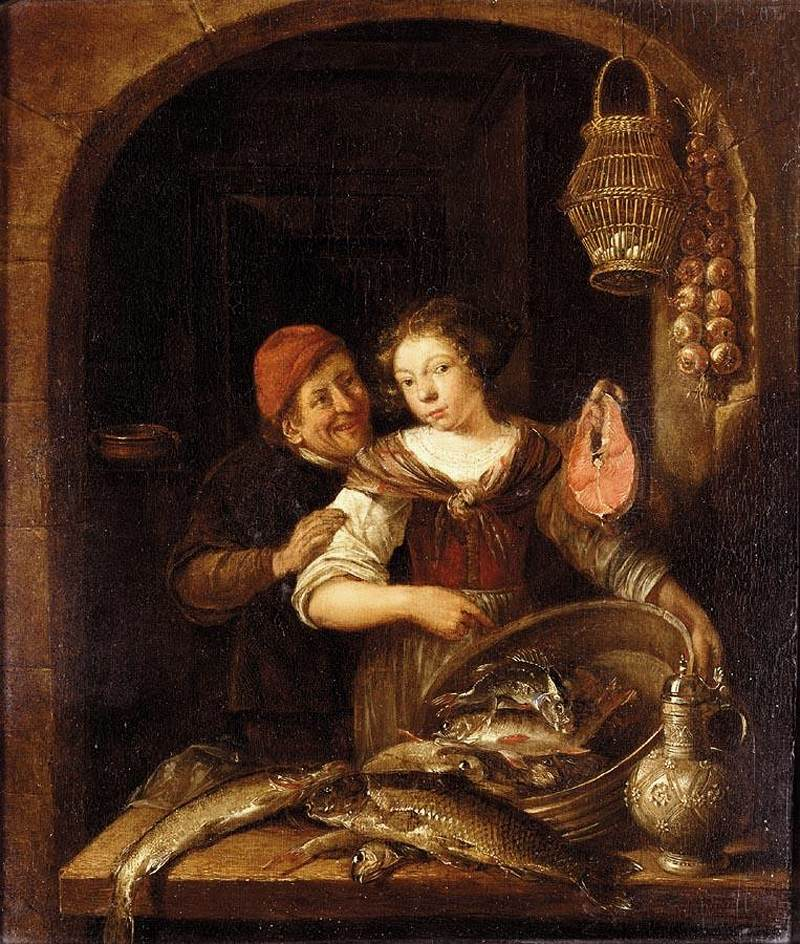
The fish seller

Gerrit Battem or Gerard van Battum (ca. 1636 - October 24, 1684 (buried)) was a Dutch landscape painter.

== Biography ==
Houbraken mentions drawings by Battem in the house of his patron Jonas van Witsen of Amsterdam, who bought them for 1300 guilders along with colored drawings by Adriaen van Ostade in the 1670s

According to the RKD, he was the son of the painter Gerrit Batton and he was the stepson of Jacob de Villeers. His mother Elisabeth Furnerius was probably the aunt of the painter Abraham Furnerius with whom he made a trip along the Rhine in 1650-1654.

Battem was born and died in Rotterdam, where he was mostly active. For three years he worked in Utrecht, and his trip along the Rhine may have been a large inspiration for his topics. He painted perspective views, mountainous scenery, with shepherds, robbers, etc. therein, as well as winter scenes. He painted at the same time as Snellings, but his style of painting is broader and bolder. In the 1670s he is said to have also painted figures in Jacob van Ruisdael's landscapes, though some doubt this.
