= Jan van Glabbeeck =

Dutch painter and art dealer

Jan van Glabbeeck (c. 1635, El Puerto de Santa María – 1686) was a Dutch painter and art dealer.

He was a pupil of Rembrandt and was very active in Amsterdam and Utrecht.

== Notes and references ==
- (in French) Bénézit, 1976
- Sumowski, Werner (1981). Strauss, Walter L. (ed.). Drawings of the Rembrandt School. Vol. 5. Abaris Books. p. 2449. ISBN 978-99912-70-24-1.
