= Christopher Paudiß =

Bavarian painter (1630–1666)

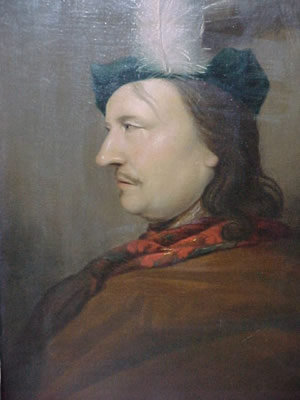
Self-portrait

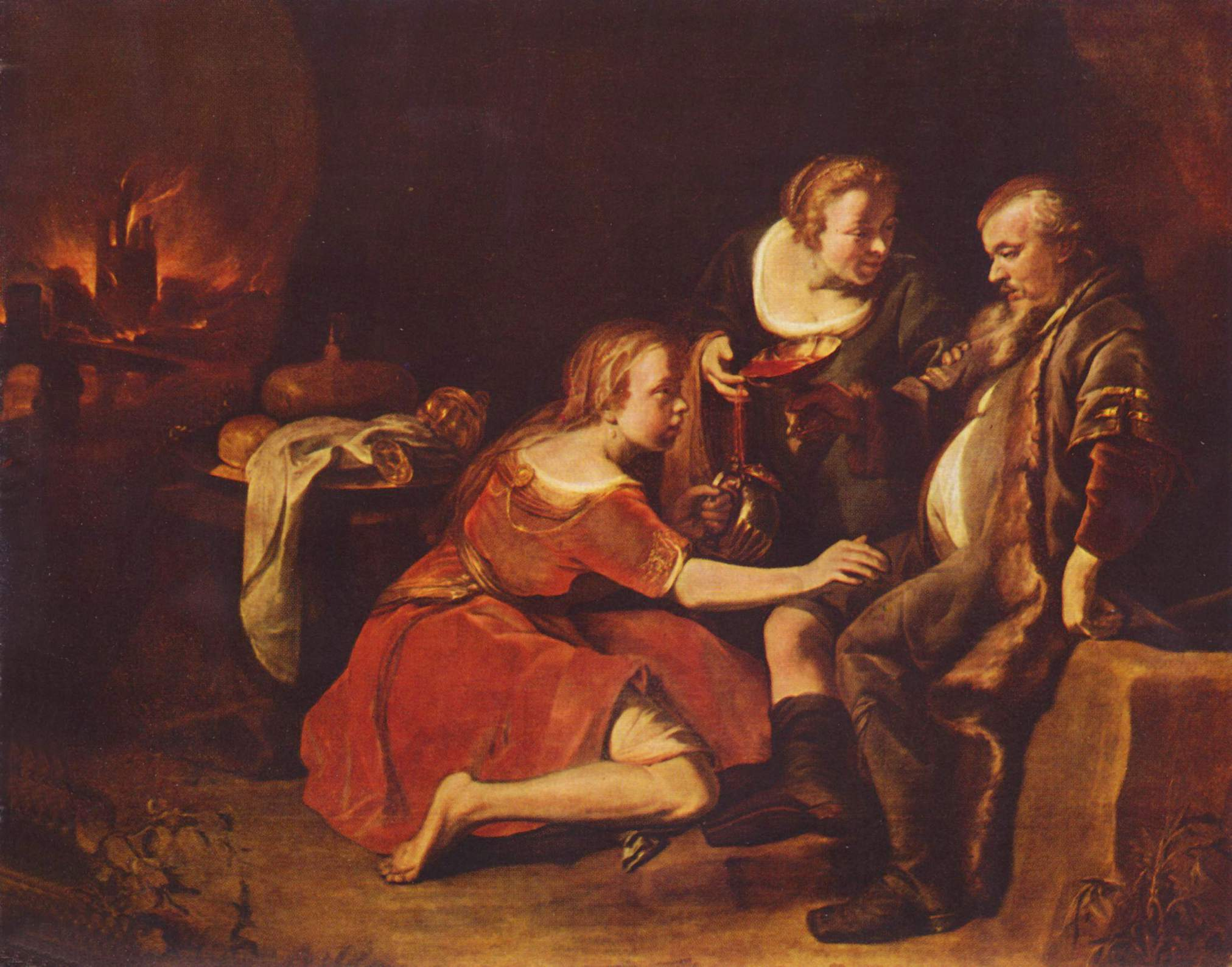
Loth und seine Töchter (around 1649, Budapest)

Christoph(er) Paudiß (1630 in Lower Saxony – 1666 in Freising, Upper Bavaria) was a Bavarian Baroque painter and a student of Rembrandt van Rijn.

== Life ==
After working in Stuttgart (1656), Prague, Dresden (1659–60), Vienna and Salzburg, he stayed his last four years in Freising where he worked for Fürstbischof Albrecht Sigismund von Bayern. He was married twice.

== Work ==
His paintings and frescoes show dark pictures of everyday life. The Freisinger Diözesanmuseum has the largest collection of his work (15), others are scattered around Europe.

=== List of paintings ===
(incomplete)

- Porträt eines jungen Mannes mit Pelzmütze, ca. 1660, Hermitage Museum St. Petersburg since at least 1859
- Porträt eines Mannes, private, um 1661 (Budapest)
- Der alte Bauer mit dem Kälbchen und dem Metzger, 1662, Dombergmuseum Freising
- Frierende Kinder
- Der Marodeur
- Self-portrait
- Bildnis eines Heiducken in hoher Mütze, 59 x 51,5 cm, Gemäldegalerie Alte Meister Dresden, Kat. 1930, Nr. 1995
- Küchenstillleben (55 cm x 69,5 cm)
- Küchentisch mit Pfeife, Heringen und Bier
- Der Bauer und das Kälbchen, 1662
- Vertreibung aus dem Tempel
- Heimkehr vom Markt
- Marter des Hl. Thiemo, 1662, Kunsthistorisches Museum Vienna, Nr. GG 2284

== Sources ==
- Karl Bosl: Bosls Bayerische Biographie, Regensburg, Pustet, 1983, pp. 574–575
