= Reynier van Gherwen =

Dutch Golden Age painter

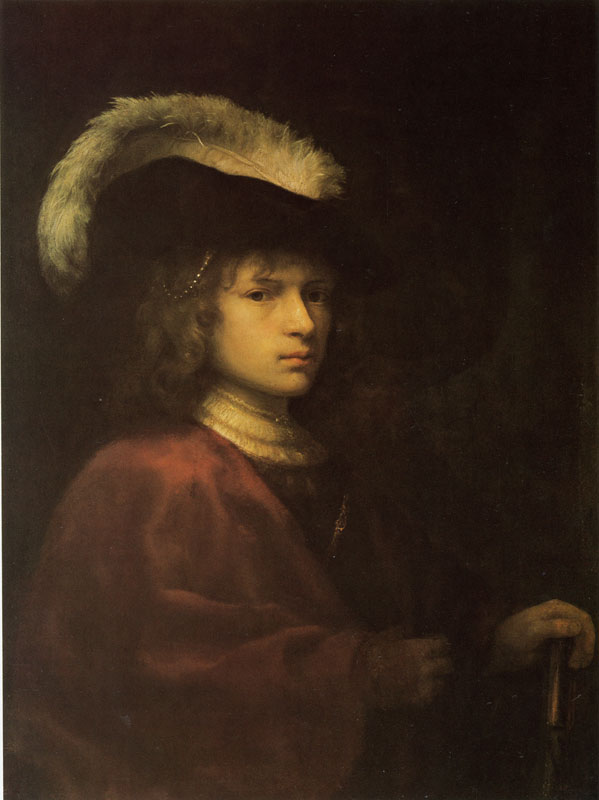
- Born: 1620; Leiden
- Died: 1662 (aged 41–42); Leiden

Reynier van Gherwen or Gherwen (1620–1662) was a Dutch Golden Age painter from Leiden best known as a pupil of Rembrandt.

Gherwen was born in Leiden and became a member of the Confrerie Pictura in 1659.

Gherwen died in Leiden.
