= Jan van Hoogstraten =

Dutch painter

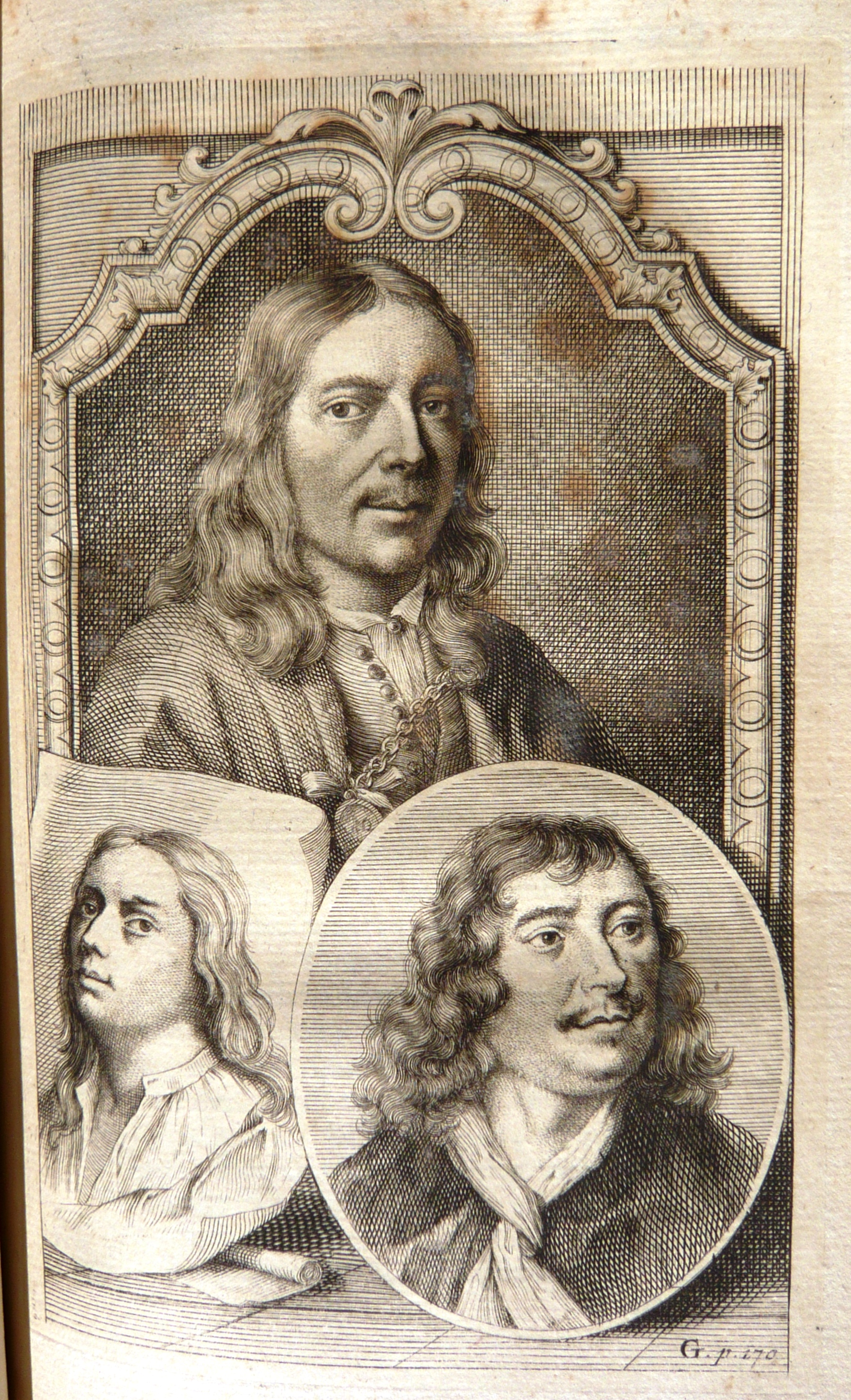
Portrait of the brothers Jan (left) and Samuel van Hoogstraten (center with medaillon) with the portrait of Johannes Lingelbach (right), in Arnold Houbraken, "Schouburg, Volume II', 1719

Jan van Hoogstraten (26 January 1628 – 28 July 1654) was a Dutch Golden Age painter who died young in Vienna, where he was living with his older brother Samuel van Hoogstraten.

== Biography ==
Jan van Hoogstraten was born in Dordrecht. According to Houbraken he was the son of the painter Dirk van Hoogstraten and became a master in the Dordrecht Guild of St. Luke in 1649. He travelled with his brother Samuel to Vienna to work at court, and died there at a young age in 1653.

In his biographical sketch of him, Houbraken included a story about his work methods in Vienna, whereby just after he arrived there he had won a commission to paint the Denial of Peter, a popular subject at that time. He had finished the servant girl, and went to the market to find a proper St. Pieter. Not speaking German, he managed to convince a suitable beggar to follow him back to his studio, and the good man thought he would receive alms at the door, but when he was beckoned upstairs and saw the skull and other vanitas attributes set out on a table, he panicked and ran outside, where Samuel van Hoogstraten, just returning and thinking he was a thief, managed to catch him. The townspeople had a good laugh when all was settled, and the poor man was finally convinced to sit in a role as St. Peter, but the whole while he was so frightened and nervous that the painting was well executed indeed. Despite the success of the painting, the poor man refused to sit again for the Hoogstraten brothers, because he felt he had seen death and the devil there.

According to the RKD he is known for landscapes and seascapes. He was in Dordrecht until 1652 and travelled to Vienna, where he died.

He was buried in the St. Stephen's Cathedral, Vienna, where a sculpting friend of Samuel's made a small marble sculpture of a child at his grave, as a monument to his memory. It is unknown whether Jan had accompanied his brother on his trip to Rome beforehand, or that he had remained in Vienna after Samuel's first trip there when his audience with Ferdinand III, Holy Roman Emperor took place on June 23, 1651. Samuel's brother François van Hoogstraten later wrote a poem in memory of Jan, and later named his son after him, who also became a poet.
