= Leendert van Beijeren =

Dutch Golden Age painter

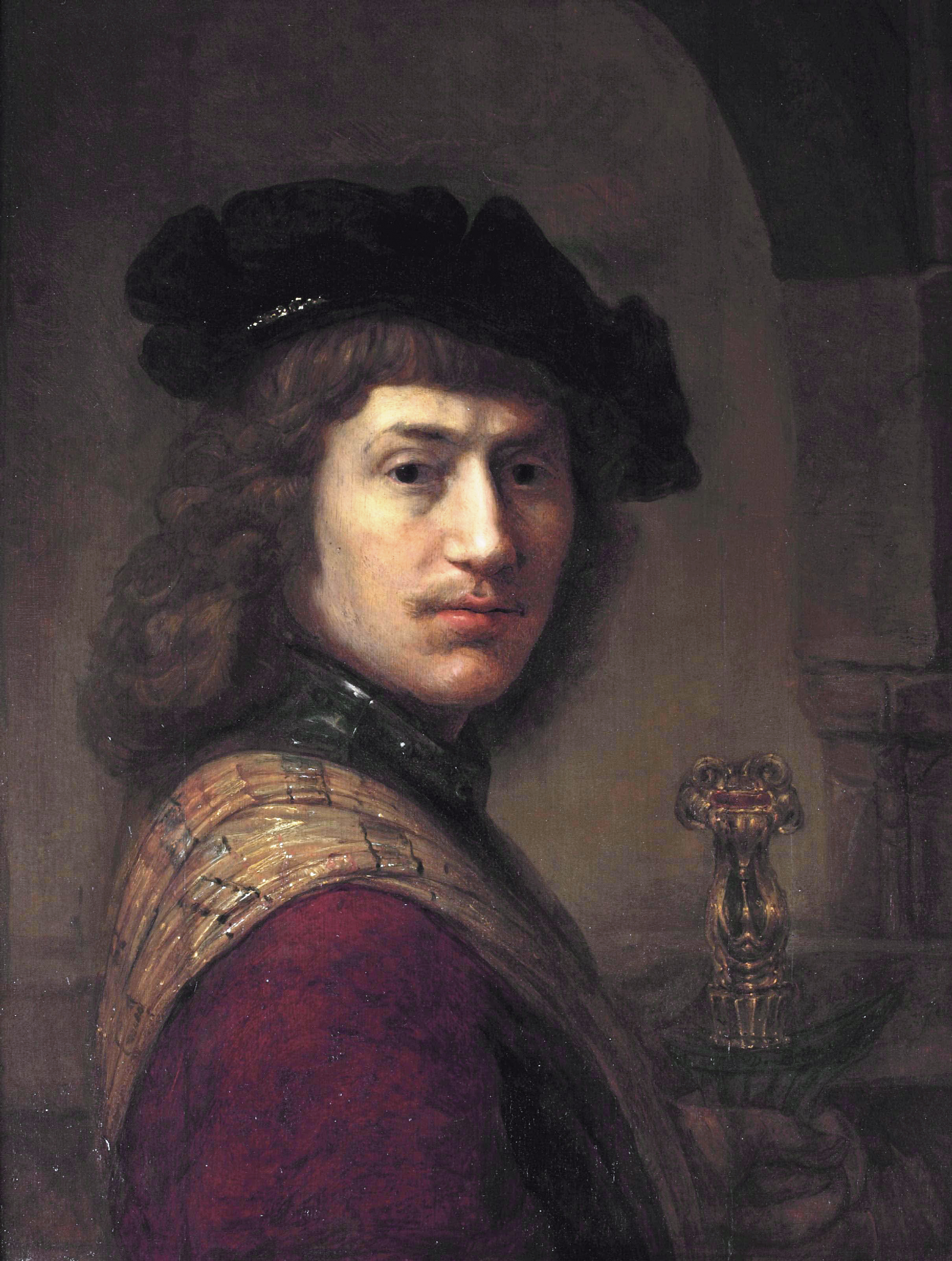
- Self-portrait
- Born: 1619; Amsterdam
- Died: 1649 (aged 29–30); Amsterdam

Leendert van Beijeren (1619–1649) was a Dutch Golden Age painter from the Dutch Republic.

Beijeren was born in Amsterdam where he became a pupil of Rembrandt.

He died in Amsterdam.
