= Gerrit Willemsz Horst =

Dutch Golden Age painter

- Born: 1612; Muiden
- Died: 1652 (aged 39–40); Amsterdam

Gerrit Willemsz Horst (1612–1652) was a Dutch Golden Age painter from the Dutch Republic.

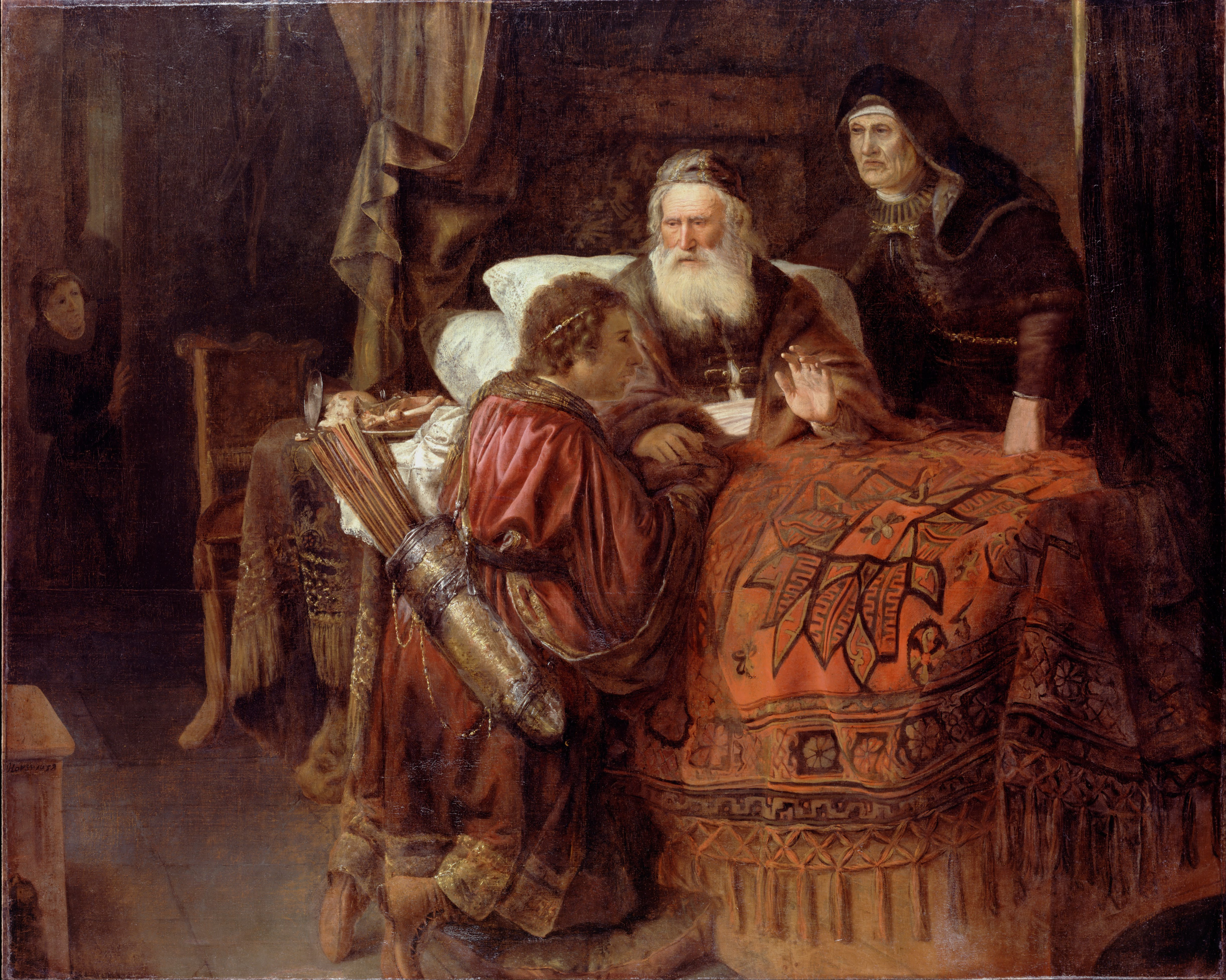
Isaac blessing Jacob, Dulwich Picture Gallery

Horst was born in Muiden and became a pupil of Antonie Hendricksz Lust in June 1626. He is also recorded as a pupil of Rembrandt during the years 1635/1640. He died in Amsterdam.
