= Dirk van Hoogstraten =

Dutch Golden Age painter (1596–1640)

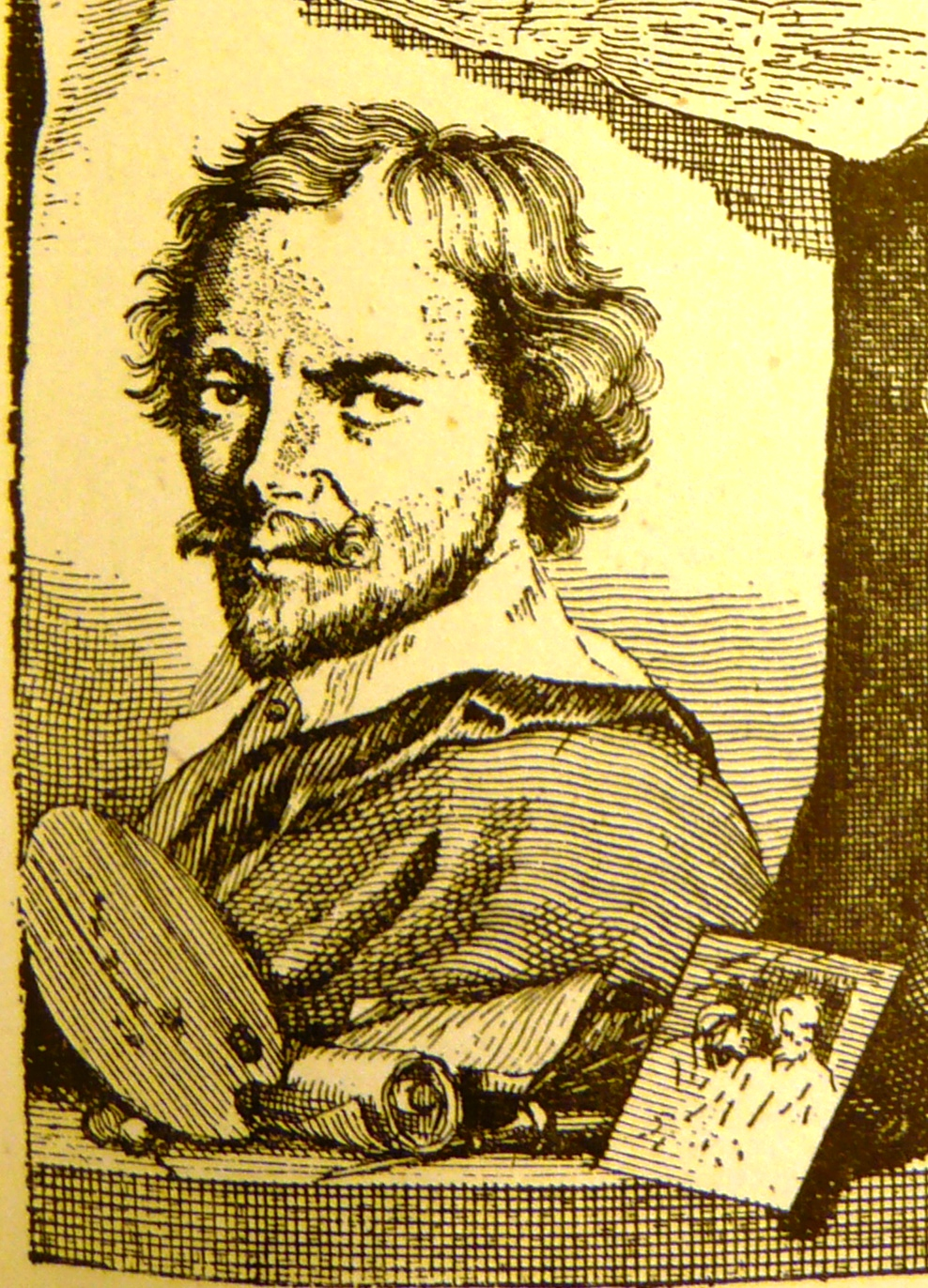
- 'Dirk van Hoogstraten in vol.1 of Houbraken's "Schouburg", 1718.
- Born: Dirk van Hoogstraten; 1596; Antwerp
- Died: 1640 (aged 43–44); Dordrecht
- Known for: Painting
- Movement: Baroque

Dirk van Hoogstraten (1596–1640) was a Dutch Golden Age painter, and father of Samuel Dirksz van Hoogstraten.

== Biography ==
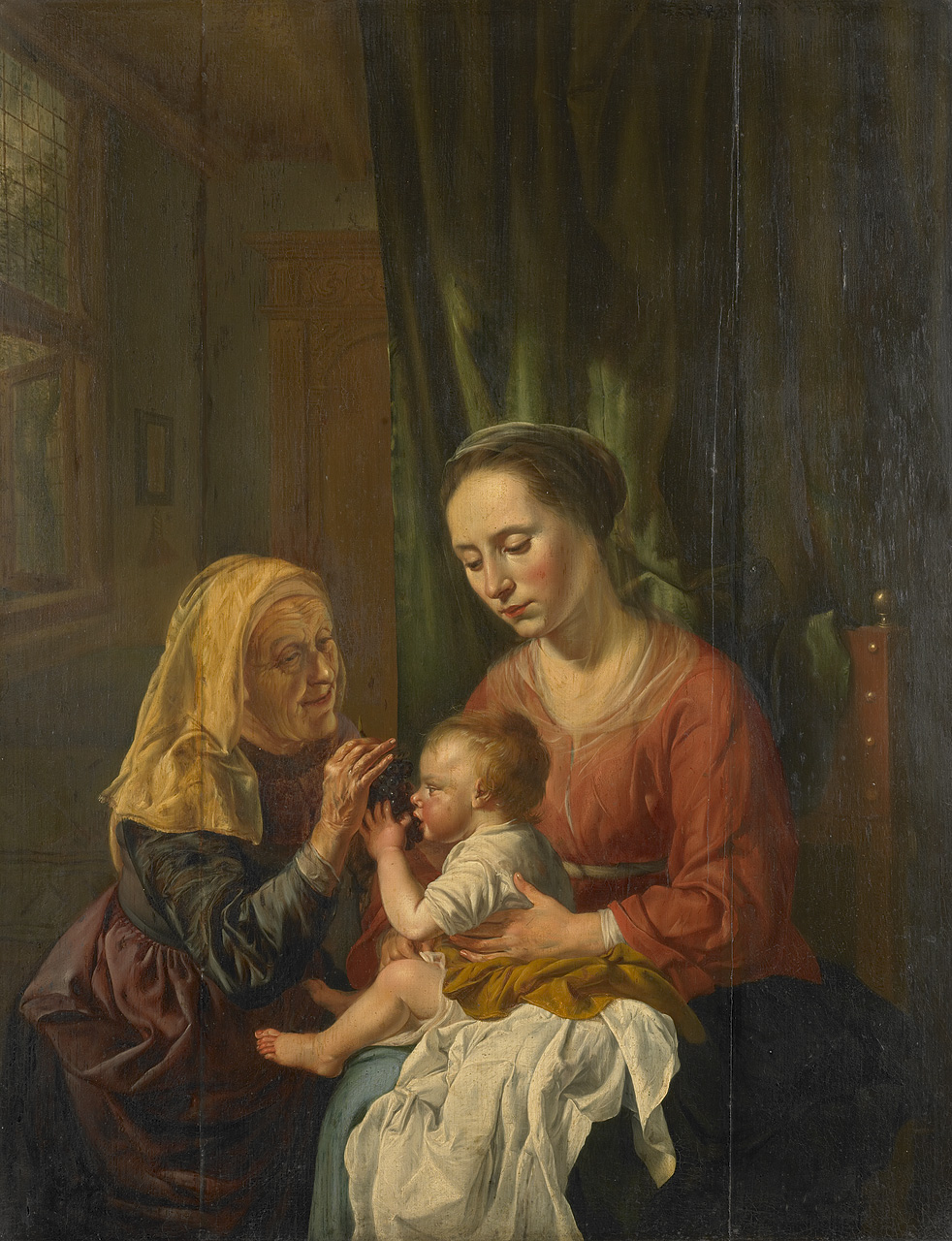
Madonna with child and St. Anne, 1630.

Dirk's father Hans (1568–1605) emigrated to Dordrecht after Dirk was born. Dirk's family were Mennonite refugees. In the Spanish Netherlands Anabaptism was illegal since the siege of Antwerp in 1585.

He became apprenticed to a silversmith, and learned drawing and engraving, but according to Houbraken he wanted to learn the new German method of gold- and silver-plating, so he undertook a journey to Germany. There he met some Dutch painters and became more drawn to drawing and painting. He stayed on there some years with success. Houbraken tells of an instance where he fell ill and the woman who let him a room tended to him and sent for the priest. He spat out the sacramental bread, because he didn't want to die a Catholic, and this was found later under his bed by the woman, and at Easter she told him he had to move out. When he returned home his father was astonished that his son was not a master smith, but a master painter. According to the RKD he travelled to Italy in 1623 and became a member of the Dordrecht Guild of St. Luke in 1624, where he also married in 1626.

== Paintings ==
Very few works remain by Dirk van Hoogstraten. Houbraken claims he made a print from his own drawing called "Ecce Homo" that was quite good. Though little work remains that is attributed to him, he is known for prints, drawings and paintings, as well as some gold- and silver-smith work. Besides his sons Samuel and Jan, he was the teacher of the painters Nicolaes Couwenbergh and Ossewaert.
