= Samuel Dirksz van Hoogstraten =

Painter and writer from the Northern Netherlands

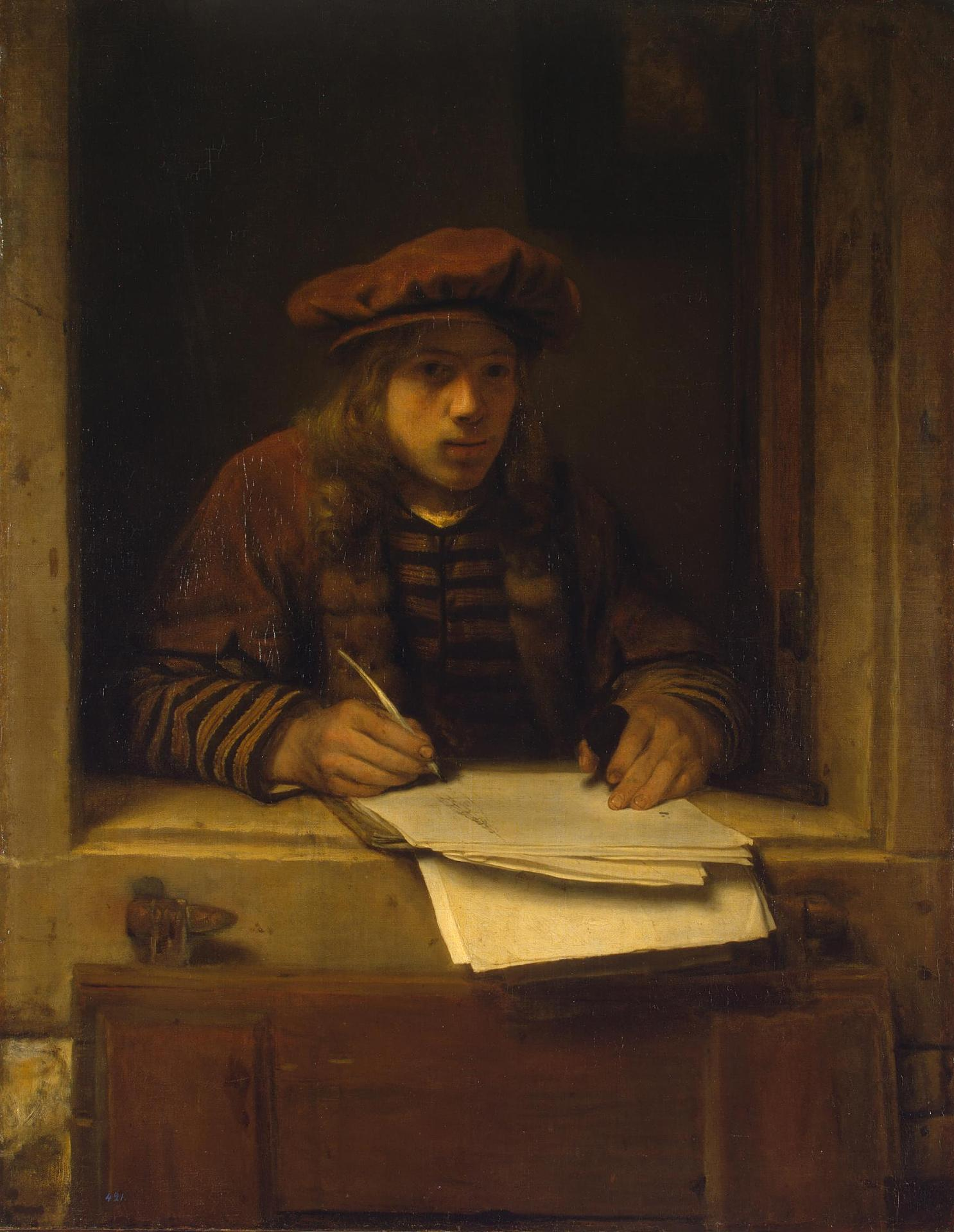
- Self-portrait ca. 1647
- Born: Samuel van Hoogstraten; 2 August 1627; Dordrecht
- Died: 19 October 1678 (aged 51); Dordrecht
- Known for: Painting, writer
- Movement: Baroque

Samuel Dirksz van Hoogstraten (2 August 1627 in Dordrecht – 19 October 1678 in Dordrecht) was a Dutch Golden Age painter, who was also a poet and author on art theory.

== Biography ==
Samuel Dirksz van Hoogstraten trained first with his father Dirk van Hoogstraten and stayed in Dordrecht until about 1640. On the death of his father, he moved to Amsterdam where he entered the workshop of Rembrandt. A short time later, he started out on his own as a master and painter of portraits.

He later made several travels which took him (1651) to Vienna, Rome and London, finally retiring to Dordrecht. There he married in 1656, and held an appointment as provost of the mint.

== Paintings and etches ==
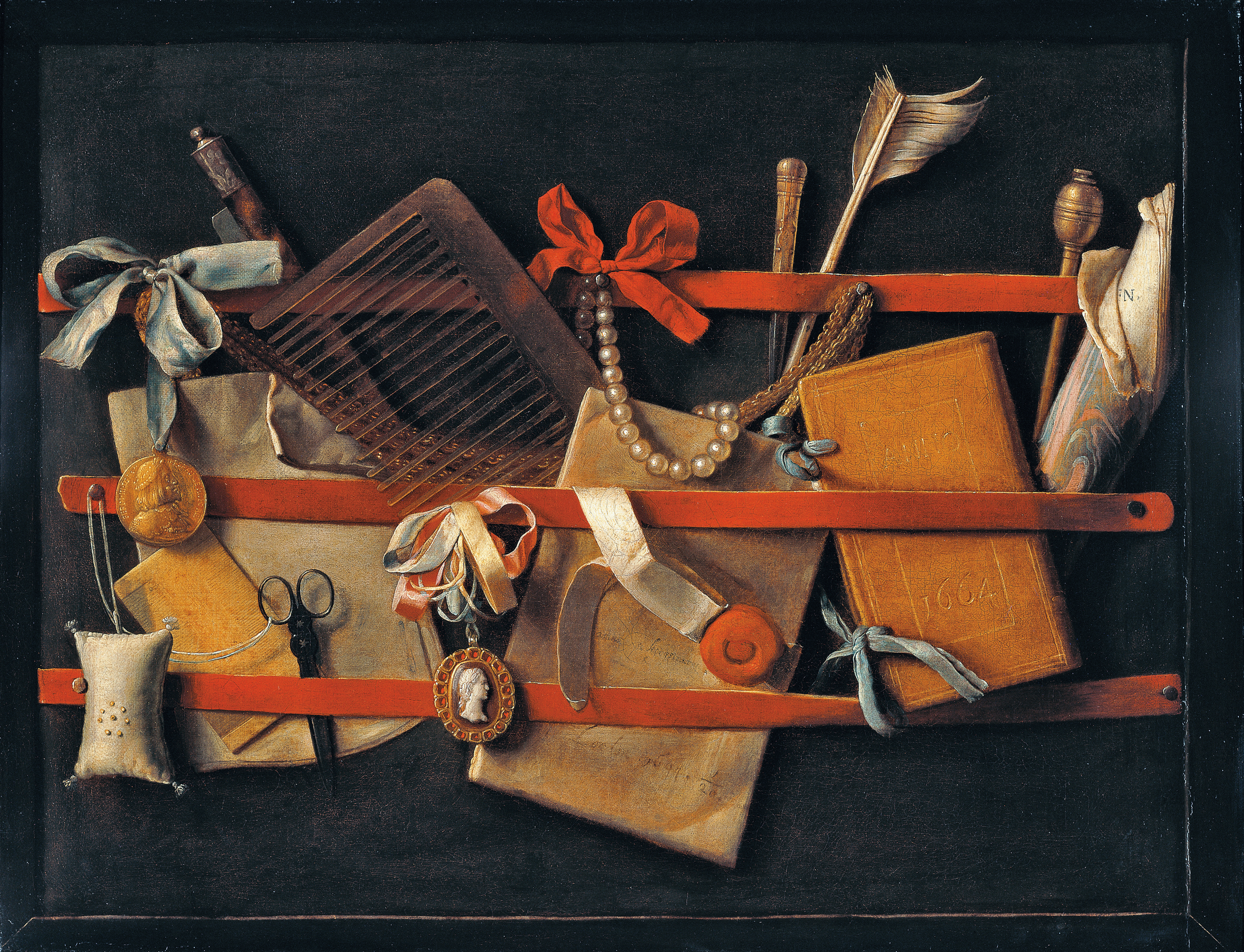
Trompe-l'œil still life, 1664

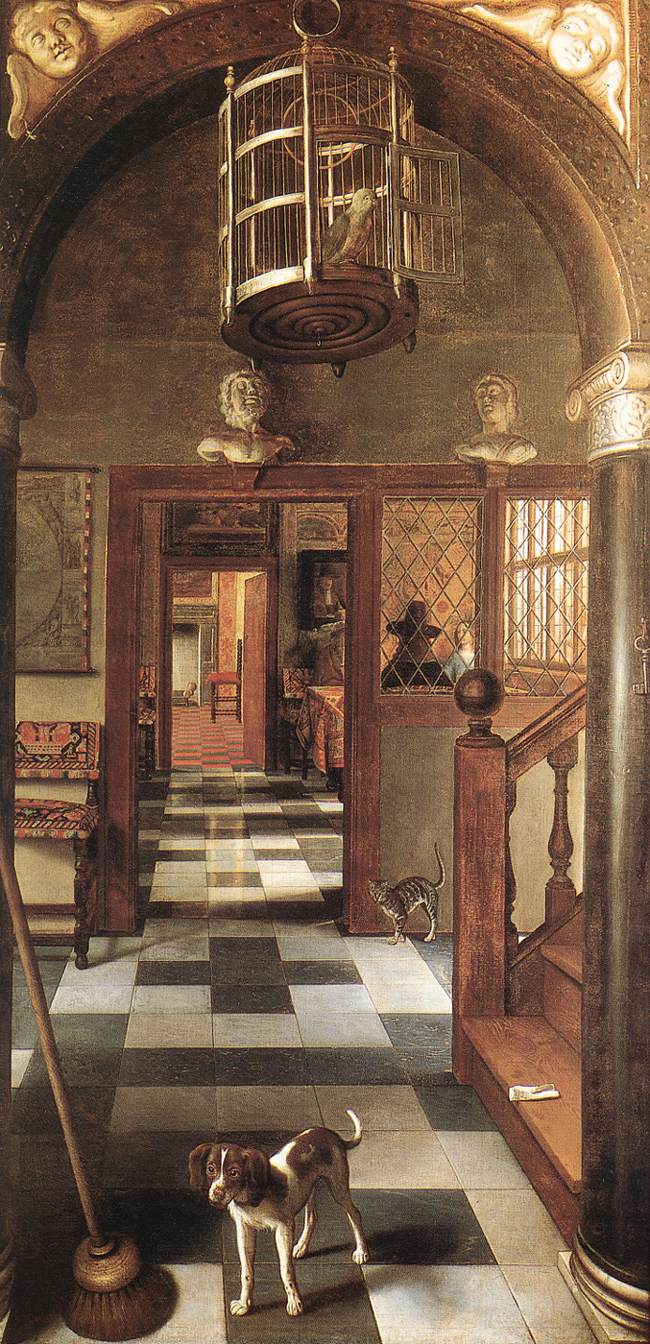
View of a Corridor, Dyrham Park, 1662

A sufficient number of Van Hoogstraten's works have been preserved which show that he strove to imitate different styles at different times. In a portrait dated 1645, currently in the Lichtenstein collection in Vienna, he imitated Rembrandt. He continued in this vein until as late as 1653 when he produced a figure of a bearded man looking out of a window. This, one of the more characteristic examples of his style, is exhibited in the Kunsthistorisches Museum, Vienna. He was also skilled at trompe-l'œil still lifes.

A view of the Vienna Hofburg, dated 1652, displays his skill as a painter of architecture. In contrast, a piece at the Hague representing a "Lady Reading a Letter as she crosses a Courtyard" (Mauritshuis) or a "Lady Consulting a Doctor," (in the Rijksmuseum at Amsterdam), imitates de Hooch. Chronologically, onf of his last extant works is a portrait of Mathys van den Brouck, dated 1670.

Hoogstraten also employed his skill with perspective to construct "peepshows", or "perspective boxes". For example, A Peepshow with Views of the Interior of a Dutch House is a box with convincing 3D views of the interior of a Dutch house when viewed through peepholes on either end of the box. One of his perspective boxes is displayed at the National Gallery in London. It shows the interior of a typical Dutch house of his time.

He produced many etchings as well, and some of his plates are still preserved. His self-portrait, engraved by himself at the age of fifty, still exists.

His pupils were his younger brother Jan van Hoogstraten, Aert de Gelder, Cornelis van der Meulen, and Godfried Schalcken.

== Literary work ==
=== Art theoretician ===
Van Hoogstraten's fame derives from his versatile career as a painter, poet and zealous social climber. Besides painting and directing a mint, he devoted some of his time to literary labours. His magnum opus is a book on painting, the Introduction to the Academy of Painting, or the Visible World (original title: 'Inleyding tot de hooge schoole der schilderkonst: anders de zichtbaere werelt', Rotterdam, 1678) which is in length and theoretical scope one of the most ambitious treatises on the art of painting published in the Dutch Republic in the seventeenth century. It covers issues such as pictorial persuasion and illusionism, the painter's moral standards and the relation of painting to philosophy, referring to various ancient and modern authors. While reacting to international, mainly Southern European ideas on painting which Van Hoogstraten may have encountered during his travels, the treatise also reflects contemporary talk and thought on art from Dutch studios. He wrote it as a sequel to Karel van Mander's early-17th-century book on painting and painters entitled Het Schilder-Boeck. One of van Hoogstraten's many students, Arnold Houbraken, later wrote the book entitled The Great Theatre of Dutch Painters, which included a biography of his teacher. This biography is the basis of most of the information that we have about van Hoogstraten today.

=== Sonnets and tragedies ===
Van Hoogstraten also composed sonnets and tragedies. We are indebted to him for some of the familiar sayings of Rembrandt.

== Gallery ==
Samuel Dirksz van Hoogstraten's paintings

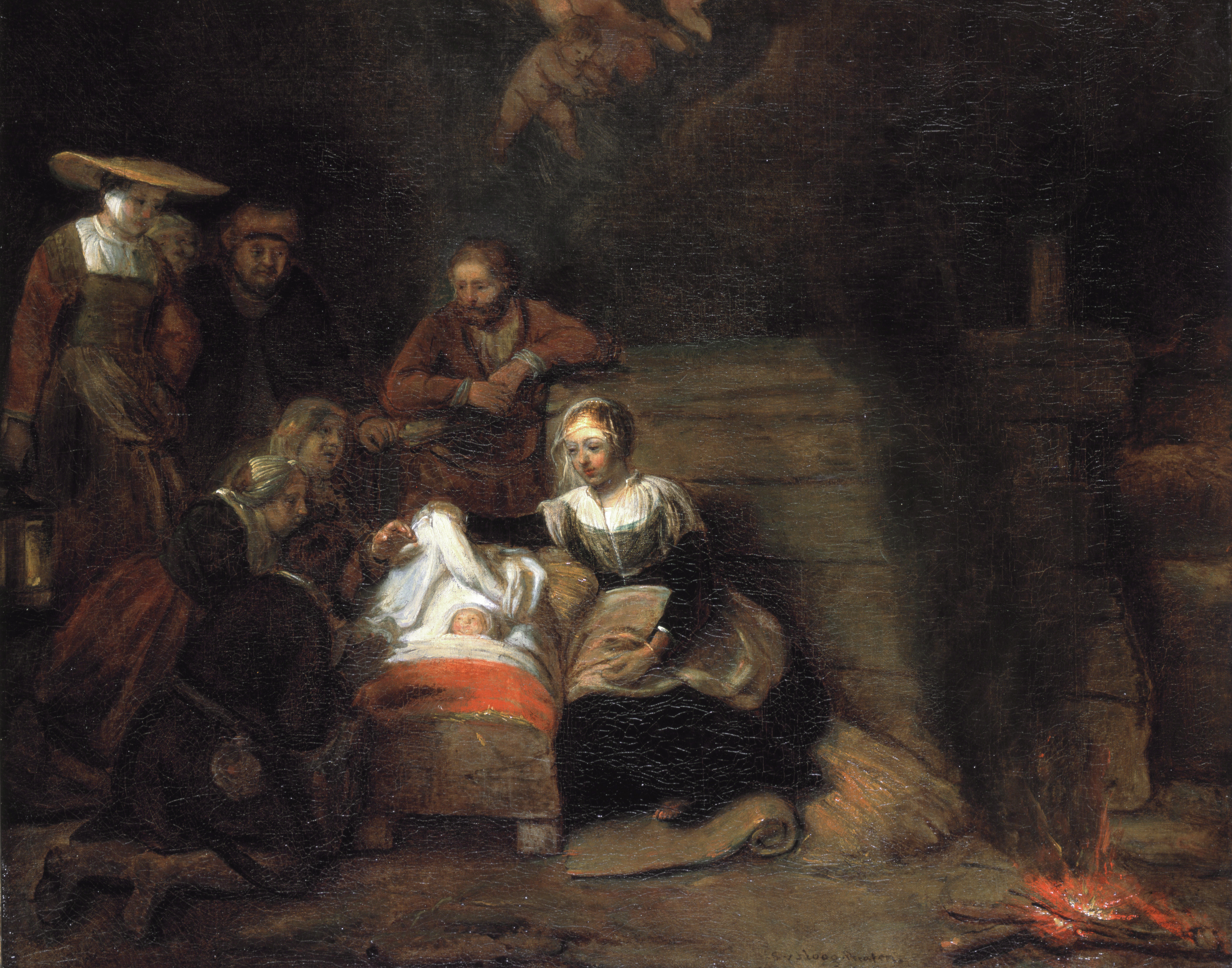
Adoration of the Shepherds, 58.2 × 70.8 cm, 1647

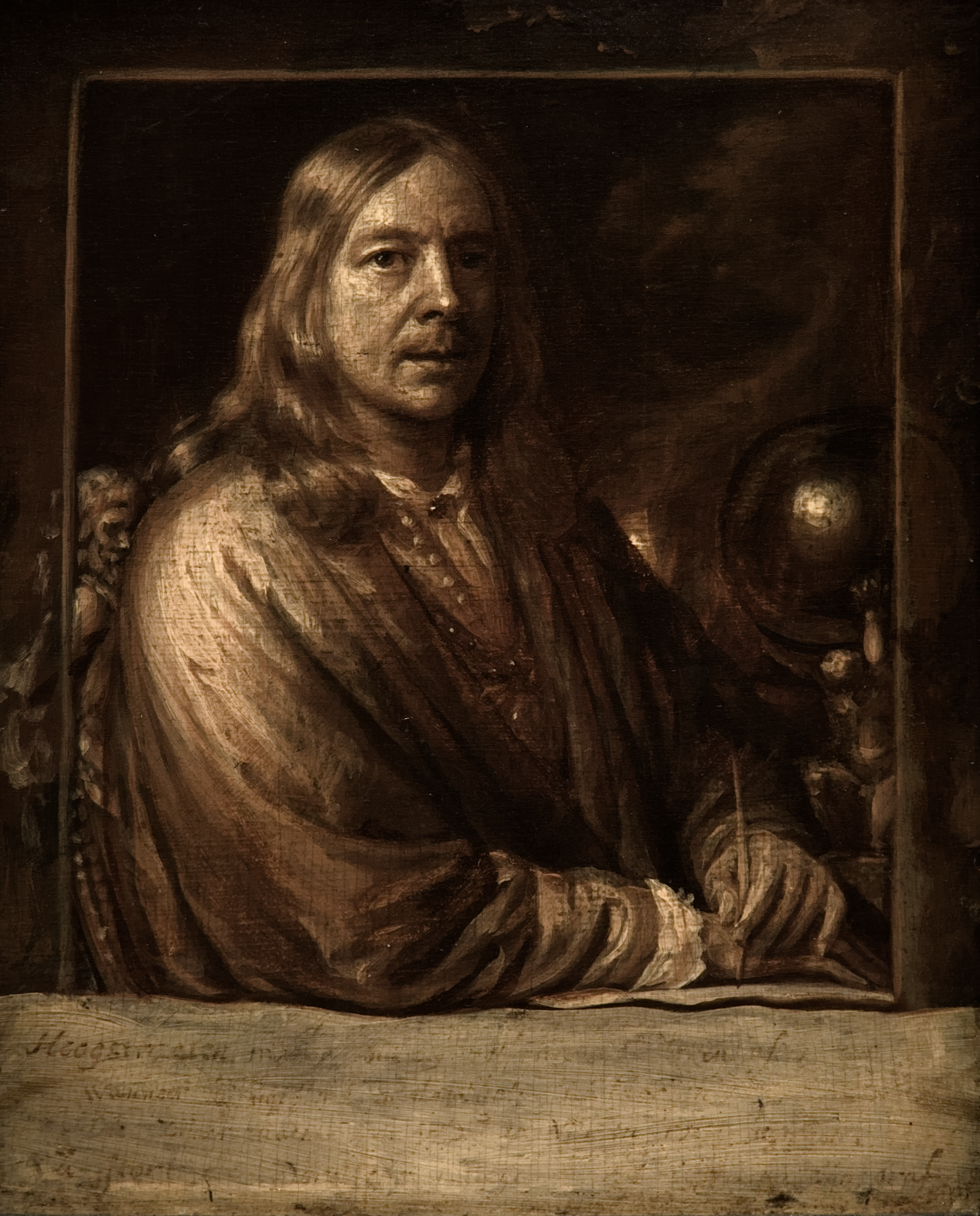
Brunaille Self-Portrait, 1677, Panel, 20 x 16.4 cm, Dordrechts Museum

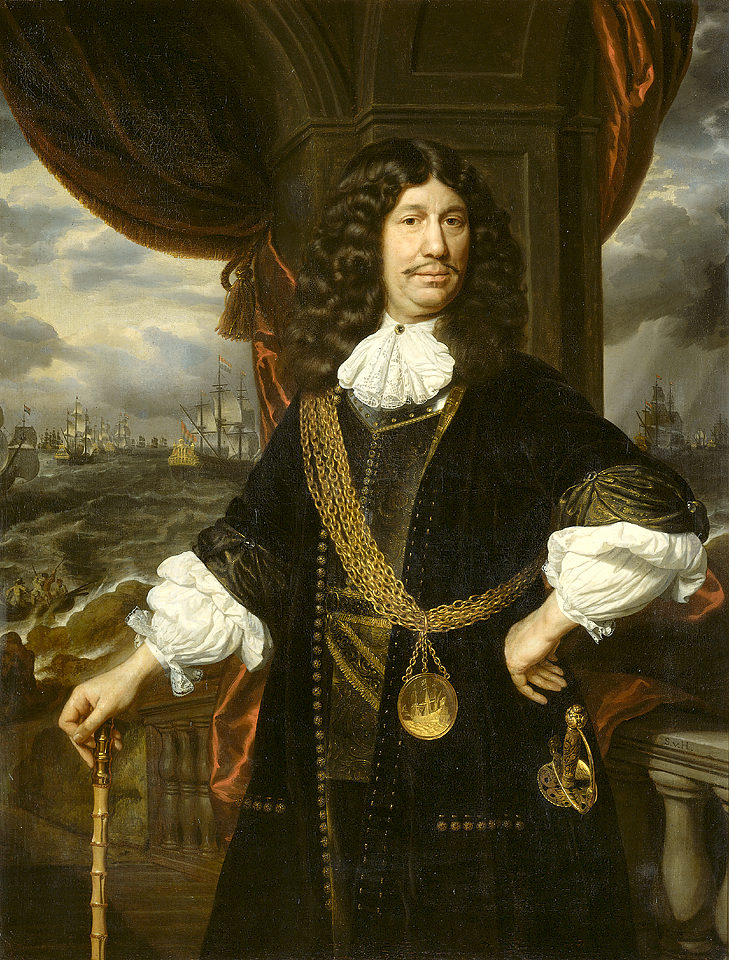
Portrait of Mattheus van den Broucke (1620–85), Governor of the Indies, with the gold chain and medal presented to him by the Dutch East India Company in 1670

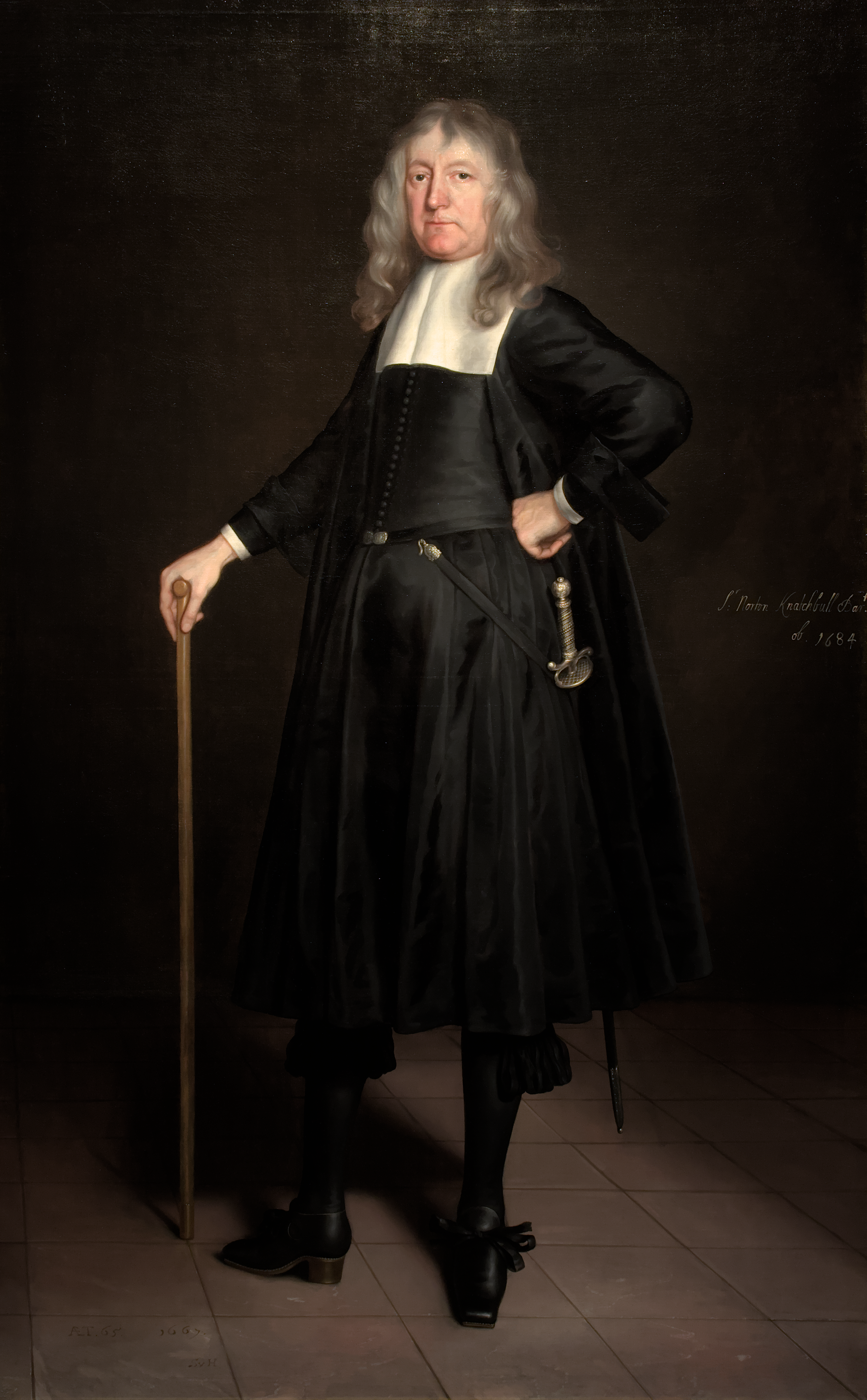
Portrait of Norton Knatchbull, Canvas, 208.5 x 131.5 cm, Dordrechts Museum

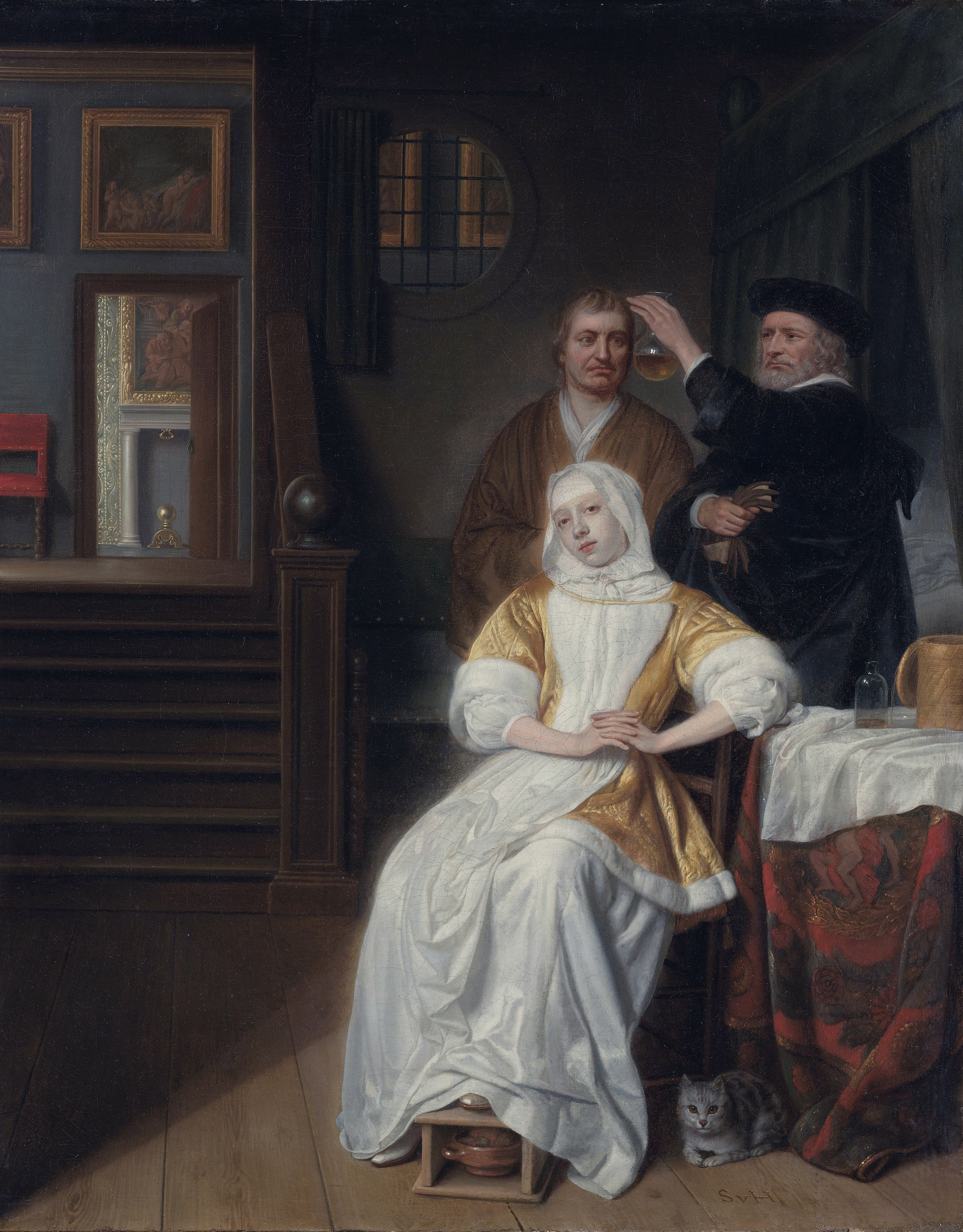
The anemic lady, c. 1667

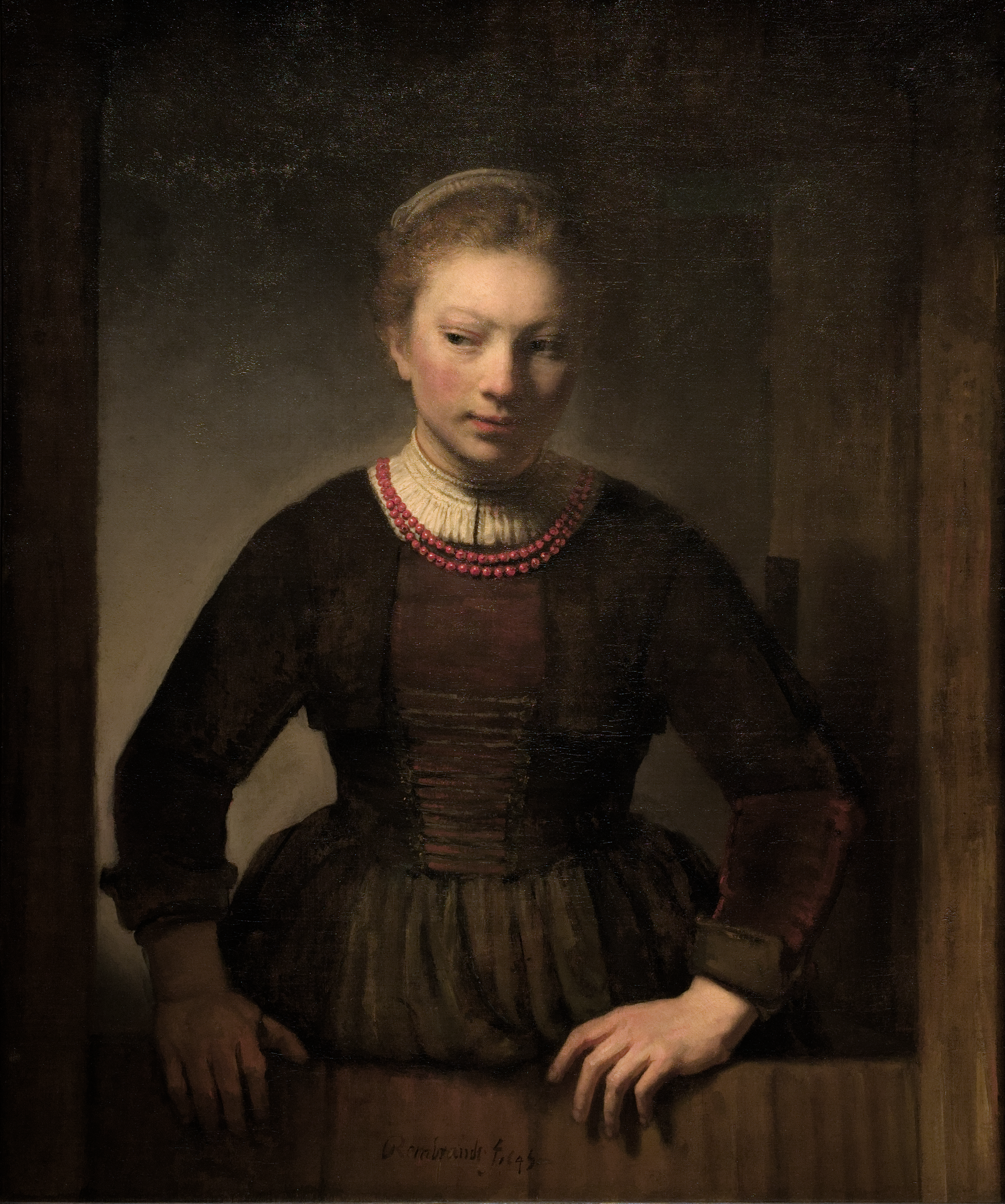
Young woman at half-door, 1645, Canvas, 102.5 x 85.1 cm, Art Institute of Chicago

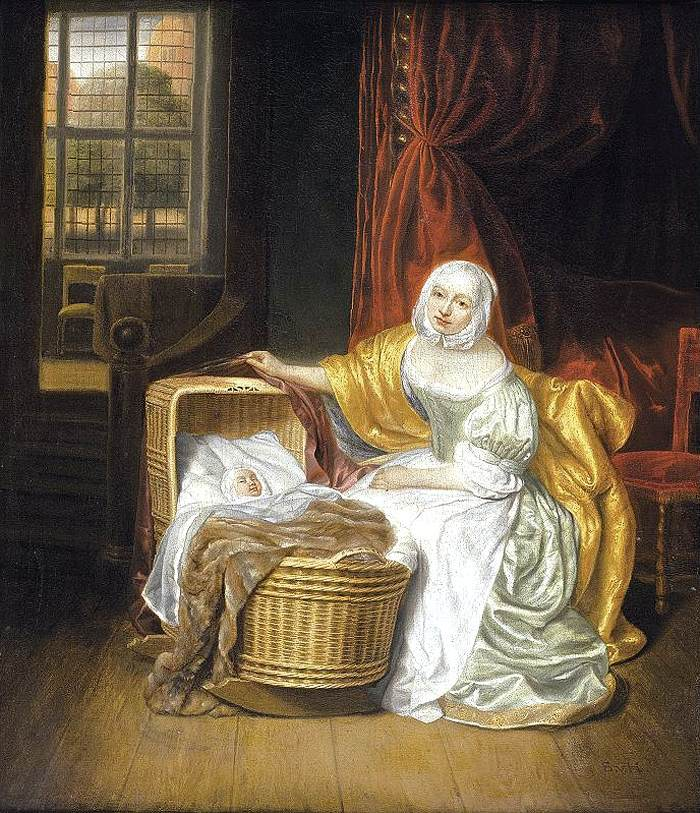
Mother with a Child in a Wicker Cradle, second half of 17th century

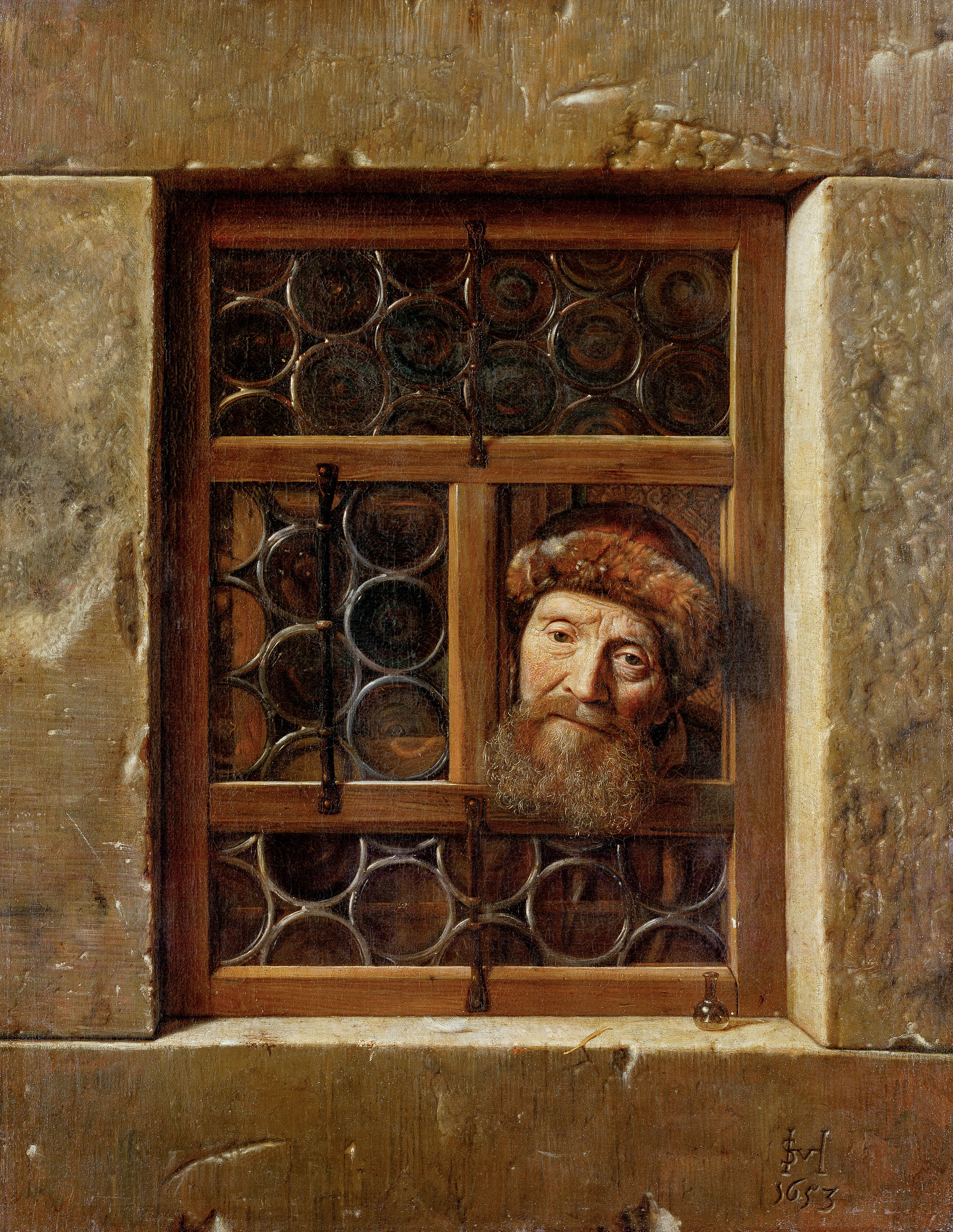
Hoogstraten's Man at a Window, 1653 (Kunsthistorisches Museum, Vienna)

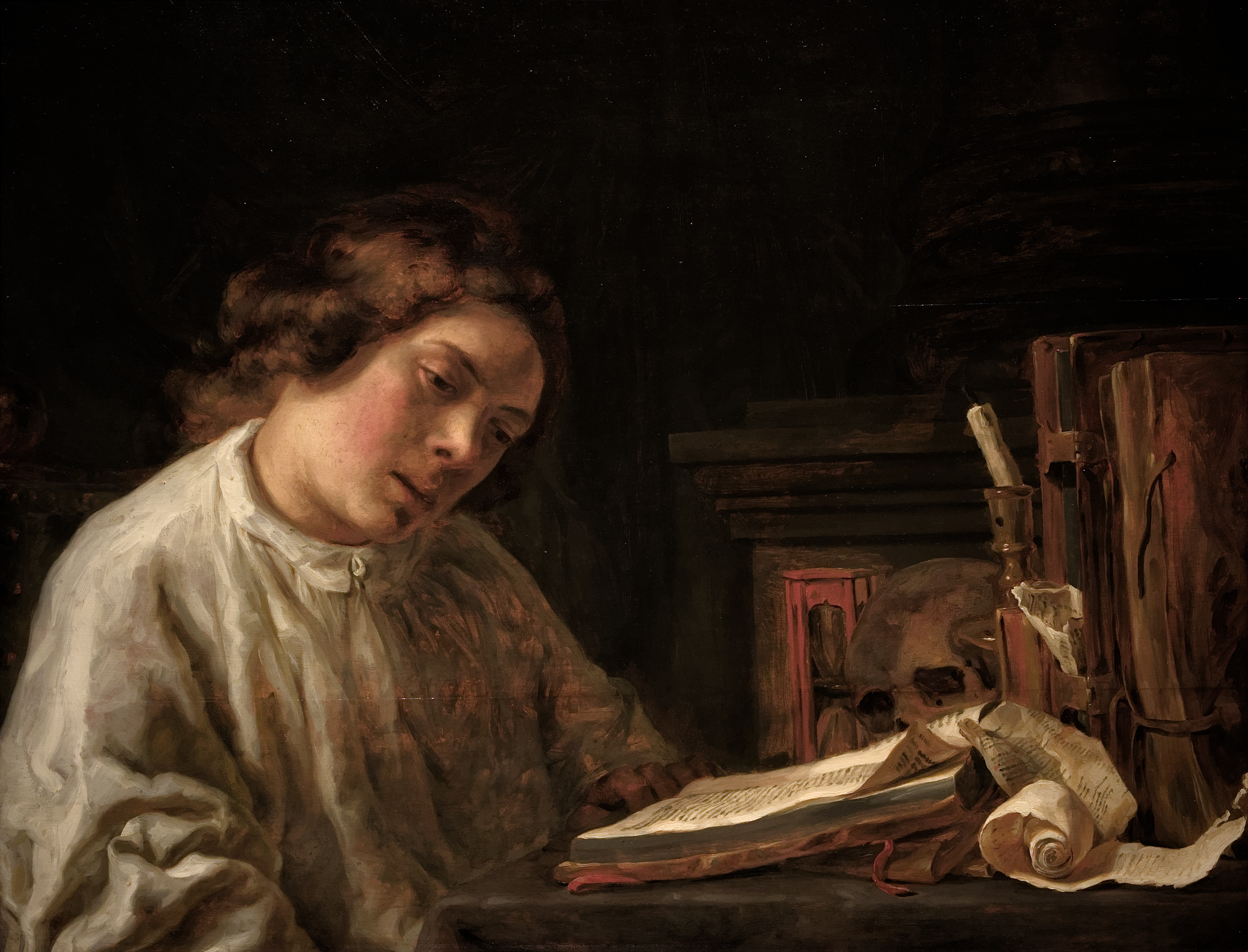
Young man reading with Vanitas still life, Panel, 58 x 74 cm, Museum Boijmans Van Beuningen

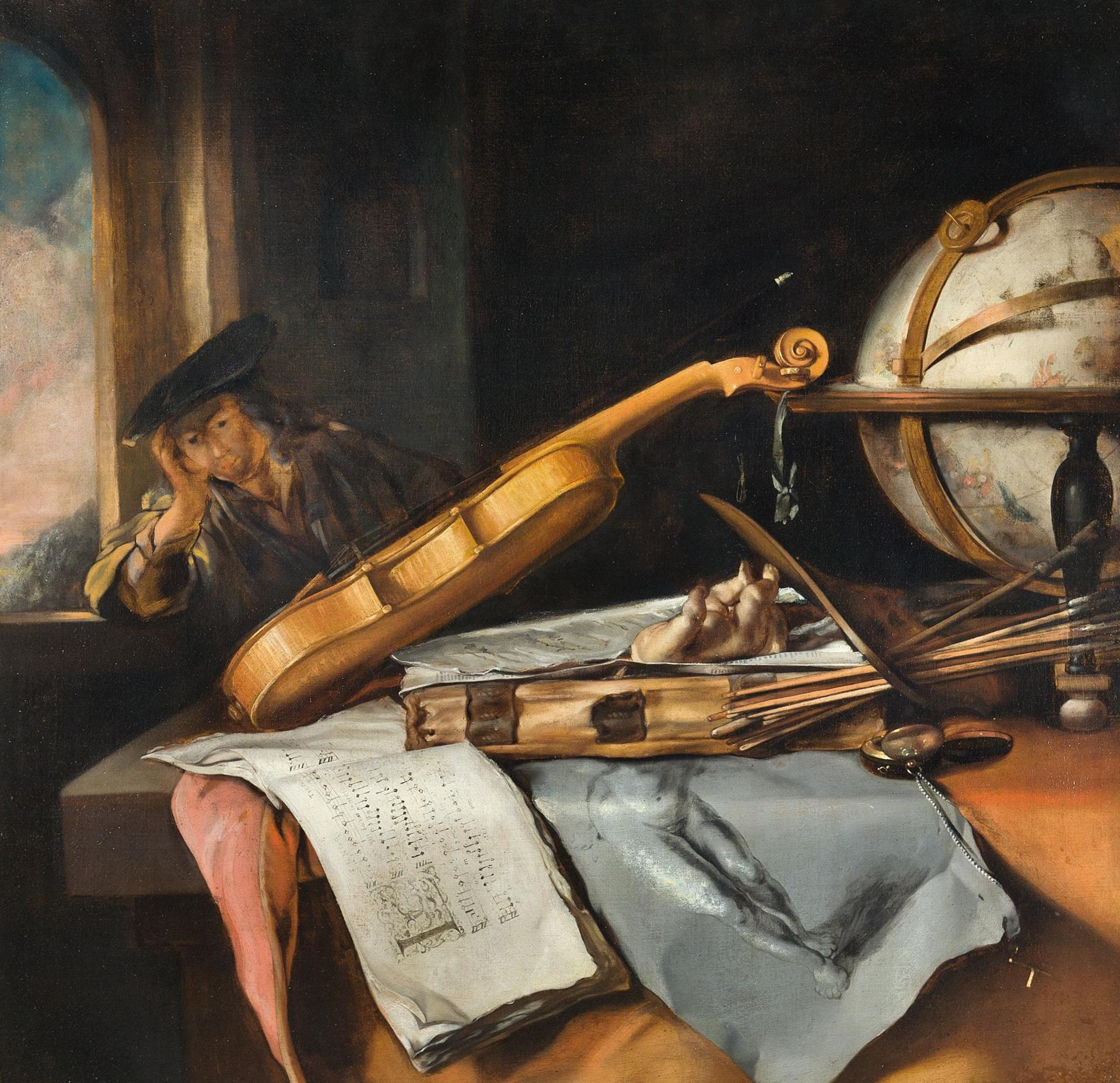
Vanitas, 87.6 × 89.5 cm, 1640

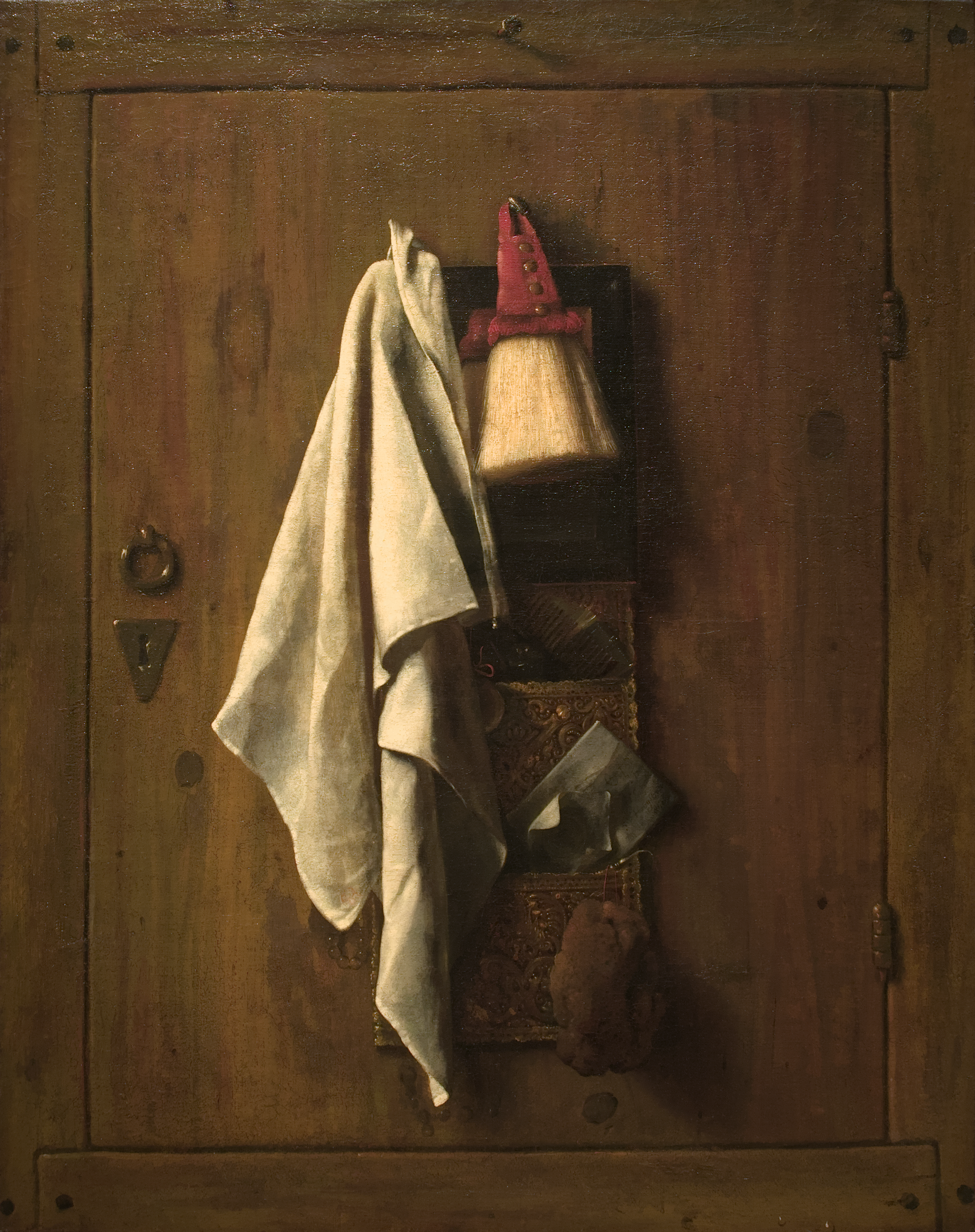
Trompe-l’œil still life, 1655, canvas, 92,5 x 72cm, Academy of Fine Arts Vienna

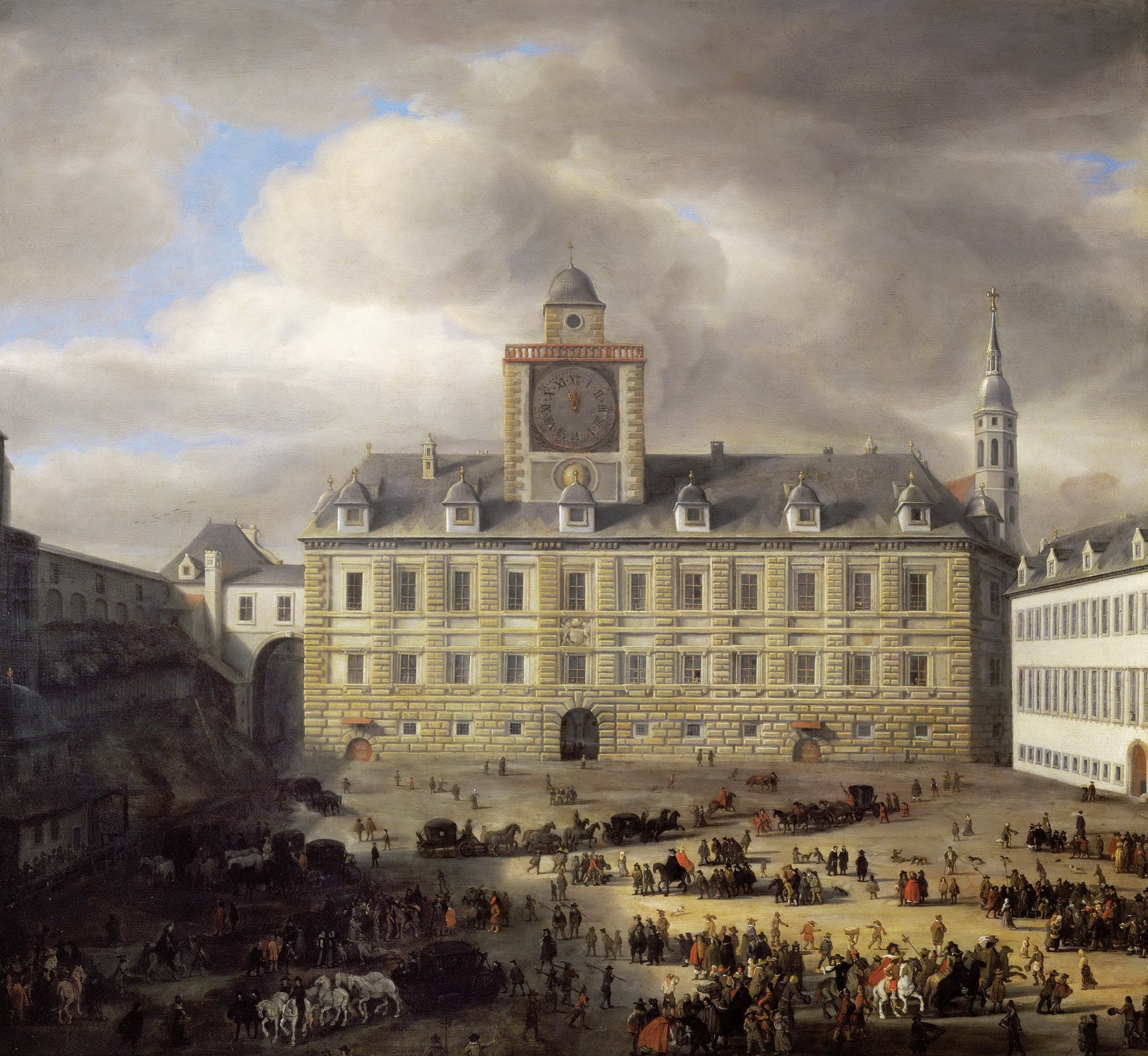
Inner courtyard of the Vienna Hofburg, 1652, Panel, 78.6 x 84.5 cm, Kunsthistorisches Museum Vienna

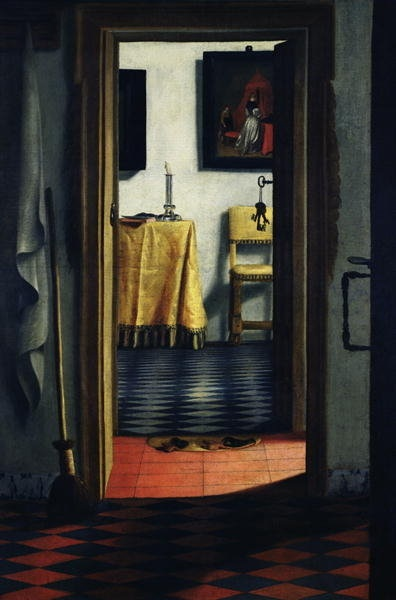
View of a Corridor, c. 1670

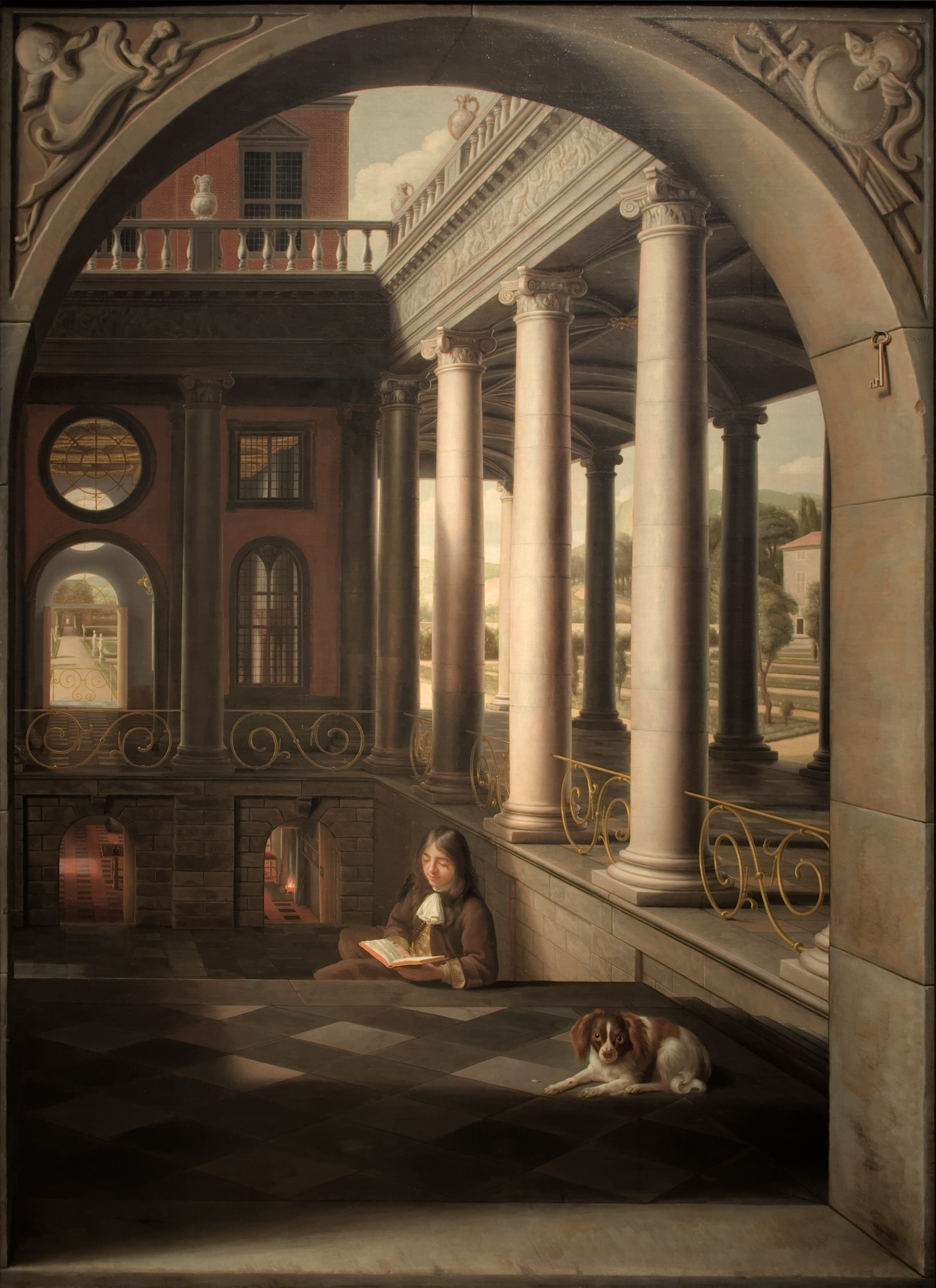
Perspective view with a young man reading in a renaissance palace, 1662/67, Canvas, 238.5 x 174 cm, Dordrechts Museum

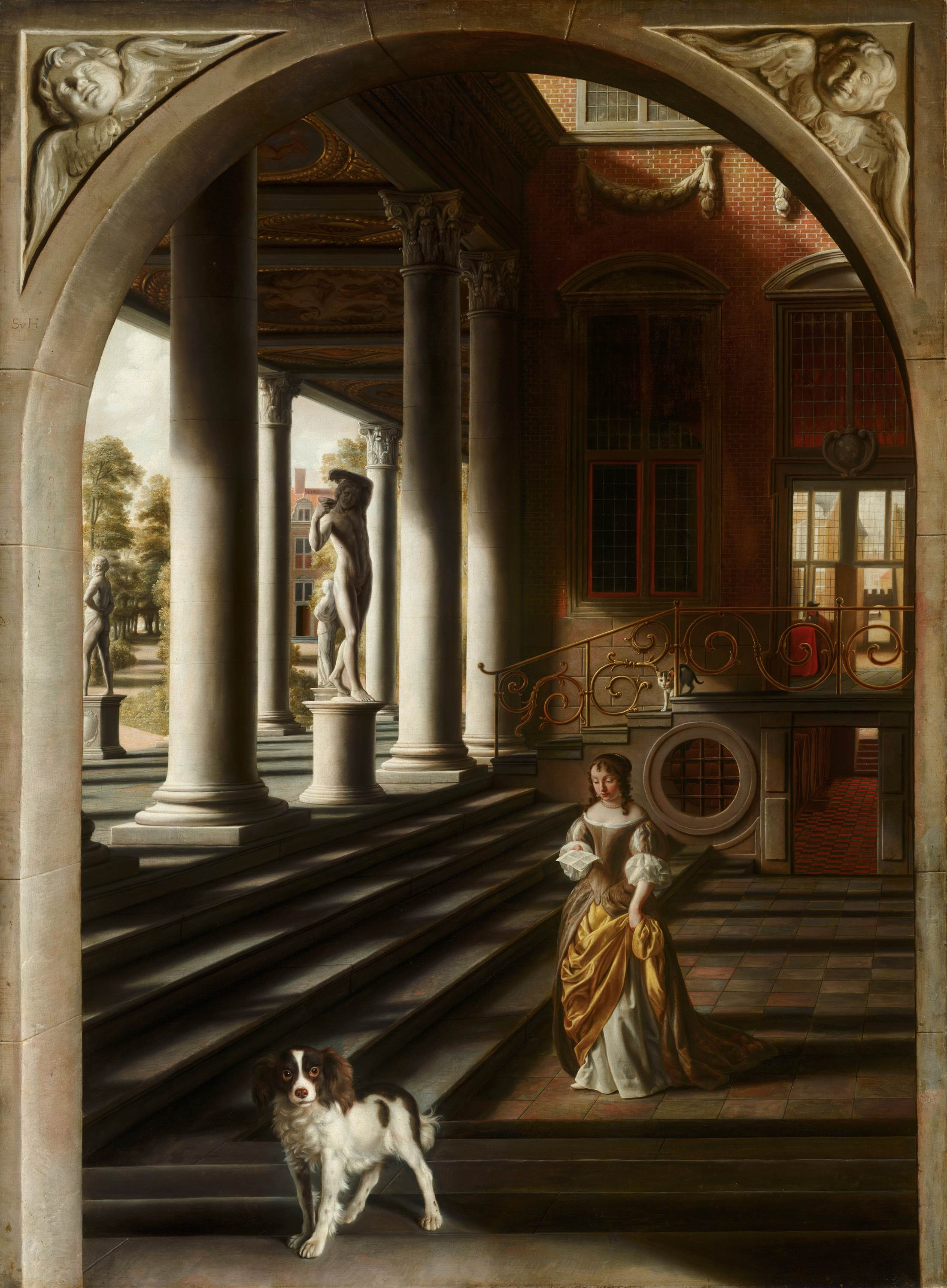
Perspective View with a Woman Reading a Letter, 1670, Canvas, 214 x 179 cm, Royal Picture Gallery Mauritshuis

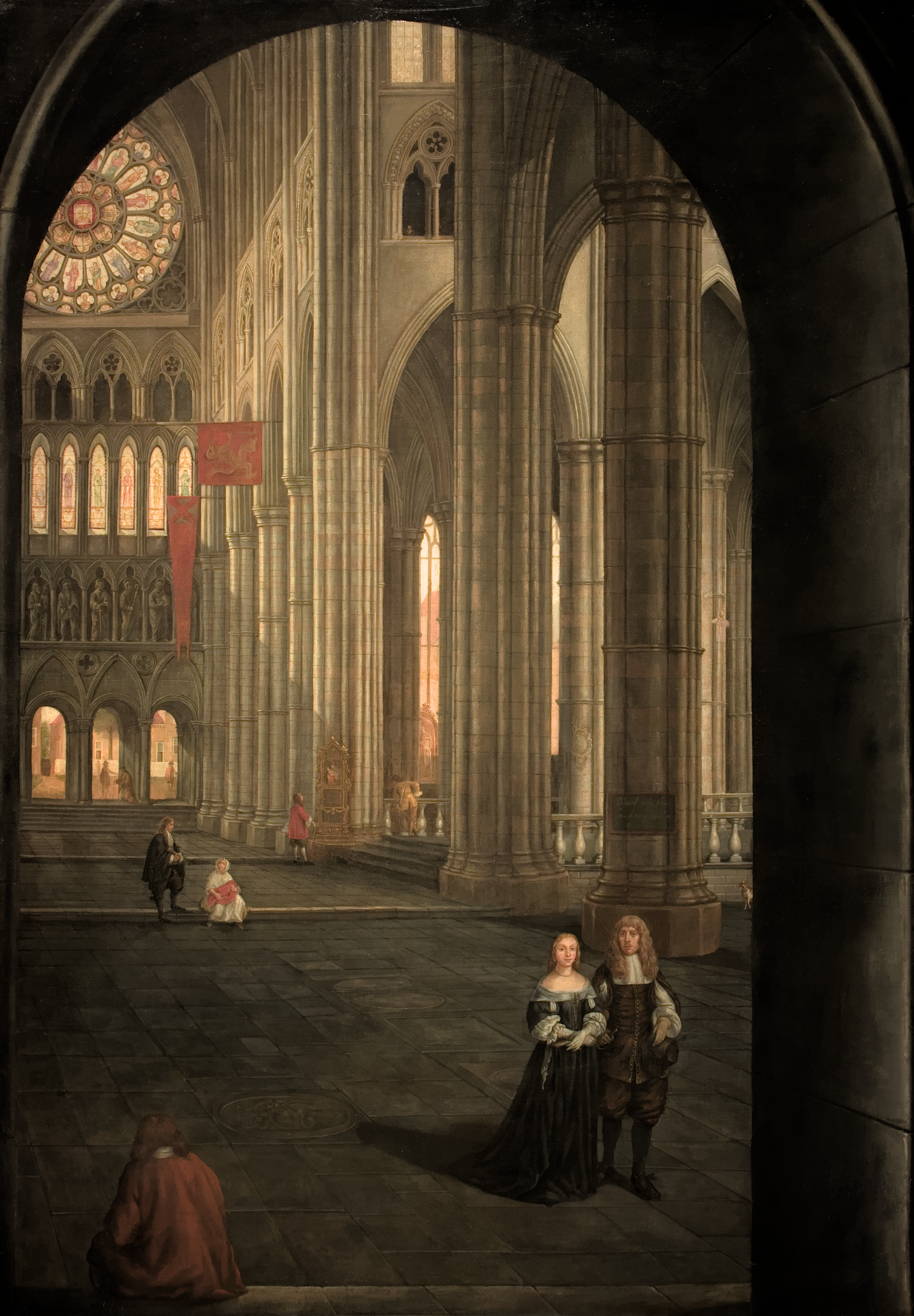
View of the north transept of Westminster Abbey, 1662/67, Canvas, 156 x 110 cm, Dordrechts Museum

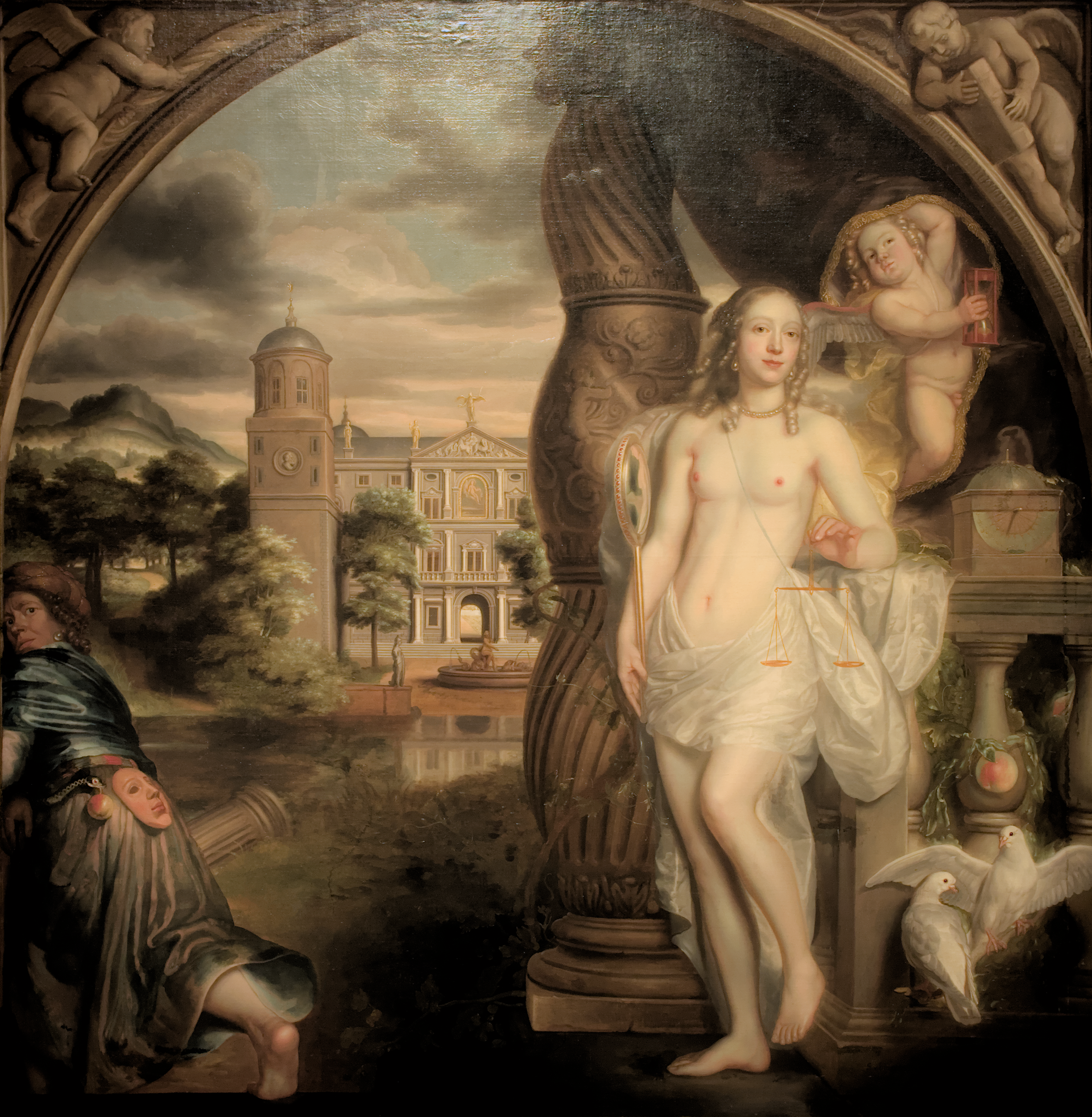
The triumph of truth and justice, 1670, Canvas, 205 x 200 cm, Private collection

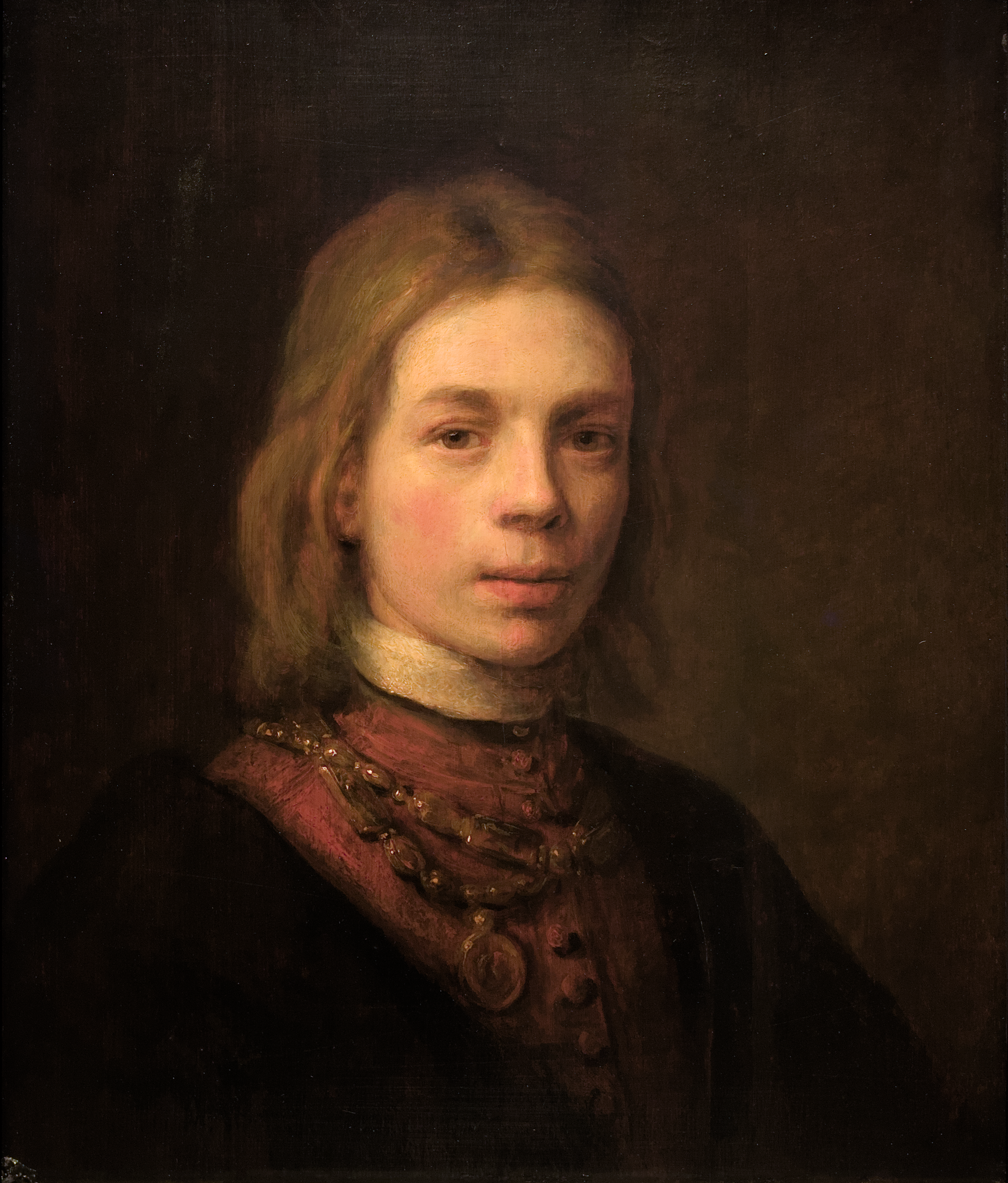
Self-Portrait, Panel, 54.1 x 44.8 cm, Die fürstlichen Sammlungen, Vaduz-Vienna,
