= Balen =

Balen may refer to:

== Places ==
- Balen, Belgium, a municipality in Belgium
- Saas-Balen, a municipality in Switzerland

== People ==
- Balen Shah (born 1990), prime minister of Nepal
- Hendrick van Balen (1574–1632), a Flemish artist
- Mathias Balen (1611–1691), a Dutch historian
- Matthijs Balen (1684–1766), a Dutch painter
- Viena Balen (born 1986) Croatian road cyclist

== Other ==
- Balen Report, a document examining the BBC's coverage of the Israeli-Palestinian conflict
