= An Old Woman Dozing =

Painting by Nicolaes Maes

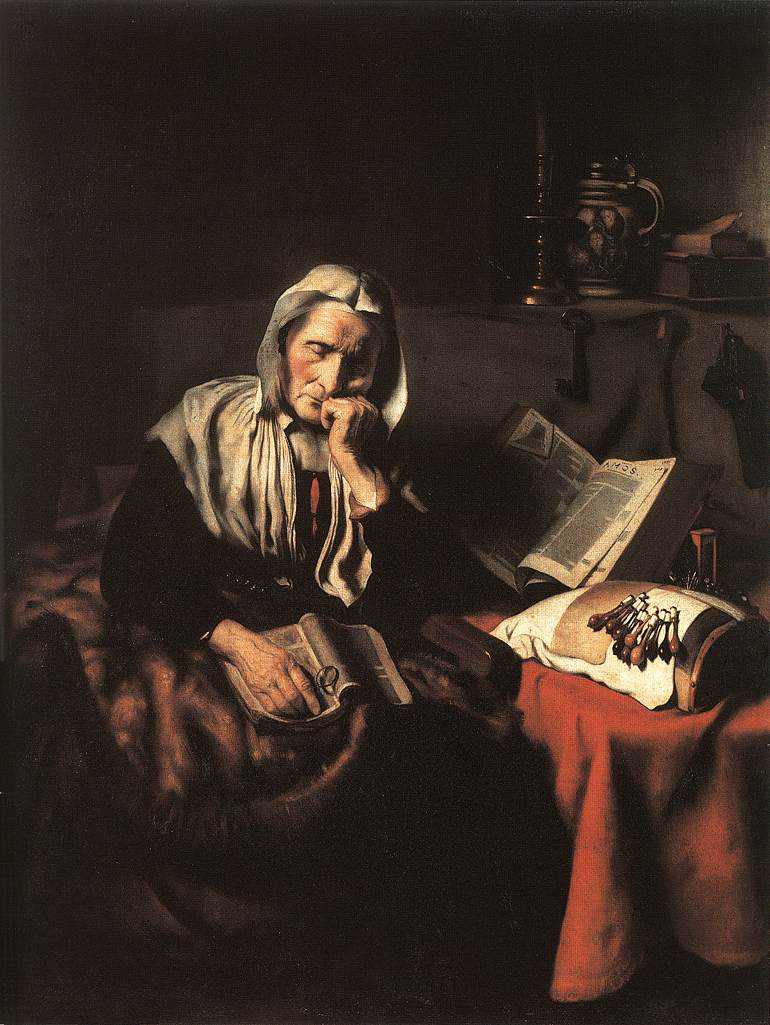
- Artist: Nicolaes Maes
- Year: c. 1656
- Dimensions: 135 cm (53 in) × 105 cm (41 in)
- Collection: Royal Museums of Fine Arts of Belgium
- Identifiers: RKDimages ID: 249834; Bildindex der Kunst und Architektur ID: 20040893

An Old Woman Dozing (circa 1656) is an oil on canvas painting by the Dutch painter Nicolaes Maes. It is an example of Dutch Golden Age painting and is part of the collection of the Royal Museums of Fine Arts of Belgium.

The woman is dozing over a book and on the table next to her is a lace pillow for bobbin lace. Lace pillows were a favorite subject by Maes, who painted them with their owners:

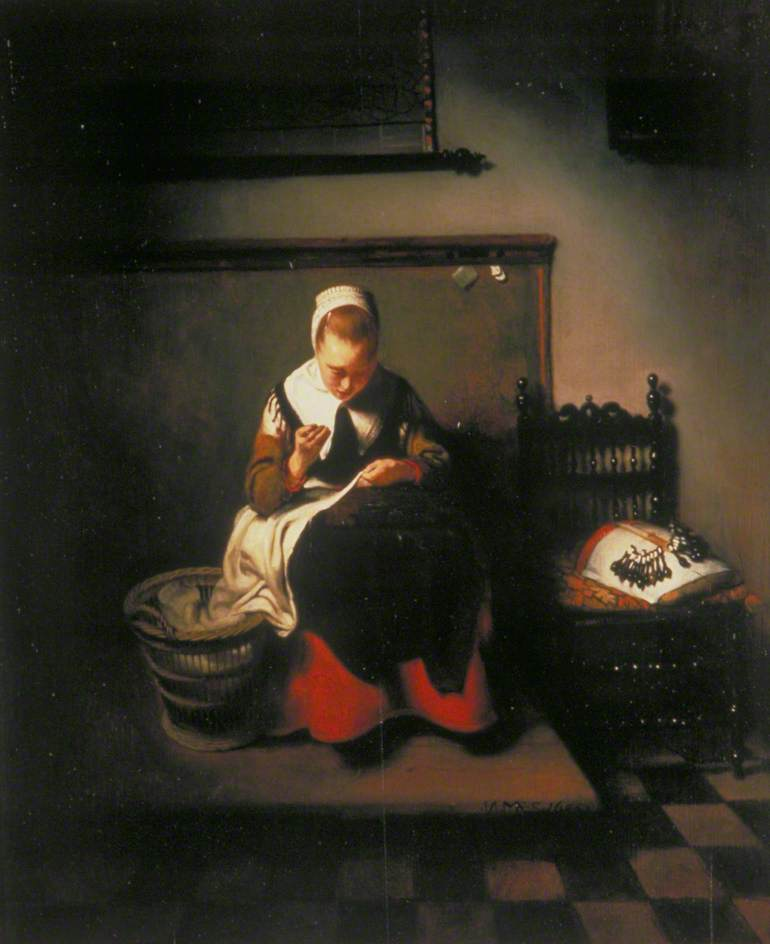
A Young Woman Sewing

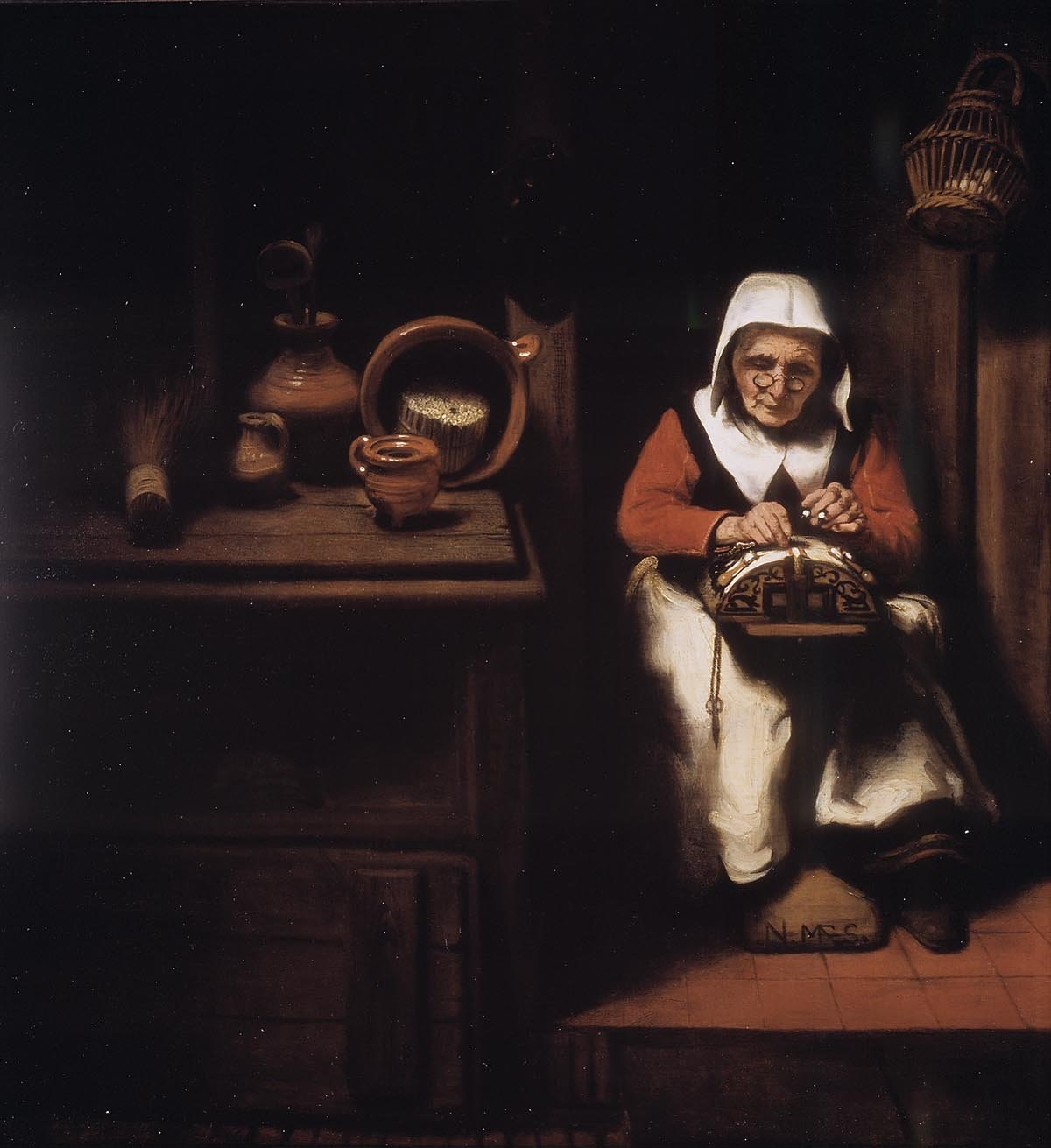
The Lacemaker

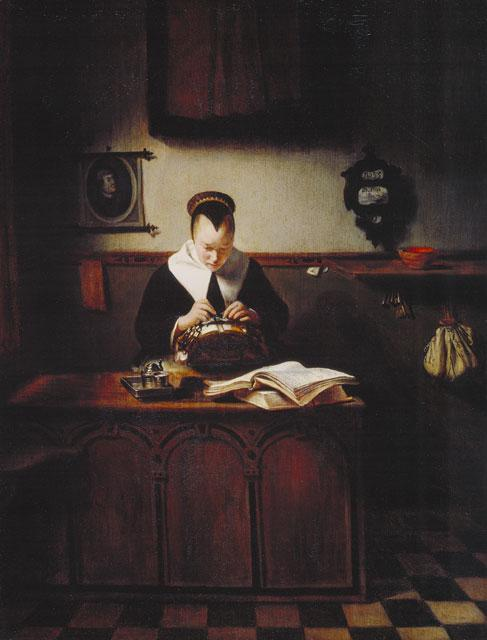
The Lacemaker

This painting was documented by Hofstede de Groot in 1914, who wrote; "99. AN OLD WOMAN DOZING OVER HER BOOK. She is in black with a white cap. She sits on a chair facing the spectator. Her spectacles are in her right hand, which rests on a Bible in her lap. Her head rests on her left hand; her elbow is on the table with a red cover beside her. On the table are a lace-pillow and a Bible open at the book of Amos. On a shelf on the wall are a jug and a candlestick with a candle in it. Canvas, 54 inches by 41 1/2 inches. Acquired from Gauchez, Paris, 1885, for the Museum (for 66,000 francs). In the Brussels Museum, 1908 catalogue, No. 279."
