= Bathing (painting) =

Painting attributed to Nicolaes Maes or Justus de Gelder

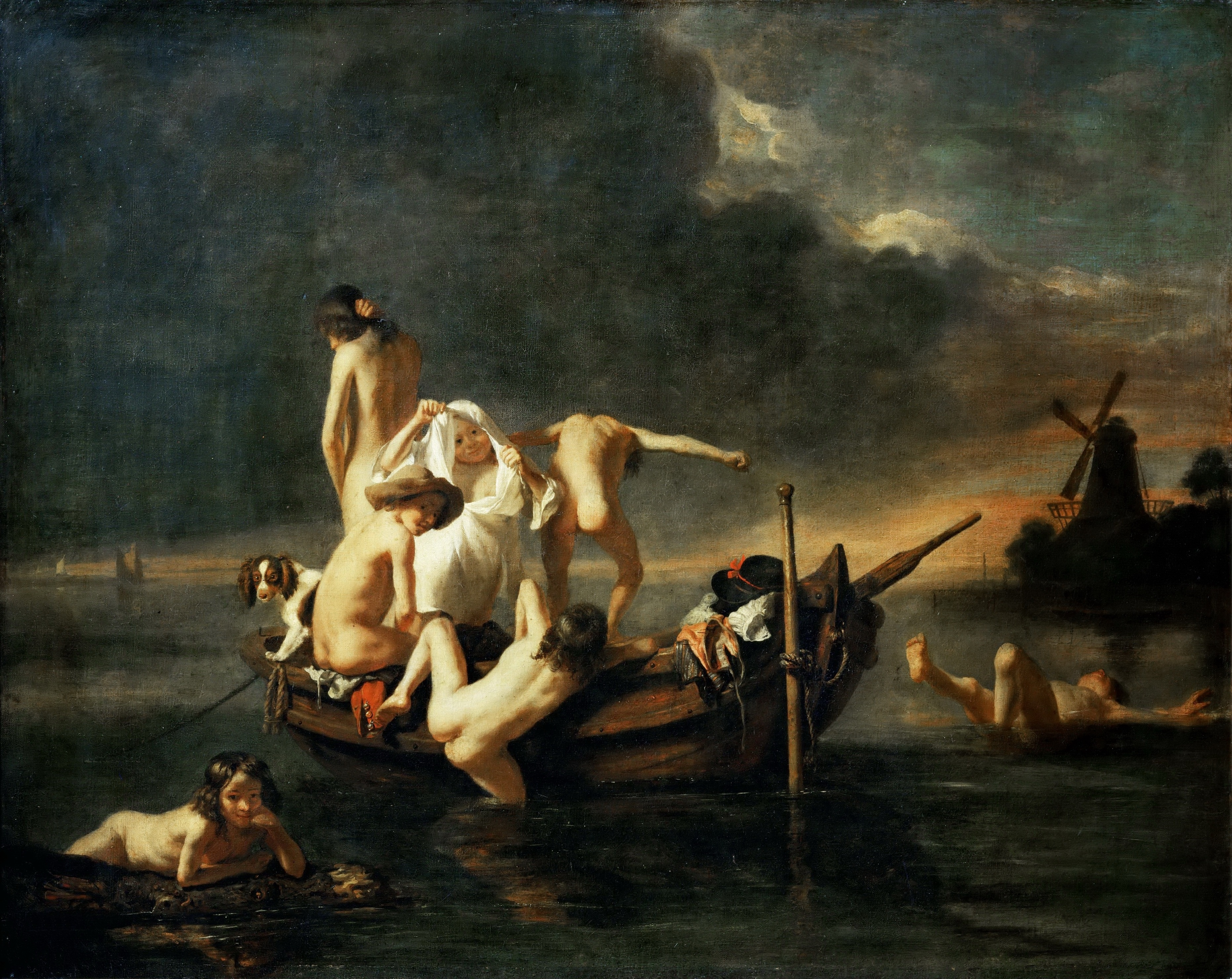
- Artist: Uncertain, it has been attributed to Nicolaes Maes, Justus de Gelder and others
- Medium: Oil on canvas
- Dimensions: 72.5 cm × 81.5 cm (28.5 in × 32.1 in)
- Location: Louvre, Paris

Bathing or Children Bathing is an oil-on-canvas painting in the collection of the Louvre Museum, which depicts landscape with children played naked on and around a boat on a body of water with a windmill in the distance. It is presumed to have been painted between 1655 and 1660. While the work was traditionally attributed to the Dutch painter Nicolaes Maes, this attribution has been regularly disputed.

== Attribution ==
The painting was acquired by the Louvre in 1914 from the collection of the estate of Baron Schlichting. At the time of its acquisition by the Louvre it was thought to be an early work by Nicolaes Maes. During the 1920s and 1930s many art historians raised doubts as to the attribution and suggested its style was closer to that of other artists, such as Jacob van Loo. Various alternative attributions have been proposed over the years including to François Verwilt, Gerbrand van den Eeckhout, Godfried Schalcken, Samuel Dirksz van Hoogstraten, Jan Vermeer, Cornelis Bisschop and Justus de Gelder. Justus de Gelder was a stepson of Maes and an amateur painter known for some genre paintings in the style of Maes executed in a less accomplished manner.

== Subject and meaning ==
While the painting appears to solely depict an idyllic genre scene of children having fun in and around a boat on the water, various elements point to an underlying moral lesson. The child leaning on a floating tree trunk points to the fragility of an existence built on uncertain foundations while the imprudent swimmer who has fallen into the water may symbolise the error of those who have relied too much on their own knowledge and neglected to call for help from others.
