= The Listening Housewife =

1655 painting by Nicolaes Maes

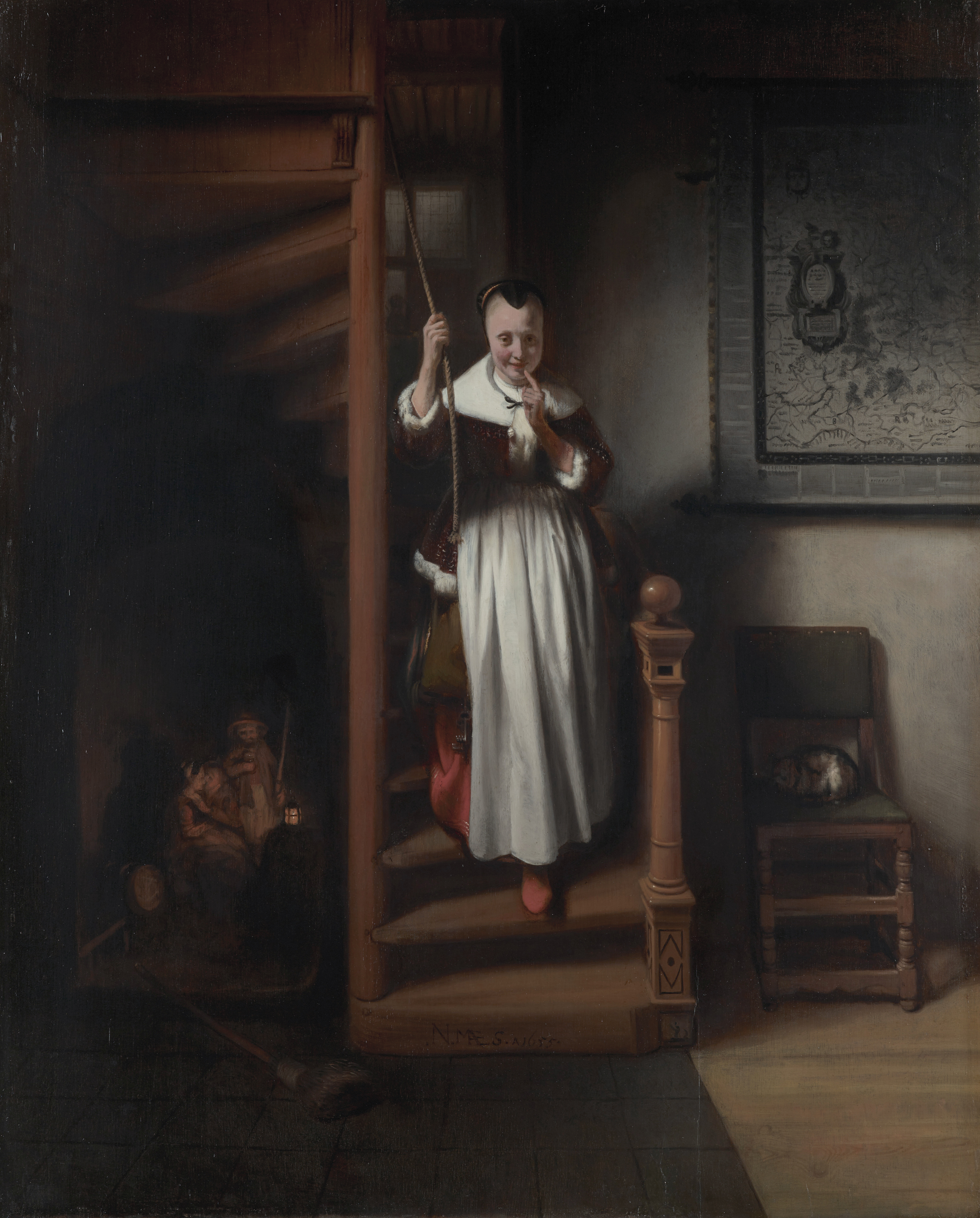
- Artist: Nicolaes Maes
- Year: 1655
- Medium: oil paint, panel
- Dimensions: 74.9 cm (29.5 in) × 60.4 cm (23.8 in)
- Location: Royal Collection
- Owner: George IV
- Accession no.: RCIN 405535
- Identifiers: RKDimages ID: 252249

The Listening Housewife (1655) is an oil on panel painting by the Dutch painter Nicolaes Maes. It is an example of Dutch Golden Age painting and is part of the collection of the Royal Collection of the United Kingdom.

This painting shows a woman as eavesdropper, a theme in interiors painted several times by Maes in the 1650s. There is a pair of lovers in the cellar that the woman is amused by, and her look directly at the viewer invites a collaborative peek at what they are doing. Another version of this painting, also painted by Maes, is on display in the Wallace Collection.

This painting was documented by Hofstede de Groot in 1914, who wrote; "123. A GIRL WITH TWO MEN IN A CELLAR, WITH A YOUNG WOMAN LISTENING. Sm. 7. The woman comes down a winding stair in the centre. She holds on to a rope with her right hand, and lays her left forefinger on her lips. She has a sly smile as she listens to the girl and the two men in the cellar below to the left; one of the men caresses the girl by the light of a lantern. To the right, near the stairs, is a chair with a cat on it. On the wall to the right is a map. Signed in full on the lowest step, and dated 1655 not 1665, as Sm. and Waagen wrongly state; panel, 29 inches by 23 inches.

A copy was in the sale: Brunswig and others, Cologne, July 3, 1899, No. 34; another is in the Wesendonck collection, lent to the Bonn Museum, 1914 catalogue, No. 127.
Engraved in the Le Brun Gallery.
Exhibited in the British Institution, London, 1822, No. 6, 1826, No. 138,

and 1827, No. 104; in the Royal Academy Winter Exhibition, London, 1877, No. 71, and 1892, No. 85. Sales. Dubois, Paris, 1782 (852 francs); see C. Blanc, ii. 65.

Hill, London, 1811 (£157 : 10s., Lord Yarmouth for the Prince Regent).

In the Royal collection, Buckingham Palace, London, 1885 catalogue, No. 45."
