= The Old Lacemaker =

Painting by Nicolaes Maes

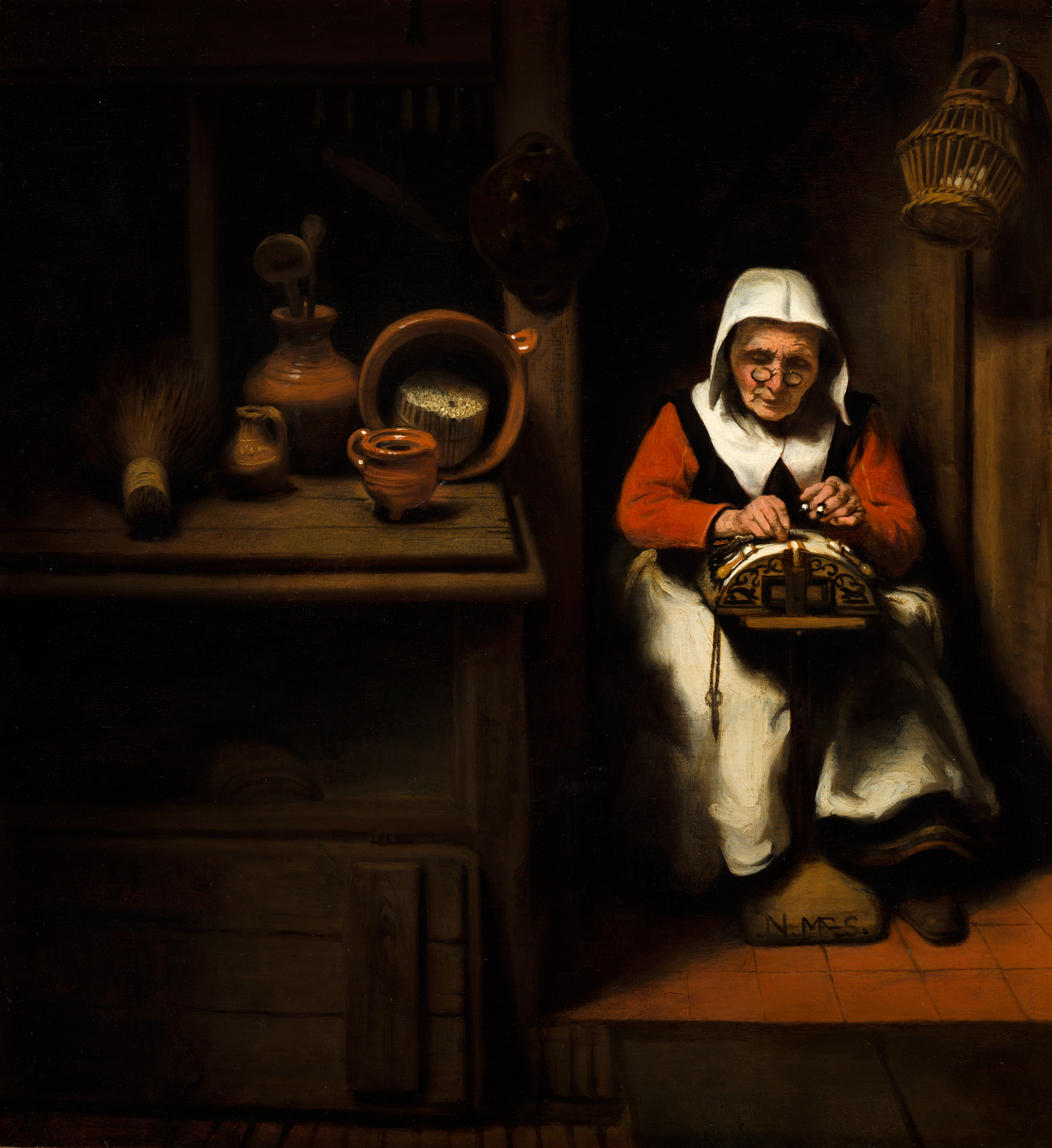
- Artist: Nicolaes Maes
- Year: 1655
- Medium: Oil paint, panel
- Dimensions: 38.8 cm (15.3 in) × 35.9 cm (14.1 in)
- Location: Mauritshuis
- Accession no.: 1101
- Identifiers: RKDimages ID: 10631

The Old Lacemaker (c. 1655) is an oil-on-panel painting by the Dutch painter Nicolaes Maes. It is an example of Dutch Golden Age painting and is part of the collection of the Mauritshuis.

The painting shows a woman making bobbin lace and the lace pillow she is using is the same in all the paintings Maes made of lacemakers:

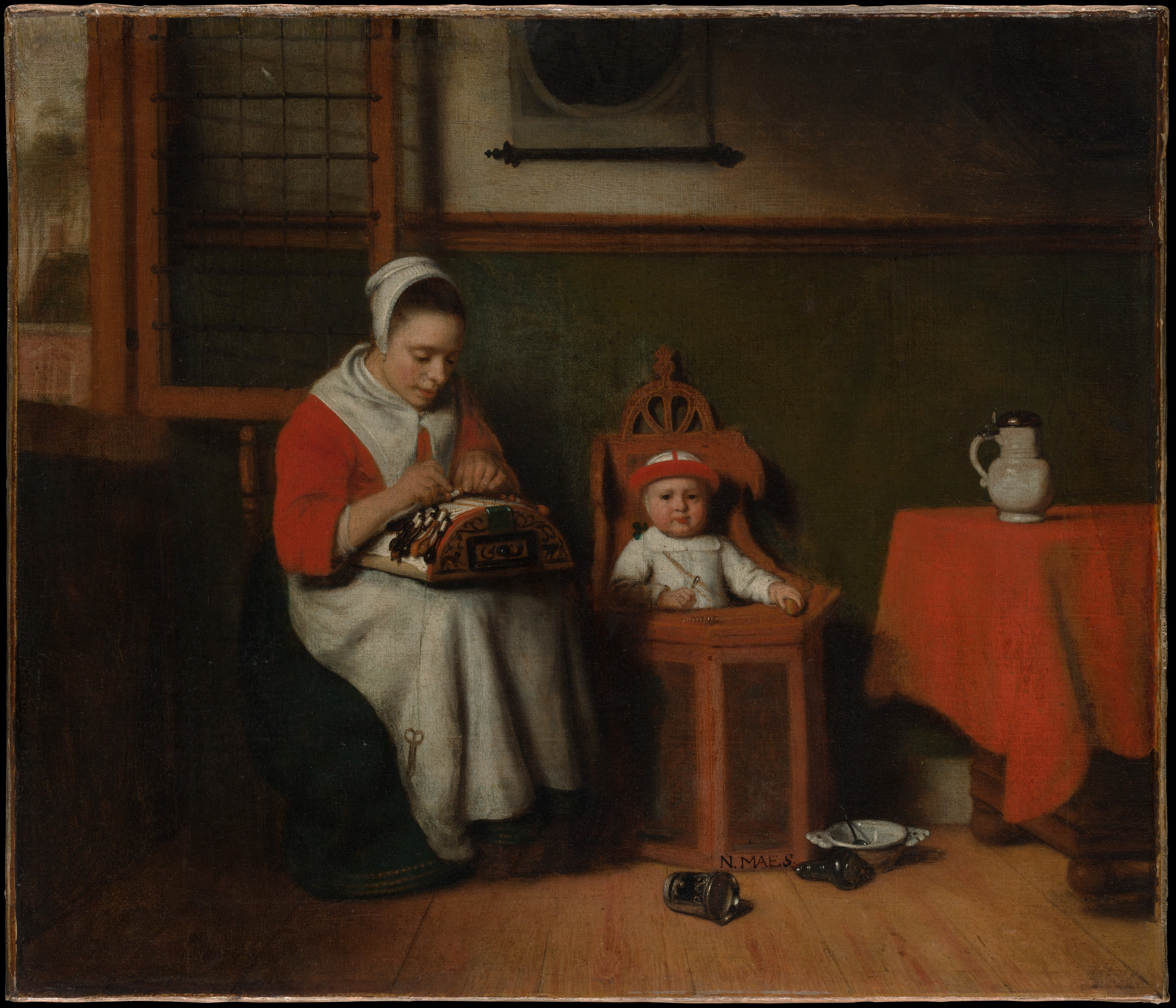
The Lacemaker, 1655

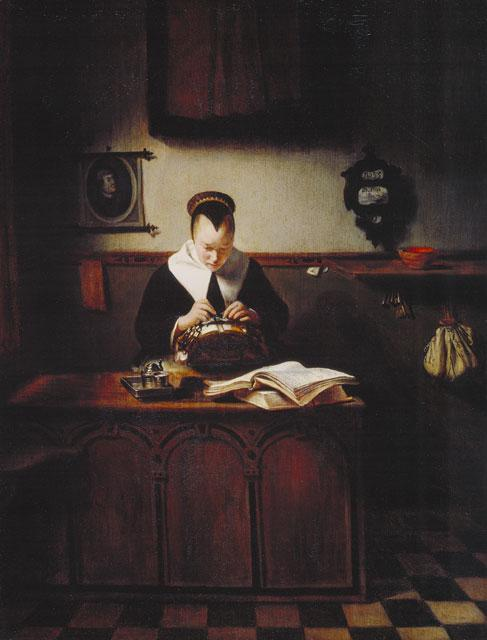
The Lacemaker, 1655

This painting was documented by Hofstede de Groot in 1914, who wrote; "71. An Old Lace-Maker. Sm. Suppl. 7. An old woman with spectacles, facing the spectator, sits making lace. She wears a black jacket with scarlet sleeves. Over her head hangs a basket of eggs. On a dresser at the side is some crockery. " A masterly production but a little darkened by time" (Sm.). Panel, 15 1/2 inches by 13 1/2 inches. Sale. London, 1836 (£69 : 6s.)."

The 1836 sale was at Christie's lot 60, and the buyer was Colemna. In 1994 it came on the market again and the museum was able to purchase it with support from VSB Fonds Den Haag, Vereniging Rembrandt, and Vrienden van het Mauritshuis.
