= Margaretha van Godewijk =

Dutch golden age artist (1627-1677)

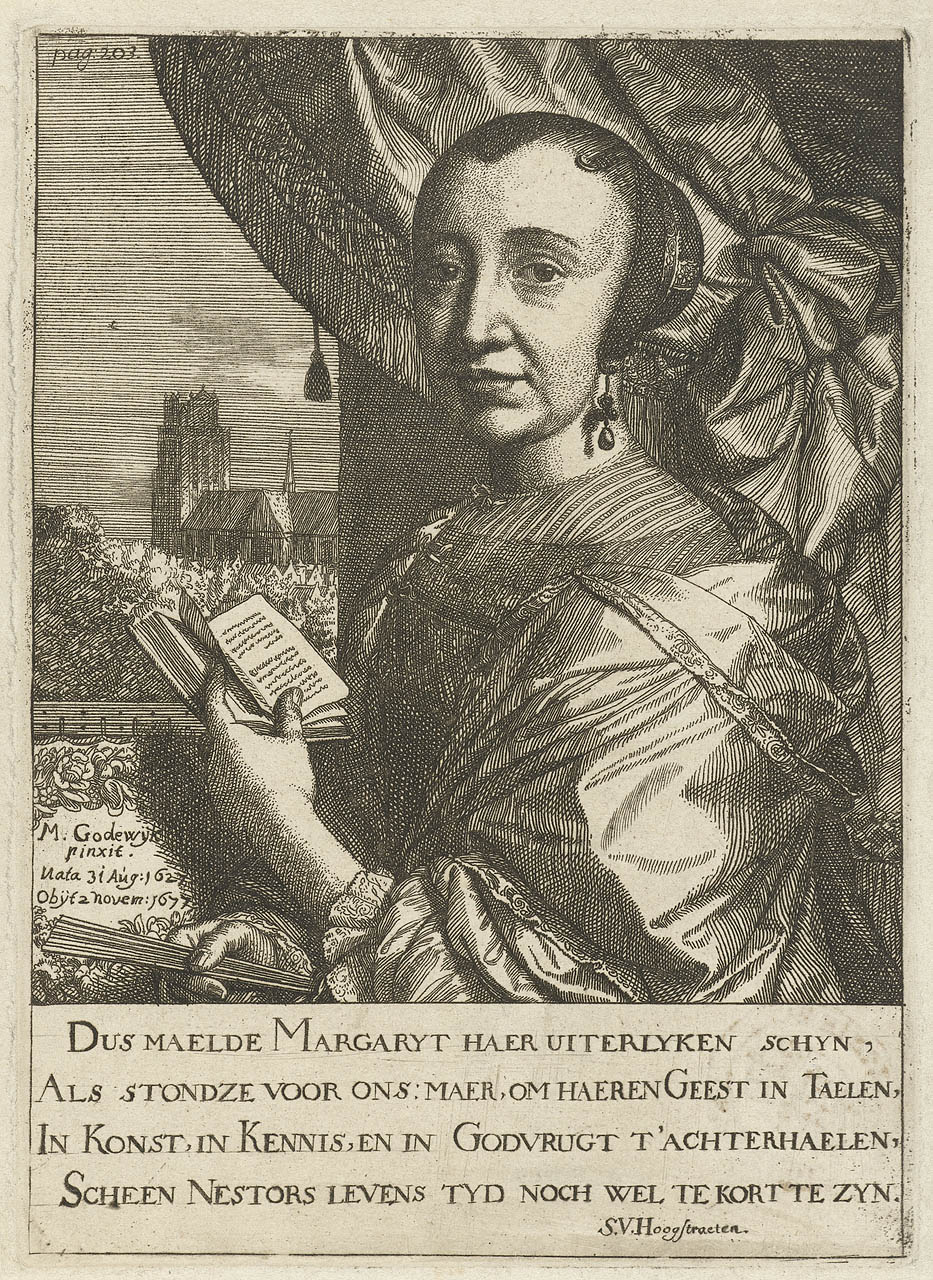
Margaretha van Godewijk, after a self-portrait

Margaretha van Godewijk (30 or 31 August 1627, Dordrecht – 2 November 1677, Dordrecht), was a Dutch Golden Age poet and painter.

== Biography ==
According to Houbraken her father was a teacher at the Latin school in Dordrecht who taught her Greek, Latin, Italian, French and English. She could understand Hebrew, and was clever at making rhymes. She learned to paint from Nicolaes Maes and was skilled at painting landscapes, villas, houses, flowers and all sorts of ships, in oils, watercolours, and embroidery. She was also good at astronomy and making diamond engravings on glass (roemers). Houbraken quoted the Dordrecht writer Mathias Balen (1611–1691), who published a history of Dordrecht that included various famous women.

According to the RKD she was a pupil of Cornelis Bisschop and became a flower painter, but no works survive.
