= Abraham Busschop =

Dutch painter

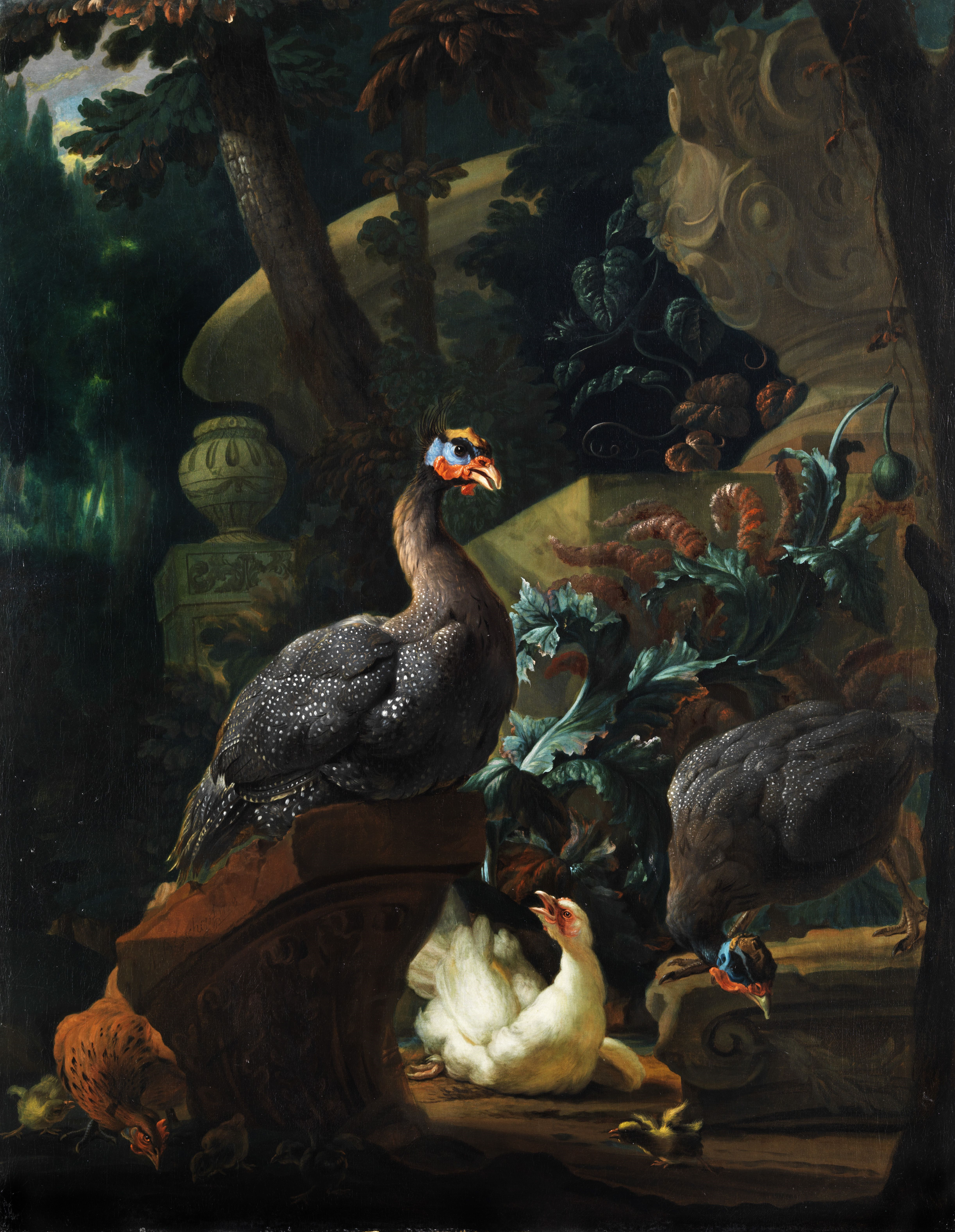
Park landscape with guinea fowl, chicken and chicks, 1723

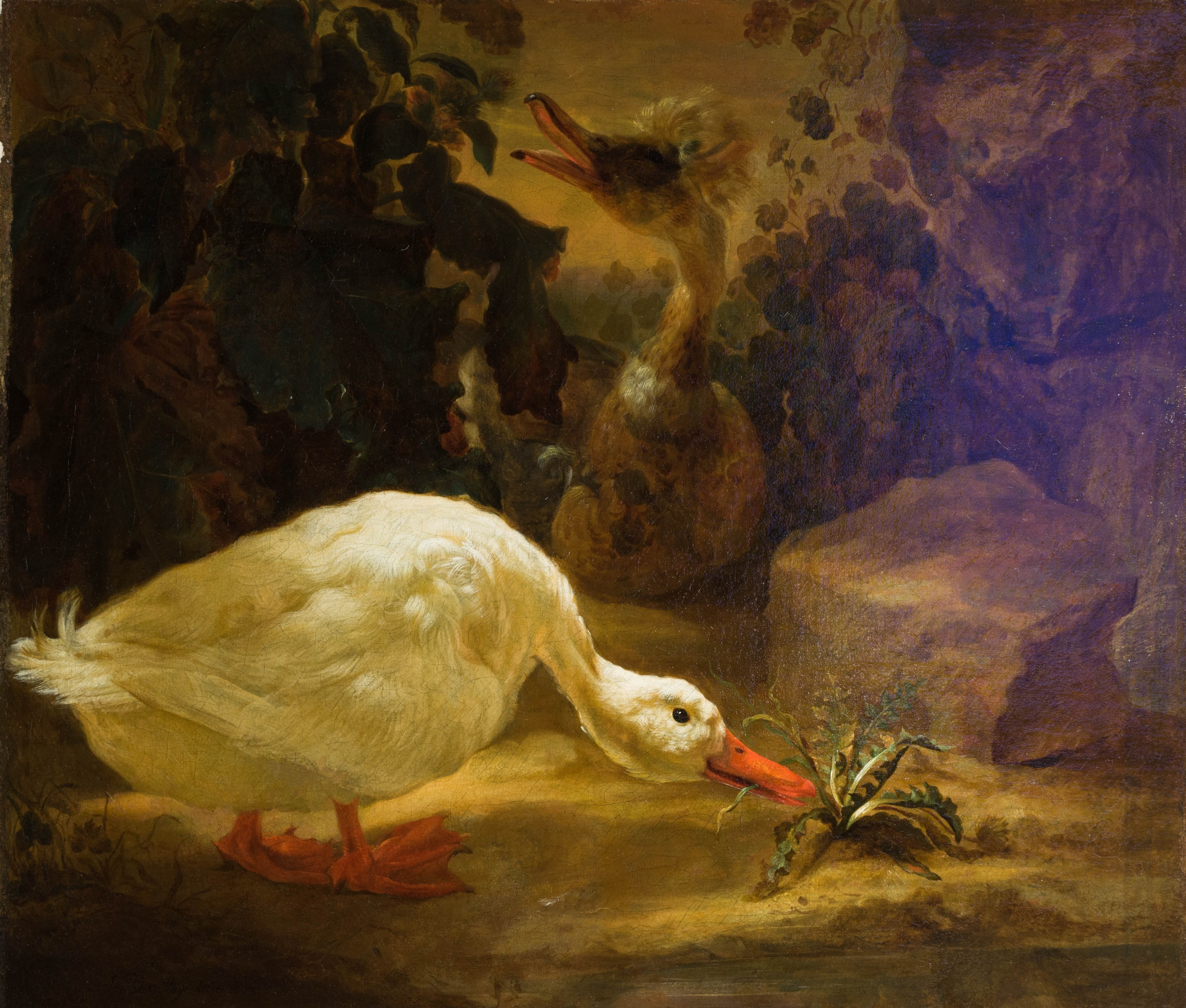
Ducks in a landscape, Abraham Busschop 1693

Abraham Busschop or Abraham Bisschop (1670, Dordrecht – 1729, Middelburg), was an 18th-century painter from the Dutch Republic.

== Biography ==
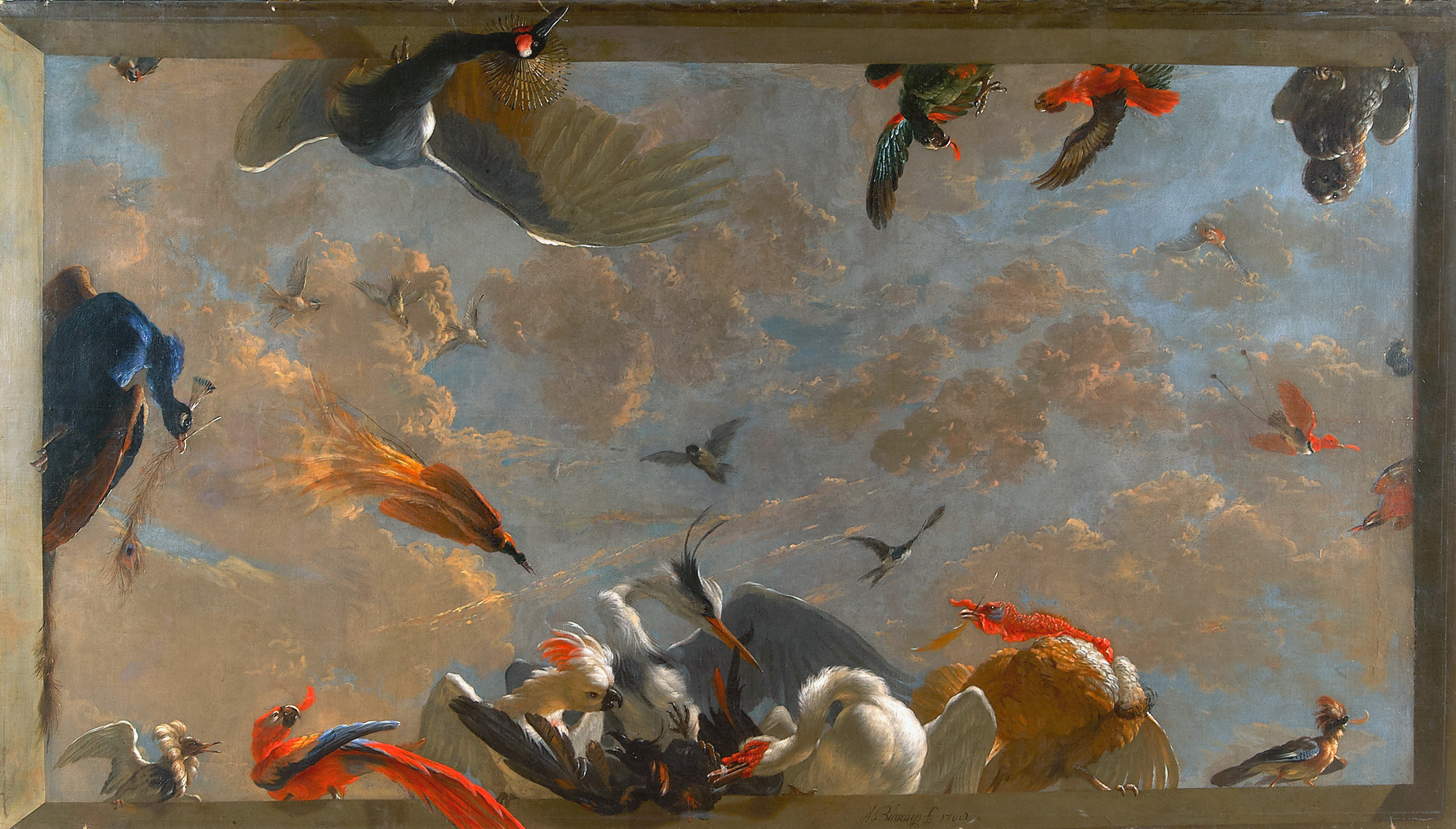
Ceiling piece with birds (1708)

According to Houbraken he was the son of the Cornelis Bisschop and the brother of Jacobus.

According to the RKD he became a member of the Middelburg Guild of St. Luke in 1715. He is known for still lifes and bird and animal pieces.

== Notes ==
- Ceiling piece in the Dordrecht Museum
- Abraham Busschop on Artnet
