= Jacobus Bisschop =

Dutch painter

Jacobus Bisschop (1658 – 1697) was an 18th-century painter from the Dutch Republic.

== Biography ==
He was born and died in Dordrecht. According to Houbraken when his younger brother Abraham no longer needed him, he left for the Hague to follow lessons from Augustinus Terwesten. After that he mostly made paintings for wall decorations in stately homes, at which pursuit he was quite successful.

According to the RKD he was the son of the genre painter Cornelis Bisschop and brother of the bird painter Abraham Busschop. He became Terwesten's pupil in 1686 at the Confrerie Pictura. He became a member of the Dordrecht Guild of St. Luke.
