= Portrait of a Lady (Maes) =

1677 painting by Nicolaes Maes

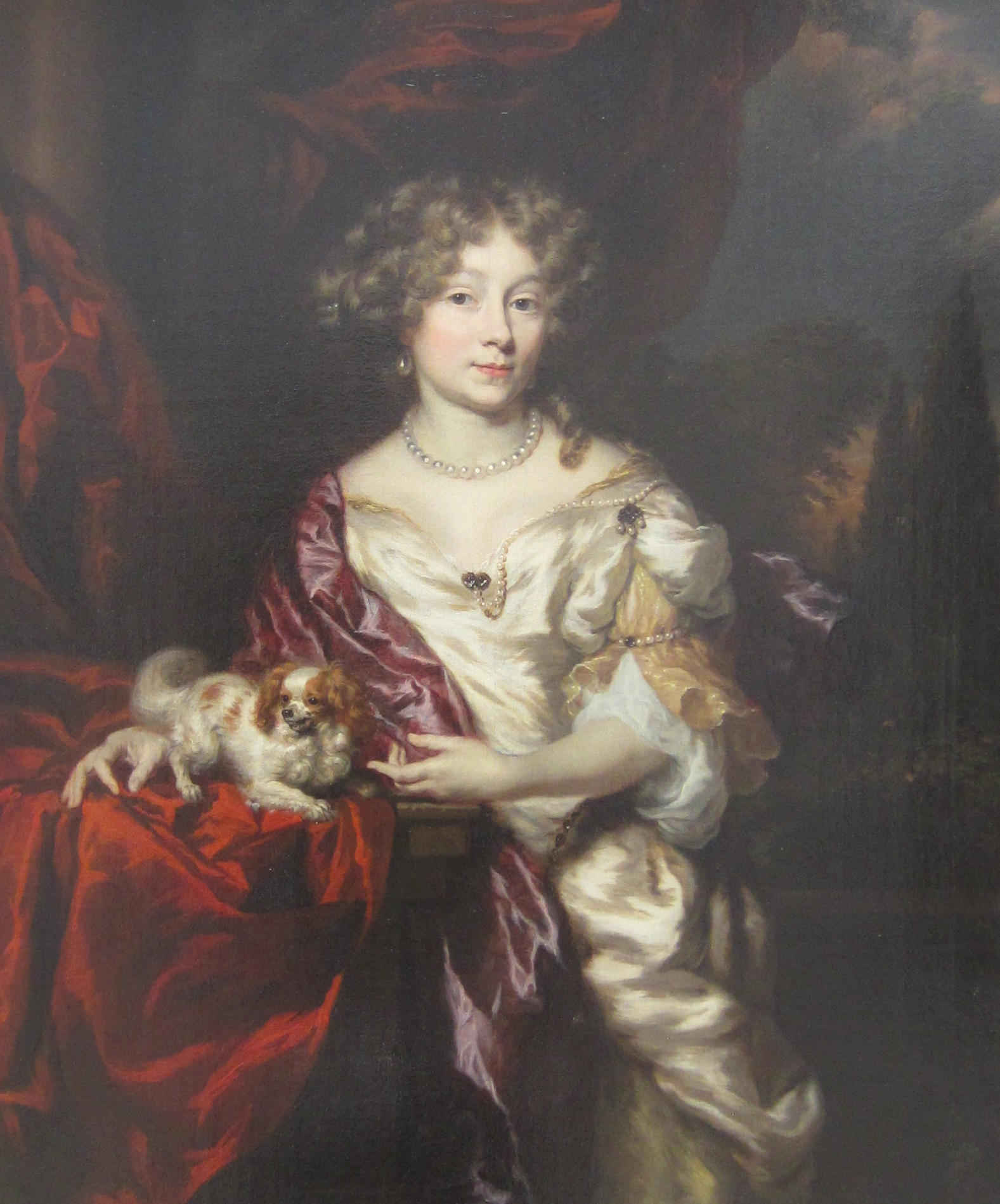
- Artist: Nicolaes Maes
- Year: 1677
- Dimensions: 67.6 cm × 56.5 cm (26.6 in × 22.2 in)
- Location: Timken Museum of Art, San Diego, California, U.S.

Portrait of a Lady is a 1677 oil painting on canvas by Nicolaes Maes, created in 1677. It is held at the Timken Museum of Art, in San Diego.
