= Jacob Moelaert =

Dutch Golden Age painter and art collector

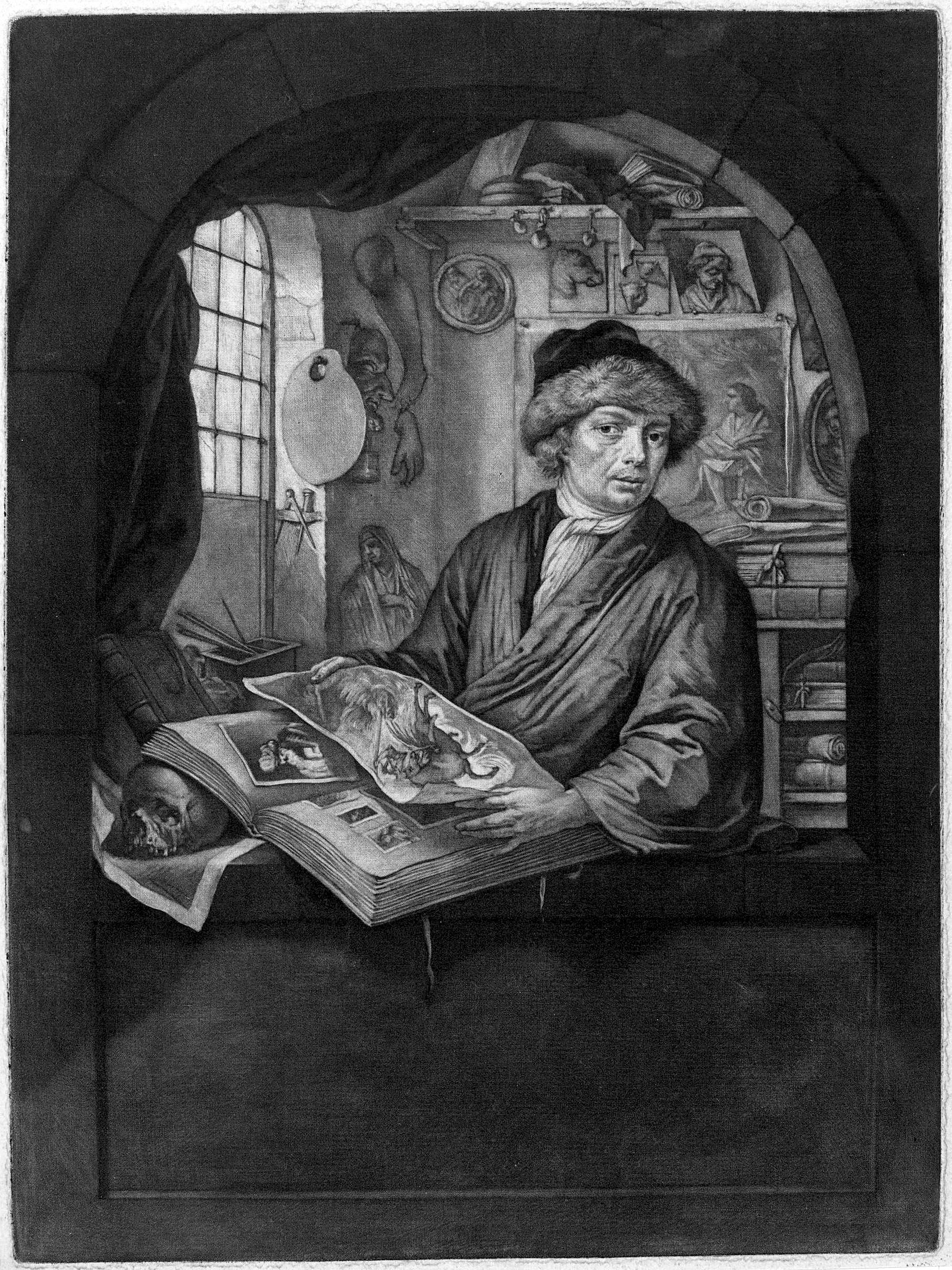
Jacob Moelaert (Nicolaas Verkolje)

Jacob Moelart or Moelaert (1649–1732) was a Dutch Golden Age painter and art collector.

== Biography ==
He was born and died in Dordrecht. According to Houbraken he was a pupil of Nicolaes Maes and learned how to paint a good portrait, but was better at history paintings.

According to the RKD he is known for his art collection as well as his paintings.
