= Cornelis Bisschop =

Dutch Golden Age painter

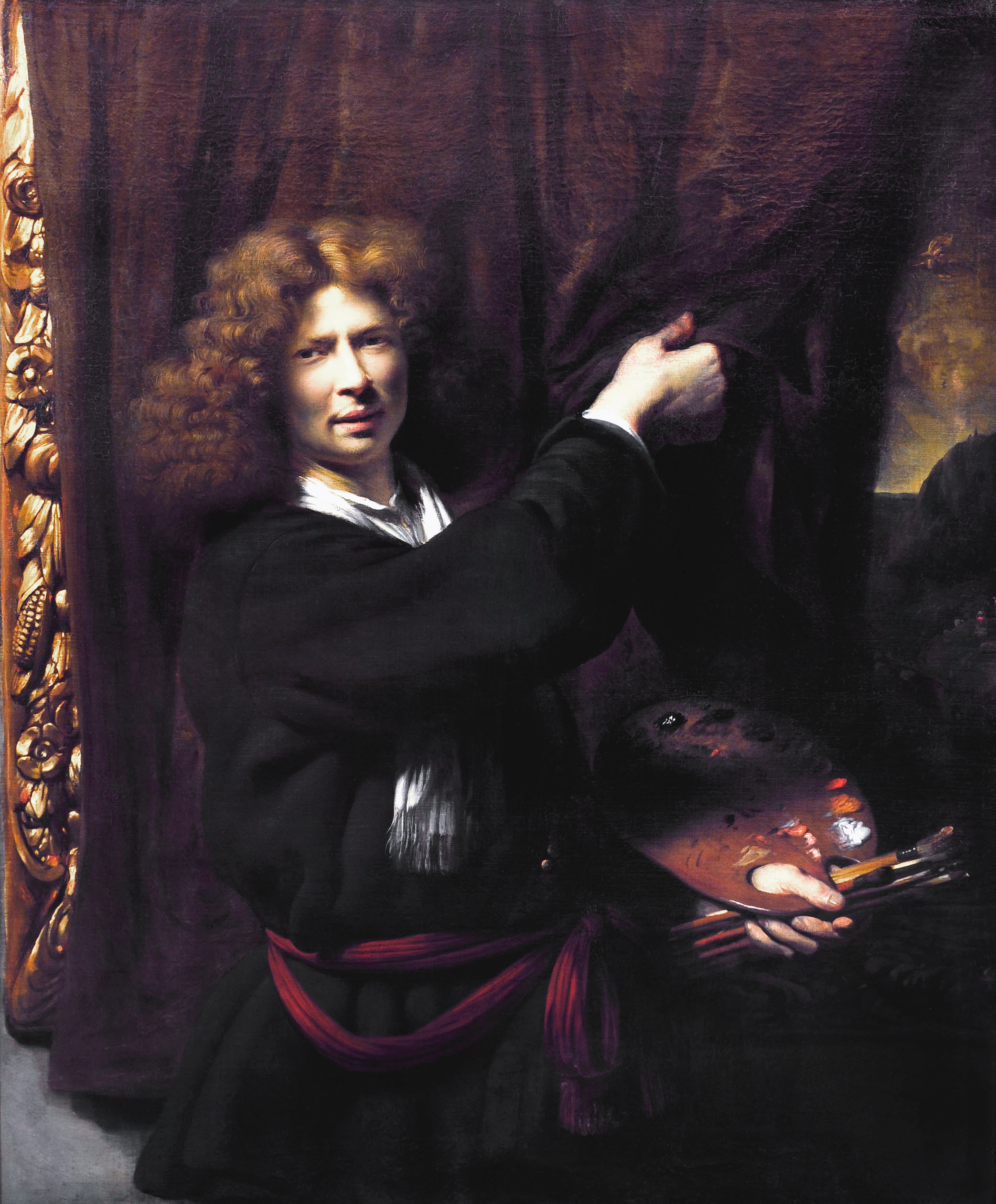
- Self-portrait
- Born: Cornelis Bisschop; 12 February 1630; Dordrecht
- Died: 21 January 1674 (aged 43); Dordrecht
- Known for: Painting
- Movement: Baroque

Cornelis Bisschop (12 February 1630 – 21 January 1674) was a Dutch Golden Age painter.

== Biography ==
He was born in Dordrecht. In ca. 1650 he was a student of Ferdinand Bol in Amsterdam. In 1653 he was back in Dordrecht, where he got married. According to Houbraken he was the first to paint carved trompe-l'œil wooden panels in such an ingenious way that they became quite popular. He painted historical allegories, portraits, still lifes, and genre-works. He was asked to paint for the Danish court, but he died unexpectedly, leaving his wife and eleven children.

Of these children, two sons Abraham and Jacobus and three daughters became painters. These had been his students along with Margaretha van Godewijk who wrote an emblem about his self-portrait with a curtain, which illustrates the legend of Zeuxis.

Cornelis Bisschop

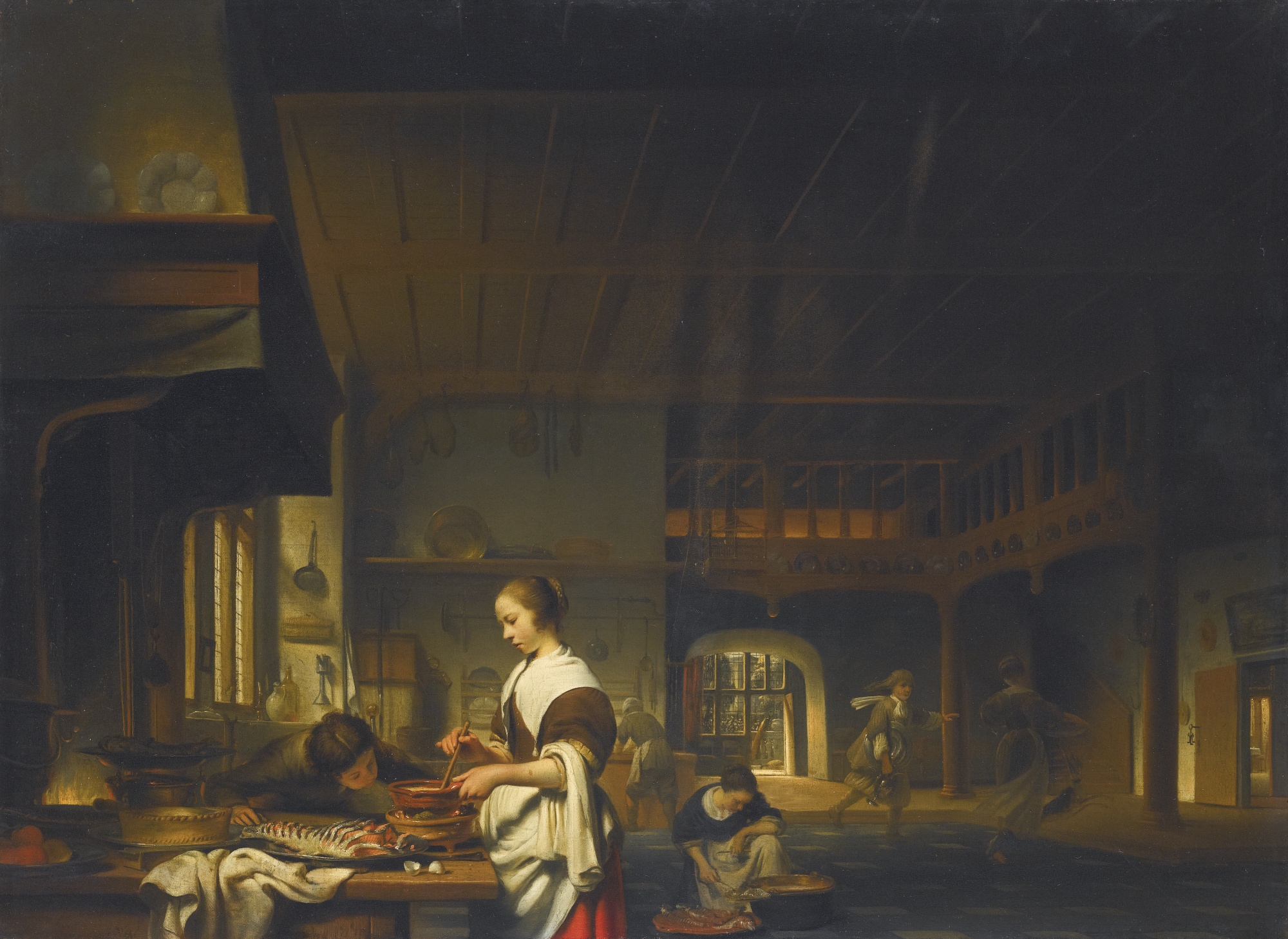
Kitchen interior with a woman cooking and a boy blowing flames

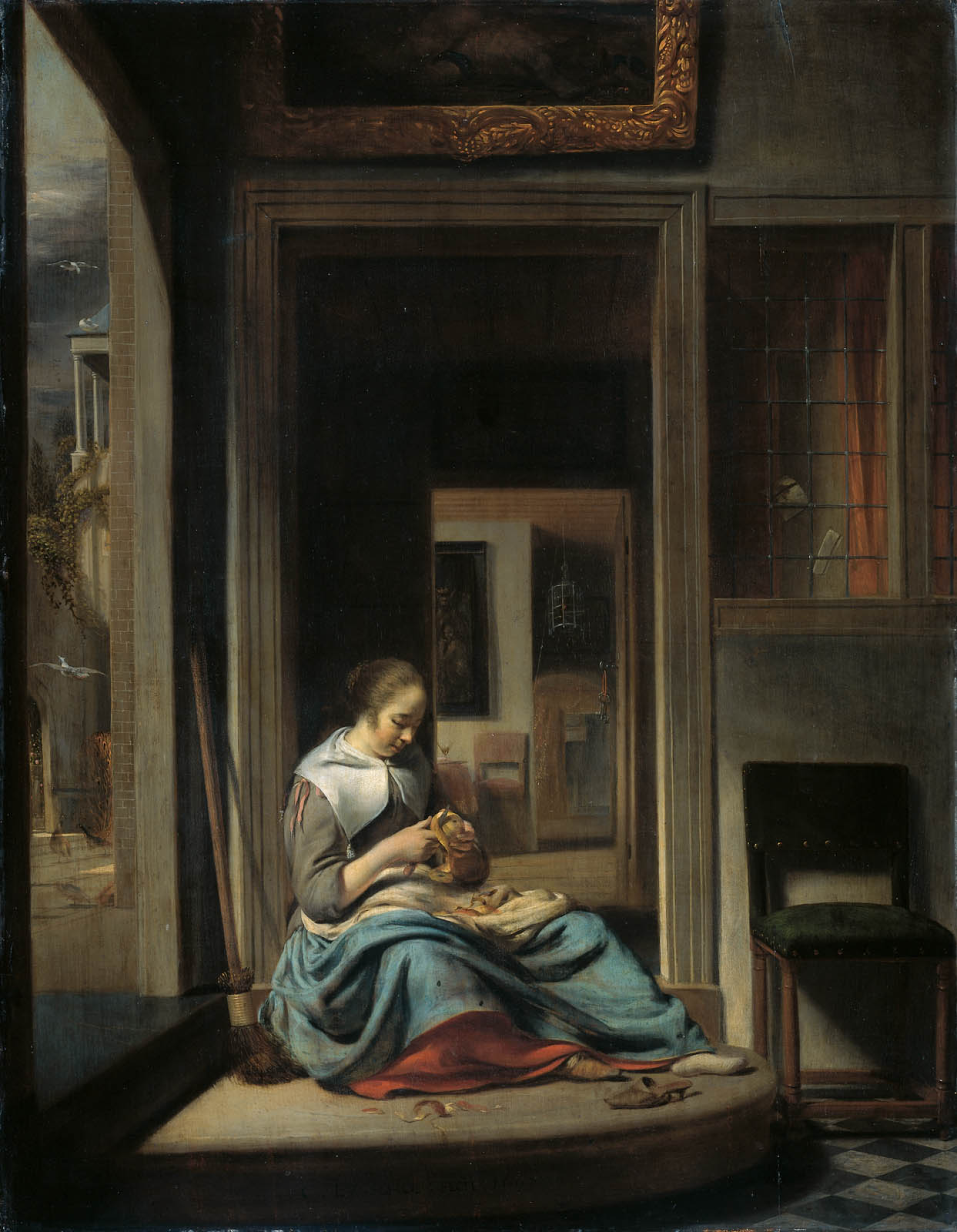
Girl peeling an apple 1667

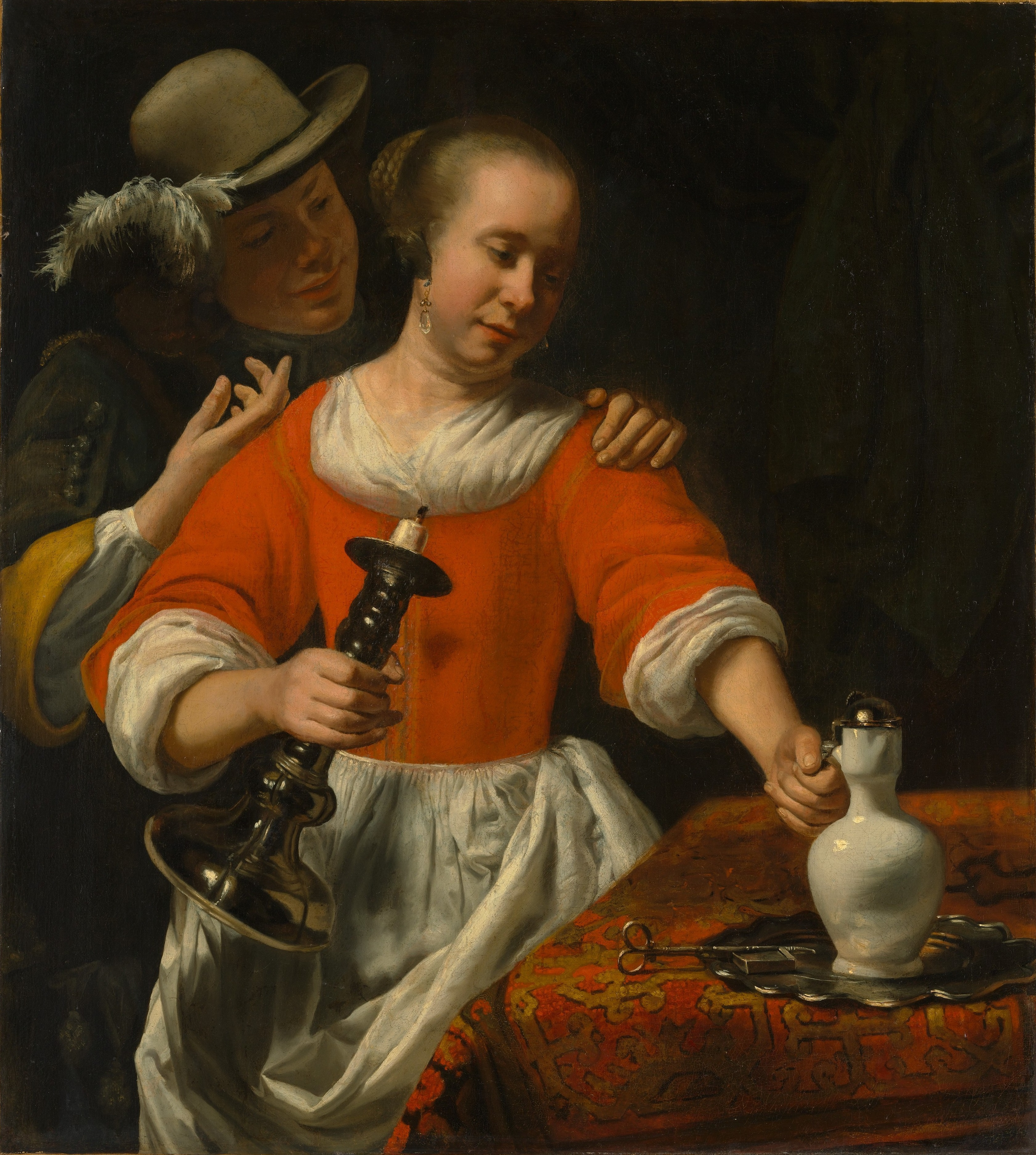
A Young Woman and a Cavalier

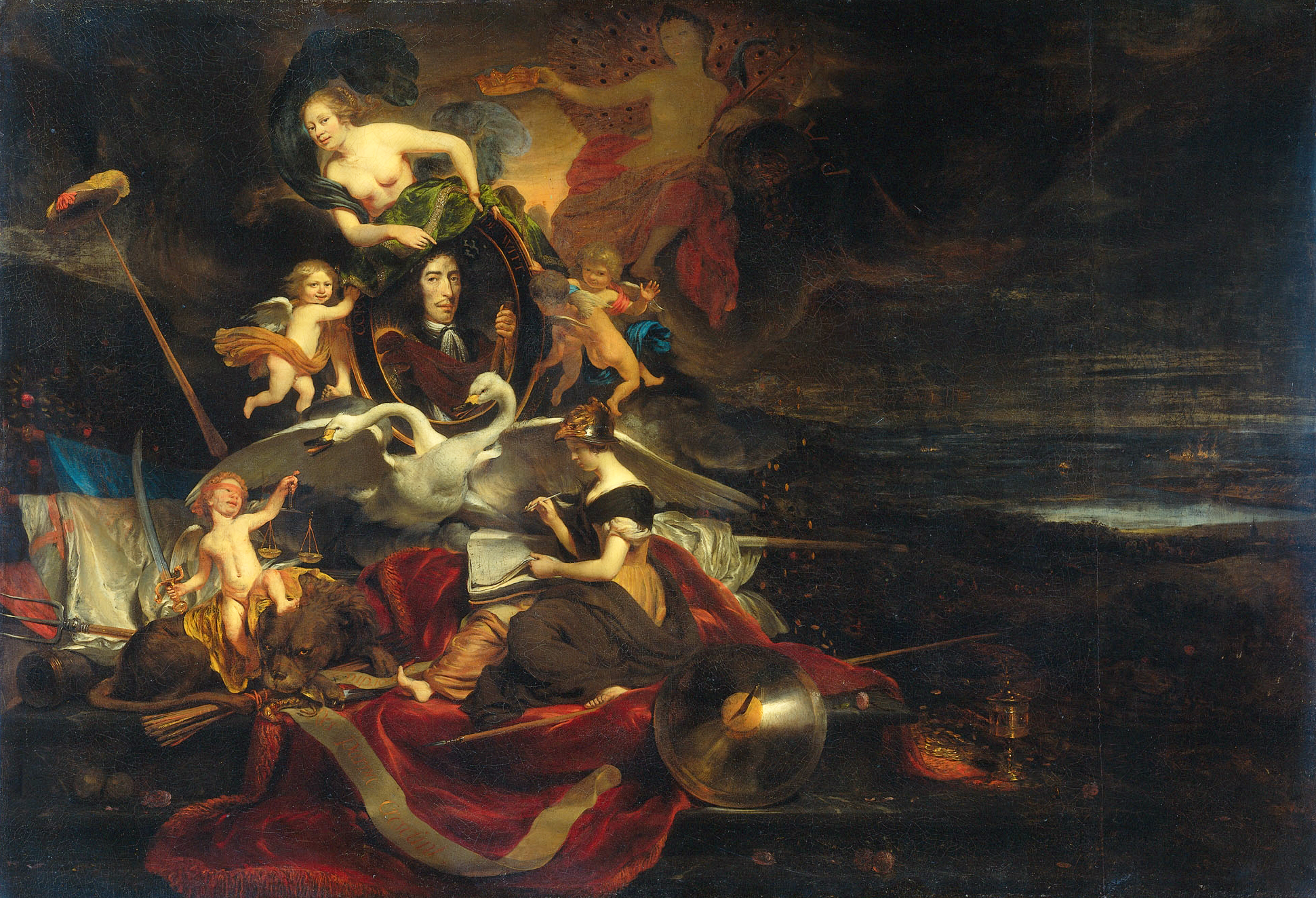
Allegory on the Raid on the Medway
