= The Lacemaker (Maes) =

Painting by Nicolaes Maes

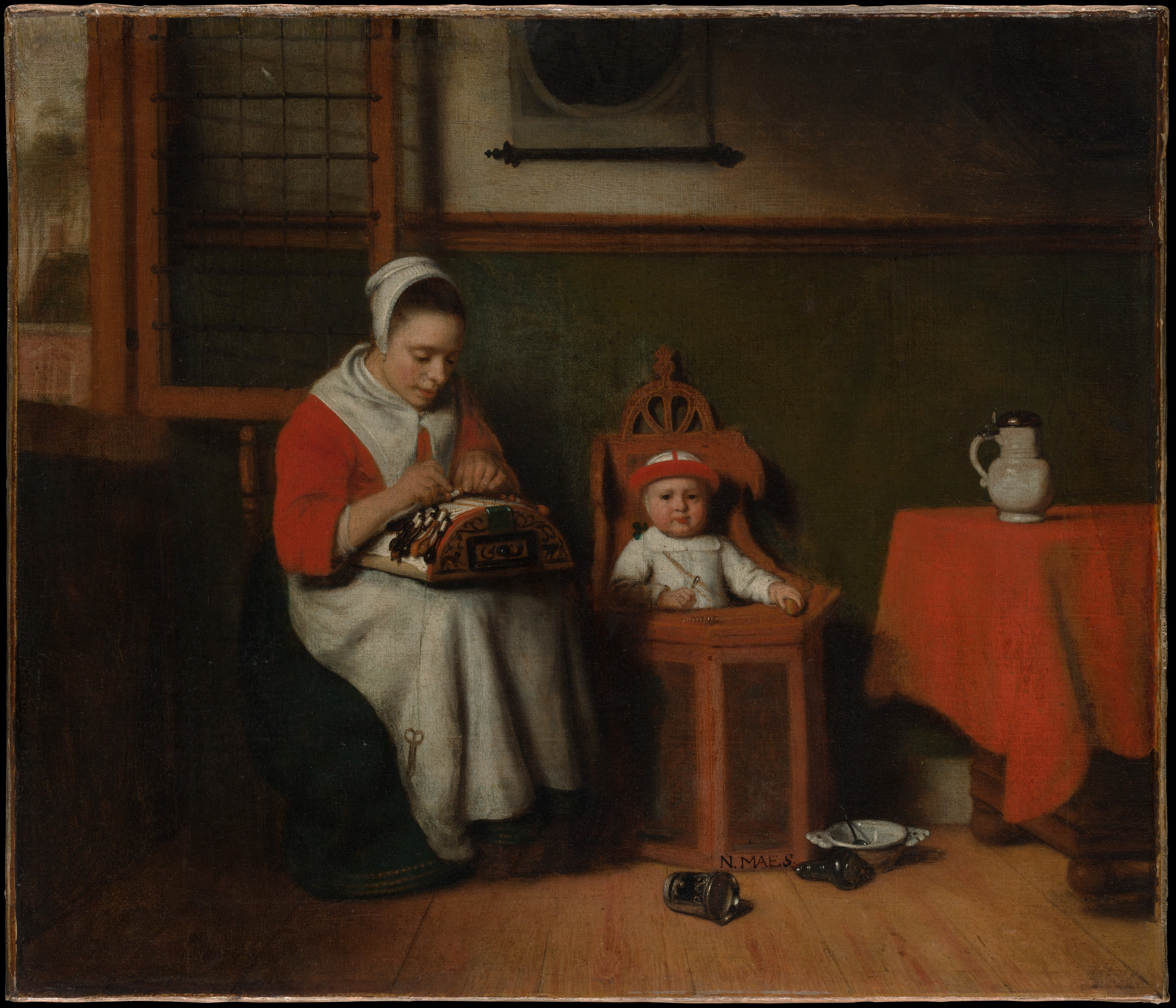
- Artist: Nicolaes Maes
- Year: c. 1656
- Medium: oil paint, canvas
- Dimensions: 45 cm (18 in) × 53 cm (21 in)
- Location: Metropolitan Museum of Art
- Accession no.: 32.100.5
- Identifiers: RKDimages ID: 249877; The Met object ID: 436932

The Lacemaker is an oil on canvas painting by the Dutch painter Nicolaes Maes, created c. 1656. It is an example of Dutch Golden Age painting and is part of the collection of the Metropolitan Museum of Art, in New York.

This painting is typical of many paintings of women in interiors painted by Maes in the time. The woman is making bobbin lace using a lace pillow that can be seen in other Maes paintings of lacemakers:

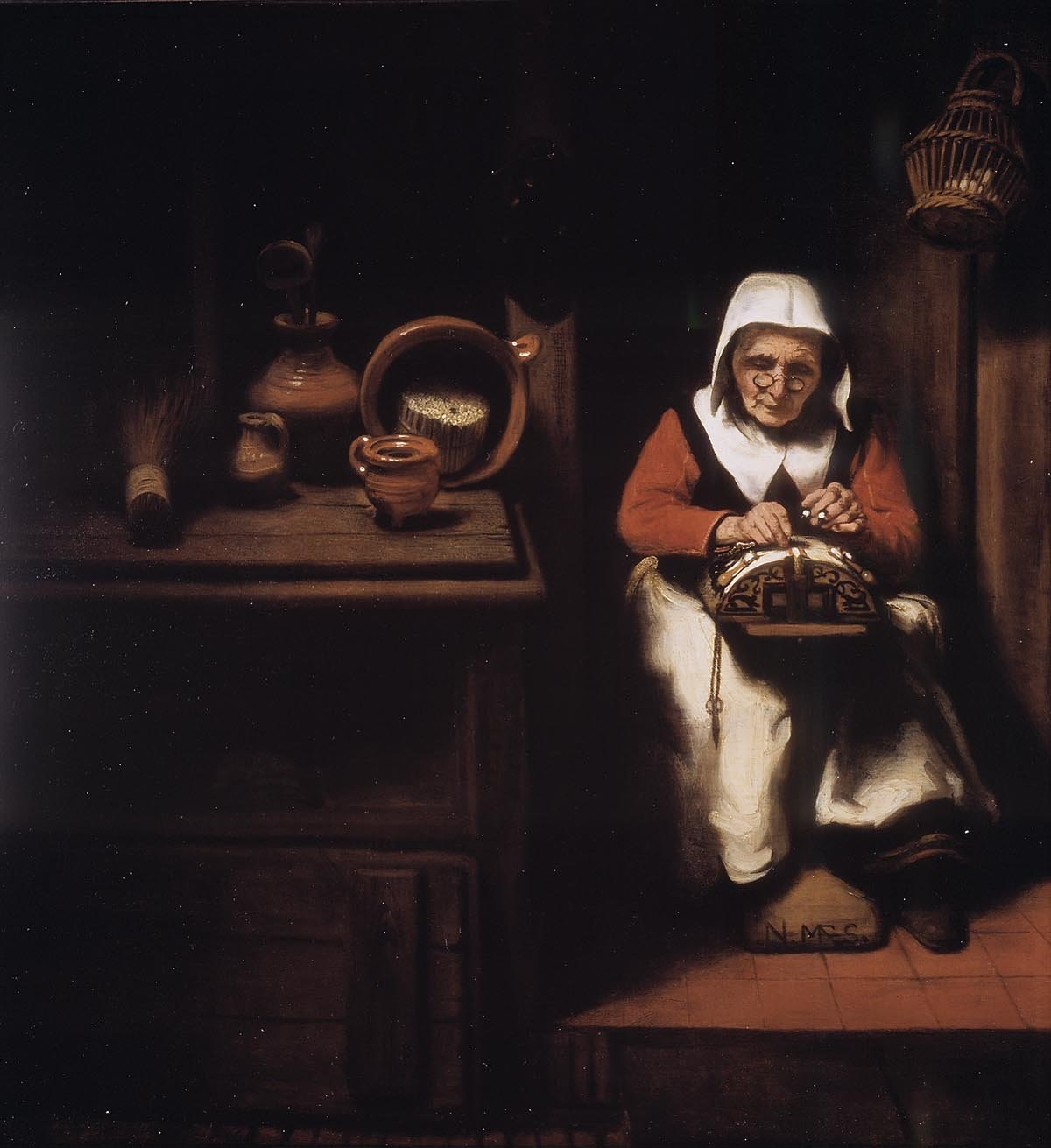
The Old Lacemaker, circa 1655

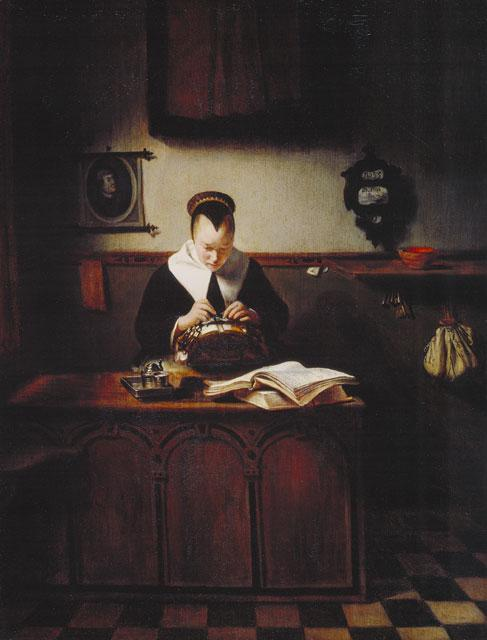
The Lacemaker, 1655

The child in a highchair was a popular subject for many Dutch genre painters, and this painting shows how it was used as a safe place to play as well as for eating. The empty bowl of porridge is on the floor along with some other items the boy has let fall. He is wearing a red valhoed or falling cap, which seems to indicate that confinement in the chair is necessary if any lacemaking is going to get done. Some other 17th-century examples of paintings of children with their high chairs:

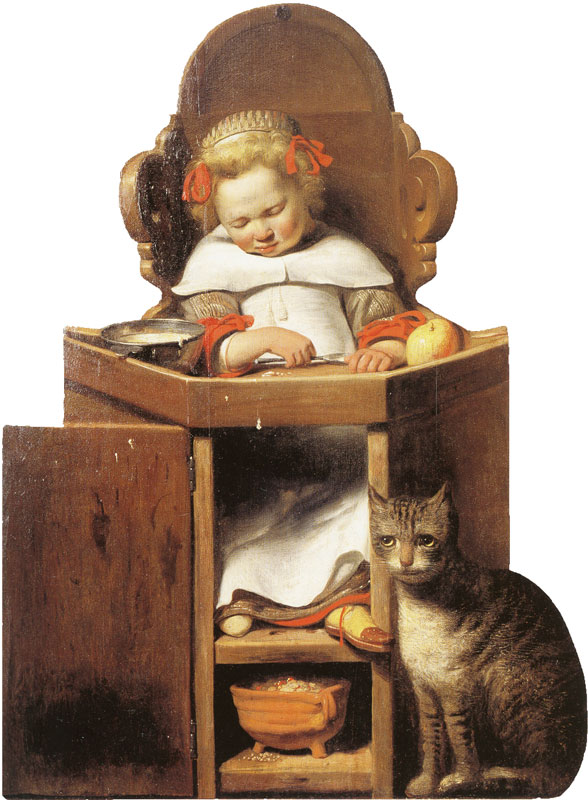
Boy Sleeping in a High Chair, 1654, by Johannes Verspronck

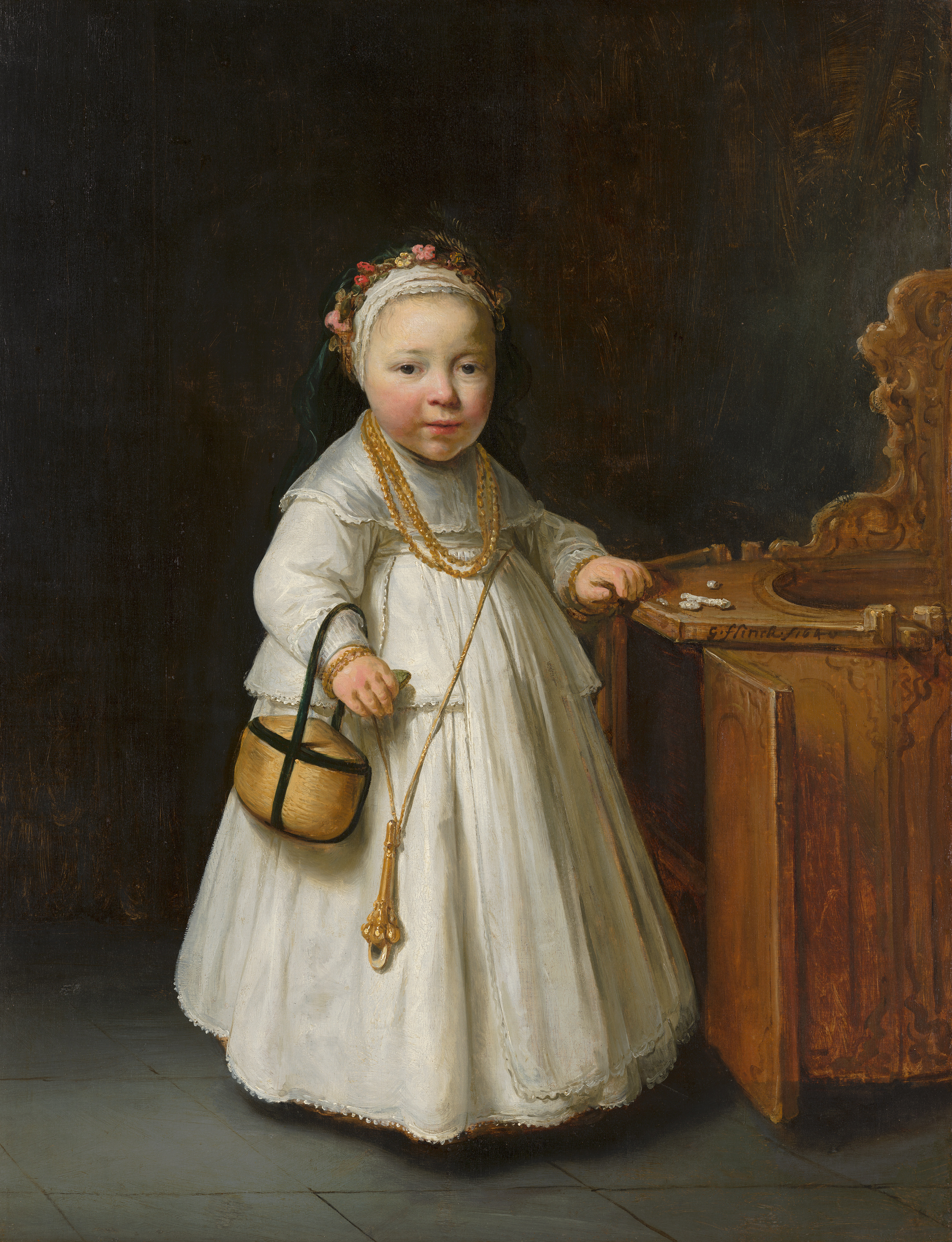
Girl with her High Chair, 1640, by Govert Flinck

This painting was documented by Hofstede de Groot in 1914, who wrote; "75. A Young Lace-Maker. Sm. Suppl. 13. She wears a red dress and white apron, and sits at a window which lights the room. Beside her, her little child, in a yellow frock, plays in a wooden chair. To the right is a table with a red cover, on which is an earthenware pot. Signed in full in large antique letters; canvas, 17 1/2 inches by 20 inches according to Sm. and Waagen, but 33 1/2 inches by 30 1/2 inches according to the Manchester Catalogue. Exhibited in Manchester, 1857, No. 1050. In the collection of H. Labouchere, London, 1842 (Sm.) and 1854 (Waagen, ii. 421)."

In 1916 Labouchere's heir sold it for $25,000 to F. Kleinberger who in turn sold it on for $27,500 to Michael Friedsam. Friedsam bequeathed it to the museum in 1931.
