= Matthijs Balen =

Dutch painter

Matthijs Balen (1684–1766) was an 18th-century painter from the Dutch Republic.

According to the RKD he was a registered pupil of Arnold Houbraken, and like him, became a printmaker as well as a painter. He was born and died in Dordrecht. He lived in The Hague from 1705 to 1715 and is known for Italianate landscapes, portraits, and historical allegories.

He was probably the son or grandson of the Dordrecht writer Mathias Balen, who wrote Beschryvinge der stad Dordrecht in 1677. Houbraken himself had been a pupil of Samuel van Hoogstraten and was friends with Romeyn de Hooghe, both of whom assisted the elder Balen with some poems and etchings for his book.
