= Mathias Balen =

Dutch historian

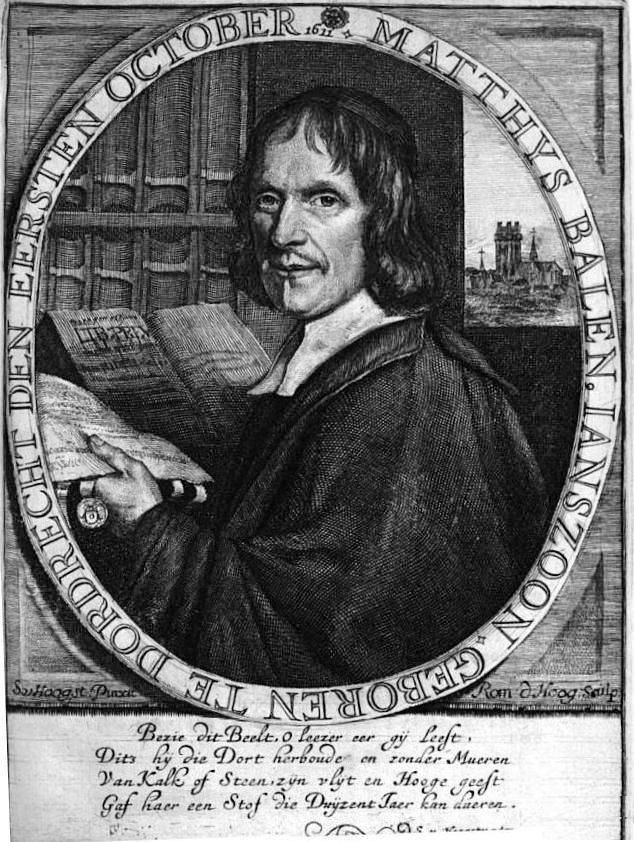
Portrait of Matthys Balen from his book, by Romeyn de Hooghe after Samuel van Hoogstraten

Mathias or Matthijs Jansz. Balen (born 1 October 1611 in Dordrecht; died 1691) was a Dutch historian.

== Biography ==
He first distinguished himself as a poet, but afterwards applied himself to historical researches, and in 1677 published a description of Dordrecht in two volumes, which is full of valuable matter. He died shortly after its publication. In his book, he lists most of the regents of the various guilds and other organizations in the town, including local painters and poets, among them Margaretha van Godewijk, who wrote a poem for his book. In his book he also lists important paintings in the city hall and other city structures by painters such as Anthonie van Montfoort, Jacob Gerritsz. Cuyp, and others

He was probably the father or grandfather of Matthijs Balen, who became a registered pupil of Arnold Houbraken.
