= Nicolaes Maes =

Dutch painter (1634–1693)

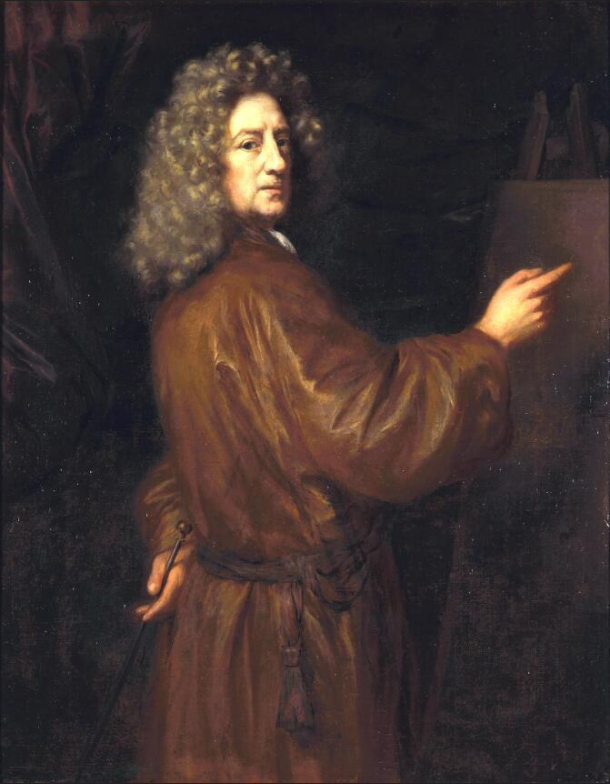
- Self-portrait, c. 1685
- Born: January 1634; Dordrecht, Dutch Republic
- Died: December 1693 (aged 58-59); Amsterdam, Dutch Republic
- Education: Rembrandt
- Known for: genre scenes, portraits, religious compositions
- Spouse: Adriana Brouwers

Nicolaes Maes (January 1634 – December 1693; buried 24 December 1693) was a Dutch painter known for his genre scenes, portraits, religious compositions and the occasional still life. A pupil of Rembrandt in Amsterdam, he returned to work in his native city of Dordrecht for 20 years. In the latter part of his career he returned to Amsterdam where he became the leading portrait painter of his time. Maes contributed to the development of genre painting in the Netherlands, and was the most prominent portrait painter working in Amsterdam in the final three decades of the 17th century.

== Life ==
Nicolaes Maes was born in Dordrecht as the second son of Gerrit Maes, a prosperous cloth merchant and soap boiler, and Ida Herman Claesdr.

He initially trained with a mediocre painter in his hometown. Around 1648, he went to Amsterdam, where he entered Rembrandt's studio. He remained in the studio of Rembrandt for about five years. He had returned to Dordrecht by December 1653. Here he is recorded making marriage arrangements as he posted on 28 December 1653 the bans of his marriage with Adriana Brouwers, the widow of the preacher Arnoldus de Gelder.

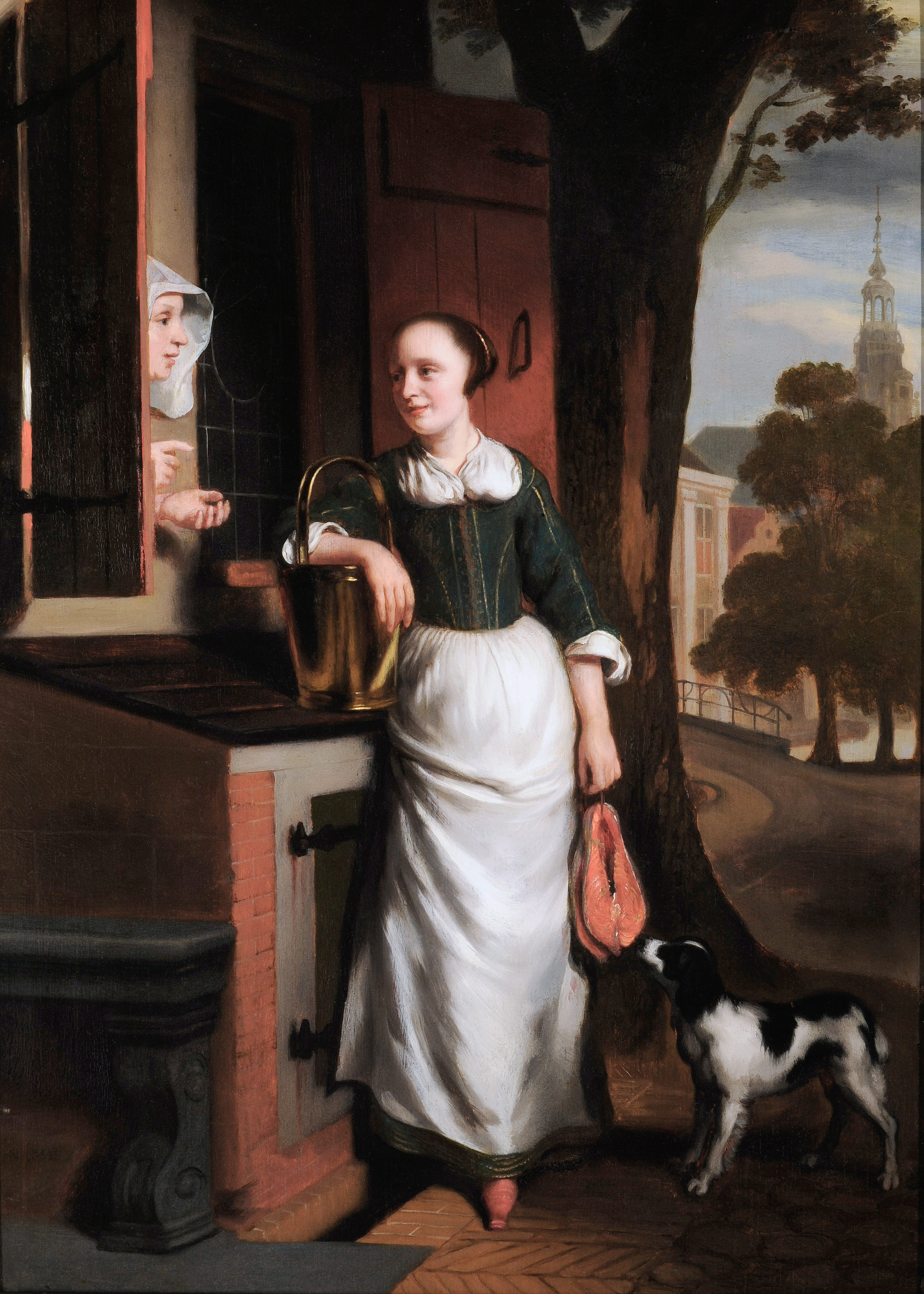
Two chattering housewives

A signed and dated picture of 1653 shows that the artist had established himself as an independent artist by that year.

In the middle or end of the 1650s, Maes travelled to Antwerp where he studied the work of Flemish artists such as Peter Paul Rubens, Anthony van Dyck and Jacob Jordaens. During his stay in Antwerp Maes is said to have paid a visit to Jordaens's studio and conversed with the artist at length about painting. From the 1660s, he dedicated himself almost exclusively to portrait painting. He continued to live and work in Dordrecht until 1673. He was clearly successful as attested by the fact that he paid municipal taxes on capital of 3,000 and 4,000 guilders. His high social status is demonstrated by his membership of the local civic guard, in which he reached the rank of lieutenant.

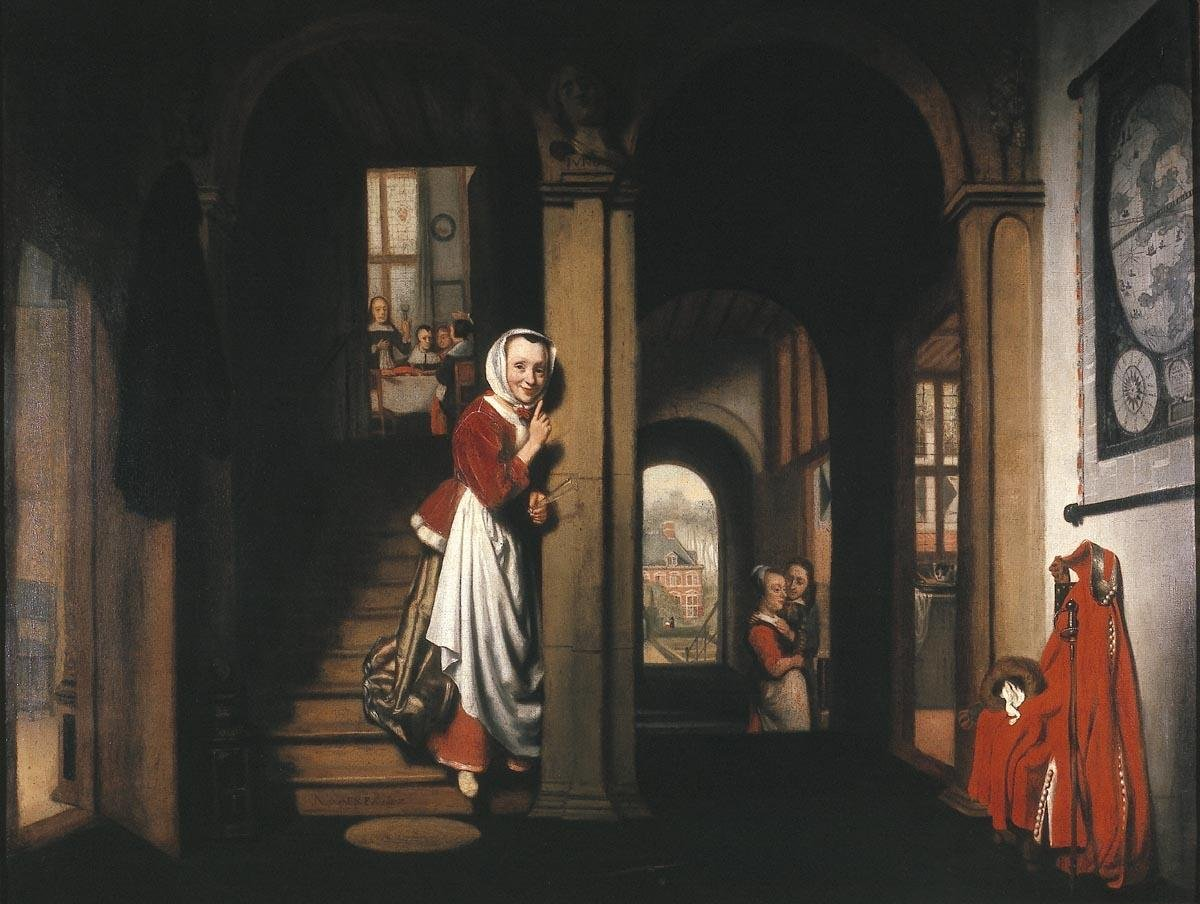
The eavesdropper

Maes moved to Amsterdam in 1673, where he resided until his death. The move was likely related to the ready market for portrait specialists after the death of the leading Amsterdam portrait painters Abraham van den Tempel and Bartholomeus van der Helst. The downturn in the art market in Dordrecht and other Dutch cities as a result of the Rampjaar ('Disaster Year') of 1672, which was marked by a large-scale invasion of the Dutch Republic by French and other armies, likely also played a role. Maes must have counted on his fashionable portrait paintings to attract the patronage of Amsterdam's larger population of prosperous burghers. His calculation was correct as Maes was so much in demand as a portraitist in Amsterdam that sitters considered it a favour to be given the chance to have the artist paint their portrait. The great number of portraits dating to the 1670s and 1680s are evidence of his success as a society portraitist. His pupils in Dordrecht included his stepson Justus de Gelder, Margaretha van Godewijk, Jacob Moelaert, and Johannes Vollevens.

Despite his long-term residency in Amsterdam starting from 1673, Maes never became a citizen of Amsterdam. He waited until 1688 to register with the Amsterdam Guild of Saint Luke, only after the municipality had demanded a list of members from the Guild. Maes registered with the Guild not as a 'burgher' (citizen of Amsterdam), but as a resident. During his life he achieved financial success, as at his death his estate included 11,000 guilders in cash, two houses in Dordrecht and three houses in Amsterdam.

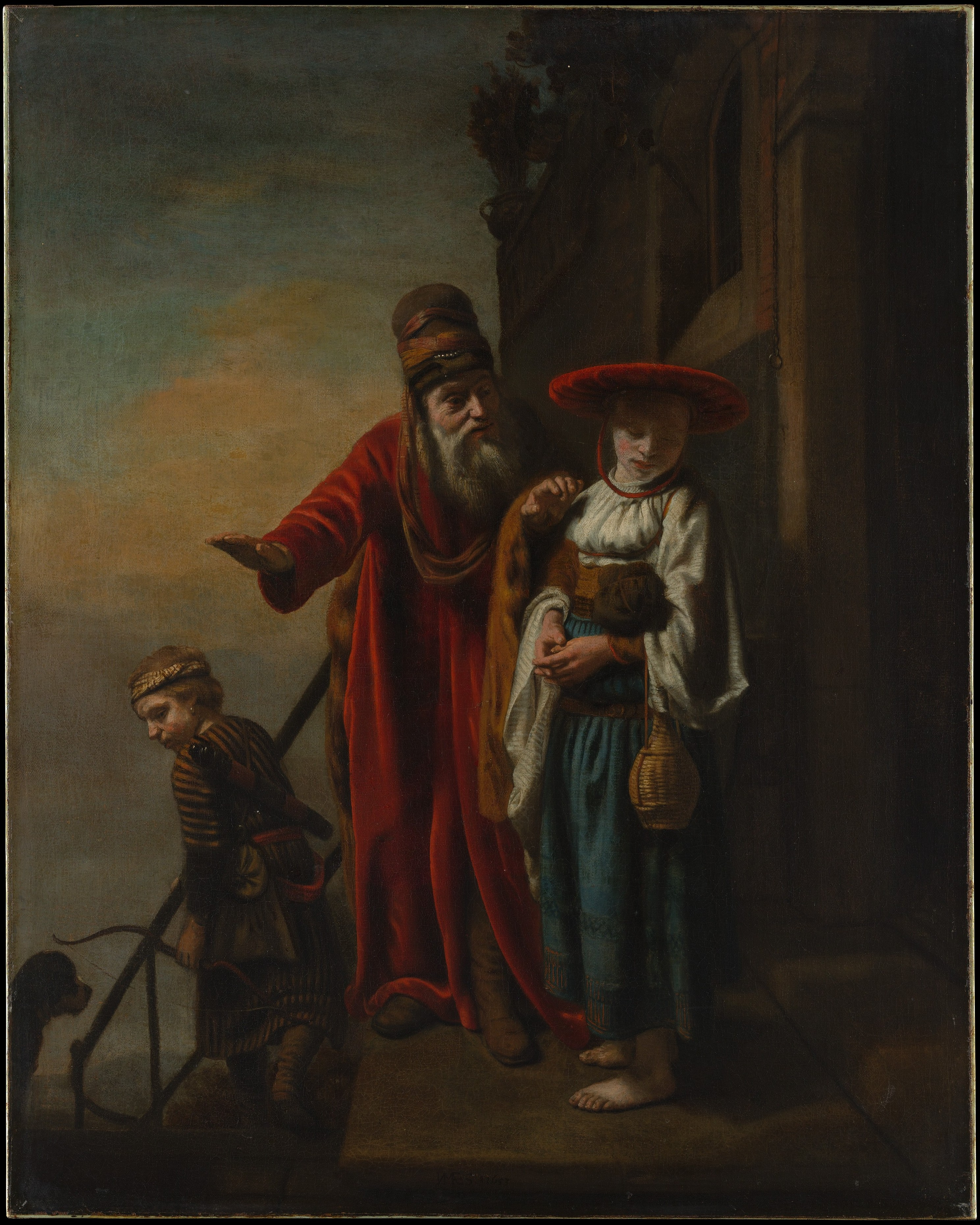
Dismissal of Hagar and Ishmael

Maes suffered from gout in the final years of his life. His wife Adriana Brouwers was buried in the Oude Kerk, Amsterdam on 14 March 1690. On 24 December 1693, he was buried alongside his wife.

== Works ==
=== Biblical and mythological scenes ===
In his early years as an independent artist in the early 1650s Maes painted a few biblical and mythological scenes. These include the Suffer the little Children to come unto Me (1652/3, London, National Gallery), Vertumnus and Pomona (possibly 1653, National Gallery of Ireland, Dublin) and Woman of Samaria at the Well (c.1653, Russell collection, Amsterdam). Maes's biblical compositions were clearly indebted to his master Rembrandt's models but show at the same time that he was capable of interpreting the Bible and the iconographic precedents in an original manner. For instance, in the Dismissal of Hagar and Ishmael (1653, Metropolitan Museum of Art, New York) Maes portrays Abraham banishing the handmaiden Hagar along with their son, Ishmael. By showing Hagar's despondency and Ishmael's isolated posture the work is one of the most moving renderings of this theme, popular with Rembrandt's pupils. Most of Maes's religious compositions are of cabinet size except for the Christ Blessing the Children (National Gallery, London) which depicts life-size figures.

=== Genre painting ===
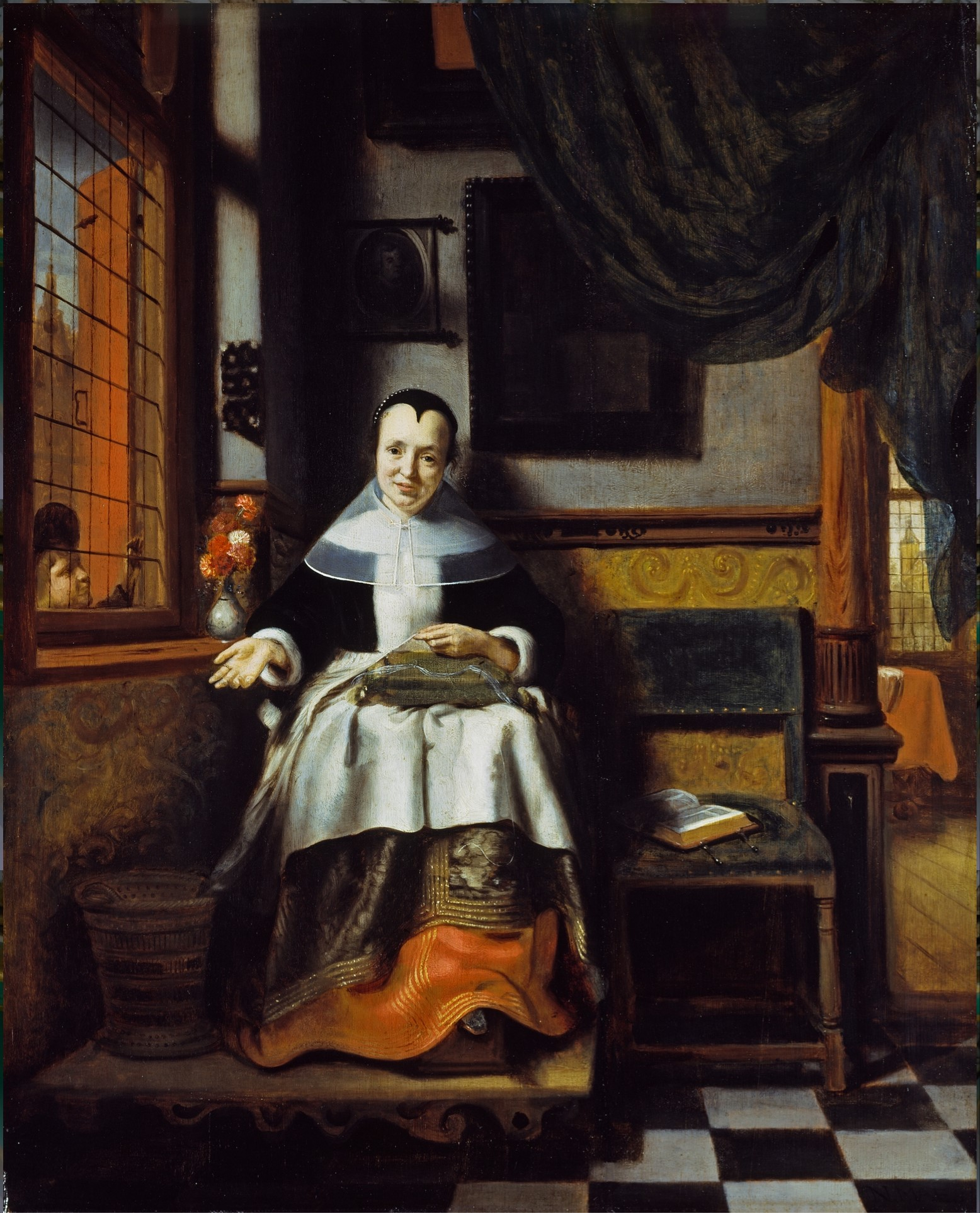
The virtuous woman

During this early period Maes showed himself to be among the most inventive genre painters in the Dutch Republic. He introduced new themes and invented unprecedented expressive poses, gestures and facial expressions. Maes painted various genre scenes set on the domestic doorsteps (for example A young boy receiving alms from an elderly man, 1656, Montreal Museum of Fine Arts) and others praising the virtues of good parenting. These works were influential on other Dutch painters such as Jan Steen. Maes applied Rembrandt's stylistic characteristics such as the brushwork and chiaroscuro to domestic scenes that were the favourite subject matter of Dutch genre artists of his time.

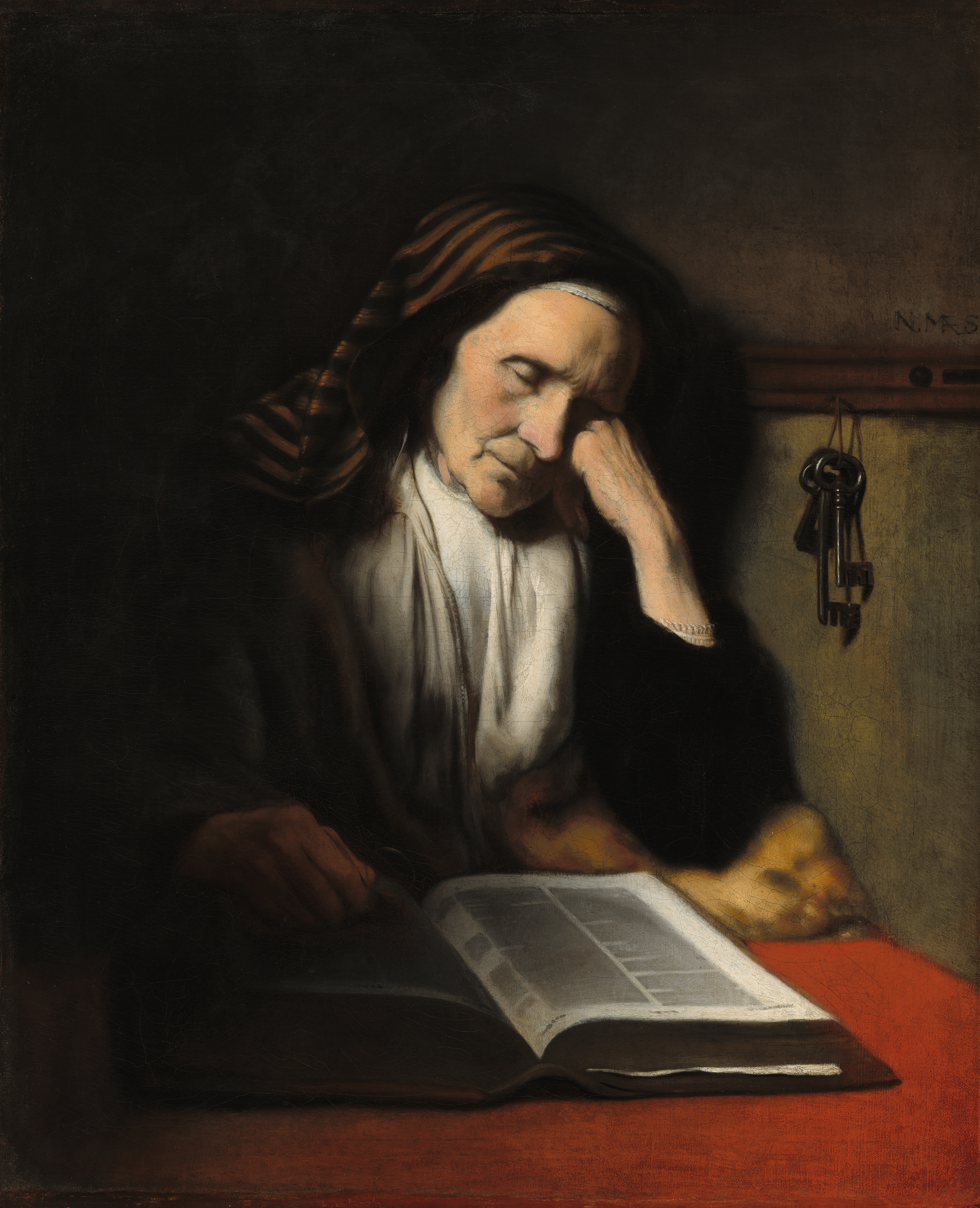
Old woman dozing

His paintings of domestic interiors showing women engaged in household tasks are endowed with a solemn dignity through the play of light and shadow and the limited colour palette derived from Rembrandt. Between 1654 and 1658, he created a large number of pictures of spinners, lace makers and mothers with children that express the contemporary moralistic view of the value of family life and quiet diligence. An example is The virtuous woman (c.1655, the Wallace Collection) which depicts a housewife sewing a shirt in a very tidy interior. An open Bible at her side implies that she is also clean and pious in spirit. A little boy at the window may indicate that the composition is a depiction of Proverbs 31, 10–19, about working hard and stretching the hand to the poor and the needy. Maes has thus transformed a simple domestic scene into an evocation of the exercise of dignity and moral uprightness in a true biblical sense.

Maes created some works showing everyday events occurring on the doorstep of a private house such as milkmaids ringing the doorbell or receiving payment or boys asking for alms. Maes was able to bestow on these mundane transactions a solemn dignity. Another theme treated by Maes in the mid-1650s are elderly female figures shown in half or three-quarter length such as an elderly woman saying grace before a simple meal, praying amid vanitas symbols or dozing over a Bible.

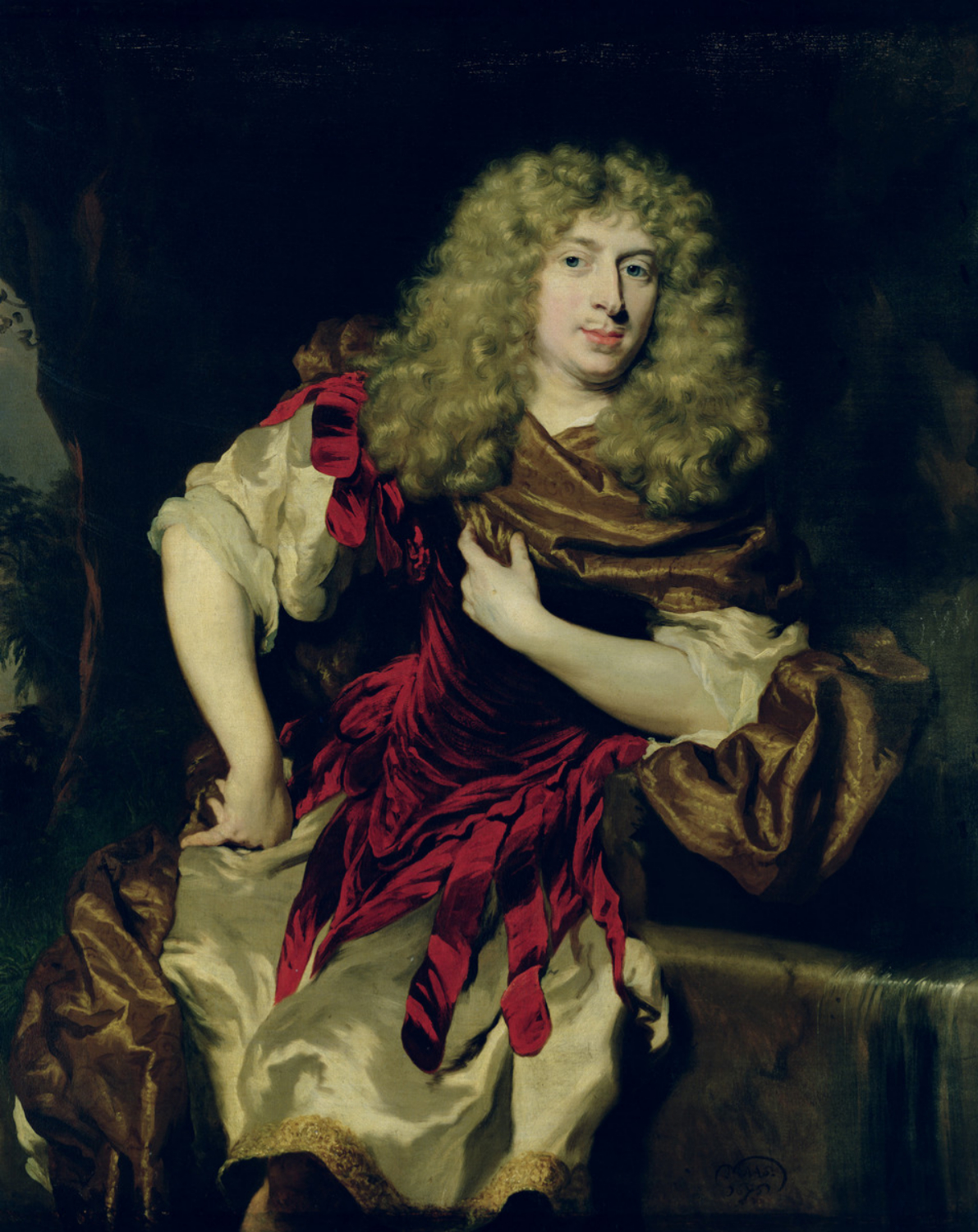
Portrait of a young man in fantasy costume

Maes's major contribution in the depiction of interior space was to treat domestic interiors not as shallow, three-walled boxes but as suites of rooms. These innovations in the structuring of interior space were likely inspired by the new story element he introduced in genre painting. These inventions had an important influence on Delft genre painters including Johannes Vermeer and Pieter de Hooch in particular in the compositional arrangements of people in interior spaces. Maes's exterior genre scenes may also have been influential on de Hooch's courtyard views.

=== Portrait painting ===
In his earlier portraits Maes places his sitters who are typically dressed and presented in an austere manner against a dark background. Maes's mature style was formed during the 1660s and shows the influence of the Flemish style of portraiture created by van Dyck, which had been introduced into the Dutch Republic in the previous decade. From this time onwards, Maes employed staging and accessories often seen in Flemish portraiture. In the 1670s Maes's style further developed to reflect the lighter spirit of the times as he places his sitters in elegant gardens painted in light tones and with a free brushstroke. These later portraits emphasize the gestures and poses, as well as the clothes and hairstyles of the models. The stylistic evolution of his portraits shows the influence of developments in Flemish and French portraiture.

Maes painted hundreds of portraits during his mature period. These were mostly executed in two standardised formats: the first used a small rectangular canvas to depict a half-length figure within a painted oval in a while the second used on a larger format to depict a three-quarter-length figure, who would be leaning against a prop such as a column, fountain or rock. The setting was often a terrace or garden against a sunset sky. He also created many group portraits of families or just children shown at full length amidst a landscape. During the 1670s and early 1680s he painted several portraits of children in the guise of mythological figures such as Ganymede, Apollo and Diana, either as single figure or in a family group. He further painted one group portrait of a guild, the Six Governors of the Amsterdam Surgeons' Guild (1680–81, Rijksmuseum Amsterdam).

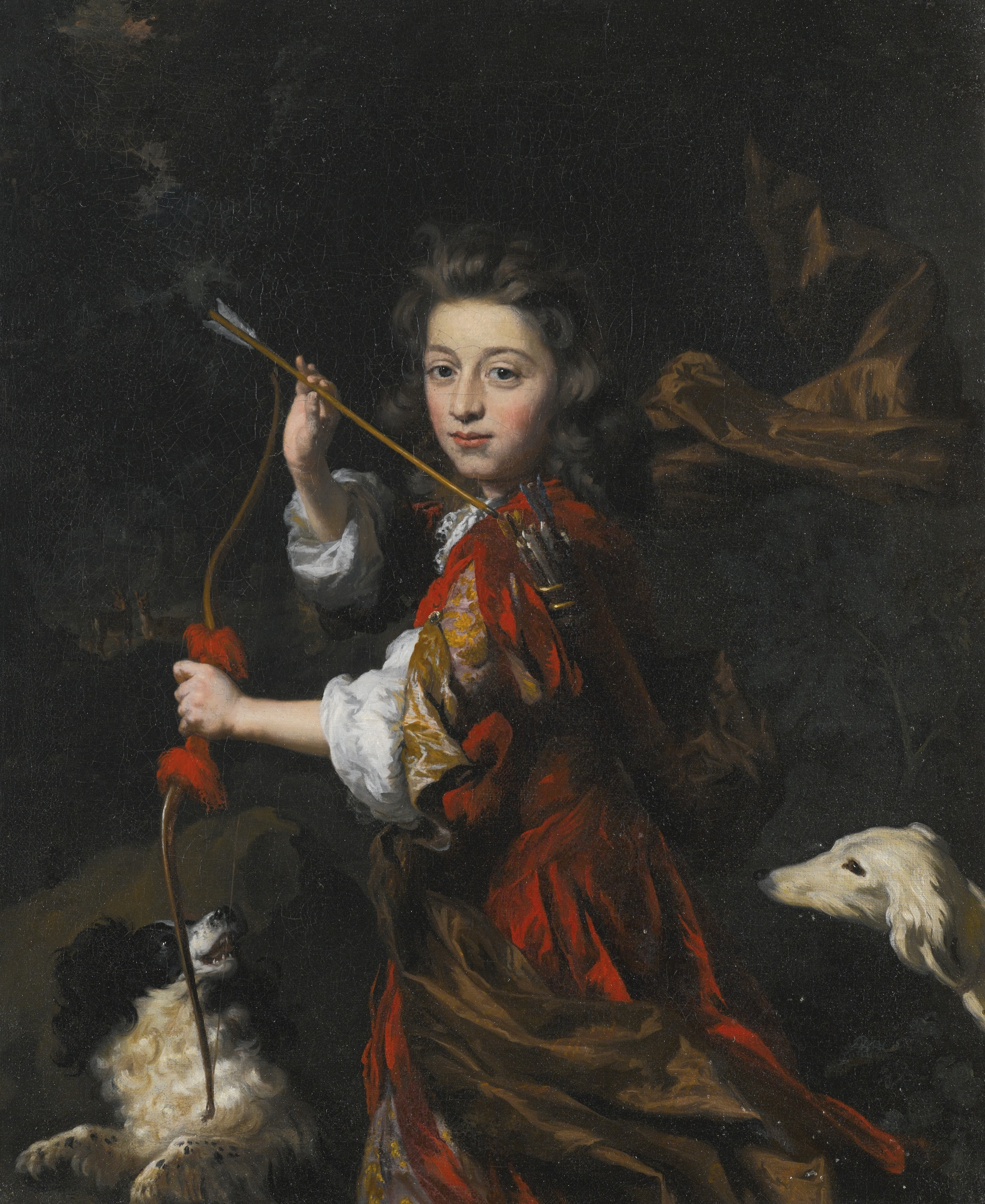
Portrait of a young nobleman with two dogs in a wooded landscape

== Selected works ==
- Portrait of Laurence Hyde, Earl of Rochester – Oil on canvas, 113 x 89.4 cm, Private collection
- Christ Before Pilate (1649–1650) – Oil on canvas, 216 x 174 cm, Museum of Fine Arts, Budapest
- Portrait of Four Children (1657) – Oil on canvas, 150 x 112 cm, Groeningemuseum, Bruges
- Christ Blessing the Children (1652–1653) –Oil on canvas, 206 x 154 cm, National Gallery, London
- Admiral Cornelis Evertsen the Youngest (1662) – Oil on Canvas
- Portrait of Justus Criex (1666) – Oil on canvas, 109 x 92 cm, Museum of Fine Arts, Budapest
- Eavesdropper with a Scolding Woman (1655) – Oil on panel, 46,3 x 72,2 cm, Private collection
- The Idle Servant (1655) – Oil on wood, 70 x 53 cm, National Gallery, London

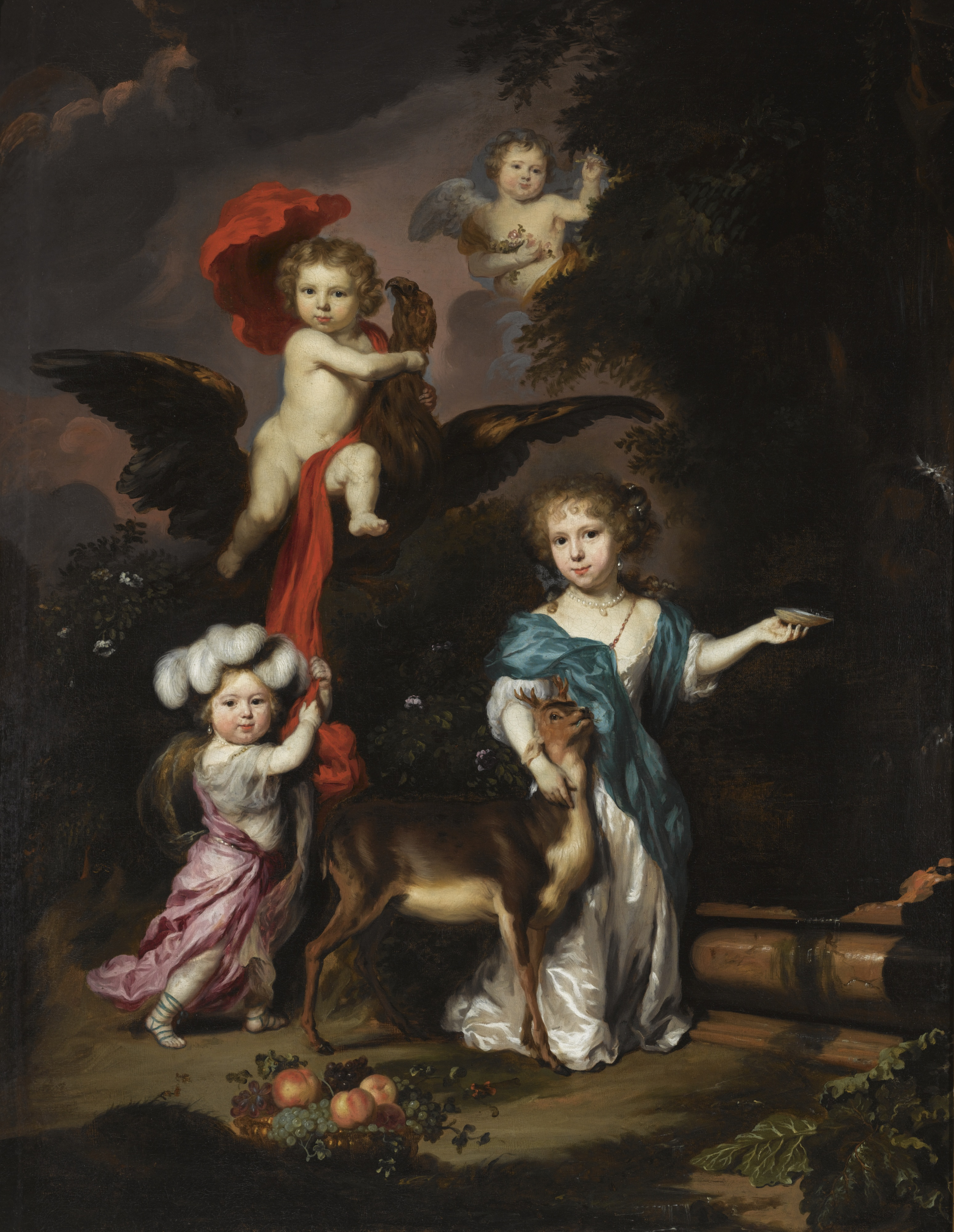
Four children as Ceres, Ganymede, Cherub and Diana

- The Lacemaker (1649–1650) – Oil on canvas, Metropolitan Museum of Art, New York
- The Lacemaker (1655) – oil on canvas National Gallery of Canada, Ottawa, Ontario
- Old Woman Dozing (1656) – Oil on canvas, 135 x 105 cm, Royal Museums of Fine Arts of Belgium, Brussels
- Portrait of a Woman (1667) – Oil on canvas, 90 x 72 cm, Musée d'Arras, Arras
- Portrait of a Woman – Oil on canvas, 89,6 x 71,2 cm, Museum voor Schone Kunsten, Ghent
- A Woman Spinning (1655) – Oil on panel, Rijksmuseum, Amsterdam
- Apostle Thomas (1656) – Oil on canvas, Museumslandschaft Hessen Kassel
- Woman Plucking a Duck (c.1656) – Oil on canvas, Philadelphia Museum of Art, Philadelphia
- Old Woman at Prayer (c.1656) – Oil on canvas, 134 x 113 cm, Rijksmuseum, Amsterdam
- Doing the Accounts (1656) – Oil on canvas, 66 x 54 cm, Saint Louis Art Museum, Saint Louis
- The Eavesdropper (1657) – Oil on canvas, 92 x 122 c, Dordrechts Museum
- Portrait of Jacob Trip (c.1660) – Oil on canvas, 88 x 68 cm, Museum of Fine Arts, Budapest
- Portrait of Margaretha de Geer, Wife of Jacob Trip (c.1660) – Oil on canvas, 88 x 68 cm, Museum of Fine Arts, Budapest
- Portrait of Simon van Alphen (c.1680) – Oil on canvas, 71 x 57 cm, Rijksmuseum, Amsterdam
- Portrait of William the Third of Orange (after 1677) – Oil on canvas, Blanton Art Museum Austin, Texas
- Bathing (between 1655 and 1660) – Oil on canvas, 72.5 × 81.5 cm, Louvre, Paris
- Portrait of a Lady (1677) – Oil on canvas, 67.6 × 56.5 cm, Timken Museum of Art, San Diego
