= Willaerts =

Willaerts is a surname of Dutch origin. People with that name include:

- Abraham Willaerts (c. 1603 - 1669), Dutch painter
- Adam Willaerts (1577–1664), Dutch painter
- Isaac Willaerts (1610/1620 - 1693), Dutch painter

== See also ==
- Adrian Willaert (c. 1490 - 1562), Flemish composer
- Steve Willaert (active from 1993), Belgian composer, arranger, musician and producer
