= Willem Ormea =

Dutch painter

Willem Ormea (1611–1673) was a Dutch Golden Age painter known for his still lifes of subjects such as fish.

== Life ==
Willem was the son of the painter Marcus Ormea and Johanna van Gladbeck. He was born in Utrecht in 1611, and probably learnt the art of painting from his father. He was active in Utrecht between 1634 and 1673, surviving works dating from 1634 to 1658. In 1638, he gave the Hospital of St. Hiob a painting of various types of fish. He was a member of the Guild of St. Luke in 1665. He married Johanna van Veen.

His paintings were mainly of animals, marine and still lifes with fish, sometimes in harbours. Together with his father, he is considered the founder of the still life movement in Utrecht. He collaborated with Adam Willaerts and was influenced by JB Wijtvelt. He had Jacob Gillig as a pupil.

== Works ==
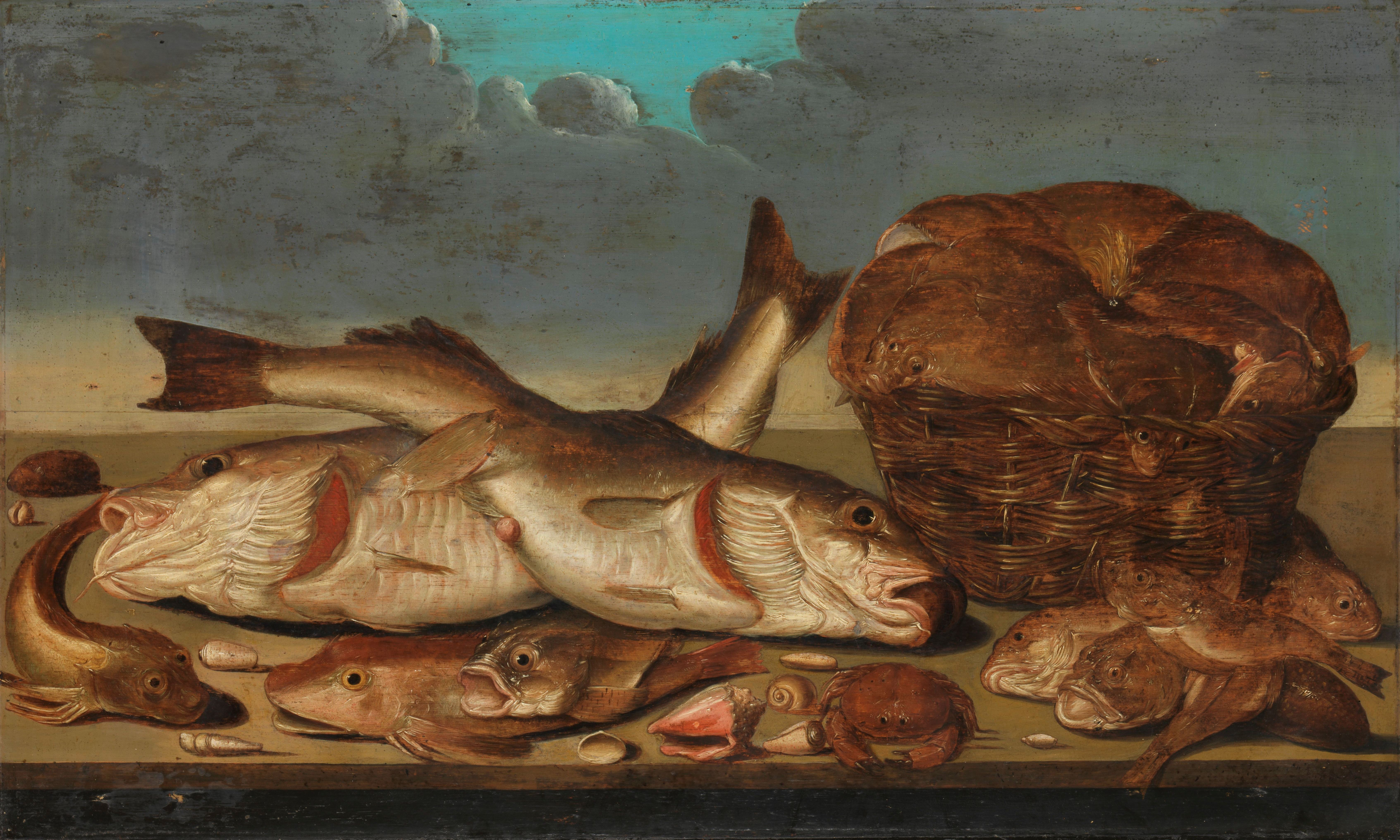
Still life with fish, 1638

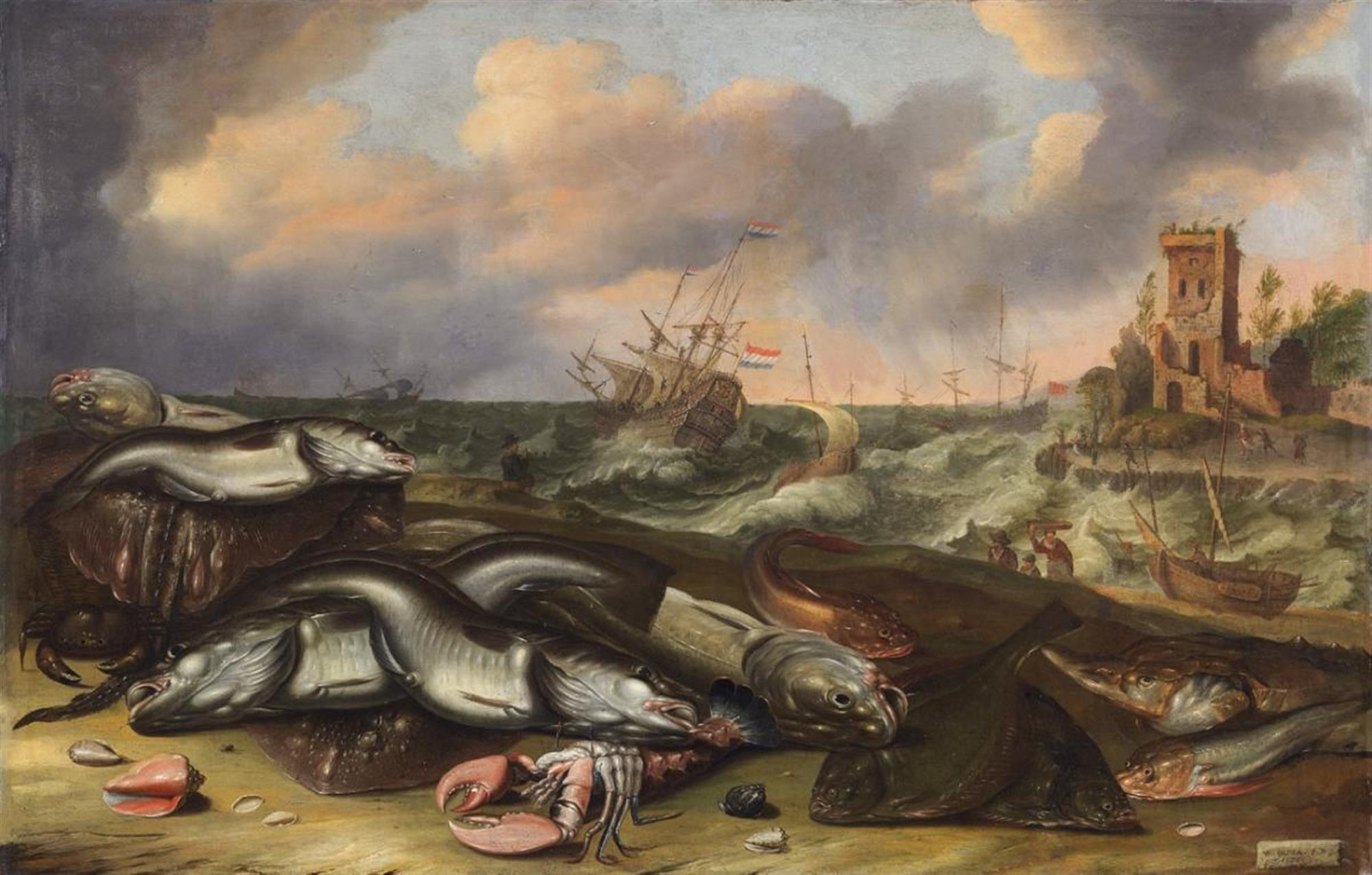
With Abraham Willaerts: Fish still life with stormy sea, 1636

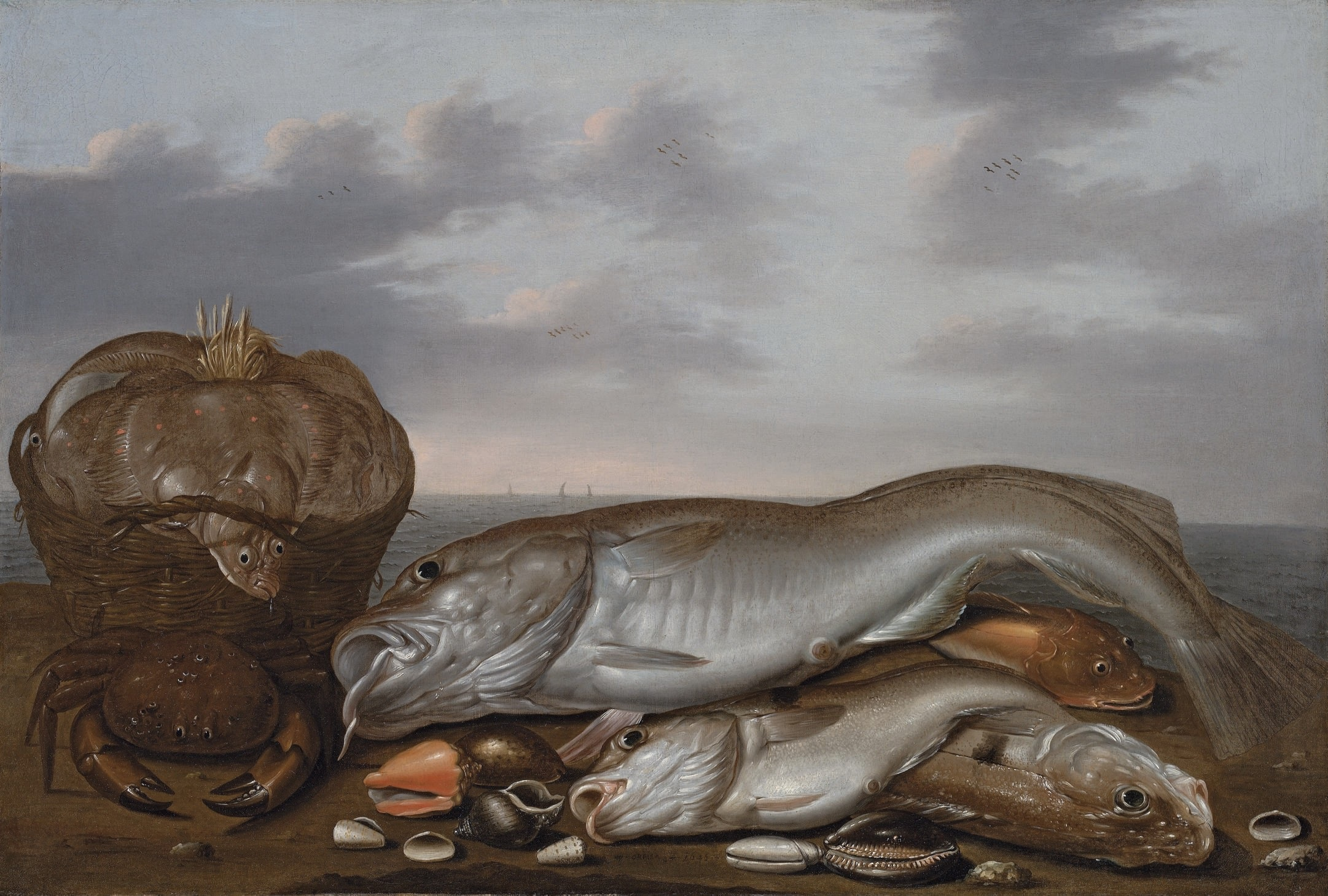
Still life with a basket of sole, 1646

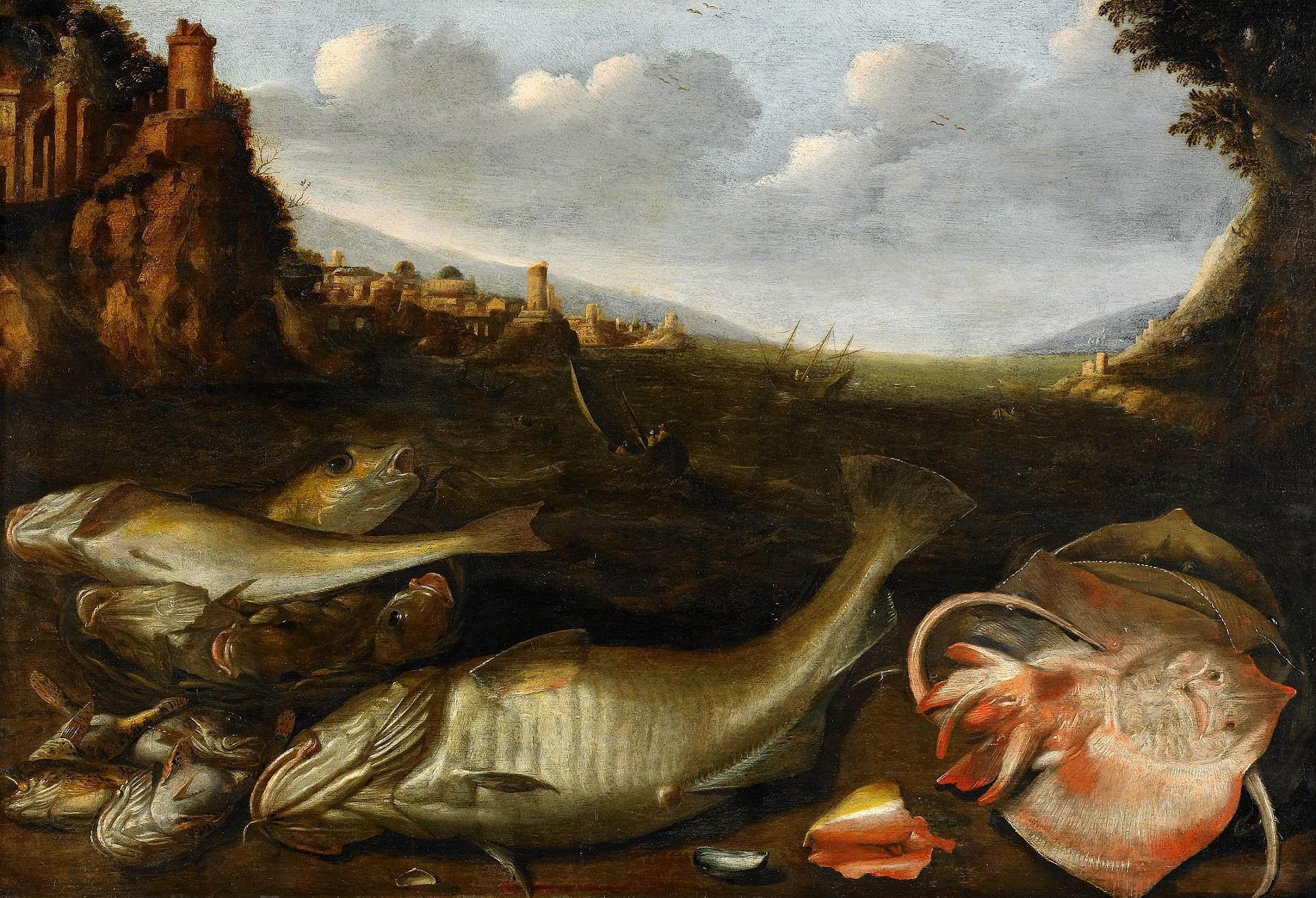
Fish still life on a shore

== Sources ==
- "Willem Ormea". Rijksbureau voor Kunsthistorische Documentatie (in Dutch). 2013.
- Johannes Immerzeel (1848). Schinkel (ed.). De levens en werken der hollandsche en vlaamsche kunstschilders, beeldhouwers, graveurs en bouwmeesters (in Dutch). Vol. I. p. 283.
- Abraham Jacob van der Aa; Karel Johan Reinier van Harderwijk & Gilles Dionysius Jacobus Schotel (1867). J.J. van Brederode (ed.). Biografisch Woordenboek der Nederlanden (in Dutch). Vol. XIV°. p. 206.
- Sheila D. Muller, ed. (1997). Dutch Art: An Encyclopedia. pp. 366–402. ISBN 0-8153-0065-4.
- Donna R. Barnes; Peter G. Rose (2002). Albany Institute of History and Art (ed.). Matters of Taste: Food and Drink in Seventeenth-century Dutch Art and Life. Vol. I. pp. 50–72. ISBN 0-8156-0747-4.
