= Isaac Ducart =

Dutch painter

Isaac Ducart (1630 in Amsterdam – 1727 in Amsterdam), was a Dutch Golden Age painter active in England.

According to Houbraken he was a colleague and the same age as the flower painter Abraham Mignon - he painted flowers on satin in his studio in Amsterdam. He was assisted by his wife, a painter whom he had married while living in England. She was near-sighted and a poor housekeeper and their household included a dog that pooped on the floor, which did not go unnoticed by their patrons. Husband and wife both worked at their easels smoking a pipe. Their material of choice was satin rather than canvas, which may be the reason that no works have survived. Though they painted generally on satin, this had an extraordinary effect. Ducart died in 1727, aged 67.
