= 118 and 120 Micklegate =

Listed building in York, England

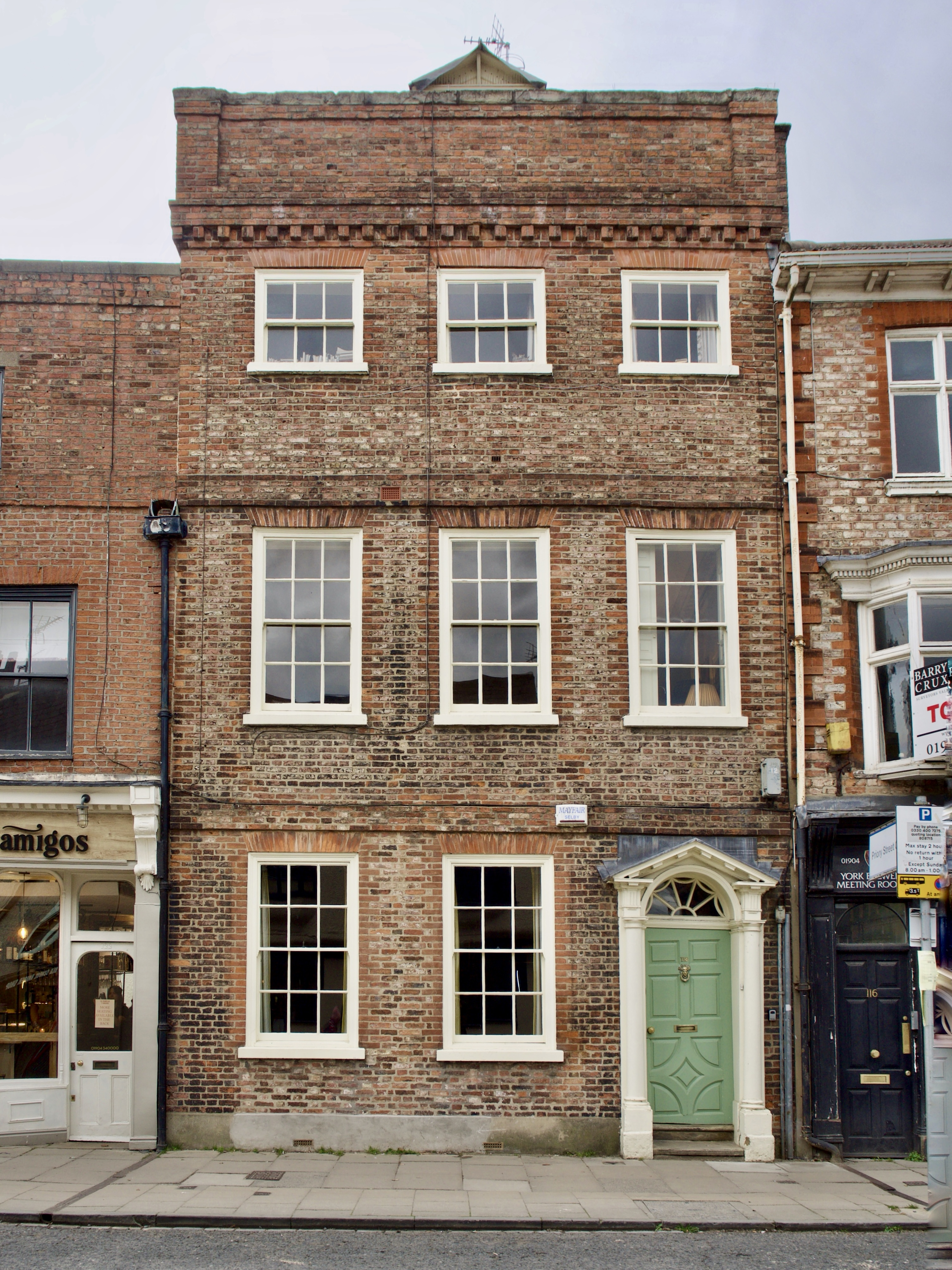
- The building in 2026
- Interactive map of the 118 and 120 Micklegate area

General information
- Status: Private residence
- Location: Micklegate, York, England
- Coordinates: 53.9566°N 1.0902°W
- Year built: c. 1740; 286 years ago
- Renovated: Late 18th and early 19th centuries (altered); 1948–49 and 1968 (restored)
- Client: Robert Bower

Listed Building – Grade II*
- Official name: 118 and 120, Micklegate
- Designated: 14 June 1954
- Reference no.: 1257264

118 and 120 Micklegate is a Grade II* listed building on Micklegate in the city of York, England. Built around 1740 for Robert Bower, it passed through several owners in the 18th and 19th centuries, including George Peacock, printer and twice lord mayor. The house was altered in the late 18th and early 19th centuries, gained a shopfront by the 1870s, and was restored in the mid‑20th century, serving as the York Georgian Society's headquarters before returning to private use. It stands between No. 116, listed at Grade II, and Nos. 122–126, also listed at Grade II*.

== History ==
Standing on Micklegate, the house was built around 1740 for Robert Bower, who had bought the site the previous year. The house was completed before 1750 and later passed to Matthew Chitty St Quintin, remaining in the St Quintin family until 1785. It then changed hands several times, including Stephen Atkinson and William Taylor, before being bought in 1806 by George Peacock, printer and twice lord mayor, who lived there until his death in 1836. The property continued as a private residence through much of the 19th century and gained a shopfront by the 1870s. Alterations during the late 18th and early 19th centuries included the addition of a parapet, new internal fittings and changes to the upper rooms, with a rear range likely added by the 1830s. The house was restored in 1948–49 and used as the York Georgian Society's headquarters until 1967, after which it returned to private ownership; the ground floor was restored again in 1968.

On 14 June 1954, Nos. 118–120 were designated a Grade II* listed building, and in 1968 the site was included within the newly established Central Historic Core conservation area. It stands between the Grade II-listed No. 116, and Nos. 122–126, also Grade II* listed.

== Architecture ==
The front is built of mottled brick with simple brick detailing at the eaves, orange‑red brick surrounds, and a timber doorcase. A parapet with stone coping and end piers hides the slate roof, which is hipped towards the street, and there is a brick chimney along the ridge.

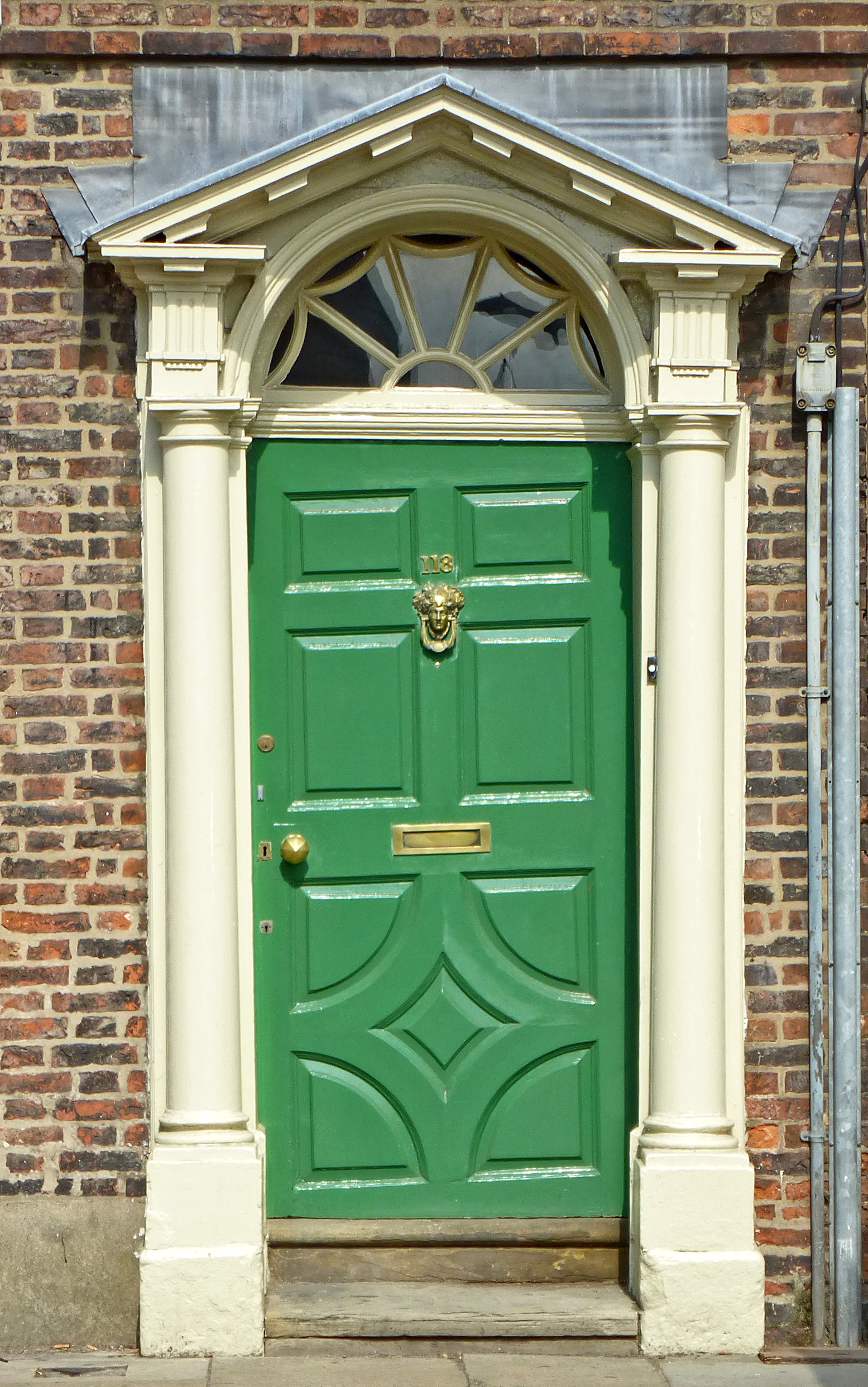
The building's entrance in 2013

The street front has three storeys and an attic, arranged in three bays. To the right is a doorway framed by a pedimented surround with Doric columns, and a door with shaped panels beneath a fanlight. The ground and first floors have 12‑pane sash windows, the ground‑floor openings replacing a later 19th‑century shopfront; the second floor has 6‑pane sashes. All windows sit on painted stone sills and have flat brick heads. Narrow raised brick bands mark the first and second‑floor levels, and there is a gabled dormer in the attic.

At the rear, the building again has three storeys and an attic, with a three‑bay gable wall capped in brick. A six‑panel door with a divided overlight stands to the left. The windows have flat brick heads, and raised brick bands run across the first and second floors. A brick dentil course sits below the attic, which has a 6‑pane sash. The rainwater goods include decorative fleur-de-lis fixings.

=== Interior ===
A staircase runs from the cellars up to the attic, built so that each step projects without visible support. It has turned balusters, three on each step with every third one twisted, and a shaped handrail that curves around a newel at the foot. The stairwell floor is laid in marble mosaic.

On the ground floor, the front room has a dado, raised wall panelling and a cornice with small block detailing. The fireplace has a surround with projecting corners, a decorated frieze and a shelf, and above it an overmantel with a scroll‑shaped top that includes a painted seascape by Adam Willaerts. Matching door surrounds flank the fireplace.

The front room on the first floor has a plain dado, moulded panelling and a cornice with bracket‑like detailing. Its fireplace has a surround with projecting corners, a later grate, and a frieze with foliage and a central relief mask. The overmantel has a panel of classical figures framed by vine ornament, and a cornice topped by a broken swan‑neck pediment with a garlanded urn. Panelled shutters remain in place. The rear rooms are also panelled; the room to the right has a marble fireplace with a foliate frieze, a shelf, and an overmantel in a raised surround with projecting corners.

On the second floor, original fireplaces and fittings survive, but the rooms no longer retain panelling.

== See also ==
- Grade II* listed buildings in the City of York
- Listed buildings in York (within the city walls, southern part)
