= Isaac Willaerts =

Dutch painter

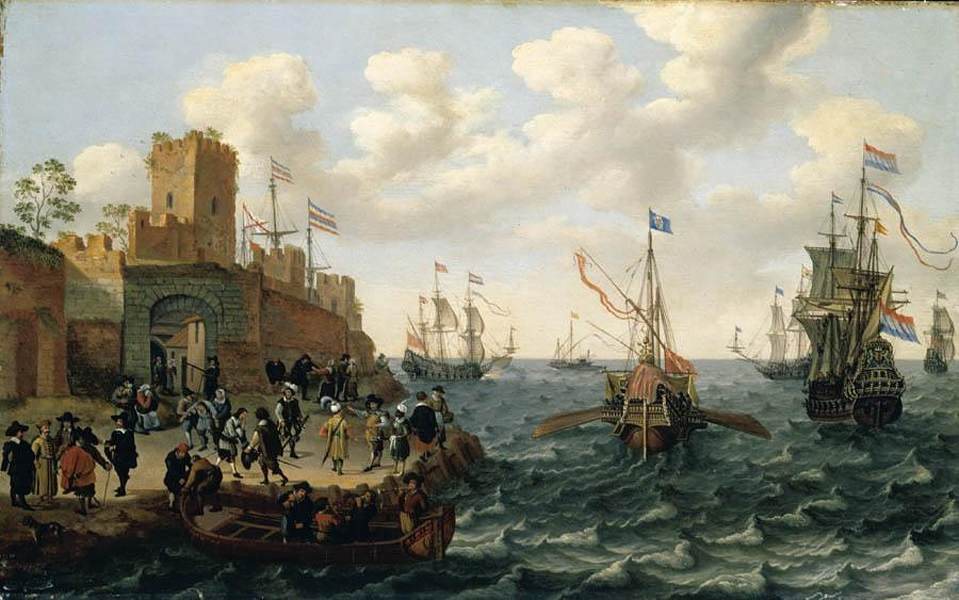
Coastal Landscape

Isaac Willaerts (1610/1620, Utrecht - 24 June 1693, Utrecht) was a Dutch painter who specialized in coastal landscapes and maritime scenes.

== Life and work ==
His father was the painter, Adam Willaerts, who gave him his first art lessons. His brothers Abraham and Cornelis also became painters. He worked primarily in Utrecht and was a member of the Guild of Saint Luke, where he became an apprentice in 1637, and a Master in 1666.

In 1667, he was commissioned by the City of Utrecht to restore portraits of members of the Brotherhood of Jerusalem, which had been painted in the preceding century by Jan van Scorel.

His style is very similar to that of his brother, Abraham. He often collaborated with other painters, such as Jacob Gillig and Willem Ormea, for whom he painted the background seascapes to accompany his still-lifes of fish.
