= Abraham Mignon =

Dutch painter (1640–1679)

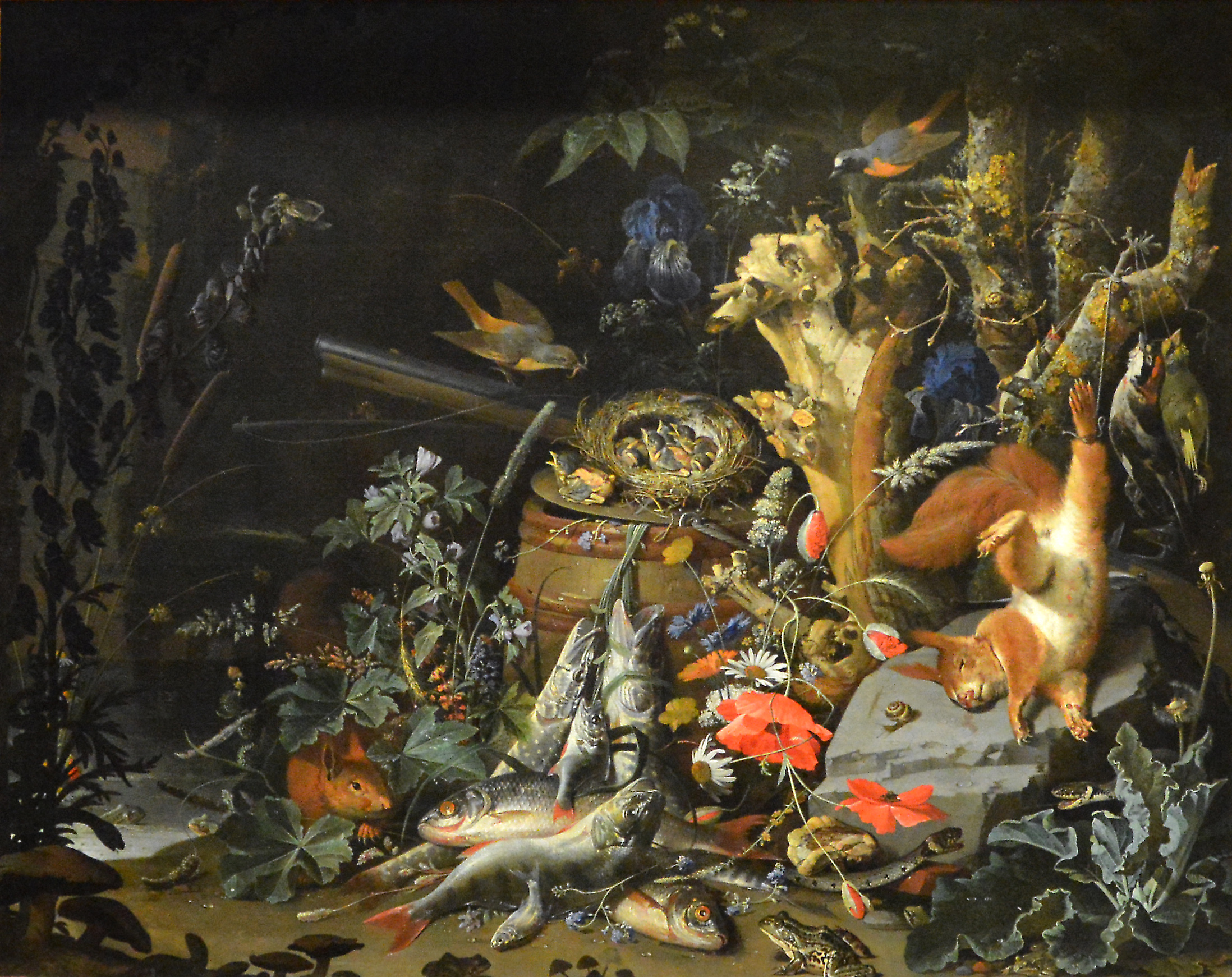
Still life of game in a forest

Abraham Mignon or Minjon (21 June 1640 – 27 March 1679) was a Dutch still life painter. He is known for his flower pieces, still lifes with fruit, still lifes in forests or grottoes, still lifes of game and fish as well as his garland paintings. His works are influenced by those of Jan Davidszoon de Heem and Jacob Marrel.

After commencing his artistic training in his native Germany, he moved to the Dutch Republic where he was active in Utrecht during the last part of his short life. His works were sought after by 17th and 18th-century collectors from the highest ranks of society throughout Europe.

== Life ==
Mignon was born in Frankfurt where he was baptized in the Calvinist church on 21 June 1640. His family was originally from Hainaut in the Southern Netherlands from where it had immigrated to Germany for religious reasons. In Frankfurt they owned a shop.

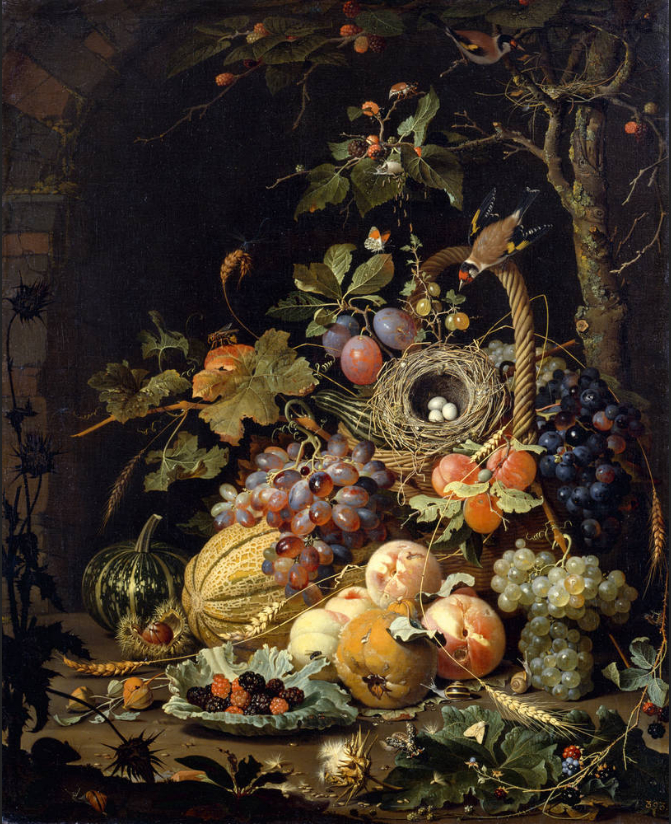
A bird's nest in a fruit basket

When Abraham's family moved to Wetzlar in 1649, Abraham was placed in the care of Jacob Marrel, a specialist flower painter and art dealer. Marrel gave the young boy also artistic training. He clearly trusted Mignon to handle his business, as he would leave it in Mignon's hands during his frequent visits to the Dutch Republic and in particular, Utrecht. It was also Marrell who asked Mignon to train his live-in stepdaughter Maria Sibylla Merian (1647–1717) in the art of still-life painting. Maria Sibylla Merian was the daughter of the engraver Matthew Merian (1647–1717). Maria Sibylla Merian achieved distinction as a flower painter.

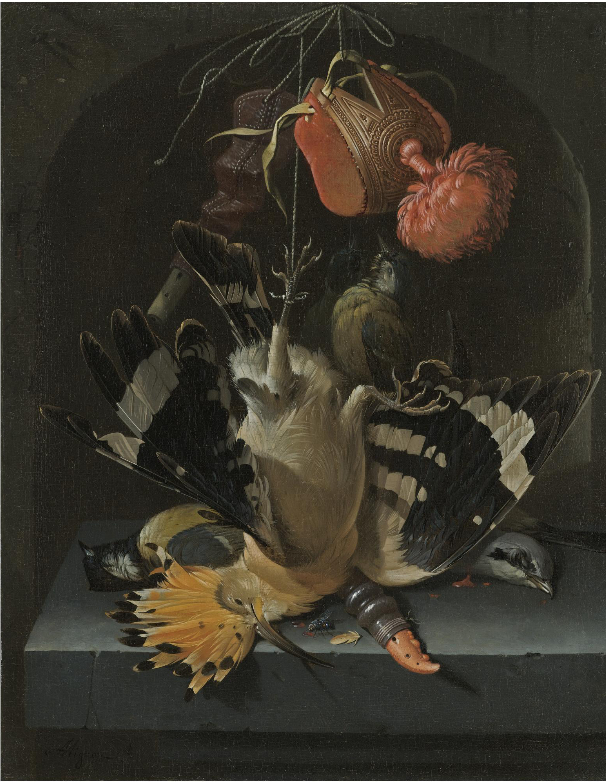
Still life with a hoopoe, a great tit, a falconry hood and a decoy whistle all arranged within a stone niche

It is possible that in 1660 Mignon had moved to Wetzlar where the rest of his family had moved. Other sources state that by 1659 Marrell and Mignon had left Frankfurt for Utrecht. It is possible that the death of Mignon's father around this time prompted the relocation to Utrecht. In 1669 Marrel and Mignon were both registered in the Guild of Saint Luke there. Mignon was an assistant in the workshop of Jan Davidszoon de Heem in Utrecht. Jan Davidszoon de Heem was an important innovator of still life painting who had worked for many years in Antwerp before returning to Utrecht in 1667. It is possible that after de Heem moved back to Antwerp in 1672 Mignon took over de Heem's workshop.

Throughout his life Mignon seems to have held on to the strict religious beliefs of his family. This is confirmed by his election in 1672 to the position of deacon of the Waalse Kerk (Walloon Church) of Utrecht, a position he remained in for five years. He married Maria Willaerts on 3 February 1675 in the French reformed Janskerk in Utrecht. His wife was the granddaughter of the marine painter Adam Willaerts, daughter of the painter Cornelis Willaerts and niece of the fish still life painter Jacob Gillig. Some sources state that Mignon moved back to his native Frankfurt in 1676 based on a record that seems to imply that his 6th child was baptized in Frankfurt on 17 December 1676. By 1677 he would then have moved back to Utrecht.

Mignon died in Utrecht at the age of 39. He left two daughters when he died, Catharina and Anna.

Besides Maria Sibylla Merian, another known pupil of Mignon was Ernst Stuven.

== Work ==
=== General ===
Mignon was a specialist still life painter whose subjects ranged from flowers, fruit, forest still lifes, game pieces, garland paintings, fish still lifes and insect pieces. His best-known works are his elaborate compositions of flowers and fruits arranged in niches or on stone ledges, or displayed in grottos or amidst ruins. As Mignon never dated his compositions it has been notoriously difficult to establish a chronology for his work. On stylistic grounds it is assumed that his more elaborate still lifes of flowers, characterised by clear colours, sharp focus and the use of a dark background, are Mignon's distillation of de Heem's style. Such works likely date from the years around 1670 when he was working closely with his master in de Heem's workshop.

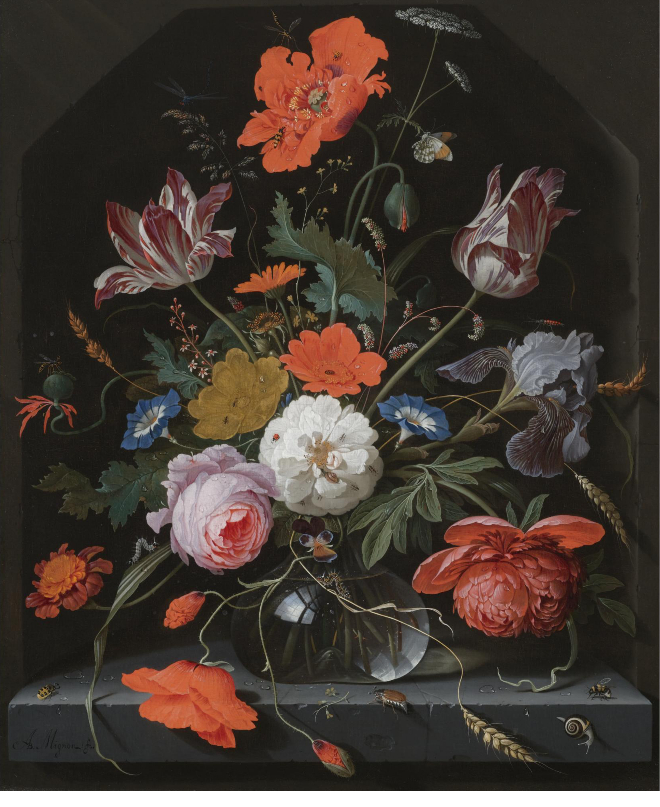
Still life with peonies, roses, parrot tulips, morning glory, an iris and poppies in a glass vase set within a stone niche and caterpillars, a snail, a bee and a cockchafer on the ledge below

The majority of Mignon's works take the portrait format and only a few are in landscape format. As Mignon died at a relatively young age, it is reasonable to assume that the circa 400 still-life paintings attributed to him were executed with the assistance of his workshop or by followers of his style. His large output demonstrates the popularity of his works, which were collected widely in the 17th and 18h centuries, including by king Louis XIV of France and the Elector of Saxony. Mignon's success also attracted followers and imitators such as Jan Mortel, Conraet Roepel and Jacob Bart.

The principal influences on his work are the works of de Heem and Marrel. De Heem's compositions were the principal reference point for Mignon's still lifes. His work is distinguished from de Heem by his rendering of nature in a cooler, more distant and sterile manner, through the precision in detail and drawing. His flower pieces are marked by their careful finish and delicate handling. Mignon preferred a red, yellow and blue color palette and highly realistic manner of depicting nature. His favourite scheme was to introduce red or white roses in the centre of the canvas and to set the whole group of flowers against a dark background.

Mignon also took inspiration from Willem van Aelst and Otto Marseus van Schrieck in his game and insect pieces. Willem van Aelst was clearly an inspiration for the game pieces while the influence of Otto Marseus van Schrieck is particularly visible in Mignon's forest floor still lifes.

=== Themes ===
As can be expected in still life paintings from the 17th century, religious symbolism is often present in the works of Mignon, an artist who was deeply religious. Such symbolism is clearly present in the Still life with peonies, roses, parrot tulips, morning glory, an iris and poppies in a glass vase set within a stone niche and caterpillars, a snail, a bee and a cockchafer on the ledge below (Sotheby's London sale of 4 July 2007 lot 41) in which various religious themes are expressed symbolically. God's creation is symbolised through the four elements which at the time were believed to be the building blocks for everything existing in the visible world: earth is symbolised by its products (flowers, insects, stone), air by the flying insects, fire by the glass vase (which is made by fire) and water is present through the water inside the vase. The ears of corn are usually a reference to the Resurrection of Jesus as well as to the cycle of life. This theme is further expressed by the presence of caterpillars, an insect which turns into butterflies.

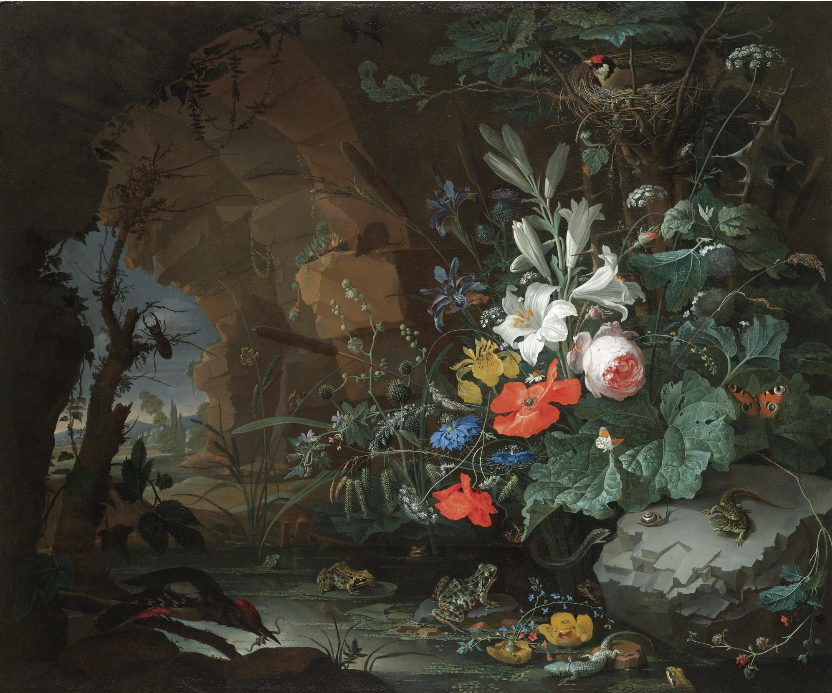
Interior of a grotto with a rock-pool, frogs, salamanders and a bird's nest

The motif of Vanitas or transience of life is also often present. This motif is inspired by the Christian belief that the world is only a temporary place of fleeting pleasures and sorrows from which mankind can only escape through the sacrifice and resurrection of Jesus. Mignon often represents the theme of transience through the poppies in his still lifes. For example, in the Still life with peonies, roses, parrot tulips, morning glory, an iris and poppies in a glass vase set within a stone niche and caterpillars, a snail, a bee and a cockchafer on the ledge below, the poppy in the centre is fresh, the one at the top is mature while the one hanging over the ledge is already wilting. Vanitas symbolism can also be found in the Still life with fruits, foliage and insects (Minneapolis Institute of Art). The fruit in the composition looks nice on first view but on closer inspection, it is clear it has already started to rot. The strong oak tree shows signs of blight. A stone in the foreground refers to the inevitable decay of buildings erected by humans, a theme that is reprised in the crumbling arch in the background on the right. In the Still life with flowers and a watch (Rijksmuseum) the inclusion of a watch and wilting flowers clearly emphasizes the vanitas symbolism of time destroying everything.

Abraham Mignon painted a few pronkstillevens, the sumptuous still lifes that were popular in Flanders and the Dutch Republic from the 1640s. His work in this genre was influenced by Jan Davidsz. de Heem who played an important role in developing the genre during his residence in Antwerp. A representative example in this genre is the Still life with fruit and oysters (Rijksmuseum). Mignon's stylistic and thematic development bears witness to the blurring of boundaries between the distinctive specialties in still life painting such as vanitas pieces, game pieces, pronkstilllevens, etc. that started in the middle of the 17th century. This blurring allowed artists to experiment with the mixing of genres. An example is Mignon's Still life of game in a forest (Louvre, 1675) in which the traditional elements of a still life are transposed to a forest. The result is a mixing of earlier genre categories and conventions. The use of a forest floor as the setting for a still life piece was not entirely new as Otto Marseus van Schrieck had already introduced it.

== Nazi-looted art ==
In 1938, the Nazi Gestapo seized Mignon's Blumenstück from the Jewish art collector Rudolf Guttmann in Vienna. Agents of Hitler's Fuhrermuseum acquired Blumenstück at the Dorotheum on October 10, 1943. The Monuments Men recovered it and moved to it the Central Collecting Point until 1951. It was sold at Christies Mauerbach Benefit Auction in October 1996.

The German Lost Art Foundation currently lists seven artworks by Mignon, of which two have been the object of "amicable settlement".

The Max Stern Art Restitution Project also lists a Mignon among the stolen artworks it is actively looking for.
