= Jan Mortel =

Dutch painter

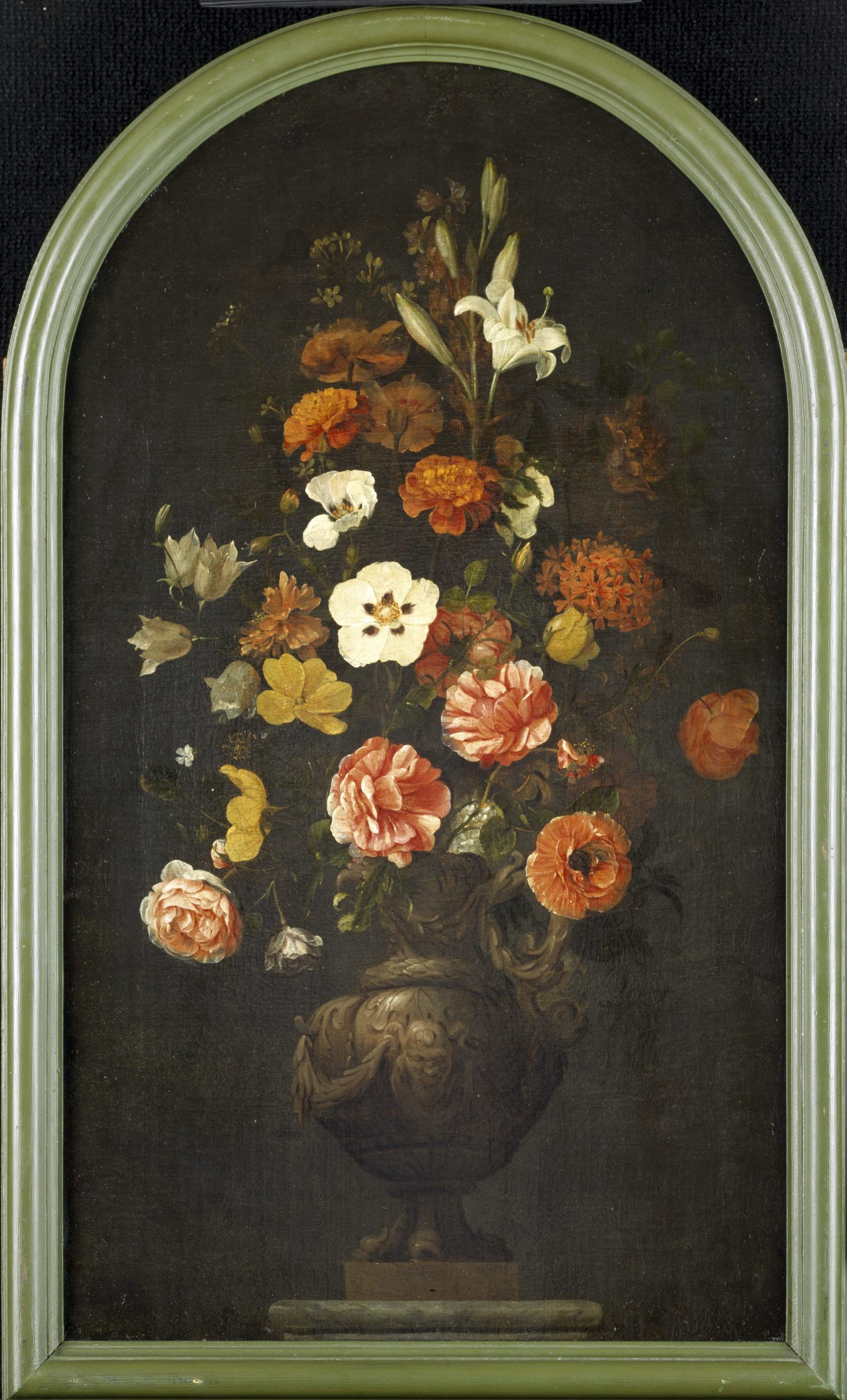
Flowers from the Leiden Botanical gardens, 1688

Jan Mortel (baptized 16 October 1652 – 15 October 1719) was a Dutch Golden Age flower painter.

Mortel was born and died in Leiden. He was a pupil of Jan Porcellis van Delden and became a master in the Leiden Guild of St. Luke in 1675. Mortel painted primarily still lifes, often combining fruits and flowers with insects and butterflies. Some of his works were copies after Abraham Mignon or Mignon's teacher Jan Davidsz de Heem. In 1690 he was appointed as Leiden University's official artist for their Hortus Botanicus Leiden, where he worked closely with the prefect, which position was filled from 1709 by Herman Boerhaave.
