= Allegory of the Dutch Defeat of the Spanish Fleet in Gibraltar =

Painting by Adam Willaerts

Allegory of the Dutch Defeat of the Spanish Fleet in Gibraltar, 25 April 1607
- Allegorie op de overwinning van de Hollandse op de Spaanse vloot bij Gibraltar (Dutch)
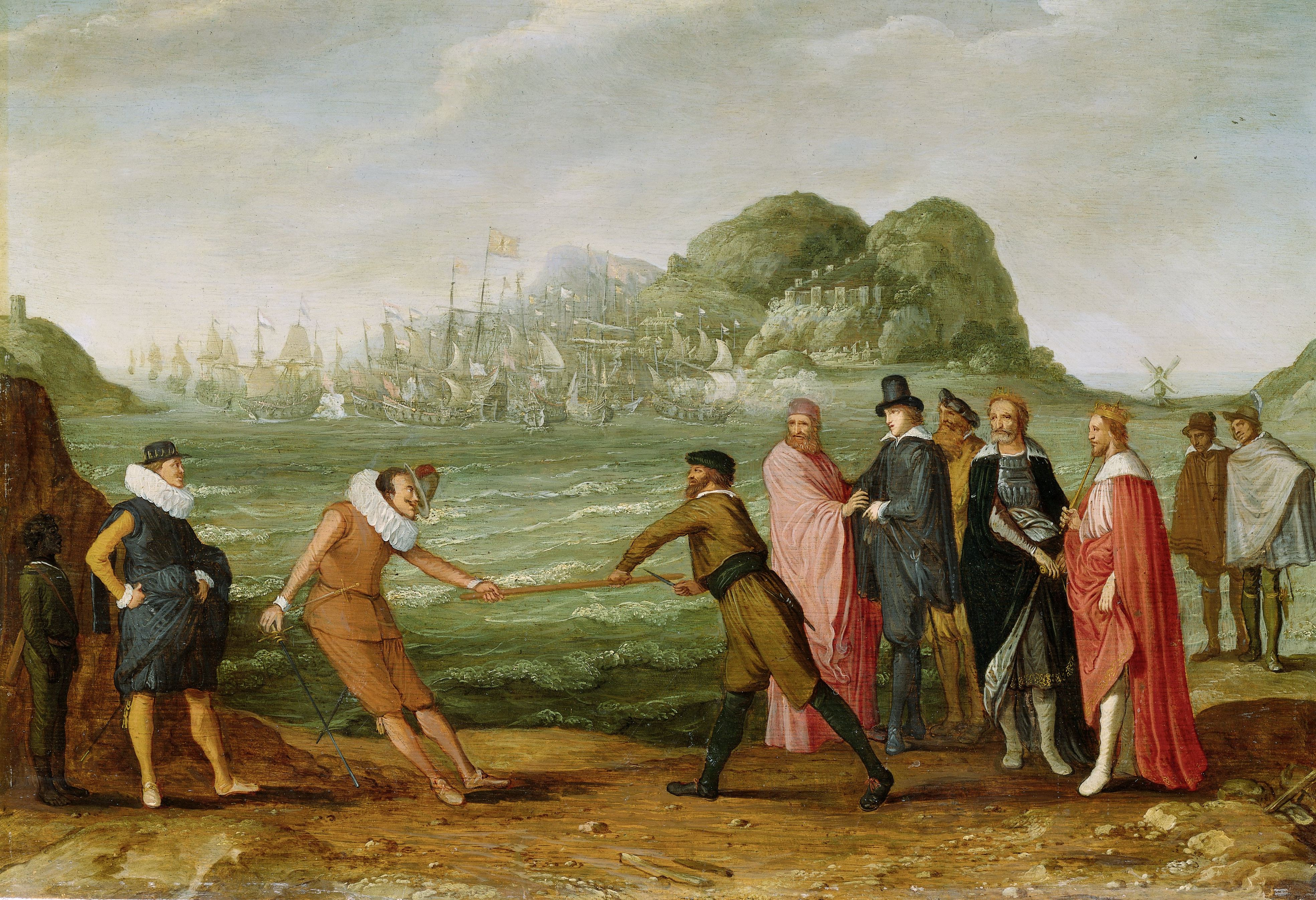
- Artist: Adam Willaerts
- Year: 1615
- Medium: oil painting
- Dimensions: 38.4 cm × 55.9 cm (15.1 in × 22.0 in)
- Location: Rijksmuseum; Amsterdam

Allegory of the Dutch Defeat of the Spanish Fleet in Gibraltar, 25 April 1607 (Dutch: Allegorie op de overwinning van de Hollandse op de Spaanse vloot bij Gibraltar) is an oil painting on panel of the Dutch painter Adam Willaerts.

== Description ==
The painting has dimensions of 38.4 x 55.9 centimeters. Painted between 1615 and 1630 in the city of Utrecht, the painting is in the collection of the Rijksmuseum of Amsterdam.

== Analysis ==
The painting is an allegory of the Dutch victory against the Spaniards during the battle of Gibraltar, that took place on 25 April 1607 in the context of the Eighty Years' War.

The painting shows in the foreground a Dutch and a Spanish struggling between them by a wooden bar, while an English and a Venetian observe them. In the background one can observe the naval battle in the vicinity of the Rock.

== See also ==
- Battle of Gibraltar (1607)
