= 122–126 Micklegate =

Listed terrace in York, England

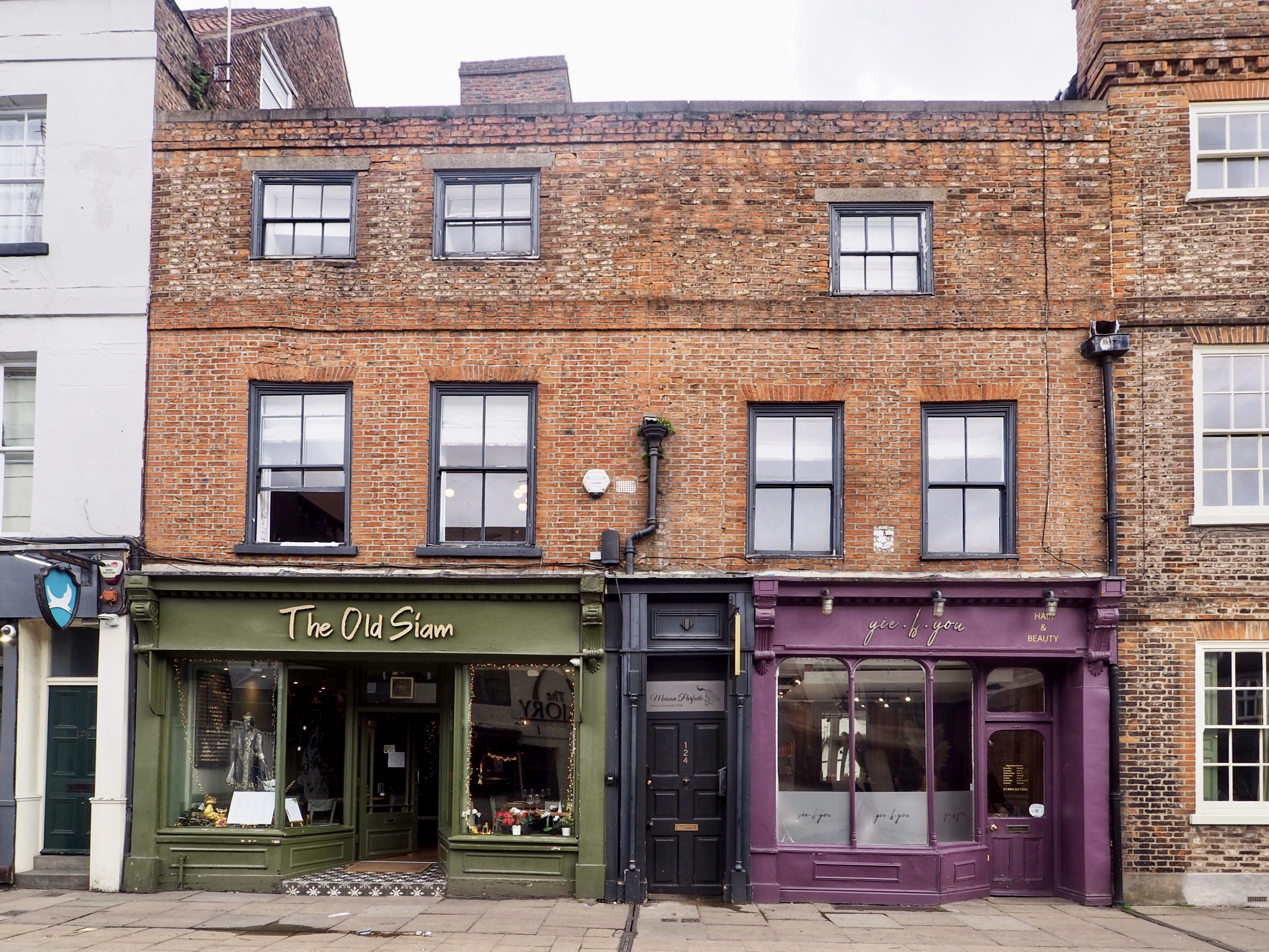
- The terrace in 2024; No. 122 is on the right
- Interactive map of the 122–126 Micklegate area

General information
- Status: Converted to mixed commercial and residential
- Type: Houses (former)
- Location: Micklegate, York, England
- Coordinates: 53.9565°N 1.0903°W
- Years built: Late 17th and early 18th century
- Renovated: Mid-19th century (remodelled); 20th century (probable, parapet rebuilt)

Listed Building – Grade II*
- Official name: 122, 124 and 126, Micklegate
- Designated: 1 July 1968
- Reference no.: 1257267

122–126 Micklegate is a Grade II* listed terrace on Micklegate in the city of York, England. Formed from two houses, the eastern part was built in the late 17th century and the western house was rebuilt and merged with it early in the 18th century. The property passed through several private residents in the 18th and 19th centuries and was redivided by 1876. It was remodelled in the mid‑19th century with contemporary shopfronts, and its parapet was probably rebuilt in the 20th century. The terrace was included in the Central Historic Core conservation area in 1968 and stands between Nos. 118–120, also listed at Grade II*, and Nos. 128–132, listed at Grade II. Today Nos. 122 and 126 contain restaurants at ground floor, while No. 124 is a four‑bedroom dwelling.

== History ==
Standing on Micklegate, the two shops occupy a building formed from what were originally two houses. The eastern house was built in the late 17th century and early in the 18th century the western house was rebuilt and the two were merged, probably at the time of the 1738 marriage of Robert Bower, a mercer, who lived here until his death in 1777. His widow remained until 1784, after which the property passed through several private residents before its sale in 1833. It was occupied from 1834 by John Hopps, a surgeon, then by William Drinkall, a grocer; by 1876 it had been redivided and was held by Edward Hill, a grocer, and Mr Cutforth, a shoemaker. Railings in front of the house were reported as 'maliciously broke and destroyed' in 1756. The building was remodelled in the mid‑19th century with contemporary shopfronts, and the parapet was probably rebuilt in the 20th century.

On 1 July 1968, the terrace was designated a Grade II* listed building, and the same year the site was included within the newly established Central Historic Core conservation area. The terrace stands between Nos. 118–120, which are also listed at Grade II*, and Nos. 128–132, listed at Grade II. Nos. 122 and 126 are now occupied by restaurants on the ground floor, while No. 124 is a four-bedroom dwelling.

== Architecture ==
The lower storeys are in painted brick, with the top floor built in mottled orange brick. A simple parapet with concrete coping runs along the front. The roofs are covered with pantiles and have brick chimneys.

The frontage has three storeys and four window bays. The ground floor is taken up by two shopfronts set beneath a continuous cornice with dentil detailing, carried on carved brackets above plain pilasters. At the centre is the upstairs entrance, a six‑panel door with an overlight.

No. 122 has a half‑canted shop window of three lights with shallow arched heads on slender columns above a panelled base. To the right is a partly glazed and partly panelled shop door with a segment‑headed overlight set back within a panelled reveal. The shopfronts to Nos. 124 and 126 have been altered, but painted cast‑iron columns from an earlier arrangement remain.

On the first floor the windows are four‑pane sashes with flat brick arches; those to Nos. 124 and 126 have painted stone sills. The second floor has two‑light casements, one at No. 122 and two shared between Nos. 124 and 126. A painted brick band marks the second‑floor level.

At the rear, No. 122 has a projecting wing of two storeys with an attic and a two‑window gable end. The first‑floor windows are four‑pane sashes with cambered heads. The attic opening has been altered to a glazed door but retains its original segmental arch.

=== Interior ===
On the ground floor, the shop at No. 122 retains late‑17th‑century panelling and a moulded cornice, while the shop at No. 124 preserves bolection panelling and a modillion cornice. The entrance hall has a plaster cornice, and a round arch on fluted pilasters leads into the stairhall, which has a geometric plaster ceiling.

The main staircase rises from the ground to the second floor and has an open string with turned and twisted balusters, three to each tread, and a moulded handrail that sweeps around a turned newel at the foot. The stairwell is lined with matching dado panelling. Parts of the earlier staircase survive between the second and third floors, including a closed string, bulbous balusters, square newels with moulded caps, and a moulded handrail.

On the first floor, the landing is lined with raised panelling. The front room of Nos. 124 and 126 has panelled doors and surrounds, built‑in cupboards, and a fireplace with pilaster sides and detailing, together with a dentilled cornice. The rear room of No. 122 is lined with bolection panelling beneath a moulded cornice, and fragments of its fireplace and overmantel remain. A 17th‑century roof structure is reported to survive above No. 122.

== See also ==
- Grade II* listed buildings in the City of York
- Listed buildings in York (within the city walls, southern part)
