= Jacob Gillig =

Dutch Golden Age painter

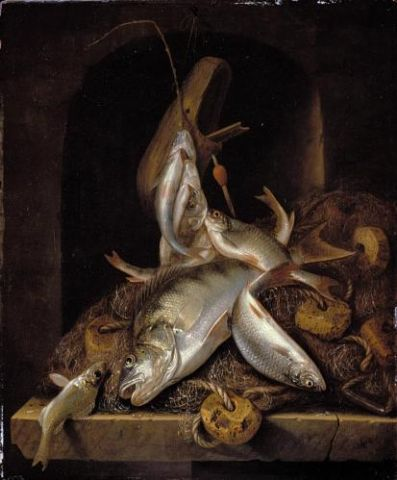
Freshwater Fish (1684)

Jacob Gillig (also spelled Jakob or Gellig; ca. 1636 – 24 July 1701) was a Dutch Golden Age painter of still lifes, usually of fish. Although he produced several portraits, it is for painting fish that he is best known.

Gillig was born and died in Utrecht. He apparently did not begin painting until his twenties, never registered as a master with the Utrecht Guild of Painters, and worked a merchant and then as a prison warden. In Utrecht the city prison was next to the fish market.

He married a daughter of Abraham Willaerts in 1661. According to Houbraken, he tried his hand at portrait painting, but his likenesses were not very like his subjects.

His works, as in the example to the right, favored pyramidal compositions. These were much respected in Utrecht at the time, and several of his works were copied by Abraham Mignon.
