= Abraham Willaerts =

Dutch painter

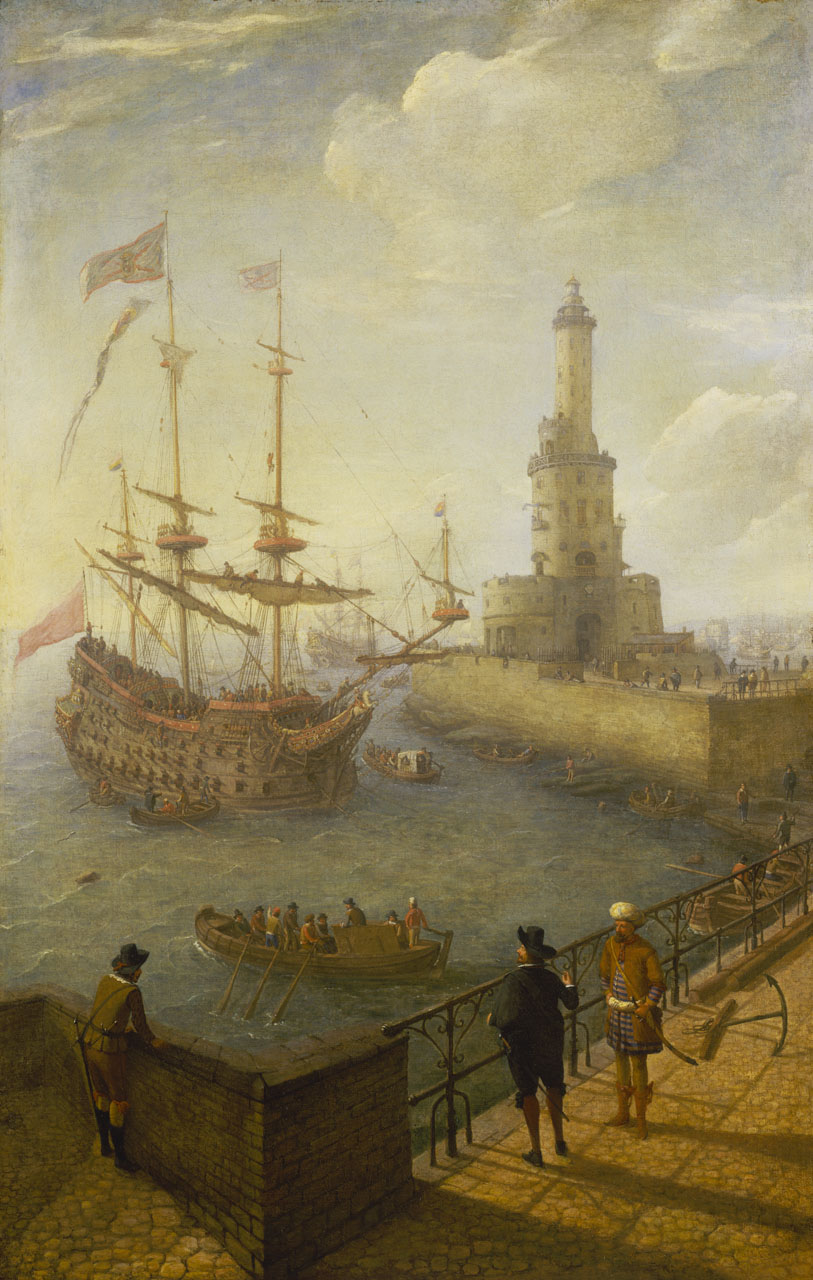
A Spanish three-Decker at anchor off Naples

Abraham Willaerts (c. 1603 - 18 October 1669) was a Dutch Baroque painter, mostly of marine and harbor scenes. He also painted a number of single and family portraits.

== Life ==
Abraham Willaerts was born in Utrecht, the son of the painter Adam Willaerts. He trained with his father, a marine painter. He later studied with the Utrecht Caravaggist Jan van Bijlert in Utrecht. He became a member of the Utrecht Guild of Saint Luke in 1624. He travelled to Paris in 1628 where he worked in the workshop of the prominent religious and history painter Simon Vouet. He returned to his home country in 1635.

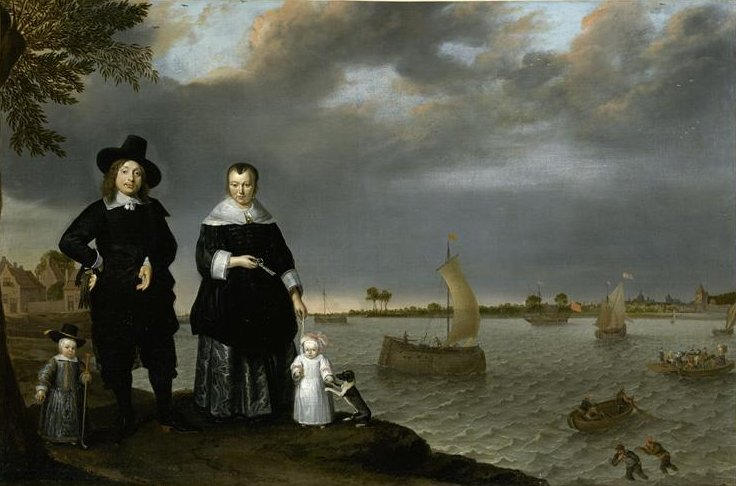
Portrait of a shipowner's family

On 1637 or 1638 Willaerts sailed to Brazil serving in the entourage of Count John Maurice of Nassau-Siegen, the governor of the Dutch possessions in Brazil. In 1641 the Count sent him with the Dutch fleet from Brazil to Angola (where the Dutch had just taken São Paulo de Loanda and the island of Tomé) on a mission to observe the customs and manners of the indigenous people. Among the paintings he produced were portraits of King Garcia II of Kongo, and Njinga Mbande, the famous queen of Ndongo and Matamba then allied with the Dutch against the Portuguese. Willaerts was also probably responsible for the content, if not the execution of the illustrations of Central Africa that appear in Olfert Dapper's geographical book Description of Africa (1668 book).

He had returned to the Netherlands in 1644, where he stayed with the prominent architect and painter Jacob van Campen at his castle Randenbroeck near Amersfoort.

In 1659–60 he visited Rome. Here he joined the Bentvueghels, an association of mainly Dutch and Flemish artists working in Rome. It was customary for the Bentvueghels to adopt an appealing nickname, the so-called 'bent name'. Abraham Willaerts was reportedly given the bent name 'Indian'. This nickname was likely given him because of his travels among the Brazilian tribes. He probably travelled further south to Naples, where he may have found inspiration for his imaginary views of Mediterranean ports.

He died in Utrecht. His brother Isaac was also a marine painter.

== Work ==
Although mainly a marine painter, Willaerts also painted portraits.

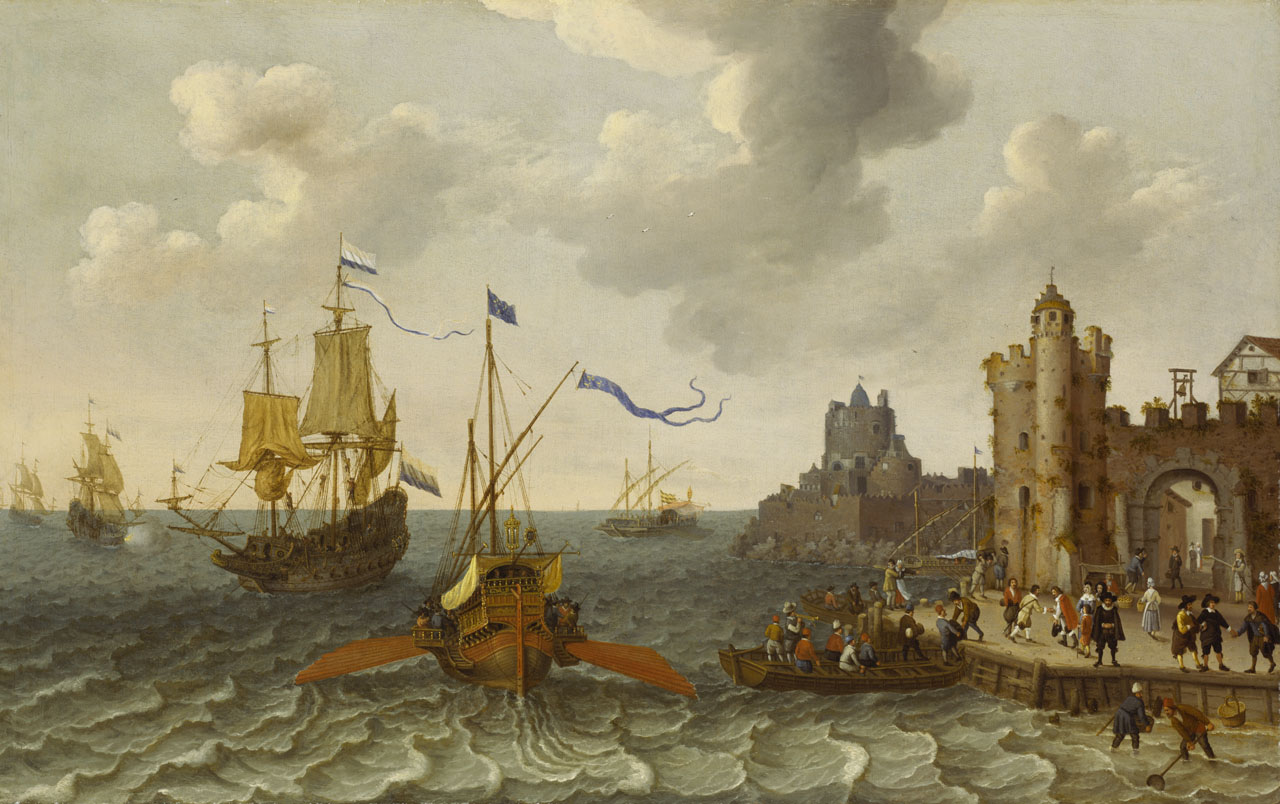
A French galley and Dutch men-of-war off a port

His marine paintings closely follow those of his father as is seen in his Ships near a rocky shore (1647, Frans Hals Museum, Haarlem). He preferred compositions with an atmospheric softness. In addition to Dutch harbour and coastal scenes, he also painted Mediterranean harbour views (real and imaginary), such as the Harbour of Naples (National Maritime Museum, London). Despite Willaerts' six-year stay in Brazil and in Angola his compositions never treated specifically Brazilian or African subjects.

Willaerts painted a series of portraits, both of single figures (several were admirals) and family groups. He also added portraits in the foreground of some of his father's harbour scenes.

Willaerts also collaborated with the still life painter Willem Ormea on a Fish still life with stormy sea which combines a seascape with a still life of fish in the foreground.
