= Adam Willaerts =

Dutch Golden Age painter

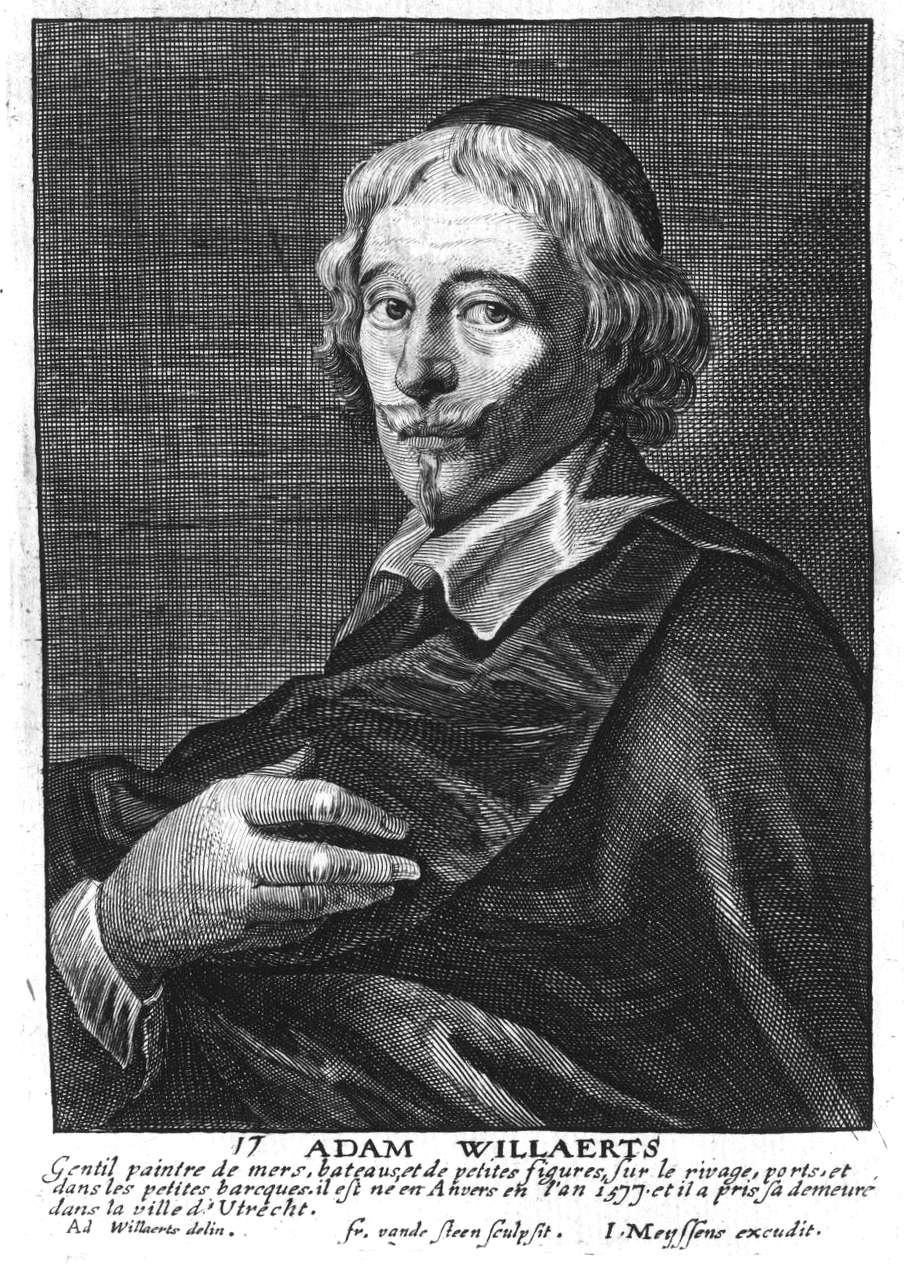
Adam Willaerts in Het Gulden Cabinet p 111

Adam Willaerts (21 July 1577 – 4 April 1664) was a Dutch Golden Age painter.

== Biography ==
Willaerts (occasionally Willarts, Willers) was born in London to Flemish parents who had fled from Antwerp for religious reasons. By 1585 the family lived in Leiden. From 1597 until his death, Adam lived and worked in Utrecht. He became a member of the Utrecht Guild of St. Luke in 1611 and subsequently became its dean in 1620. His sons Cornelis, Abraham, and Isaac followed in his footsteps.

He was known as a painter of river and canal pieces, coastal landscapes, fish-markets, processions, and genre scenes. He also painted villages and marine battle scenes.

His best known work is a contemporary depiction of the Pilgrims leaving Delftshaven aboard the Speedwell.

His Allegory of the victory of the Dutch on the Spanish fleet in Gibraltar is in the Rijksmuseum.

== Gallery ==
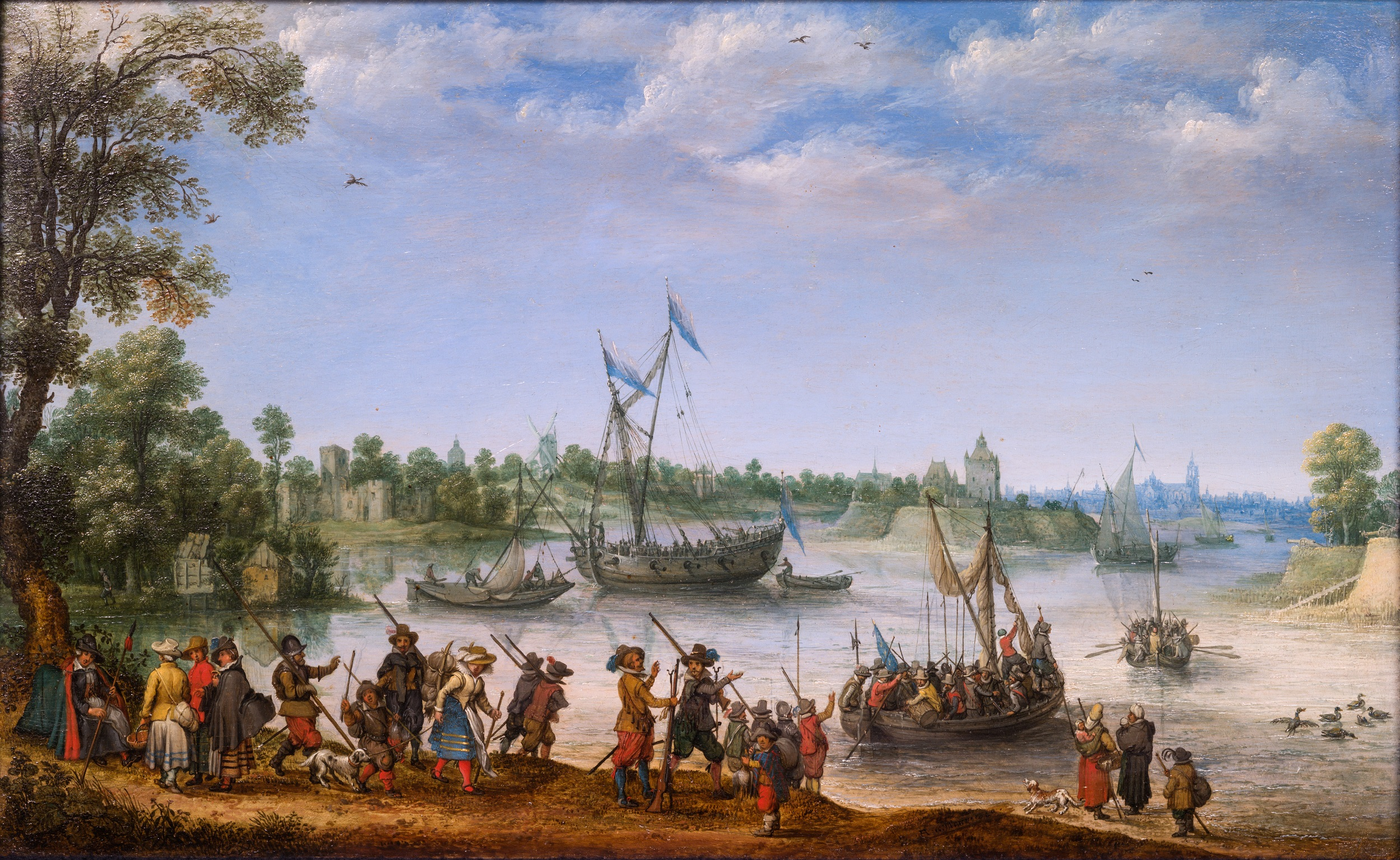
The Pilgrims leaving Delfshaven, 1620.

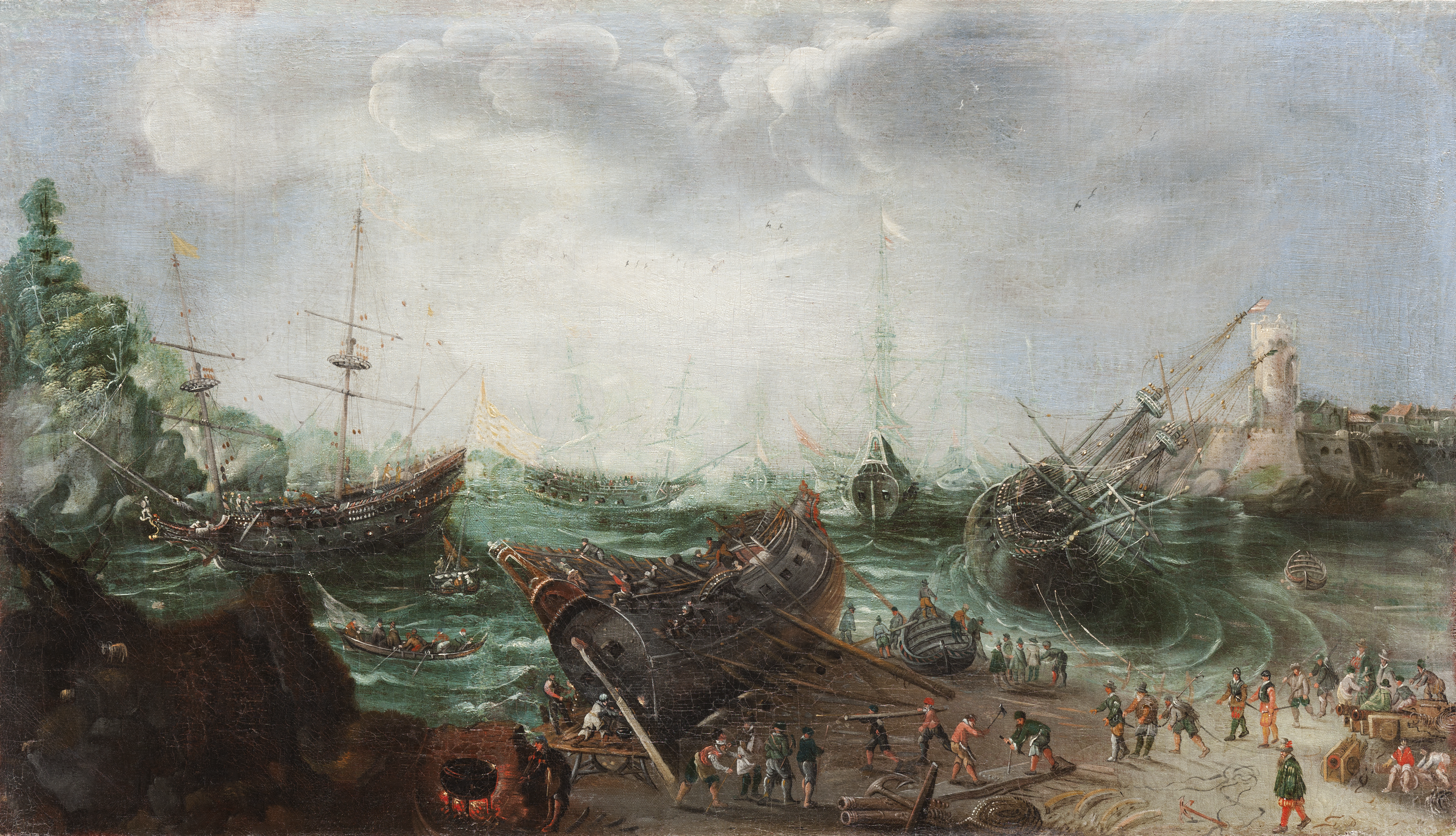
Harbour scene, circa 1615.

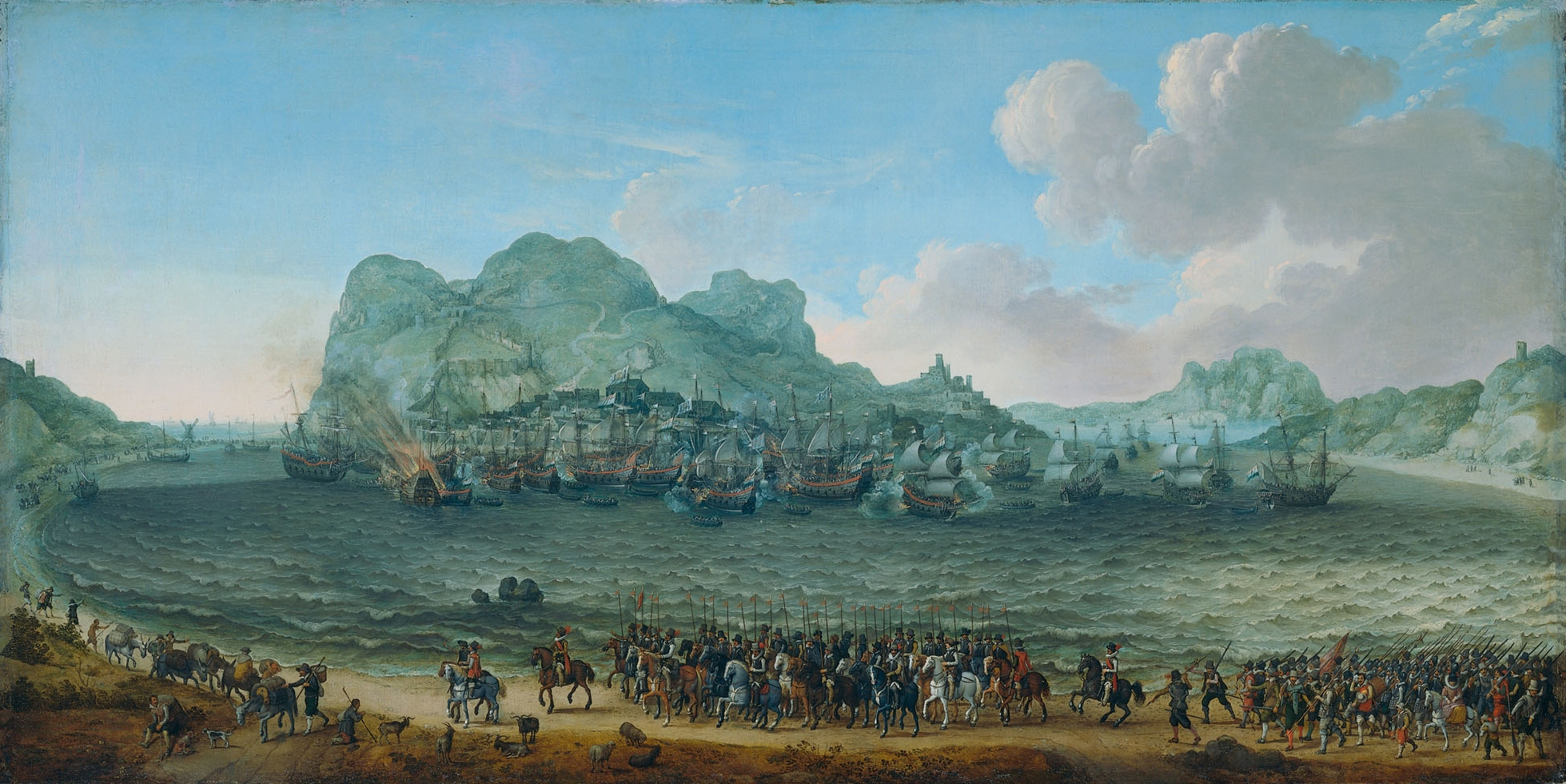
The defeat of the Spaniards at Gibraltar by a Dutch fleet under command of Admiral Jacob van Heemskerck, 1617.

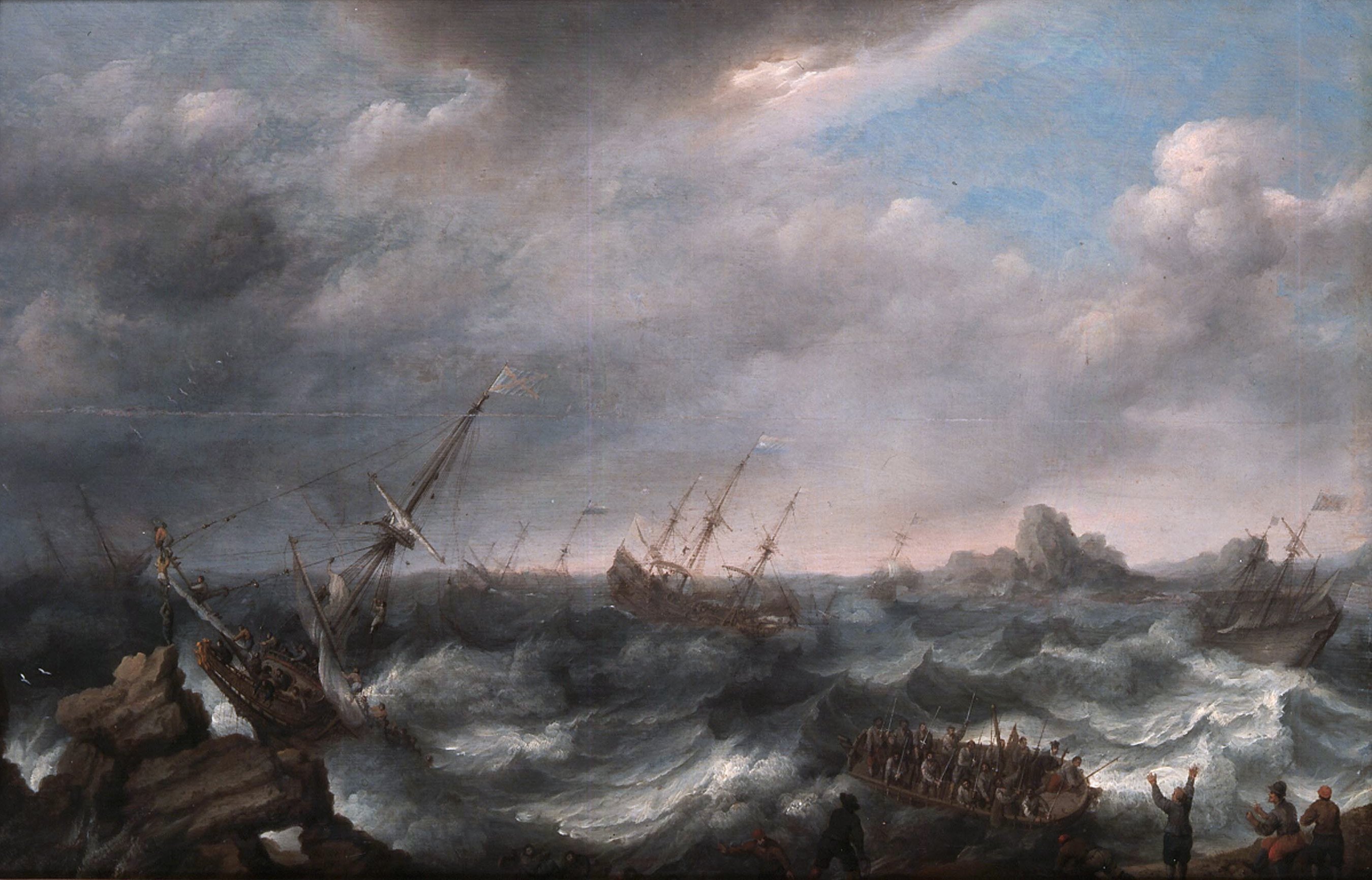
Shipwrecked on a stormy sea, 1636
